= Zara Larsson discography =

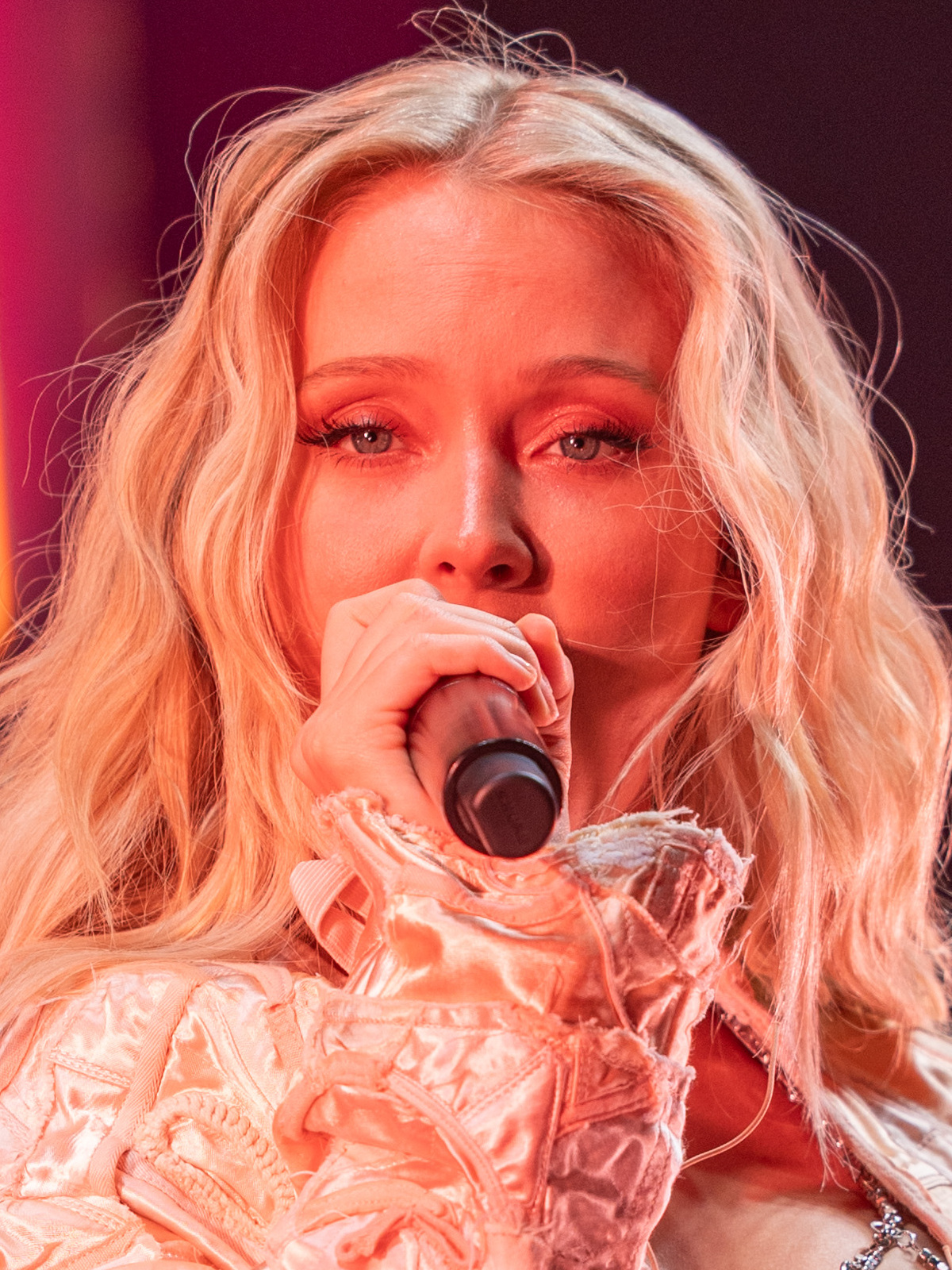
- Larsson performing on the Homecoming Festival in 2024
- Studio albums: 5
- EPs: 6
- Singles: 38
- Music videos: 36
- Promotional singles: 7

The Swedish singer Zara Larsson has released five studio albums, six extended plays (EPs), 37 singles (including seven as a featured artist), seven promotional singles, and 36 music videos. Five of Larsson's singles, "Uncover", "Lush Life", "Never Forget You", "Ain't My Fault", and "Symphony" have topped the charts in Sweden. "Uncover" and "Lush Life" peaked in the top five in Norway, Sweden, the Netherlands, Belgium and Denmark, and in the top ten in France.

Her debut studio album, 1 (2014), topped the Swedish Albums Chart and was certified platinum in her home country, while reaching number 28 in Norway, and number 33 in Denmark. Her second studio album, So Good, was released on 17 March 2017. It topped the Swedish Albums Chart and reached the top 10 in several countries, including Australia, New Zealand, Norway, Denmark and the United Kingdom. Her third studio album, Poster Girl, was released internationally on 5 March 2021. It was her second album to be released internationally and peaked at number three in her native Sweden. The album was preceded by four singles, including the 2018 hit "Ruin My Life". "Don't Worry Bout Me" and "All the Time" were also released prior to the album, but were not included on the standard edition and only included on the Japanese edition.

On 1 December 2023, Larsson released her sixth (and first Christmas) extended play (EP), Honor the Light, which topped the Swedish Albums Chart and became her third release to reach number one in her home country. The EP was preceded by the release of two singles: "Memory Lane" and "Winter Song", which were both released a week prior to the EP's release. Her fourth studio album, Venus (2024), which features four singles with "Can't Tame Her", "End of Time", "On My Love" (with David Guetta), and "You Love Who You Love" supporting the album's release. Her fifth studio album, Midnight Sun (2025), reached number one in Sweden, becoming her fourth album to reach the summit in her native country.

== Albums ==
=== Studio albums ===
List of studio albums, with selected details, chart positions, and certifications
Title	Studio album details	Peak chart positions										Certifications
Title	Studio album details	SWE	AUS	BEL (FL)	NLD	NOR	SCO	SPA	SWI	UK	US	Certifications
1	Released: 1 October 2014; Label: Ten, Universal, Epic; Formats: CD, digital download, streaming	1	—	—	—	28	—	—	—	—	—	GLF: Platinum; IFPI DEN: Gold; IFPI NOR: Platinum
So Good	Released: 17 March 2017; Label: Ten, Epic; Formats: CD, digital download, streaming, vinyl	1	7	19	7	2	8	29	15	7	26	GLF: 2× Platinum; ARIA: Gold; BPI: Platinum; BVMI: Gold; IFPI DEN: 3× Platinum; IFPI NOR: 6× Platinum; MC: 2× Platinum; NVPI: Diamond; RIAA: Platinum; RMNZ: 4× Platinum
Poster Girl	Released: 5 March 2021; Label: Ten, Epic; Formats: CD, digital download, streaming, vinyl, cassette	3	59	117	64	11	13	59	67	12	170	GLF: Gold; IFPI NOR: 2× Platinum; MC: Platinum
Venus	Released: 9 February 2024; Label: Sommer House, Epic; Formats: CD, LP, digital download, streaming	3	—	42	73	4	8	76	31	15	—	GLF: Gold; IFPI NOR: Platinum
Midnight Sun	Released: 26 September 2025; Label: Sommer House, Epic; Formats: CD, LP, digital download, streaming	1	31	15	15	10	15	41	31	36	36	GLF: Platinum; IFPI NOR: Gold
"—" denotes a recording that did not chart or was not released in that territory.

=== Remix albums ===
List of remix albums with selected details and chart positions
Title	Remix album details	Peak chart positions			
Title	Remix album details	SWE	AUS	DEN	NOR
Midnight Sun: Girls Trip (Note: In most territories, including the United States and the United Kingdom, the chart data for Midnight Sun: Girls Trip was combined with that of Midnight Sun, causing it to chart under the latter title.)	Released: 1 May 2026; Labels: Sommer House, Epic; Formats: CD, LP, digital download, streaming	5	14	22	14

== Extended plays ==
List of extended plays with selected details and chart positions
Title	Extended play details	Peaks
Title	Extended play details	SWE
Introducing	Released: 21 January 2013; Label: Ten, Universal; Format: Digital download, streaming	—
Allow Me to Reintroduce Myself	Released: 5 July 2013; Label: Ten, Universal; Format: Digital download, streaming	—
Uncover	Released: 16 January 2015; Label: Ten, Epic; Format: Digital download, streaming	—
The Remixes	Released: 18 December 2015; Label: TEN, Epic; Format: Digital download, streaming	—
Spotify Singles	Released: 5 April 2017; Label: Ten, Epic; Format: Streaming	—
Honor the Light	Released: 1 December 2023; Label: Sommer House, Epic; Format: EP, digital download, streaming	1
Spotify Live Room	Released: 12 March 2026; Label: Sommer House, Epic; Format: Streaming	—
"—" denotes a recording that did not chart or was not released in that territory.

== Singles ==
=== As lead artist ===
List of singles as lead artist released, showing year released, selected chart positions, certifications, and originating album
Title	Year	Peak chart positions										Certifications	Album
Title	Year	SWE	AUS	DEN	GER	IRE	NLD	NOR	NZ	UK	US	Certifications	Album
"My Heart Will Go On" (Note: Credited as Zara.)	2008	7	—	—	—	—	—	—	—	—	—		Non-album single
"Uncover"	2013	1	—	3	—	—	—	1	—	—	—	GLF: 6× Platinum; BPI: Silver; IFPI DEN: 3× Platinum; IFPI NOR: 4× Platinum; MC: Gold; RIAA: Gold	Introducing (Note: Released in promotion of Introducing; a different version was later featured on 1.)
"She's Not Me"	2013	21	—	—	—	—	—	—	—	—	—	GLF: Gold; IFPI NOR: Gold	Allow Me to Reintroduce Myself
"Bad Boys"	2013	27	—	33	—	—	—	—	—	—	—	IFPI DEN: Gold	1
"Carry You Home"	2014	3	—	—	—	—	—	—	—	—	—	GLF: 2× Platinum	1
"Rooftop"	2014	6	—	—	—	—	—	—	—	—	—	GLF: Platinum; IFPI DEN: Gold	1
"Weak Heart"	2015	53	—	—	—	—	—	—	—	—	—		1
"Lush Life"	2015	1	4	2	1	2	3	1	8	3	35	GLF: 10× Platinum; ARIA: 5× Platinum; BPI: 6× Platinum; BVMI: Diamond; IFPI DEN: 5× Platinum; IFPI NOR: 9× Platinum; MC: 5× Platinum; NVPI: Diamond; RIAA: 3× Platinum; RMNZ: 8× Platinum	So Good
"Never Forget You" (with MNEK)	2015	1	3	5	20	15	8	2	6	5	13	GLF: 5× Platinum; ARIA: 5× Platinum; BPI: 3× Platinum; BVMI: Platinum; IFPI DEN: 2× Platinum; IFPI NOR: 4× Platinum; MC: 4× Platinum; RIAA: 5× Platinum; RMNZ: 4× Platinum	So Good
"Ain't My Fault"	2016	1	17	15	16	17	29	8	19	13	76	GLF: 3× Platinum; ARIA: 2× Platinum; BPI: Platinum; BVMI: Gold; IFPI DEN: Platinum; IFPI NOR: 2× Platinum; MC: 2× Platinum; RIAA: Platinum; RMNZ: 2× Platinum	So Good
"I Would Like"	2016	4	16	23	56	7	28	23	19	2	—	GLF: Platinum; ARIA: 2× Platinum; BPI: Platinum; IFPI DEN: Platinum; IFPI NOR: Platinum; MC: Platinum; RIAA: Gold; RMNZ: Platinum	So Good
"So Good" (featuring Ty Dolla Sign)	2017	7	59	30	99	91	— (Note: "So Good" did not enter the Dutch Single Top 100, but peaked at No. 2 on the Dutch Single Tip chart.)	27	— (Note: "So Good" did not enter the NZ Top 40 Singles Chart, but peaked at number two on the NZ Heatseeker Singles Chart.)	44	—	GLF: Gold; ARIA: Gold; BPI: Silver; IFPI NOR: Gold; MC: Gold; RMNZ: Gold	So Good
"Don't Let Me Be Yours"	2017	36	—	—	—	—	—	—	—	—	—		So Good
"Only You" (Note: "Only You" received two alternate language versions; a German version featuring Nena, and a French version featuring Olivier Dion.)	2017	5	—	—	—	—	—	39	—	—	—	IFPI NOR: Platinum	So Good
"Ruin My Life"	2018	2	32	21	62	5	60	14	28	9	76	GLF: 3× Platinum; ARIA: Platinum; BPI: Platinum; IFPI DEN: Platinum; IFPI NOR: 2× Platinum; MC: 2× Platinum; RIAA: Platinum; RMNZ: 2× Platinum	Poster Girl (Note: "Don't Worry Bout Me" and "All the Time" are only included on the Japanese edition of Poster Girl.)
"Don't Worry Bout Me"	2019	7	—	—	—	36	—	26	— (Note: "Don't Worry Bout Me" did not enter the NZ Top 40 Singles Chart, but peaked at number 10 on the NZ Hot Singles Chart.)	34	—	GLF: Platinum; BPI: Silver; IFPI NOR: Gold	Poster Girl
"A Brand New Day" (with BTS)	2019	— (Note: "A Brand New Day" did not enter the Swedish Singellista Chart, but peaked at number nine on the Swedish Heatseeker Chart.)	—	—	—	—	—	—	— (Note: "A Brand New Day" did not enter the NZ Top 40 Singles Chart, but peaked at number 19 on the NZ Hot Singles Chart.)	—	—		BTS World: Original Soundtrack
"All the Time"	2019	19	—	—	—	57	— (Note: "All the Time" did not enter the Dutch Single Top 100, but peaked at number 24 on the Dutch Single Tip chart.)	—	— (Note: "All the Time" did not enter the NZ Top 40 Singles Chart, but peaked at number 14 on the NZ Hot Singles Chart.)	58	—	GLF: Platinum; BPI: Silver; IFPI DEN: Gold; IFPI NOR: Platinum; RIAA: Gold; RMNZ: Gold	Poster Girl
"Invisible"	2019	44	—	—	—	—	—	—	—	—	—		Klaus
"Like It Is" (with Kygo and Tyga)	2020	4	78	39	41	25	56	3	— (Note: "Like It Is" did not enter the NZ Top 40 Singles Chart, but peaked at number 4 on the NZ Hot Singles Chart.)	49	— (Note: "Like It Is" did not enter the Billboard Hot 100, but peaked at number 13 on the Bubbling Under Hot 100 chart.)	BPI: Silver; IFPI NOR: Platinum; MC: Platinum; RMNZ: Gold	Golden Hour
"Love Me Land"	2020	8	—	—	—	—	—	—	— (Note: "Love Me Land" did not enter the NZ Top 40 Singles Chart, but peaked at number 11 on the NZ Hot Singles Chart.)	— (Note: "Love Me Land" did not enter the Official Singles Chart, but peaked at number 45 on the Official Singles Download Chart, which counts only paid-for downloads in the UK.)	—	GLF: Platinum; IFPI NOR: Gold	Poster Girl
"Wow" (solo or remix featuring Sabrina Carpenter)	2020	27	—	—	—	95	—	—	— (Note: "Wow" did not enter the NZ Top 40 Singles Chart, but peaked at number 37 on the NZ Hot Singles Chart.)	— (Note: "Wow" did not enter the Official Singles Chart, but peaked at number 42 on the Official Singles Download Chart, which counts only paid-for downloads in the UK.)	—	BPI: Silver; IFPI NOR: Gold; MC: Gold; RIAA: Gold; RMNZ: Gold	Poster Girl
"Talk About Love" (featuring Young Thug)	2021	21	—	—	—	—	—	—	— (Note: "Talk About Love" did not enter the NZ Top 40 Singles Chart, but peaked at number 18 on the NZ Hot Singles Chart.)	—	—		Poster Girl
"Look What You've Done"	2021	24	—	—	—	—	—	—	— (Note: "Look What You've Done" did not enter the NZ Top 40 Singles Chart, but peaked at number 25 on the NZ Hot Singles Chart.)	—	—	GLF: Platinum; IFPI NOR: Gold	Poster Girl
"Can't Tame Her"	2023	5	—	33	—	36	— (Note: "Can't Tame Her" did not enter the Dutch Single Top 100, but peaked at number 17 on the Dutch Single Tip chart.)	7	—	25	—	GLF: Platinum; BPI: Platinum; IFPI DEN: Platinum; IFPI NOR: 2× Platinum	Venus
"End of Time"	2023	52	—	—	—	—	—	—	—	— (Note: "End of Time" did not enter the Official Singles Chart, but peaked at number 23 on the Official Singles Download Chart, which counts only paid-for downloads in the UK.)	—		Venus
"On My Love" (with David Guetta)	2023	3	—	—	80	15	75	9	— (Note: "On My Love" did not enter the NZ Top 40 Singles Chart, but peaked at number 12 on the NZ Hot Singles Chart.)	15	—	GLF: Gold; BPI: Platinum; IFPI DEN: Gold; IFPI NOR: Platinum	Venus
"Memory Lane"	2023	15	—	—	—	—	—	—	— (Note: "Memory Lane" did not enter the NZ Top 40 Singles Chart, but peaked at number 35 on the NZ Hot Singles Chart.)	—	—		Honor the Light
"Winter Song"	2023	69	—	—	—	—	—	—	—	—	—		Honor the Light
"Silent Night"	2023	39	—	—	—	—	—	—	—	—	—		Honor the Light
"You Love Who You Love"	2024	8	—	—	—	—	—	28	— (Note: "You Love Who You Love" did not enter the NZ Top 40 Singles Chart, but peaked at number 22 on the NZ Hot Singles Chart.)	— (Note: "You Love Who You Love" did not enter the Official Singles Chart, but peaked at number 15 on the Official Singles Download Chart, which counts only paid-for downloads in the UK.)	—		Venus
"Pretty Ugly"	2025	14	—	—	—	—	—	61	—	—	—		Midnight Sun
"Midnight Sun"	2025	4	16	—	72	12	19	28	11	7	12	BPI: Platinum; IFPI DEN: Gold; IFPI NOR: Platinum; MC: 2× Platinum; RIAA: Platinum; RMNZ: Platinum	Midnight Sun
"Crush"	2025	32	—	—	—	—	—	56	— (Note: "Crush" did not enter the NZ Top 40 Singles Chart, but peaked at number 34 on the NZ Hot Singles Chart.)	—	—		Midnight Sun
"Stateside" (with PinkPantheress)	2026	3	3	20	—	3	—	7	— (Note: "Stateside" did not enter the NZ Top 40 Singles Chart, but peaked at number 12 on the NZ Hot Singles Chart.)	—	6	ARIA: 2× Platinum; IFPI DEN: Gold	Fancy Some More?
"Talk to Me, Zara" (with Robyn)	2026	77	—	—	—	—	—	—	— (Note: "Talk to Me, Zara" did not enter the NZ Top 40 Singles Chart, but peaked at number 13 on the NZ Hot Singles Chart.)	—	—		Non-album single
"Blue Moon"	2026	16	90	—	—	—	— (Note: "Blue Moon" did not enter the Dutch Single Top 100, but peaked at number 24 on the Dutch Single Tip chart.)	76	39	—	—		Midnight Sun
"—" denotes releases that did not chart or were not released.

=== As featured artist ===
List of singles as a featured artist released, showing year released, selected chart positions, certifications, and originating album
Title	Year	Peak chart positions											Certifications	Album
Title	Year	SWE	AUS	DEN	GER	IRE	NLD	NOR	NZ	SWI	UK	US	Certifications	Album
"Girls Like" (Tinie Tempah featuring Zara Larsson)	2016	21	15	25	83	12	9	30	17	—	5	—	ARIA: Platinum; BPI: 3× Platinum; BVMI: Gold; IFPI DEN: 2× Platinum; IFPI NOR: 2× Platinum; RMNZ: 2× Platinum	Youth
"This One's for You" (Note: "This One's for You" is included on Zara Larsson's Japanese Edition of her second studio album So Good.) (David Guetta featuring Zara Larsson)	2016	3	67	11	1	10	6	4	—	1	16	—	BPI: Gold; BVMI: Gold; IFPI DEN: Platinum; IFPI NOR: 2× Platinum; IFPI SWI: Gold; RIAA: Gold; RMNZ: Gold	Non-album single
"Symphony" (Clean Bandit featuring Zara Larsson)	2017	1	4	10	9	2	4	1	12	6	1	— (Note: "Symphony" did not enter the Billboard Hot 100, but peaked at number 1 on the Bubbling Under Hot 100 chart.)	ARIA: 5× Platinum; BPI: 5× Platinum; BVMI: 3× Gold; IFPI DEN: 3× Platinum; IFPI NOR: 4× Platinum; IFPI SWI: 2× Platinum; MC: 4× Platinum; RIAA: Platinum; RMNZ: 5× Platinum	So Good and What Is Love?
"Holding Out for You" (Fedez featuring Zara Larsson)	2019	—	—	—	—	—	—	—	—	—	—	—		Paranoia Airlines
"Now You're Gone" (Tom Walker featuring Zara Larsson)	2019	84	—	—	—	77	—	—	— (Note: "Now You're Gone" did not enter the NZ Top 40 Singles Chart or Hot Singles Chart, but peaked at number twenty-four on the NZ Heatseeker Singles Chart.)	—	79	—	BPI: Silver	What a Time to Be Alive
"Times Like These" (as part of Live Lounge Allstars)	2020	—	—	—	—	—	— (Note: "Times Like These" did not enter the Single Top 100, but peaked at number 15 on the Dutch Top 40 Tipparade.)	—	— (Note: "Times Like These" did not enter the NZ Top 40 Singles Chart, but peaked at number 5 on the NZ Hot Singles Chart.)	—	1	—	BPI: Silver	Non-album singles
"Words" (Alesso featuring Zara Larsson)	2022	5	―	—	—	24	6	15	― (Note: "Words" did not enter the NZ Top 40 Singles Chart, but peaked at number 16 on the NZ Hot Singles Chart.)	―	36	―	BPI: Platinum; IFPI DEN: Platinum; RIAA: Gold; RMNZ: Platinum	Non-album singles
"She Did It Again" (Tyla featuring Zara Larsson)	2026	2	87	—	47	61	62	32	— (Note: "She Did It Again" did not enter the NZ Top 40 Singles Chart, but peaked at number 3 on the NZ Hot Singles Chart.)	34	40	59		A*Pop
"—" denotes a recording that did not chart or was not released in that territory.

=== Promotional singles ===
List of promotional singles released, showing year released, selected chart positions, certifications, and originating album
Title	Year	Peak chart positions			Certifications	Album
Title	Year	SWE	NZ Hot	US Dance Air.	Certifications	Album
"Säg Mig Var Du Står" (Carola featuring Zara Larsson)	2020	2	—	—	GLF: 3× Platinum	Poster Girl (Summer Edition)
"Nobody Is an Island"	2021	—	—	—		Non-album single
"Right Here" (solo or remix with Alok)	2021	—	—	6		Poster Girl (Summer Edition)
"I Need Love" (solo or remix featuring Trevor Daniel)	2021	36	—	—		Poster Girl (Summer Edition)
"Morning" (Billen Ted remix)	2021	—	—	—		Poster Girl (Summer Edition)
"Lay All Your Love on Me" (Spotify Singles)	2022	16	—	—	GLF: Platinum	Non-album single
"Ammunition" (solo or remix with Dennis)	2024	35	—	—		Venus
"Hot & Sexy"	2026	25	32	—		Midnight Sun
"Puppy Dance Party" (with Sesame Street)	2026	—	—	—		Non-album single
"Fast Emotion"	2026	—	—	—		Grand Theft Auto VI: The Album
"—" denotes a recording that did not chart or was not released in that territory.

== Other charted songs ==
List of other charted songs, showing year released, selected chart positions, certifications, and originating album
Title	Year	Peak chart positions										Certifications	Album
Title	Year	SWE	CZE Air.	IRE	NIC Ang. Air.	NGR	NOR	NZ Hot	UK	US Bub.	US Dance/ Pop	Certifications	Album
"Under My Shades"	2013	45	—	—	*		—	—	—	—	—		Introducing
"When Worlds Collide"	2013	26	—	—	*		—	—	—	—	—		Introducing
"It's a Wrap"	2013	43	—	—	*		—	—	—	—	—		Introducing
"What They Say"	2017	31	—	—	*		—	—	—	—	—		So Good
"TG4M"	2017	19	—	—	*		—	— (Note: "TG4M" did not enter the NZ Top 40 Singles Chart or the NZ Hot Singles Chart, but peaked at number six on the NZ Heatseeker Singles Chart.)	—	—	—	GLF: Platinum; IFPI NOR: Gold	So Good
"Sundown" (featuring Wizkid)	2017	51	—	—	*		—	—	—	—	—		So Good
"Make That Money Girl"	2017	57	—	—	*		—	—	—	—	—		So Good
"One Mississippi"	2017	26	—	—	*		—	—	—	—	—		So Good
"Funeral"	2017	46	—	—	*		—	—	—	—	—		So Good
"I Can't Fall in Love Without You"	2017	29	—	—	*		—	—	—	—	—	GLF: 2× Platinum; BPI: Silver; IFPI DEN: Platinum; IFPI NOR: 2× Platinum; MC: Gold; RIAA: Gold; RMNZ: Gold	So Good
"Mary, Did You Know?"	2017	55	—	—	*		—	—	—	—	—		The Star
"Need Someone"	2021	46	—	—	—	—	37	—	—	—	—		Poster Girl
"Poster Girl"	2021	— (Note: "Poster Girl" did not enter the Swedish Singellista Chart, but peaked at number six on the Swedish Heatseeker Chart.)	—	—	—	—	—	—	—	—	—		Poster Girl
"Morning"	2021	85	—	—	—	—	37	—	—	—	—		Poster Girl
"Tänd ett ljus"	2023	56	—	—	—	—	—	—	—	—	—		Honor the Light
"Venus"	2024	— (Note: "Venus" did not enter the Swedish Singellista Chart, but peaked at number one on the Swedish Heatseeker Chart.)	—	—	—	—	—	—	—	—	—		Venus
"Girl's Girl"	2025	98	—	—	—	—	—	—	—	—	—		Midnight Sun
"Eurosummer"	2025	84	—	—	—	—	—	—	83	—	—		Midnight Sun
"Hot & Sexy"	2025	25	—	—	—	—	—	32	—	—	—		Midnight Sun
"The Ambition"	2025	— (Note: "The Ambition" did not enter the Swedish Singellista Chart, but peaked at number 4 on the Swedish Heatseeker Chart.)	—	—	—	—	—	—	—	—	—		Midnight Sun
"Midnight Sun" (with PinkPantheress)	2026	62	—	—	—	—	—	8	—	—	—		Midnight Sun: Girls Trip
"Blue Moon" (with Kehlani)	2026	— (Note: "Blue Moon" did not enter the Swedish Singellista Chart, but peaked at number 1 on the Swedish Heatseeker Chart.)	—	—	—	—	—	22	—	—	—		Midnight Sun: Girls Trip
"Pretty Ugly" (with JT and Margo XS)	2026	— (Note: "Pretty Ugly" did not enter the Swedish Singellista Chart, but peaked at number 7 on the Swedish Heatseeker Chart.)	—	—	—	—	—	—	—	—	14		Midnight Sun: Girls Trip
"Girl's Girl" (with Emilia)	2026	— (Note: "Girl's Girl" did not enter the Swedish Singellista Chart, but peaked at number 4 on the Swedish Heatseeker Chart.)	—	—	—	—	—	—	—	—	—		Midnight Sun: Girls Trip
"Crush" (with Eli)	2026	— (Note: "Crush" did not enter the Swedish Singellista Chart, but peaked at number 9 on the Swedish Heatseeker Chart.)	—	—	—	—	—	—	—	—	—		Midnight Sun: Girls Trip
"Eurosummer" (with Shakira)	2026	17	—	90	2	77	93	16	—	14	11		Midnight Sun: Girls Trip
"Hot & Sexy" (with Tyla)	2026	89	—	—	—	—	—	—	—	—	—		Midnight Sun: Girls Trip
"The Ambition" (with Madison Beer and Bambii)	2026	— (Note: "The Ambition" did not enter the Swedish Singellista Chart, but peaked at number 11 on the Swedish Heatseeker Chart.)	—	—	—	—	—	32	—	—	—		Midnight Sun: Girls Trip
"Puss Puss" (with Robyn)	2026	26	—	—	—	—	—	—	—	—	—		Midnight Sun: Girls Trip
"—" denotes a recording that did not chart or was not released in that territory. "*" denotes that the chart did not exist at that time.

== Guest appearances ==
Title	Year	Other artist(s)	Album	Ref.
"Either"	2018	Poo Bear	Poo Bear Presents Bearthday Music	
"Fast Emotion"	2026	—N/a	Grand Theft Auto VI: The Album	

== Music videos ==
List of music videos, showing year released and directors
Title	Year	Director(s)	Ref.
As lead artist
"Uncover" (Introducing version)	2012	None	
"Under My Shades"	2013	Måns Nyman	
"She's Not Me (Pt. 1)"	2013	Måns Nyman	
"She's Not Me (Pt. 2)"	2013	Måns Nyman	
"Love Again"	2013	Zara Larsson	
"Bad Boys"	2013	Måns Nyman	
"Carry You Home"	2014	Emil Nava	
"Rooftop"	2014	Måns Nyman	
"Weak Heart"	2014	David Soutar	
"Uncover"	2015	A.V. Rockwell	
"Lush Life"	2015	Måns Nyman	
"Never Forget You" (with MNEK)	2015	Richard Paris Wilson	
"Lush Life" (Alternate version)	2016	Mary Clerté	
"Ain't My Fault"	2016	Emil Nava	
"So Good" (featuring Ty Dolla Sign)	2017	Sarah McColgan	
"Don't Let Me Be Yours"	2017	Daniel Kaufman	
"Ruin My Life"	2018	Charlotte Rutherford	
"Don't Worry Bout Me"	2019	Grant Spanier	
"All the Time"	2019	Alexandre Moors	
"Invisible"	2019	Sarah McColgan	
"Like It Is" (with Kygo and Tyga)	2020	Connor Brashier	
"Love Me Land"	2020	Viivi Huuska	
"Wow (Remix)" (featuring Sabrina Carpenter)	2020	Emil Nava	
"Wow"	2020	Emil Nava	
"Talk About Love" (featuring Young Thug)	2021	Ryder Ripps; Zara Larsson	
"Right Here" (Alok remix)	2021	Viivi Huuska	
"Can't Tame Her"	2023	Global	
"End of Time"	2023	The Baker Twins	
"On My Love" (with David Guetta)	2023	Mutant; Zara Larsson	
"You Love Who You Love"	2024	Viivi Huuska; Zara Larsson	
"Pretty Ugly"	2025	Charlotte Rutherford	
"Midnight Sun"	2025	Charlotte Rutherford	
"Stateside"	2026	Charlotte Rutherford	
As featured artist
"This One's for You" (David Guetta featuring Zara Larsson)	2016	Hannah Lux Davis	
"Girls Like" (Tinie Tempah featuring Zara Larsson)	2016	Craig Moore	
"Symphony" (Clean Bandit featuring Zara Larsson)	2017	Grace Chatto; Jack Patterson	
"Holding Out for You" (Fedez featuring Zara Larsson)	2019	Mauro Russo	
"Now You're Gone" (Tom Walker featuring Zara Larsson)	2019	Tim Mattia	
"Words" (Alesso featuring Zara Larsson)	2022	Jason Lester	
"She Did It Again" (Tyla featuring Zara Larsson)	2026	Aerin Moreno	
Guest appearances
"If the World Was Ending" (In Support of Doctors Without Borders) (JP Saxe, Julia Michaels and Friends)	2020	None	
