= List of awards and nominations received by Zara Larsson =

Zara Larsson awards and nominations
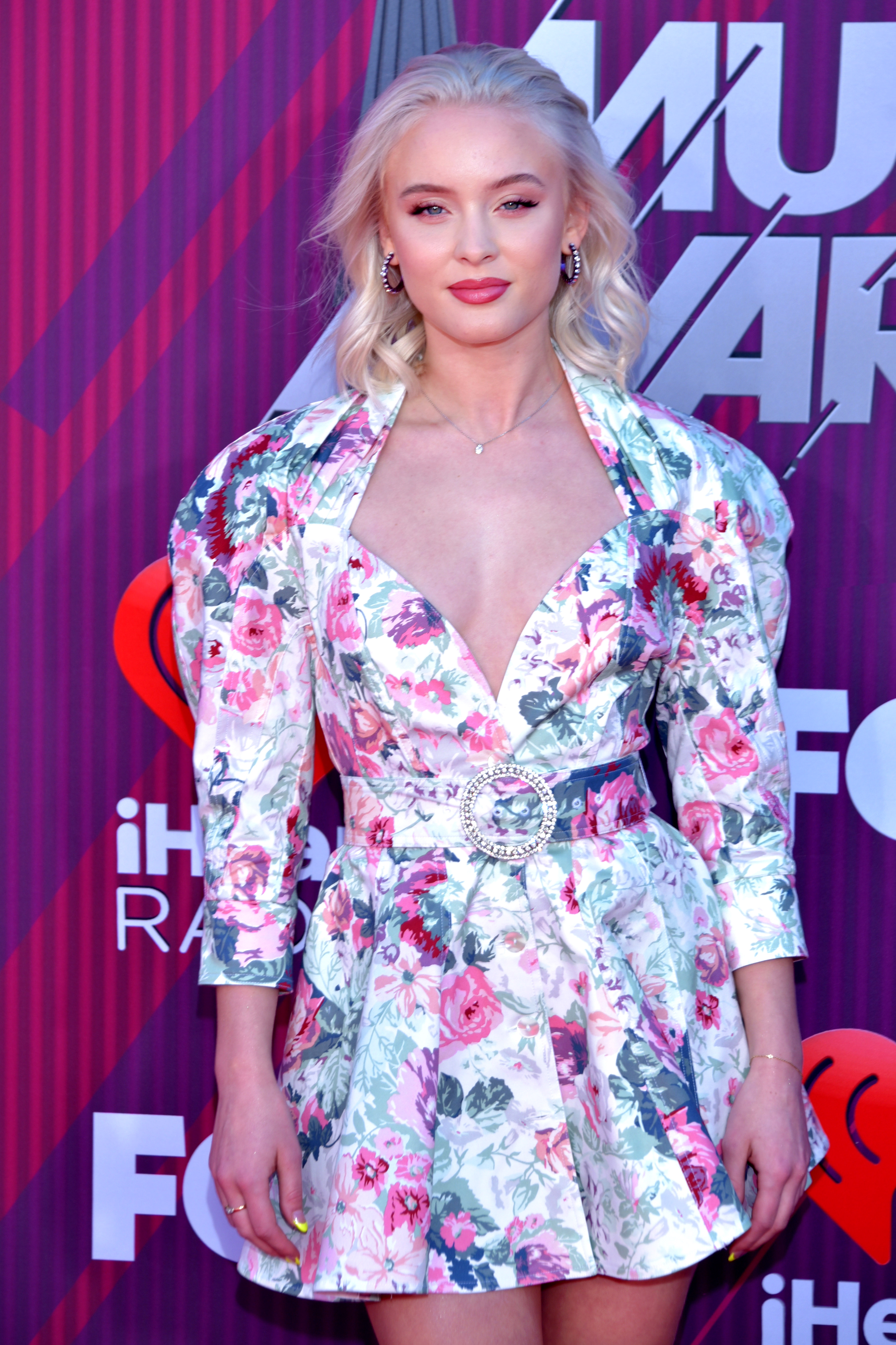
- Larsson at the 2019 iHeartRadio Music Awards
Awards and nominations
Award	Wins	Nominations
American Music Awards	2	5
Brit Awards	0	4
Grammy Awards	0	2
iHeartRadio Music Awards	0	5
MTV Europe Music Awards	5	11
MTV Video Music Awards	1	7

Totals (Note: Certain award groups do not simply award one winner. They acknowledge several different recipients, have runners-up, and have third place. Since this is a specific recognition and is different from losing an award, runner-up mentions are considered wins in this award tally. For simplification and to avoid errors, each award in this list has been presumed to have had a prior nomination.)
- Wins: 66
- Nominations: 207

Swedish singer Zara Larsson is the recipient of numerous awards, including two American Music Awards, five MTV European Music Awards, and nine Rockbjörnen. Additionally, Larsson has received six Grammis out of thirteen nominations, which are considered as the Swedish equivalent of the Grammy Awards, for which Larsson has also received two nominations.

== Awards and nominations ==
Award	Year (Note: Indicates the year of ceremony. Each year is linked to the article about the awards held that year, wherever possible.)	Recipient(s) and nominee(s)	Category	Result	Ref.
American Music Awards	2026	Herself	Breakthrough Pop Artist	Nominated	
American Music Awards	2026	Midnight Sun	Breakthrough Album of the Year	Won	
American Music Awards	2026	"Stateside" (with PinkPantheress)	Collaboration of the Year	Won	
American Music Awards	2026	"Stateside" (with PinkPantheress)	Song of the Summer	Nominated	
American Music Awards	2026	"Lush Life"	Social Song of the Year	Nominated	
ASCAP London Awards	2017	"Never Forget You" (with MNEK)	Top EDM Song	Won	
ASCAP London Awards	2017	"Never Forget You" (with MNEK)	Winning Song	Won	
ASCAP Pop Music Awards	2017	"Never Forget You" (with MNEK)	Winning Song	Won	
Bambi Award	2023	Herself	Music International	Won	
BBC Radio 1's Teen Awards	2017	Herself	Most Entertaining Celebrity	Nominated	
Big Apple Music Awards	2017	Herself	Best Swedish Act	Nominated	
Billboard Women in Music	2026	Herself	Breakthrough Artist	Won	
Blog Awards	2014	Herself	Best Blogger Artist	Won	
Blog Awards	2014	Herself	Best Celebrity	Won	
BMI London Awards	2017	"Lush Life"	Winning Song	Won	
Bravo Otto	2016	Herself	Super Female Singer	Bronze	
Brit Awards	2017	"Girls Like" (with Tinie Tempah)	Best British Single of the Year	Nominated	
Brit Awards	2017	"Girls Like" (with Tinie Tempah)	Best British Video	Nominated	
Brit Awards	2018	"Symphony" (with Clean Bandit)	Best British Single of the Year	Nominated	
Brit Awards	2018	"Symphony" (with Clean Bandit)	Best British Video	Nominated	
Capricho Awards	2016	Herself	Revelation of the Year	Nominated	
Capricho Awards	2017	Herself	International Revelation of the Year	Won	
DAF Bama Music Awards	2016	"Lush Life"	Best Song	Won	
DAF Bama Music Awards	2016	Herself	Best New Artist	Nominated	
DAF Bama Music Awards	2017	Herself	Best Swedish Female Act	Nominated	
DAF Bama Music Awards	2017	So Good	Best Album	Nominated	
DAF Bama Music Awards	2017	"Symphony" (with Clean Bandit)	Best Song	Nominated	
Electronic Dance Music Awards	2017	"Never Forget You" (Pyrodox remix) (with MNEK)	Best Trap Remix	Nominated	
Electronic Dance Music Awards	2018	"Ain't My Fault" (R3hab remix)	Best Trap Remix	Nominated	
Electronic Dance Music Awards	2023	Herself	Vocalist Of The Year	Won	
Electronic Dance Music Awards	2023	"Words" (with Alesso)	Dance/Electro Pop Song of the Year	Nominated	
Electronic Dance Music Awards	2024	Herself	Vocalist Of The Year	Nominated	
Electronic Dance Music Awards	2024	"On My Love" (with David Guetta)	Music Video of the Year	Nominated	
Electronic Dance Music Awards	2025	Herself	Vocalist Of The Year	Nominated	
Electronic Dance Music Awards	2026	Herself	Vocalist Of The Year	Won	
Electronic Dance Music Awards	2026	Herself	Breakout Artist of the Year	Nominated	
Electronic Dance Music Awards	2026	"Midnight Sun"	Music Video of the Year	Nominated	
Electronic Dance Music Awards	2026	"Crush"	Pop-Dance Anthem of the Year	Nominated	
GAFFA Awards (Denmark)	2017	So Good	Best Foreign Album	Nominated	
GAFFA Awards (Denmark)	2017	Herself	Best Foreign Act	Nominated	
GAFFA Awards (Norway)	2017	So Good	Best Foreign Album	Nominated	
GAFFA Awards (Norway)	2017	Herself	Best Foreign Act	Nominated	
GAFFA Awards (Sweden)	2014	Herself	Best Pop Act	Nominated	
GAFFA Awards (Sweden)	2014	Herself	Best Swedish Solo Act	Nominated	
GAFFA Awards (Sweden)	2014	Herself	Best Swedish Breakthrough	Nominated	
GAFFA Awards (Sweden)	2014	"Rooftop"	Best Swedish Song	Nominated	
GAFFA Awards (Sweden)	2015	"Lush Life"	Best Swedish Song	Won	
GAFFA Awards (Sweden)	2016	Herself	Best Swedish Solo Act	Won	
GAFFA Awards (Sweden)	2018	Herself	Best Swedish Solo Act	Won	
GAFFA Awards (Sweden)	2018	Herself	Best Swedish Live Act	Nominated	
GAFFA Awards (Sweden)	2018	So Good	Best Swedish Album	Won	
GAFFA Awards (Sweden)	2018	"Symphony" (with Clean Bandit)	Best Swedish Song	Won	
GAFFA Awards (Sweden)	2019	"Ruin My Life"	Best Swedish Song	Nominated	
GAFFA Awards (Sweden)	2020	Herself	Best Swedish Solo Act	Nominated	
GAFFA Awards (Sweden)	2020	"Don't Worry Bout Me"	Best Swedish Song	Nominated	
GAFFA Awards (Sweden)	2021	"Love Me Land"	Best Swedish Song	Nominated	
Gaygalan Awards	2014	"Uncover"	Best Swedish Song of the Year	Nominated	
Gaygalan Awards	2016	Herself	Hetero of the Year	Nominated	
Gaygalan Awards	2016	Herself	Artist of the Year	Nominated	
Gaygalan Awards	2017	"Ain't My Fault"	Best Swedish Song of the Year	Nominated	
Gaygalan Awards	2017	Herself	Hetero of the Year	Nominated	
Gaygalan Awards	2018	"Only You"	Best Swedish Song of the Year	Nominated	
Gaygalan Awards	2018	"Symphony" (with Clean Bandit)	Best International Song of the Year	Won	
Gaygalan Awards	2019	"Ruin My Life"	Song of the Year	Nominated	
Gaygalan Awards	2021	"Säg mig var du står" (with Carola)	Song of the Year	Nominated	
Gaygalan Awards	2022	"Look What You've Done"	Song of the Year	Nominated	
Gaygalan Awards	2023	"Words" (with Alesso)	Song of the Year	Nominated	
Global Awards	2019	Herself	Social Media Superstar	Nominated	
Global Awards	2024	Herself	Best Female	Nominated	
Global Awards	2024	Herself	Best Pop	Nominated	
Global Awards	2024	"Can't Tame Her"	Best Song	Nominated	
Grammis	2014	"Uncover"	Song of the Year	Nominated	
Grammis	2015	"Carry You Home"	Song of the Year	Nominated	
Grammis	2016	Herself	Artist of the Year	Nominated	
Grammis	2016	"Lush Life"	Song of the Year	Nominated	
Grammis	2017	Herself	Artist of the Year	Won	
Grammis	2017	"Ain't My Fault"	Song of the Year	Nominated	
Grammis	2018	Herself	Artist of the Year	Won	
Grammis	2018	So Good	Album of the Year	Won	
Grammis	2018	So Good	Pop Album of the Year	Nominated	
Grammis	2018	"Only You"	Song of the Year	Won	
Grammis	2019	"Ruin My Life"	Song of the Year	Nominated	
Grammis	2022	Poster Girl	Pop of the Year	Nominated	
Grammis	2024	Herself	Artist of the Year	Nominated	
Grammis	2024	"Can't Tame Her"	Song of the Year	Nominated	
Grammis	2024	Herself	Pop Artist of the Year	Nominated	
Grammis	2025	Herself	Artist of the Year	Nominated	
Grammis	2025	"You Love Who You Love"	Song of the Year	Nominated	
Grammis	2026	Herself	Artist of the Year	Won	
Grammis	2026	Midnight Sun	Pop of the Year	Won	
Grammy Awards	2026	"Midnight Sun"	Best Dance Pop Recording	Nominated	
Grammy Awards	2027	"Blue Moon"	Best Dance Pop Recording	Pending	
Guldtuben	2016	Herself	Artist of the Year	Nominated	
Hollywood Music in Media Awards	2019	"Invisible"	Best Original Song in an Animated Film	Nominated	
iHeartRadio Music Awards	2017	"Too Good"	Best Cover Song	Nominated	
iHeartRadio Music Awards	2026	"Midnight Sun"	Favorite TikTok Dance	Nominated	
iHeartRadio Music Awards	2026	Zara Larsson – Up Close	Favorite On Screen	Nominated	
iHeartRadio Music Awards	2026	Midnight Sun Tour	Favorite Tour Style	Nominated	
iHeartRadio Music Awards	2026	"Lush Life" star	Favorite Tour Tradition	Nominated	
Latin American Music Awards	2016	"Never Forget You" (with MNEK)	Favorite Dance Song	Nominated	
Latin Music Italian Awards	2016	Herself	Best International Female Artist	Nominated	
Los 40 Music Awards	2026	Herself	Best International Artist	Pending	
Los 40 Music Awards	2026	Midnight Sun Tour	Best International Tour	Pending	
MOBO Awards	2016	"Girls Like" (with Tinie Tempah)	Best Song	Nominated	
MTV Europe Music Awards	2015	Herself	Best Push Act	Nominated	
MTV Europe Music Awards	2015	Herself	Best Swedish Act	Nominated	
MTV Europe Music Awards	2016	Herself	Best New Act	Won	
MTV Europe Music Awards	2016	Herself	Best Swedish Act	Nominated	
MTV Europe Music Awards	2016	Herself	Best Worldwide Act	Won	
MTV Europe Music Awards	2017	Herself	Best Swedish Act	Won	
MTV Europe Music Awards	2019	Herself	Best Swedish Act	Nominated	
MTV Europe Music Awards	2020	Herself	Best Nordic Act	Won	
MTV Europe Music Awards	2021	Herself	Best Nordic Act	Nominated	
MTV Europe Music Awards	2023	Herself	Best Nordic Act	Nominated	
MTV Europe Music Awards	2024	Herself	Best Nordic Act	Won	
MTV Italian Music Awards	2017	Herself	Best Artist from the World	Nominated	
MTV Video Music Awards	2016	Herself	Best New Artist	Nominated	
MTV Video Music Awards	2025	"Pretty Ugly"	Best Choreography	Nominated	
MTV Video Music Awards	2026	"Stateside" (with PinkPantheress)	Song of the Year	Nominated	
MTV Video Music Awards	2026	"Stateside" (with PinkPantheress)	Best Collaboration	Nominated	
MTV Video Music Awards	2026	"Stateside" (with PinkPantheress)	Best Dance	Nominated	
MTV Video Music Awards	2026	"Stateside" (with PinkPantheress)	Best Art Direction	Won	
MTV Video Music Awards	2026	"Stateside" (with PinkPantheress)	Best Visual Effects	Nominated	
MTV Video Play Awards	2016	"Lush Life"	Winning Video	Won	
Musikexportpriset	2016	Herself	Special Mention	Won	
Musikexportpriset	2017	Herself	Special Mention	Nominated	
Musikförläggarnas Pris	2016	Herself	Breakthrough of the Year	Won	
Musikförläggarnas Pris	2016	"Lush Life"	Song of the Year	Won	
Musikförläggarnas Pris	2016	"Lush Life"	Most Streamed Song of the Year	Won	
Musikförläggarnas Pris	2017	"Ain't My Fault"	Song of the Year	Nominated	
Musikförläggarnas Pris	2024	International Success of the Year	Herself	Nominated	
Nickelodeon Kids' Choice Awards	2014	Herself	Best Swedish Star	Nominated	
Nickelodeon Kids' Choice Awards	2015	Herself	Favorite Swedish Star	Nominated	
Nickelodeon Kids' Choice Awards	2016	Herself	Favorite Swedish Star	Won	
Nickelodeon Kids' Choice Awards	2017	Herself	Favorite Swedish Star	Won	
Nickelodeon Kids' Choice Awards	2017	Herself	Favorite Global Music Star	Nominated	
Nickelodeon Kids' Choice Awards	2018	Herself	Favorite Swedish Star	Won	
Nickelodeon Kids' Choice Awards	2018	Herself	Favorite Global Music Star	Nominated	
Nickelodeon Kids' Choice Awards	2018	Herself	Favorite Norwegian Star	Nominated	
Nickelodeon Kids' Choice Awards	2018	Herself	Favorite Danish Star	Nominated	
Nickelodeon Kids' Choice Awards	2024	Herself	Favorite Global Music Star	Nominated	
NME Awards	2017	Herself	Best New Artist	Nominated	
NRJ Music Awards	2016	Herself	International Breakthrough of the Year	Nominated	
NRJ Music Awards	2016	"This One's For You" (with David Guetta)	International Song of the Year	Nominated	
P3 Gold Awards	2014	"Uncover"	Song of the Year	Nominated	
P3 Gold Awards	2015	Herself	Artist of the Year	Nominated	
P3 Gold Awards	2016	Herself	Artist of the Year	Nominated	
P3 Gold Awards	2016	"Lush Life"	Song of the Year	Won	
P3 Gold Awards	2017	Herself	Artist of the Year	Won	
P3 Gold Awards	2017	Herself	Gold Microphone	Nominated	
P3 Gold Awards	2017	"Ain't My Fault"	Song of the Year	Nominated	
P3 Gold Awards	2018	So Good	Album of the Year	Nominated	
P3 Gold Awards	2018	"Symphony" (with Clean Bandit)	Song of the Year	Nominated	
P3 Gold Awards	2018	Herself	Gold Microphone	Nominated	
P3 Gold Awards	2019	"Ruin My Life"	Song of the Year	Nominated	
P3 Gold Awards	2021	Herself	Artist of the Year	Nominated	
P3 Gold Awards	2023	Herself	Gold Microphone	Nominated	
P3 Gold Awards	2023	"Words"	Song of the Year	Nominated	
P3 Gold Awards	2024	Herself	Artist of the Year	Nominated	
P3 Gold Awards	2024	"Can't Tame Her"	Song of the Year	Nominated	
Radio Disney Music Awards	2017	"Never Forget You" (with MNEK)	Best Dance Track	Nominated	
Rockbjörnen	2013	Herself	Best Female Live Artist	Won	
Rockbjörnen	2013	Herself	Breakthrough of the Year	Won	
Rockbjörnen	2014	Herself	Best Female Live Artist	Won	
Rockbjörnen	2015	Herself	Best Female Live Artist	Won	
Rockbjörnen	2015	Herself	Special Award	Won	
Rockbjörnen	2015	Zara Larsson fans	Best Fans	Nominated	
Rockbjörnen	2016	Herself	Best Female Live Artist	Nominated	
Rockbjörnen	2016	Zara Larsson fans	Best Fans	Nominated	
Rockbjörnen	2017	Herself	Best Female Live Artist	Won	
Rockbjörnen	2017	"Only You"	Best Swedish Song	Won	
Rockbjörnen	2017	Zara Larsson fans	Best Fans	Nominated	
Rockbjörnen	2018	Herself	Best Female Live Artist	Won	
Rockbjörnen	2018	Zara Larsson fans	Best Fans	Nominated	
Rockbjörnen	2019	Herself	Best Female Live Artist	Nominated	
Rockbjörnen	2019	Zara Larsson fans	Best Fans	Nominated	
Rockbjörnen	2020	"Like It Is"	Best Foreign Song	Nominated	
Rockbjörnen	2021	Herself	Female Artist of the Year	Nominated	
Rockbjörnen	2023	Herself	Female Artist of the Year	Nominated	
Rockbjörnen	2024	Herself	Female Artist of the Year	Won	
Rockbjörnen	2025	Herself	Female Artist of the Year	Won	
Rockbjörnen	2026	Herself	Female Artist of the Year	Won	
Rockbjörnen	2026	Zara Larsson fans	Best Fans	Won	
Rockbjörnen	2026	"Stateside" (with PinkPantheress)	Best Foreign Song	Won	
Rockbjörnen	2026	"Puss Puss"	Best Swedish Song	Nominated	
Rollers Music Awards	2015	"Uncover"	Best Ballad of the Year	Nominated	
Scandipop Awards	2013	Herself	Scandipop's Brighttest New Hope	Won	
Scandipop Awards	2014	Herself	Best Female Artist	Nominated	
Scandipop Awards	2014	Herself	Best New Artist	Won	
Scandipop Awards	2014	"Uncover"	Best Single From a New Artist	Won	
Scandipop Awards	2014	Introducing	Best EP	Nominated	
Scandipop Awards	2015	Herself	Best Female Artist	Nominated	
Scandipop Awards	2015	1	Best Album	Nominated	
Scandipop Awards	2015	"Rooftop"	Best Song Pop	Nominated	
Scandipop Awards	2015	"Weak Heart"	Best Ballad	Nominated	
Scandipop Awards	2016	Herself	Best Female Artist	Won	
Scandipop Awards	2016	"Lush Life"	Best Song Pop	Nominated	
Scandipop Awards	2016	"Never Forget You" (with MNEK)	Best Video	Won	
Scandipop Awards	2017	Herself	Best Female Artist	Won	
Scandipop Awards	2017	"Ain't My Fault"	Best Song Pop	Won	
Scandipop Awards	2017	"This One's for You" (with David Guetta)	Best Dance Pop Song	Won	
Scandipop Awards	2017	Herself	Global Superstar	Won	
Scandipop Awards	2017	Herself	Social Heroe of the Year	Won	
Scandipop Awards	2018	Herself	Best Female Popstar	Won	
Scandipop Awards	2018	So Good	Best Album	Won	
Scandipop Awards	2018	"Symphony" (with Clean Bandit)	Best Dance Pop Song	Won	
Scandipop Awards	2019	"Ruin My Life"	Pop Song of the Year	Won	
Scandipop Awards	2020	"All the Time"	Best Pop Song	Won	
Scandipop Awards	2021	"Säg mig var du står" (with Carola)	Best Schlager Pop Song	Won	
Spotify Awards	2020	Herself	Most-Streamed EDM Female Artist	Nominated	
Streamy Awards	2017	Herself	Breakthrough Artist	Nominated	
Sync Awards	2016	"Lush Life"	Best Online / Viral Advert Song	Nominated	
Sync Awards	2016	Herself	International Breakout Project	Won	
Teen Choice Awards	2016	"Never Forget You" (with MNEK)	Choice Music: Break-Up Song	Nominated	
Teen Choice Awards	2016	Herself	Choice Music: International Artist	Nominated	
Teen Choice Awards	2017	Herself	Choice Breakout Artist	Nominated	
UK Music Video Awards	2026	"Stateside" (with PinkPantheress)	Best Pop Video – UK	Pending	
UK Music Video Awards	2026	"Stateside" (with PinkPantheress)	Best Styling in a Video	Pending	
WDM Radio Awards	2017	"This One's For You" (with David Guetta)	Best Global Track	Nominated	
