= It's Not Me, It's You (disambiguation) =

It's Not Me, It's You is a 2009 album by Lily Allen.

It's Not Me, It's You may also refer to:

- "It's Not Me, It's You" (song), 2011 song by Skillet
- It's Not Me, It's You (game show), British comedy panel game show
- It's Not Me, It's You!, book by Jon Richardson
- It's Not Me It's You, 2022 album by DDG
- "It's Not Me It's You", 2001 song by Prozzäk

== See also ==
- It's not you, it's me, a popular phrase
- Not Me (disambiguation)
