= She's Not Me (disambiguation) =

"She's Not Me" is a song by Swedish artist Zara Larsson.

She's Not Me may also refer to:

- "She's Not Me", a song on the Madonna album Hard Candy
- "She's Not Me", a song on the Jenny Lewis album The Voyager

== See also ==
- Not Me (disambiguation)
