= Why Not Me =

Why Not Me may refer to:

== Music ==
- Why Not Me (album), by The Judds, 1984
  - "Why Not Me" (The Judds song), the title song
- "Why Not Me" (Fred Knoblock song), 1980
- "Why Not Me?", a song by Enrique Iglesias from Euphoria, 2010
- "Why Not Me", a song by Eric Church, 2017
- "Why Not Me", a song by Forrest, a side project of Forrest Frank of the band Surfaces, 2018

== Other uses ==
- Why Not Me? (Kaling book), a 2015 book by Mindy Kaling
- Why Not Me? (film), a 1999 French comedy
- Why Not Me? (novel), a 1999 novel by Al Franken

== See also ==
- Not Me (disambiguation)
