= Uncover (EP) =

EP by Zara Larsson
- Released: 16 January 2015
- Length: 23:22
- Label: TEN; Epic
- Producer: Claude Kelly; Colin Norman; Robert Habolin; Tysper; Elof Loelv; Mack; Noev; Billboard; Nick Ruth

Zara Larsson chronology
1 (2014)	Uncover (2015)	So Good (2017)

Singles from Uncover
- 1. "Uncover" Released: 2 February 2015

Uncover is the third and debut international extended play by Swedish singer Zara Larsson. It was released on 16 January 2015 by TEN Music Group and Epic Records.

== Critical reception ==
The EP received positive reviews from critics upon its release. Kristen Maree of Renowned for Sound stated "Kicking off with laid-back, mid-tempo track 'Wanna Be Your Baby', Zara throws us back to some of Mariah Carey's peppier stuff, move quickly to 'Never Gonna Die' which you would be forgiven for mistaking for Rihanna. The title track 'Uncover' is the pretty ballad of the bunch, while 'Carry You Home' is exceptionally current and unique. The echoey 'She's Not Me' is the closest we get to cliché, saved by Zara's stunning vocal performance, while the closing 'Rooftop' is the nicest way to round off the EP, sounding like something from Taylor Swift's 1989".

MuuMuse's Bradley Stern claimed "[Uncover] is the very essence of Swede–pop at its finest – strong songcraft, powerful melodies, and captivatingly pure vocals, from the feel–good, '80's synth–soaked 'Wanna Be Your Baby' to the thoroughly brilliant 'Rooftop' to 'She's Not Me, Pt. 1 & 2', which glides across ghostly wisps like one long, paranoid internal monologue and/or ode to Madonna's Hard Candy jam".

== Track listing ==
Uncover track listing
No.	Title	Writer(s)	Producer(s)	Length
1.	"Wanna Be Your Baby" (Alternative version)	Claude Kelly; Colin Norman; Marcus "Mack" Sepehrmanesh	Kelly; Norman; Robert Habolin	3:04
2.	"Never Gonna Die" (Alternative version)	Ethan Lowery; Tommy Tysper	Tysper	3:40
3.	"Uncover"	Gavin Jones; Mack; Habolin	Habolin	3:33
4.	"Carry You Home"	Elof Loelv	Loelv	4:14
5.	"She's Not Me" (Pt. 1 and Pt. 2)	Mack; Joel Humlin	Mack; Naiv	5:32
6.	"Rooftop"	Mack; Mathieu Jomphe; Nick Ruth; Rickard Göransson	Billboard; Mack; Ruth	3:59
Total length:				23:22

== Release history ==
Uncover release history
Region	Date	Format	Label	Ref.
New Zealand	16 January 2015	Digital download; streaming	TEN; Epic; Sony	
Australia	16 January 2015	Digital download; streaming	TEN; Epic; Sony	
South Africa	16 January 2015	Digital download; streaming	TEN; Epic; Sony	
Canada	16 January 2015	Digital download; streaming	TEN; Epic; Sony	
United States	16 January 2015	Digital download; streaming	TEN; Epic; Sony	
