= That's Me (disambiguation) =

That's Me is a 1976 song by the Swedish pop group ABBA.

That's Me may also refer to:

== Films ==
- That's Me (film), 1963 short comedy film directed by Walker Stuart
- That's Me, 2001 Zimbabwean film

== Music ==
- That's Me (album), 1998 album by Agnetha Fältskog (from ABBA)
- That's Me (Paul Simon song), a song by Paul Simon from the 2006 album Surprise
- "That's Me", a song by Colton Ford from the 2008 album Tug of War
- "That's Me", 2017 song by Hedegaard
- "That's Me", a song by Martina McBride from the 1992 album The Time Has Come
- "That's Me", a song by Pink Lady from the 2008 album America! America! America!
- "That's Me", a song by Pentagon from the 2021 EP Love or Take

== See also ==
- That's Me, Too (Sådan er Jeg Osse), 1980 Danish drama film
- That's Not Me (disambiguation)
- The Blues; That's Me!, 1969 album by jazz saxophonist Illinois Jacquet
