= Not Me =

Not Me may refer to:

== Music ==
- Not Me (album), a 1988 album by Glenn Medeiros
- Not Me (song), a 2007 song by Amy Pearson
- "Not Me," a 1961 song by Gary U.S. Bonds
- "Not Me," a 1963 song by The Orlons
- "Not Me," a song by This Mortal Coil, from the album It'll End in Tears
- "Not Me," a song by Lil Wayne, from the album Funeral

== Other uses ==
- Not Me, an invisible gremlin who represents blame-shifting, in Bil and Jeff Keane's syndicated comic strip The Family Circus
- Not Me (TV series), 2021 Thai action drama

== See also ==
- It's Not Me, It's You (disambiguation)
- She's Not Me (disambiguation)
- That's Not Me (disambiguation)
- Why Not Me (disambiguation)
