= That's Not Me =

That's Not Me may refer to:

== Music ==
- "That's Not Me" (The Beach Boys song), a 1966 song by the Beach Boys
- "That's Not Me" (Skepta song), a 2014 song by Skepta and Jme
- "That's Not Me", a Huey Lewis and the News song from the album Hard at Play (1991)
- That's Not Me, 2004 album by American musician Randy Thompson

== Other uses ==
- Esa no soy yo (That's Not Me), a 2015–2016 Chilean drama television series
- That's Not Me (film), a 2017 Australian independent comedy film
- To Mee Navhech (That's Not Me), 1962 Marathi play by Acharya Atre

== See also ==
- Not Me (disambiguation)
- That's Me (disambiguation)
