= 1 (Zara Larsson album) =

Studio album by Zara Larsson
- Released: 1 October 2014
- Recorded: 2012–2014
- Genres: Pop; R&B
- Length: 47:00
- Labels: TEN; Universal; Epic
- Producers: O.C.; Kevin Figs; Colin Norman; Claude Kelly; Robert Habolin; Billboard; Nick Ruth; Marcus Sepehrmanesh; Tommy Tysper; A.C.; Elof Loelv; Mel & Mus; JUNGLE; Simon Hassle; Benjamin Johansson; Grizzly; Erik Arvinder; Naiv

Zara Larsson chronology
Allow Me to Reintroduce Myself (2013)	1 (2014)	Uncover (2015)

Singles from 1
- 1. "Bad Boys" Released: 13 October 2013; 2. "Carry You Home" Released: 12 May 2014; 3. "Rooftop" Released: 15 September 2014; 4. "Weak Heart" Released: 12 January 2015

1 is the debut studio album by Swedish singer Zara Larsson. It was released by TEN Music Group in Sweden on 1 October 2014, with a digital release available five days later for Denmark and Norway. The album is certified platinum in Sweden and gold in Denmark, for selling 40,000 and 10,000 units in the countries respectively.

On 30 January 2024, the album was given a full release worldwide on all digital services through Epic Records.

== Singles ==
"Bad Boys" was released as the lead single on 13 October 2013. It reached number 33 in Denmark and number 27 in Sweden. "Carry You Home" was released as the second single on 12 May 2014. It reached the top five in Sweden, peaking at number three. It additionally charted in Czech Republic and Denmark.

"Rooftop" was released as the third single on 15 September 2014. It reached number six in Sweden. "Weak Heart" was released as the fourth and final single on 12 January 2015. It reached number 53 in Sweden, making it the lowest-charting single from the album.

== Critical reception ==
Kyle Copier of A Music Blog, Yea? gave 1 a positive review, stating "Where her colleagues, even older, more experienced ones, usually lack emotion, the change in tone from confident ex-girlfriend to shaken ex-lover in “She’s Not Me” from Part 1 to Part 2 is chilling." He praised her vocals for being beyond her age, finishing his review by writing: "For now, she’s an exciting, young, impressive artist with a ceiling that has yet to be seen and a killer debut- I’m sure that will do. You can bet I’m going to do a much better job keeping tabs on Zara Larsson from here on out." Press Play OK gave 1 a more mixed review, writing: "Larsson’s songs unfortunately feel bereft of any substance based on life experience. "Skipping a Beat" takes a riff on that similar Olly Murs song, while Rooftop is simplistic."

== Commercial performance ==
1 managed to chart in three countries - it reached number 33 in Denmark, number 28 in Norway, and topped the Swedish Albums Chart.

== Track listing ==
No.	Title	Writer(s)	Producer(s)	Length
1.	"Skippin a Beat"	Jacob Kasher Hindlin; Rickard Göransson; Tove Lo; Kevin Figueiredo; Teddy Pena	O.C.; Kevin Figs; Mack^{[a]}	2:43
2.	"Wanna Be Your Baby"	Claude Kelly; Marcus "Mack" Sepehrmanesh; Colin Norman	Norman; Kelly; Robert Habolin	3:04
3.	"Rooftop"	Mack; Göransson; Mathieu Jomphe; Nick Ruth	Billboard; Ruth; Mack	3:59
4.	"Never Gonna Die"	Ethan "Baby E" Lowery; Tommy Tysper	Tysper; A.C.	3:46
5.	"Carry You Home"	Elof Loelv	Loelv	4:14
6.	"Can't Hold Back"	Ashley Rose; Melvin Hough II; Rivelino Wouter	Mel & Mus; Habolin^{[a]}	3:40
7.	"Weak Heart"	Mack; Robert Habolin; Patrizia Helander	Loelv; Habolin^{[a]}	2:59
8.	"If I Was Your Girl"	Mack; Tim Denéve; Ted Krotkiewski	JUNGLE; Mack^{[a]}	2:39
9.	"Secret"	Elina Stridh; Simon Hassle; Benjamin Johansson; Grace Tither	Hassle; Johansson	2:43
10.	"Endless"	Erik Hassle; Daniel Ledinsky; Andre Price	Grizzly	2:46
11.	"Still in My Blood"	Alx Reuterskiöld; Kim Wennerström	Habolin	3:11
12.	"Uncover" (2014 version)	Mack; Habolin; Gavin Jones	Habolin; Erik Arvinder	3:34
13.	"Bad Boys"	Mack	Loelv; Mack^{[a]}; Habolin^{[a]}	2:09
14.	"She's Not Me, Pt. 1 and Pt. 2"	Mack; Joel Humlin	Mack; Naiv	5:33
Total length:				47:00

Notes

- ^{^[a]} signifies a vocal producer

== Personnel ==
Credits adapted from the liner notes of 1.

Performers and musicians

- Zara Larsson – vocals
- Mel & Mus – all instruments (track 6)

Production

- A.C. – production (track 4)
- Nicki Adamsson – vocals engineering (track 3)
- Erik Arvinder – strings recording (track 12), strings arrangement (track 12)
- Billboard – production (track 3)
- Adel Dahdal – mixing (track 9)
- Björn Engelmann – mastering (tracks 12, 14)
- Kevin Figs – production (track 1)
- Chris Gehringer – mastering (tracks 1–11, 13)
- Serban Ghenea – mixing (track 4)
- Grizzly – production (track 10), mixing (track 10)
- Ola Håkansson – executive production
- Robert Habolin – production (tracks 2, 11–12), vocal production (tracks 6–7, 13), vocal recording (tracks 6–7, 13), mixing (tracks 6, 11–12), recording (track 12)
- John Hanes – engineered for mix
- Simon Hassle – production (track 9)
- Benjamin Johansson – production (track 9)
- JUNGLE – production (track 8), mixing (track 8)
- Claude Kelly – production (track 2)
- Zara Larsson – executive production
- Elof Loelv – production (tracks 5, 7, 13), mixing (tracks 5, 7, 13)
- Mack – executive production, production (track 14), vocal production (tracks 1, 3, 8, 13), vocal recording (tracks 1, 13)
- Erik Madrid – mixing (track 3)
- Mel & Mus – production (track 6)
- Naiv – production (track 14), mixing (track 14)
- Nicki & Hampus – mixing (track 1)
- Colin Norman – production (track 2)
- O.C. – production (track 1)
- Daniela Rivera – additional engineering (track 2)
- Nick Ruth – production (track 3)
- Phil Tan – mixing (track 2)
- Tommy Tysper – production (track 4)
- Vincent Vu – mixing assistant (track 3)

Design and management

- Linnea Aarflot – art direction
- Atena Banisaid – product management
- Fredrik Etoall – photography
- Mack – A&R
- Emma Svensson – photography

== Charts ==
=== Weekly charts ===
Chart (2014–15)	Peak position
Danish Albums (Hitlisten)	33
Norwegian Albums (VG-lista)	28
Swedish Albums (Sverigetopplistan)	1

=== Year-end charts ===
Chart (2014)	Position
Swedish Albums (Sverigetopplistan)	59
Chart (2015)	Position
Swedish Albums (Sverigetopplistan)	39

== Certifications ==
Region	Certification	Certified units/sales
Denmark (IFPI Danmark)	Gold	10,000^{‡}
Norway (IFPI Norway)	Platinum	20,000^{‡}
Sweden (GLF)	Platinum	40,000^{‡}
^{‡} Sales+streaming figures based on certification alone.

== Release history ==
Region	Date	Format	Label	Ref.
Sweden	1 October 2014	CD; digital download; streaming	TEN; Universal	
Denmark	6 October 2014	Digital download; streaming	TEN; Epic	
Norway	6 October 2014	Digital download; streaming	TEN; Epic	
Worldwide	30 January 2024	Digital download; streaming	TEN; Epic	
