= Bad Boys (Zara Larsson song) =

Single by Zara Larsson

from the album 1
- Released: 13 October 2013
- Length: 2:09
- Label: TEN; Universal
- Songwriter: Marcus "Mack" Sepehrmanesh
- Producer: Elof Loelv

Zara Larsson singles chronology
"She's Not Me" (2013)	"Bad Boys" (2013)	"Carry You Home" (2014)

Music video
- "Bad Boys" on YouTube

"Bad Boys" is a song by Swedish singer Zara Larsson. It was released on 13 October 2013 through TEN Music Group and Universal Music Group as the lead single from her debut album, 1 (2014). The song was written by Marcus "Mack" Sepehrmanesh, and was produced by Elof Loelv. "Bad Boys" peaked at number 27 in Sweden, and at number 33 in Denmark where it was certified Gold.

== Music video ==
A music video for the song was released on 29 October 2013, directed by Måns Nyman.

== Track listing ==
Digital download
No.	Title	Length
1.	"Bad Boys"	2:13
2.	"Bad Boys" (Do It Yourself Version)	2:13

== Charts ==
=== Weekly charts ===
"Bad Boys" weekly charts
Chart (2013–14)	Peak position
Denmark (Tracklisten)	33
Sweden (Sverigetopplistan)	27

== Certifications ==
"Bad Boys" certifications
Region	Certification	Certified units/sales
Denmark (IFPI Danmark)	Gold	900,000^{†}
^{†} Streaming-only figures based on certification alone.

== Release history ==
"Bad Boys" release history
Region	Date	Format	Label	References
Various	13 October 2013	Digital download; streaming	TEN; Epic; Sony	
