= Honor the Light =

EP by Zara Larsson
- Released: 1 December 2023
- Length: 15:42
- Labels: Sommer House; Epic
- Producer: Act Social

Zara Larsson chronology
Poster Girl (2021)	Honor the Light (2023)	Venus (2024)

Singles from Honor the Light
- 1. "Memory Lane" Released: 24 November 2023; 2. "Winter Song" Released: 24 November 2023; 3. "Silent Night" Released: 6 December 2023

Honor the Light is the fourth EP by Swedish singer Zara Larsson. It was released on 1 December 2023 by Sommer House and Epic. The EP was announced on 22 November 2023 and peaked at number one on the Swedish Albums Chart. It was preceded by the singles "Memory Lane" and "Winter Song".

== Background and release ==
Ahead of her fourth studio album, Venus, Zara Larsson announced a holiday-themed EP titled Honor the Light. The EP was released on 1 December 2023 via Sommer House and Epic Records. Two tracks, "Memory Lane" and "Winter Song", were pre-released on 24 November. The EP includes six songs, including Swedish-language tracks such as "Tänd Ett Ljus" and "Sankta Lucia". On 6 December 2023, "Silent Night" was sent to radio station, serving as the third single.

== Composition ==
"Memory Lane" is an original song co-created with Swedish folk-pop duo First Aid Kit. Their vocals previously appeared on an alternate version of "I Need Love" from Larsson's Poster Girl (2021). In this track, the trio crafts a nostalgic yet uplifting ode to the streets of Stockholm, blending past and present in a lyrical winter stroll. The lyrics express gratitude toward one's former self—the person who endured and grew, making the current self possible. "Winter Song" is a tender reinterpretation of the seasonal classic by Sara Bareilles and Ingrid Michaelson. Alongside this cover, the EP includes songs rooted in Swedish Lucia traditions as well as renditions of more widely recognized Christmas carols. Each track was designed to align with the three-part Honor the Light concert series planned for December 2025, where Larsson will also perform acoustic versions of songs from her past discography in a more intimate, unplugged style.

== Track listing ==
All tracks were produced by Act Social.

Honor the Light track listing
No.	Title	Writer(s)	Length
1.	"Memory Lane"	Zara Larsson; Elvira Anderfjärd; Klara Söderberg	3:12
2.	"Winter Song"	Sara Bareilles; Ingrid Michaelson	3:05
3.	"Silent Night"	Traditional	1:42
4.	"Light a Candle"	Lasse Lindbom; Niklas Strömstedt	3:10
5.	"Tänd ett ljus"	Lindbom; Stromstedt	3:10
6.	"Sankta Lucia"	Traditional	1:22
Total length:			15:42

== Personnel ==
Musicians

- Zara Larsson – lead vocals, background vocals
- Act Social – bass, drum machine, keyboards, synthesizer (all tracks); guitar (tracks 2–6), background vocals (2, 3)
- Astrid Granstrom – background vocals (tracks 1, 4, 5)
- Esther Kirabo – background vocals (tracks 1, 4, 5)
- Isabelle Gbotto – background vocals (tracks 1, 4, 5)
- Marlene Lindahl – background vocals (tracks 1, 4, 5)
- Matilda Gratte – background vocals (tracks 1, 4, 5)

Technical

- Act Social – production, engineering, vocal engineering, programming, arrangement
- Joe LaPorta – mastering
- Wez Clarke – mixing
- Stephanie D'Arcy – engineering (tracks 3, 4)
- Joy Deb – vocal engineering (tracks 1, 4–6)
- Sophia De Mira – engineering assistance (tracks 3, 4)

== Charts ==
Chart performance for Honor the Light
Chart (2023)	Peak position
Swedish Albums (Sverigetopplistan)	1

== See also ==
- List of number-one singles and albums in Sweden
