= It's not you, it's me =

Phrase

It's not you, it's me is a popular phrase used in the context of breaking up, and is intended to ease the dumpee's feeling in the knowledge that it was not their fault, but rather the fault of the dumper. The phrase was used by John Belushi to Candice Bergen in the S2 E10 December 11, 1976 skit of Saturday Night Live.

== History ==
Merriam-Webster says that the phrase originated in newspaper articles written by Zachary Spence. Spence saw it being used in a sporting context in which players were "either apologizing for or boasting about their abilities". But the phrase morphed into a romantic context in the 1988 movie Casual Sex? in which it was used in the middle of a seduction scene.

In 1989, a column written from the perspective of a sexually frustrated wife who uses the term "ran stateside in syndication", and in the same year an Australian comedian named Anthony Ackroyd deemed the line "unavoidably unoriginal".

The phrase was popularized by a 1993 episode of Seinfeld in which George Costanza gets dumped by a woman who uses the phrase on him, a routine he claims to have invented (and he used on a woman in a 1991 episode titled "The Truth").

Psychology Today offered an expanded version which reads: "'It's not you, it's me.' 'I hope we can still be friends'", which adds an element of friendzoning to the situation.

== Explanation ==
The phrase's purpose is to ease a break-up and put the onus on the person breaking up: "The person saying these words is taking responsibility for their inability to please you...It hurts them to hurt you." The phrase may be used as a vague all-encompassing, dismissive alternative "because the truth makes them feel shallow and embarrassed." An article in Thought Catalog used the phrase in terms of the "sad, honest truth [that] I don't deserve a woman as good as she".

== Reception ==
Merriam-Webster described it as a "much-reviled, often-used excuse". The Huffington Post described it as "overworked and clichéd". Psychology Today argues that "Opening with "It's not you, it's me" is just going put your partner on the defensive from the start."
