= Weak Heart =

- The Remixes cover

Single by Zara Larsson

from the album 1
- Released: 12 January 2015
- Recorded: 2014
- Length: 3:00
- Label: TEN
- Songwriter(s): Marcus "Mack" Sepehrmanesh; Robert Habolin; Patrizia Helander
- Producer(s): Elof Loelv; Robert Habolin

Zara Larsson singles chronology
"Rooftop" (2014)	"Weak Heart" (2015)	"Lush Life" (2015)

Music video
- "Weak Heart" on YouTube

"Weak Heart" is a song by Swedish singer Zara Larsson. It was released on 12 January 2015 through TEN Music Group as the fourth and final single from her debut album 1 (2014). The single peaked at number 53 in Sweden, becoming her first song to not chart within the top 30 and her only single not to achieve any accreditation. In a review of the album, the track was highlighted as being a touching and more emotional track.

== Chart performance ==
"Weak Heart" debuted at number 53 in Sweden and spent four weeks on the chart.

== Music video ==
The music video for the song was released on 5 December 2014, directed by David Soutar. The video sees Larsson riding a horse.

== Track listing ==
Digital download – Remixes
No.	Title	Length
1.	"Weak Heart"	3:00
2.	"Weak Heart" (Sam Crow & Mack Remix)	3:15
3.	"Weak Heart" (Don Palm Remix)	3:16
4.	"Weak Heart" (Do It Yourself Version)	3:00

== Charts ==
"Weak Heart" chart performance
Chart (2015)	Peak position
Sweden (Sverigetopplistan)	53

== Release history ==
"Weak Heart" release history
Region	Date	Format	Label
Various	12 January 2015	Digital download; streaming	TEN
