= She's Not Me =

Song by Swedish singer Zara Larsson

Single by Zara Larsson

from the EP Allow Me to Reintroduce Myself
- A-side: "She's Not Me" (Pt. 1)
- B-side: "She's Not Me" (Pt. 2)
- Released: 26 June 2013
- Recorded: 2012
- Length: 2:52 (Pt. 1); 2:48 (Pt. 2)
- Label: TEN; Universal
- Songwriters: Marcus "Mack" Sepehrmanesh; Joel Humlen
- Producers: Mack; Naiv

Zara Larsson singles chronology
"Uncover" (2013)	"She's Not Me" (2013)	"Bad Boys" (2013)

Music videos
- "She's Not Me (Pt. 1)" on YouTube; "She's Not Me (Pt. 2)" on YouTube

"She's Not Me" is a two-part song by Swedish singer Zara Larsson. Both parts were released as tracks from her second extended play, Allow Me to Reintroduce Myself on 26 June 2013 by TEN Music Group and Universal. A combined version of both parts is featured on her debut album 1 (2014), and her third EP Uncover (2015). Part one of the song peaked at number 21 in Sweden and was certified Gold by the GLF.

== Music video ==
Music videos for both parts were released on 27 March 2013 and 17 June 2013, respectively.

== Track listing ==
Digital download
No.	Title	Length
1.	"She's Not Me" (Pt. 1)	2:52
2.	"She's Not Me" (Pt. 2)	2:48

== Charts ==
=== Weekly charts ===
"She's Not Me" weekly charts
Chart (2013)	Peak position
Sweden (Sverigetopplistan) Part One	21

== Certifications ==
"She's Not Me" certifications
Region	Certification	Certified units/sales
Norway (IFPI Norway)	Gold	30,000^{‡}
Sweden (GLF)	Gold	20,000^{‡}
^{‡} Sales+streaming figures based on certification alone.

== Release history ==
"She's Not Me" release history
Region	Date	Format	Label	Ref.
Sweden	26 June 2013	Digital download	TEN; Universal	
