= Holding Out for You =

Single by Fedez featuring Zara Larsson

from the album Paranoia Airlines
- Released: 11 January 2019
- Length: 3:01
- Label: Sony
- Songwriters: Federico Lucia; Zara Larsson; Dani Poppitt; Daniele Lazzarin; Giovanni Grandi; Lorenzo Sarti; Giovanni Cerrati; Iacopo Pinna; Michele Canova
- Producer: Michele Canova

Fedez singles chronology
"Che cazzo ridi" (2019)	"Holding Out for You" (2019)	"Le feste di Pablo" (2020)

Zara Larsson singles chronology
"Ruin My Life" (2018)	"Holding Out for You" (2019)	"Don't Worry Bout Me" (2019)

Music video
- "Holding Out for You" on YouTube

"Holding Out for You" is a song co-written and recorded by Italian rapper Fedez featuring guest vocals by Swedish singer Zara Larsson. It was released on 11 January 2019 by Sony Music as the third single from his fifth studio album Paranoia Airlines.

== Music video ==
The song's music video was premiered 15 January 2019 on the Vevo rapper channel - YouTube and it was filmed at the San Pellegrino Terme casino presenting Fedez and Zara Larsson as protagonists.

== Track listing ==
- Digital download
1. "Holding Out for You" (featuring Zara Larsson) – 3:01

== Charts ==
Chart performance for "Holding Out for You"
Chart (2019)	Peak position
Italy (FIMI)	4
Italy Digital Song Sales (Billboard)	5

== Certifications ==
Region	Certification	Certified units/sales
Italy (FIMI)	Gold	25,000^{‡}
^{‡} Sales+streaming figures based on certification alone.
