= Zara Larsson =

Swedish singer-songwriter (born 1997)

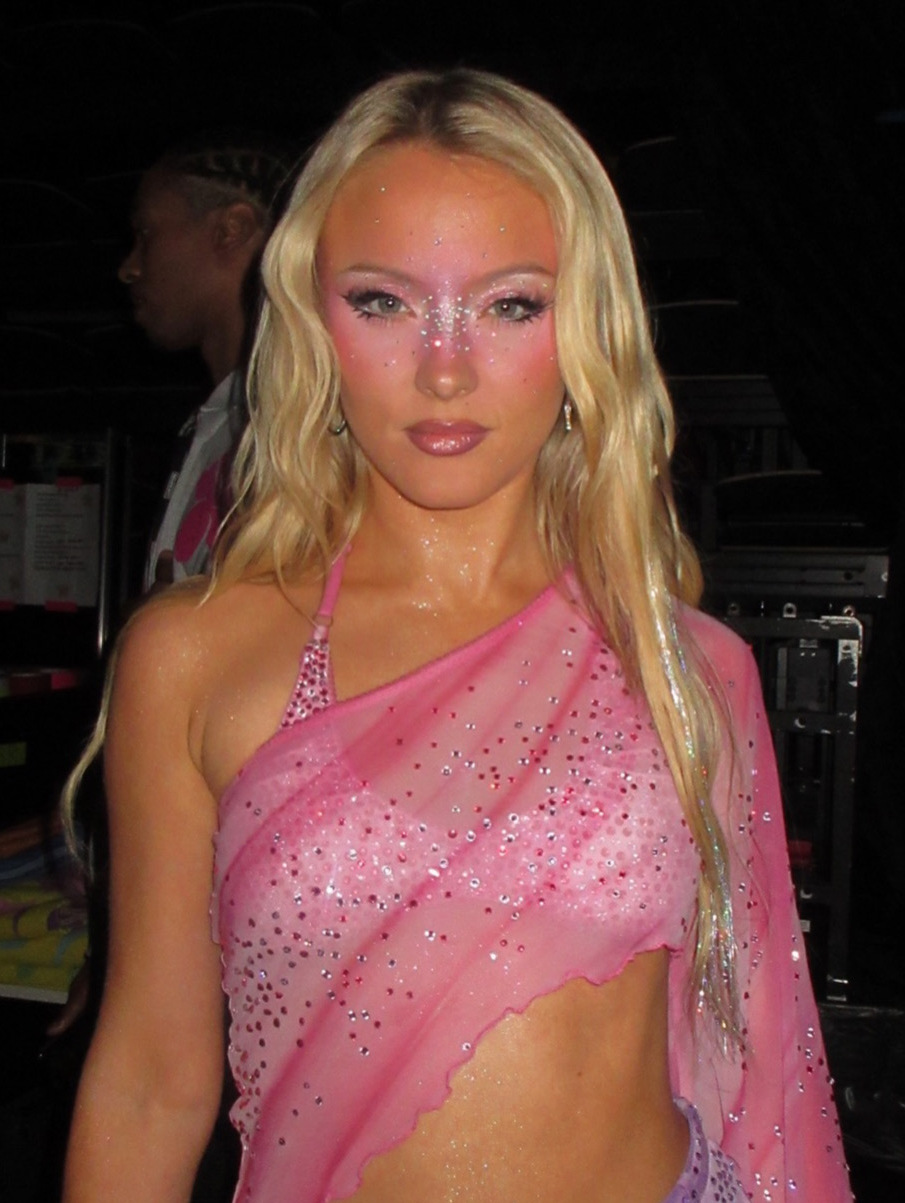
- Larsson in 2025

Background information
- Born: Zara Maria Larsson; 16 December 1997 (age 28); Solna, Stockholm County, Sweden
- Genres: Pop; house; dance
- Occupations: Singer; songwriter
- Instrument: Vocals
- Works: Discography
- Years active: 2008–present
- Labels: Sommer House; Epic; Black Butter; TEN; Universal Sweden; RCA
- Awards: Full list
- Website: zaralarssonofficial.com

Zara Maria Larsson (Swedish: [ˈsɑ̂ːra ˈlɑ̌ːʂɔn]; born 16 December 1997) is a Swedish singer~~-~~songwriter. She rose to prominence in Sweden in 2008 after winning the second season of Talang. Larsson signed with Ten Music Group in 2012 and released her debut EP, Introducing, in 2013. Its single "Uncover" topped the charts only in Sweden and Norway. Her debut studio album, 1 (2014), produced the Swedish top-ten singles "Carry You Home" and "Rooftop".

Larsson signed with Epic Records and released her international debut album, So Good, in 2017. It topped the Swedish charts and reached the top ten in seven other countries, with "Lush Life", "Never Forget You", "Ain't My Fault", and "I Would Like" achieving international success. She was featured on Clean Bandit's "Symphony", which topped the charts in the UK, Sweden, and Norway. Her third studio album, Poster Girl (2021), followed, peaking number three in Sweden.

In 2022, Larsson left Ten Music Group and acquired her music catalogue. Her fourth studio album, Venus (2024), became her first major release under her own label, Sommer House. She also made her acting debut in the Swedish Netflix drama A Part of You (2024). In 2025, she released her fifth studio album, Midnight Sun, to widespread critical acclaim. Its title track became Larsson's highest charting solo entry on the US Billboard Hot 100, and earned her a Grammy Award nomination for Best Dance Pop Recording. The following year, her collaboration with PinkPantheress, "Stateside + Zara Larsson", topped the Billboard Global 200.

In Sweden, Larsson has achieved a total of five number one singles on the Sverigetopplistan chart, three number one albums, with her EP Honor the Light (2023) also topping the charts. She is the recipient of two American Music Awards, a Bambi Award, four Grammis awards, four MTV Europe Music Awards, and has been nominated for four Brit Awards and two Grammy Awards.

== Early life ==
Larsson was born on 16 December 1997 in Solna, Stockholm, to Agnetha and Anders Larsson. In an interview with Svenska Dagbladet in July 2015, she said that she was born "dead" due to a lack of oxygen from a nuchal cord. Larsson grew up in Tallkrogen in Enskede, south of Stockholm. Her mother is a nursing assistant and her father is a former military officer.

Her first primary school was the Gubbängsskolan. During third grade, Larsson also attended school in Ko Lanta, Thailand. She later attended the Royal Swedish Ballet School, where she studied until the age of 15. She attended the secondary school Kulturama, an art school in Stockholm. She has cited Carola Häggkvist and Whitney Houston as early inspirations. She has said that since the age of five she knew that she wanted to become "immortal" like Elvis Presley.

She has a sister, Hanna, who is three years younger and is a singer and member of the band Lennix.

== Career ==
=== 2008–2011: Career beginnings on Swedish television ===
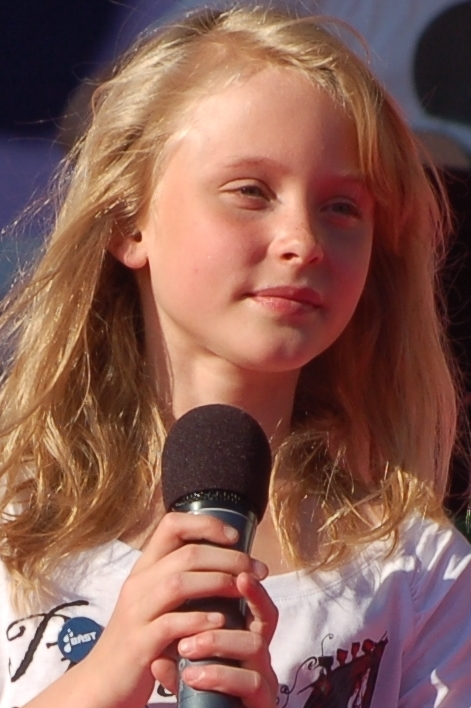
Larsson singing on Sommarkrysset in 2008

Larsson won the 2008 season of Talang, the Swedish adaptation of Got Talent, at the age of 10, winning 500,000 kronor. "My Heart Will Go On", the song she sang in the final, originally sung by Celine Dion, was later released that year as Larsson's debut single, charting at the official Swedish Singles Chart, Sverigetopplistan, for six consecutive weeks and peaking there at number seven for one week. She started singing on Sommarkrysset ("The Summer Cross"), another Swedish TV program. Between December 2009 and January 2010, Larsson participated in a reality TV series called Jag ska bli stjärna (transl. I shall become a star), where she and other young Swedish talents got help on the difficult road to international fame and success. She was managed by Laila Bagge, and they flew to Los Angeles in the United States, where they visited and talked with Disney and three big record label companies (Universal Music Group, Sony Music, and Warner Music Group) but did not get a contract offer anywhere, which Larsson later attributed to her age at that time.

=== 2012–2017: Commercial success with 1 and So Good ===
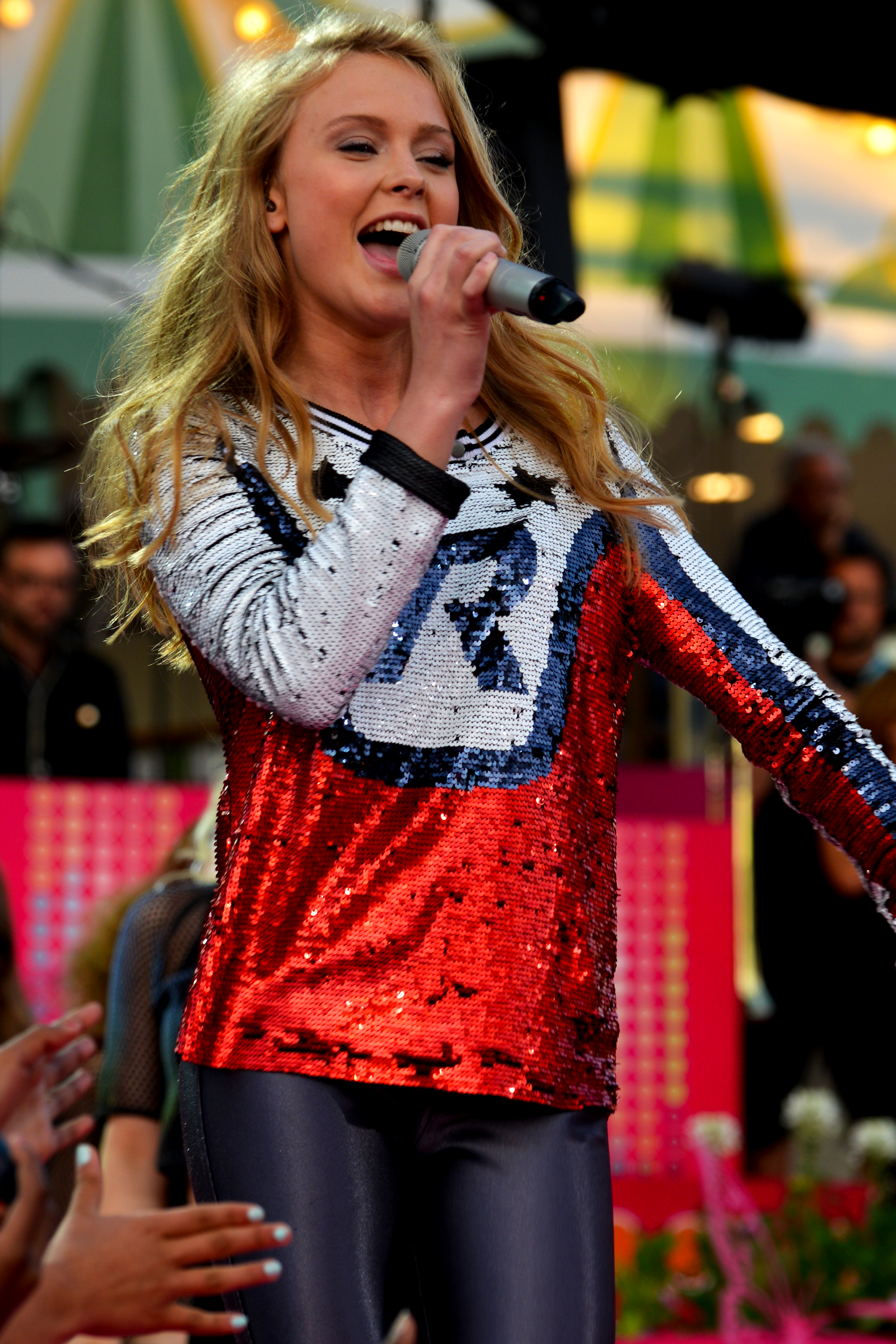
Larsson singing on Sommarkrysset in 2013

Larsson signed with TEN Music Group in 2012 at age 15 to record her debut compilation recording. The recording, the extended play (EP) Introducing, was revealed on 9 December 2012 through an unofficial music video of "Uncover" on YouTube, a static-view video featuring her singing the whole song in the recording studio in one whole continuous take. The five-song EP was released in Scandinavia on 21 January 2013, consisting exclusively of original songs. "Uncover" was released as the EP's lead single. It peaked at number one on both the Sverigetopplistan and DigiListan charts, as well as reaching number one in Norway and peaking at number three in Denmark, and by 25 February 2013, the song was certified platinum in Sweden by Universal Music Sweden as a result of the song having received over five million streams. The song entered the Svensktoppen track lists. In July 2013, at Sommarkrysset in Gröna Lund, she received a 3× platinum award for Introducing for selling over 120,000 copies in Sweden.

On 27 March 2013, Larsson's next EP was revealed through a music video of "She's Not Me (Pt. 1)" on YouTube. The five-song EP, Allow Me to Reintroduce Myself, was released in Scandinavia on 5 July 2013. "She's Not Me", consisting of "She's Not Me (Pt. 1)" and "She's Not Me (Pt. 2)", was released as a double-single on 25 June 2013. On 3 April 2013, Larsson revealed on her blog that she had signed a three-year contract with Epic Records in the United States. On 11 December 2013, Larsson performed at the Nobel Peace Prize Concert in Oslo. On 1 October 2014, Larsson released her Scandinavian debut studio album 1, including the songs "Uncover", "Bad Boys" and "She's Not Me" (Pt. 1 and Pt. 2), in Scandinavia. The version of "Uncover" in the album was a newer recording by Larsson from 2014. The album went platinum in Sweden. Larsson was an opening act for English singer Cher Lloyd's I Wish Tour.

On 15 January 2015, Larsson released Uncover, her first international EP, containing songs from her album 1. On 5 June 2015, Larsson released the single "Lush Life" from her upcoming second studio album. The song became her second number one single and was certified 4× platinum in Sweden. The song reached the top five in 18 countries and was certified platinum in 16 countries. On 22 July 2015, Larsson released her collaboration with British singer MNEK, "Never Forget You", the second single from her upcoming album. The song reached number one in Sweden, number three in Australia, and number five in the United Kingdom. The song was certified platinum in Sweden after two weeks.

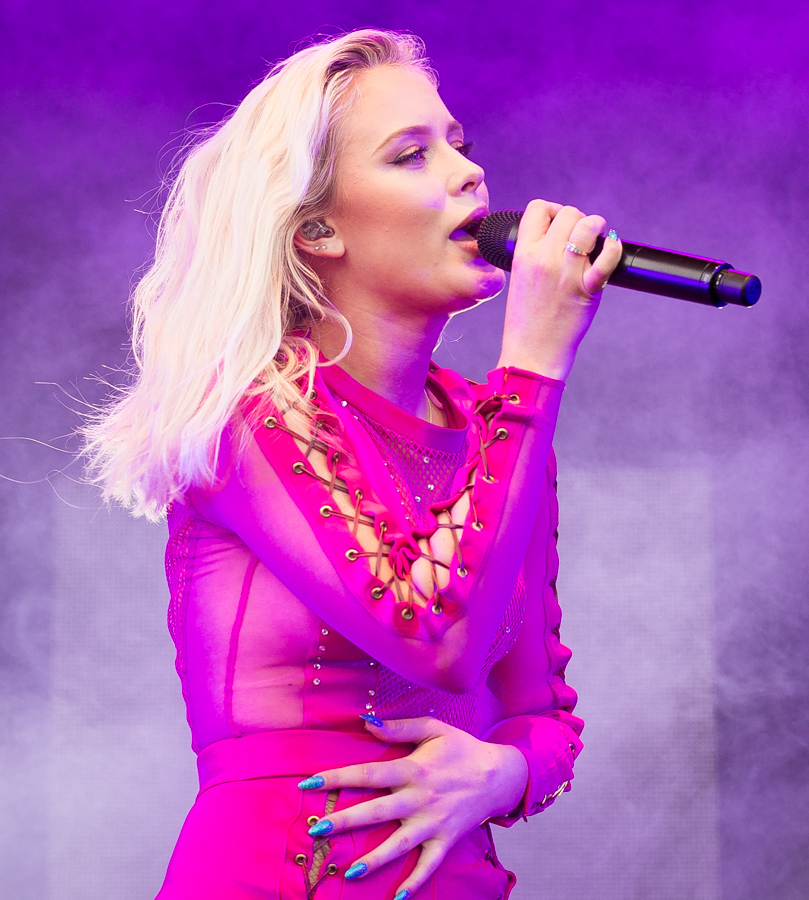
Larsson during Stavernfestivalen 2016

In February 2016, Tinie Tempah released "Girls Like" featuring Larsson. Larsson was later featured in the official song of UEFA Euro 2016, David Guetta's "This One's for You". On 1 September 2016, Larsson released "Ain't My Fault", the third single from her upcoming album. On 22 October 2016, Larsson was named one of Time's "30 Most Influential Teens of 2016". She released "I Would Like", the fourth single from her upcoming album, on 11 November 2016. It peaked at number two in the United Kingdom and at number four in Sweden.

In January 2017, Larsson released "So Good", featuring American singer Ty Dolla Sign. The single served as the fifth single from her second album of the same name, which was released on 17 March 2017 as her first international album. The album also features a collaboration with Wizkid titled "Sundown". "Symphony" by Clean Bandit featuring Larsson was included as a bonus track, was released as a single on the same date and became Larsson's fifth number one single in her home country and first number one single in the United Kingdom. The album became her second number one album in Sweden and peaked in the top ten in Australia, Denmark, Finland, Netherlands, New Zealand, Norway and the United Kingdom. On 12 May 2017, Larsson released a music video for "Don't Let Me Be Yours" as the sixth single from So Good. On 18 May 2017, Larsson released an H&M collection containing various garments and accessories. On 11 August 2017, "Only You" was released as the seventh and final single from So Good.

=== 2017–2024: Poster Girl and Venus ===
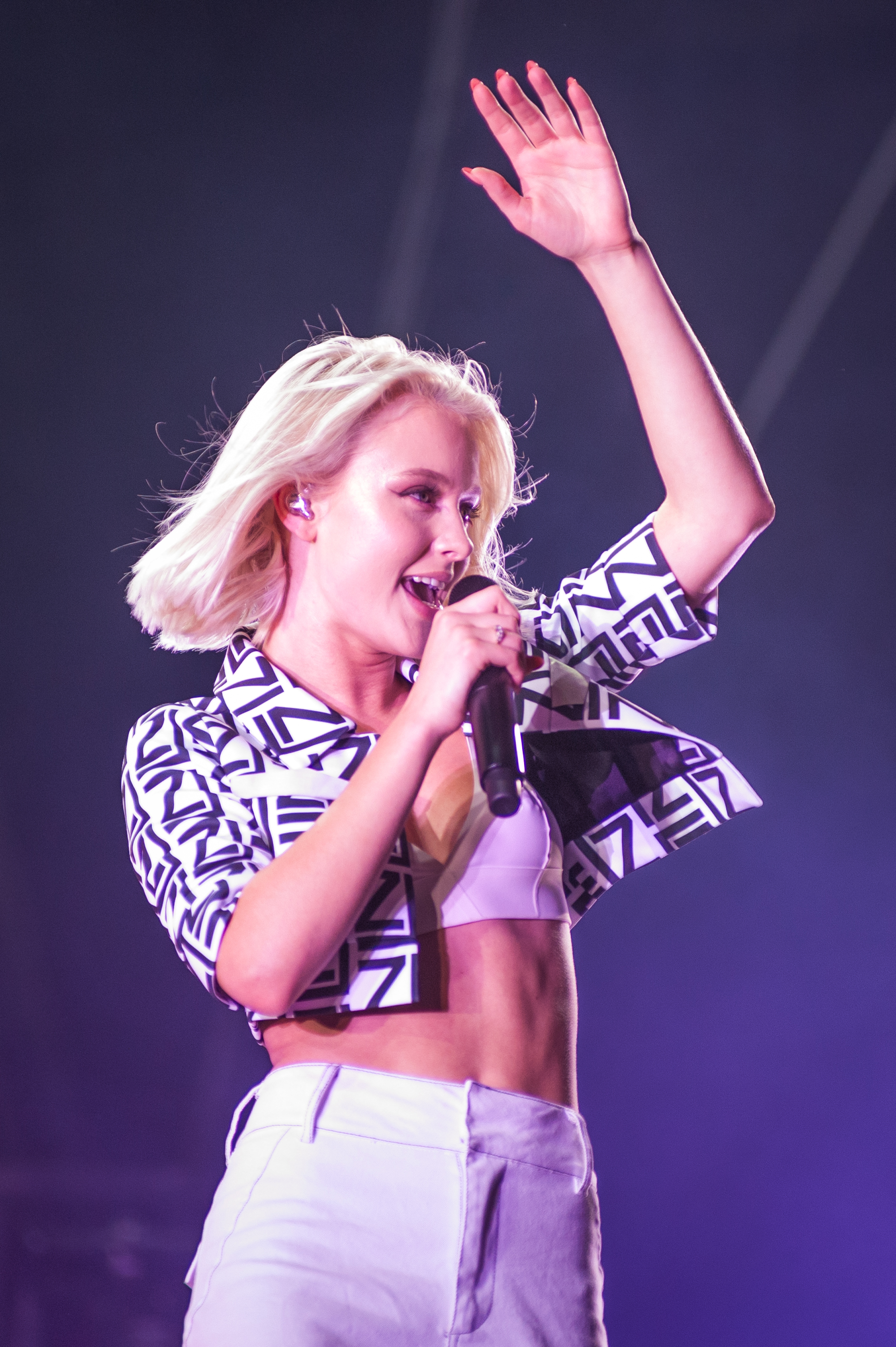
Larsson performing at the Ilosaarirock festival in July 2018

In September 2017, Larsson announced that she had started working on her third studio album, saying in an interview she had written two new songs with MNEK. On 11 December 2017, Larsson once again performed at the Nobel Peace Prize Concert, this time alongside American singer John Legend. In January 2018, Larsson was named on Forbes' "30 Under 30 Europe" list in the entertainment category. In September 2018, Larsson announced the lead single from her third studio album, "Ruin My Life". She released the song and music video on 18 October 2018. The track was commercially successful worldwide, being certified at least gold in the US and the UK, while reaching number one in the Netherlands. In 2019, Larsson released the follow-up singles "Don't Worry Bout Me" and "All the Time", as well as the then promotional single "Wow".

In January 2019, Larsson was featured on the song "Holding Out for You" by Italian rapper Fedez. On 8 November 2019, Larsson's next single, "Invisible", taken from the 2019 movie Klaus, the first original animated feature film released on Netflix, was released on the same day the film was released. In March 2020, Larsson was featured on Kygo's single, "Like It Is", alongside American rapper Tyga. The song has performed moderately well, becoming a top-five song in Sweden, New Zealand, and Norway. Farrell Sweeney of Dancing Astronaut wrote that the song features "enamoring vocals by Larsson, immediately pulling the listener into the catchy commercial fabric" of the song. Sweeney also felt that Tyga's rap verse after the first drop was "surprising" and gave the song an "unexpected twist".

In June 2020, Larsson announced the single "Love Me Land" through Instagram. She released the song and music video on 10 July 2020. On the same day, an interview with her and Sveriges Radio was published. She announced that her new album would be released after 2020. She also said: "I am prepared in a completely different way. I have the next song ready, album cover, the video, the album is done. I just feel ready in a different way." It was then revealed on her Spotify page that the album would be called Love Me Land and that the title track was the first single from the album. Larsson later clarified in an interview that the album is titled Poster Girl and that "Wow" would also be included on the album, after officially announcing it as a single on 26 August 2020. In August 2020, Larsson collaborated with Swedish singer Carola Häggkvist on a cover of Häggkvist's 1983 song "Säg mig var du står", which was released as a single in Scandinavia. Larsson later selected "Säg mig var du står" as the final song in Rolling Stone's "My Life in 10 Songs" feature, describing Häggkvist as "the voice of Sweden" and discussing how Häggkvist influenced her vocal style and the type of artist she wanted to become.

In September 2020, Larsson released a remix of "Wow" featuring American singer Sabrina Carpenter. On 8 January 2021, she released "Talk About Love" featuring American rapper Young Thug as the third single from Poster Girl. Poster Girl was released on 5 March 2021 to positive reviews. The album performed moderately commercially, debuting at number three on the Swedish Albums Chart, 12 on the UK Albums Chart, and 170 on the US Billboard 200. On 21 May 2021, Larsson released a summer edition of Poster Girl. She also performed songs at a virtual party on Roblox to celebrate her new album.

On 22 April 2022, Larsson released "Words" with Swedish DJ Alesso. The song was a moderate success in Europe, reaching the top five in Sweden and the top 40 in Flanders, Croatia, Hungary, the Netherlands, Norway, Poland and the United Kingdom. In June 2022, Larsson announced that she had left TEN Music Group to start her own record label named Sommer House and acquired ownership over her musical catalogue in the process. She also renewed her contract with Epic Records with all future releases from then on being released under her own label Sommer House under exclusive licence to Epic Records in the US and be distributed by Sony Sweden in Sweden.

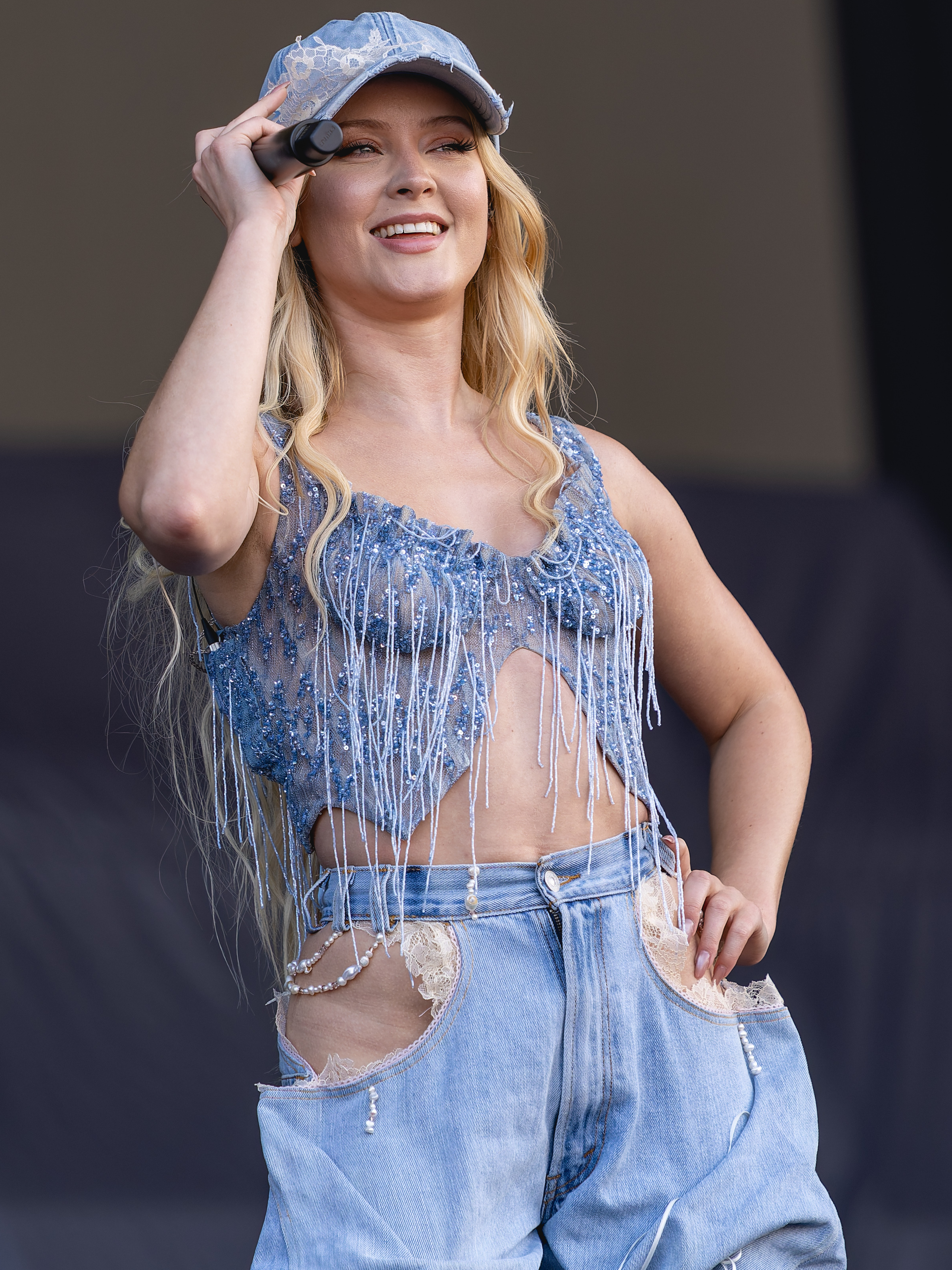
Larsson performing at the Isle of Wight Festival in June 2024

On 27 January 2023, Larsson released "Can't Tame Her", the lead single from her fourth studio album, Venus. The track reached number 25 in the UK, and number five in Sweden. Subsequently, she released "End of Time" on 19 May 2023 as the second single from the album. The third single from the album, "On My Love", was released on 15 September 2023 in collaboration with French DJ David Guetta. It reached number 15 in the UK, and number three in Sweden. On 26 October 2023, Larsson officially announced Venus and made it available for pre-order. On the same day, she also revealed the Venus Tour, a European headlining tour in support of the album, set to begin in February 2024. On 1 December 2023, Larsson released her holiday EP Honor the Light. On 19 January 2024, "You Love Who You Love" was released as the fourth single from the album. Venus was released on 9 February 2024 to generally positive reviews from critics. On 3 April 2024, Larsson released a streamed concert, Venus Tour, recorded at AFAS Live in Amsterdam and released via the pay-per-view platform On Air.

On 15 May 2023, Netflix Nordic's official Twitter account announced a new film called A Part of You, which was then released on 31 May 2024. The main cast consists of Larsson, Felicia Maxime and Edvin Ryding.

=== 2025–present: Midnight Sun ===
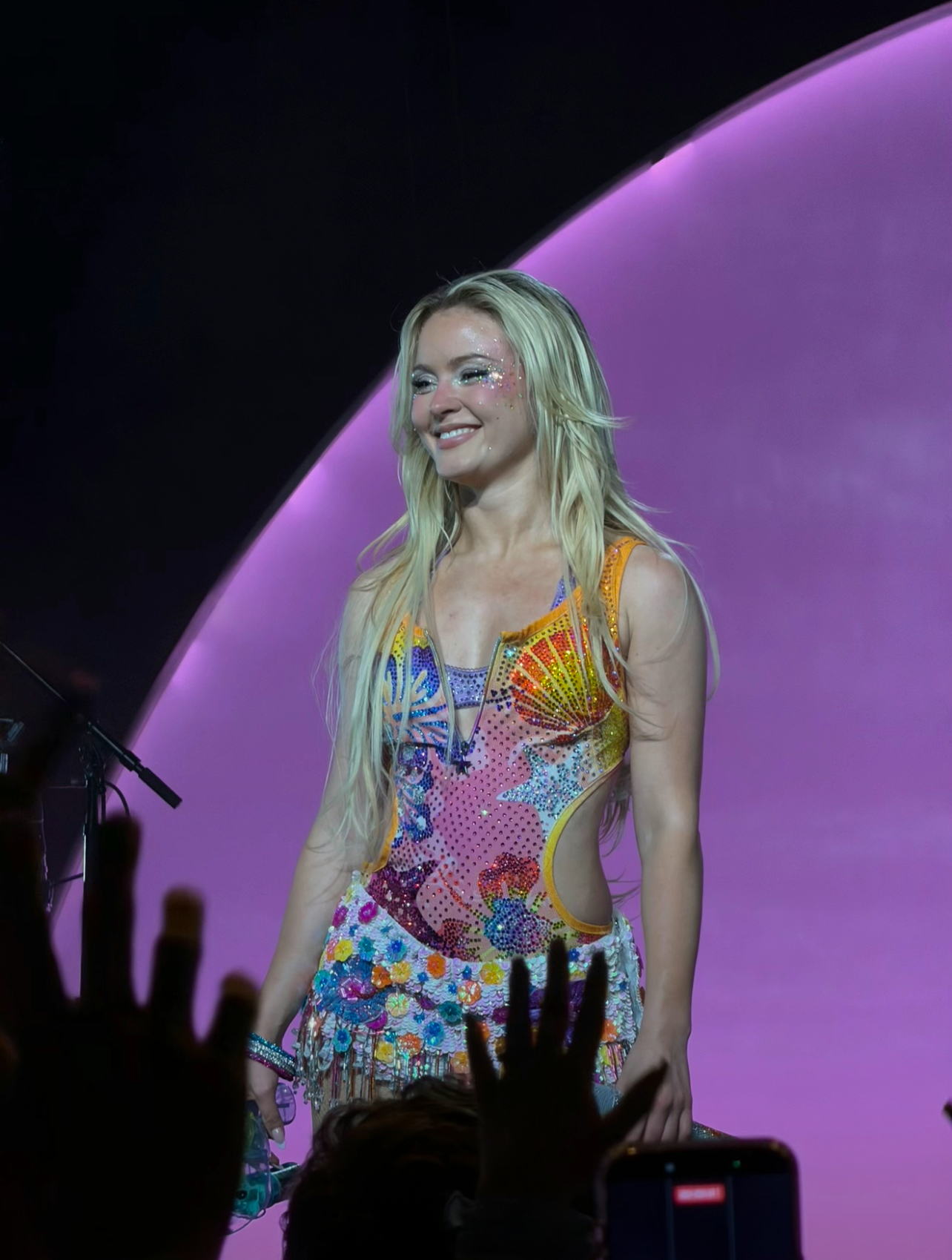
Larsson performing on the Midnight Sun Tour in April 2026

On 25 April 2025, Larsson released "Pretty Ugly", the lead single from her fifth studio album, Midnight Sun. The title track was released on 13 June 2025 as the second single from the album and received a nomination for Best Dance Pop Recording at the 68th Annual Grammy Awards, becoming Larsson's first Grammy nomination. The track achieved commercial success, peaking at number four in Sweden and number 7 in the United Kingdom. It also became Larsson's highest charging solo entry on the US Billboard Hot 100, peaking at number 13. The album was released on 26 September 2025 to critical acclaim. Larsson joined Tate McRae as a supporting act on the North American leg of the Miss Possessive Tour from August to September 2025 before embarking on the Midnight Sun Tour in October 2025. Following the album's initial release, she expanded the project into a collaboration and remix edition featuring artists such as British singer PinkPantheress.

In May 2025, Larsson was announced as the support act for OneRepublic on their 2026 tour of Australia and New Zealand, but pulled out due to a scheduling conflict; her place was taken by Freya Ridings.

On 19 September 2025, Prime Video announced the global release of Zara Larsson – Up Close, a documentary directed by Lise Bergvall that follows Larsson's personal and professional life during the making of her album Midnight Sun. The film was released worldwide on 20 November 2025.

On 10 October 2025, Larsson's collaboration with PinkPantheress, "Stateside + Zara Larsson", a remix of "Stateside" was released, which was featured on the latter artist's remix album Fancy Some More?. The remix reached the top ten in several countries, including the United States, and topped the Billboard Global 200 chart. It won the award for Collaboration of the Year at the American Music Awards 2026, becoming Larsson's first overall win at the ceremony.

In November 2025, during the Midnight Sun Tour, a fan performed the choreography to "Lush Life" with Larsson onstage, causing the song to go viral. The track re-entered numerous record charts worldwide and achieved a new peak within the top 40 of the US Billboard Hot 100. It also appeared on the Billboard Global 200 for the first time, peaking at number eight.

On 1 May 2026, Larsson released the remix version of her album, Midnight Sun, titled Midnight Sun: Girls Trip, featuring remixes with Tyla, PinkPantheress, Shakira, Robyn, Madison Beer, Kehlani, and other artists. In June, Hits magazine reported that Larsson's manager, Roger Ames, was negotiating a new recording deal for her, with one corporate entity offering a "very large sum" to sign Larsson. The following month, it was revealed that she transferred to RCA Records. On 15 October 2026, Larsson released the music video for the album's fourth single, "Blue Moon". The song was nominated for Best Dance Pop Recording at the 69th Annual Grammy Awards.

== Personal life ==
In 2015, 17-year-old Zara Larsson hosted a 48-minute summer program on Sveriges Radio, becaming the program's youngest-ever speaker. In the talk, she spoke about her life, her music career, her feminist views, others' reactions to her, and her feelings about all of it. Larsson previously followed a vegetarian diet. She has spoken about her struggles with premenstrual dysphoric disorder. Between 2017 and 2019, Larsson dated English model Brian H. Whittaker. Since 2020, Larsson has been in a relationship with Swedish dancer Lamin Holmén.

== Views and activism ==
In January 2015, Larsson posted a picture on Instagram showing a condom wrapped around her leg and foot to refute the idea that penises can be too big for condoms to fit around. In 2019, she fronted a campaign from Durex and Product Red promoting sexual health awareness and raising money for treating AIDS in South Africa. In June 2015, Larsson criticised the Bråvalla Festival over its predominantly male lineup and questioned why she was not among its main acts despite being the most popular artist on Spotify among the festival's performers. Swedish singer Günther responded by accusing her of being overhyped by fake streaming numbers and lacking hits. Larsson responded during her performance by calling out Günther a "woman hater", while Günther received praise for his original response.

In April 2017, Larsson faced backlash after criticising the Netflix series 13 Reasons Why on Twitter, describing it as "meh" and arguing that it romanticised suicide and failed to address mental illness. She subsequently deleted the posts and acknowledged that she had not watched the entire first season when she made the comments. She later described the series as "not bad" and said that it was simply not to her taste.

In 2019, she became the face of Chinese technology company Huawei in Sweden. The partnership was criticised over Huawei's relationship with the Government of China and allegations concerning its human rights abuses. Larsson ended the partnership in 2020 and described it as "not the smartest deal" she had made, although Huawei stated that the agreement had been time-limited and had ended in 2019. Her comments about Huawei were followed by reports that her music had been removed from Apple Music in China.

In June 2023, Larsson was criticised for a response to a Twitter user who had mocked her decision to give an interview to Pop Crave. Larsson replied that McDonald's wanted to interview the user "for new shifts", which led to accusations of classism from fans and media outlets. The Independent reported that critics interpreted the remark as suggesting that working at a fast food restaurant was something to be ashamed of, while Fortune reported that other critics argued that the comment belittled working-class employment.

In January 2026, in response to the killing of Renée Good, Larsson shared a series of posts condemning the actions of the United States Immigration and Customs Enforcement (ICE), calling the agents "criminals". On 17 September 2026, she criticised the White House for using her song "Midnight Sun" in a TikTok video showing immigration enforcement raids. Following her criticism, the audio track was removed from the post. In March 2026, Larsson made a TikTok joke about a fan's abortion, replying to her comment "I killed the performance and then you killed it after the performance". The joke prompted backlash and she claimed she lost a commercial partnership worth approximately $3 million because of it. On 20 September 2026, Larsson cancelled her planned performance at the Abu Dhabi Grand Prix after fans urged her to boycott the event; the boycott calls were linked to concerns over the United Arab Emirates' alleged role in the war in Sudan. She was scheduled to perform on 3 December 2026 alongside Lewis Capaldi as part of the Yasalam After-Race Concerts.

=== Political views ===
Larsson identifies as a feminist. She attributes her openness of opinion on social media and in interviews to her parents, claiming: "Both my parents are very educated when it comes to social issues and being woke about what's going on in the world, and they've been very supportive of me having a voice". Additionally, Larsson has expressed opposition to toxic masculinity.

Larsson voted for the Left Party in the 2018 Swedish general election, the first one she was able to vote in. She told the Financial Times, "I wanted to vote for something that would never work with the rightwing parties. I've got way more money than my friends who are the same age as me, but I don't want a tax cut or not to bring in any immigrants. I don't mind if I have to pay more taxes if we can have a humane society." In the 2022 Swedish general election, she publicly endorsed the Left Party. In the 2026 Swedish general election, she publicly once again endorsed and encouraged her followers to vote for the Left Party.

On 11 May 2021, during the 2021 Israel–Palestine crisis, Larsson criticised Israel on Instagram for killing Palestinian civilians and upholding apartheid, while expressing the importance of standing against antisemitism. In October 2023, Larsson posted about the Gaza war, writing "Oh so it's stand with Ukraine when Russia invades but not Palestine". After receiving backlash and criticism that the post implied support for terrorism, she apologised, calling it "badly worded" and "thoughtlessly posted", while reaffirming her support for Palestinian civilians. Larsson declined an invitation to perform at the Eurovision Song Contest 2024, citing Israel's inclusion in the competition. In September 2026, she supported rapper Macklemore after he was removed from Ed Sheeran's tour for supporting Palestinians.

== Artistry and influences ==
Larsson is mainly a pop singer. She has experimented with electropop, house, and dance music. Additionally, she claims to be influenced by R&B. She has cited Beyoncé as her biggest musical influence, praising Beyoncé as a "brilliant role model" and her "number one idol". Larsson has noted how she models elements of Beyoncé's artistry into her performances, such as her use of an all-female band. Larsson's Swedish influences include Robyn, ABBA, Seinabo Sey, Sabina Ddumba, Avicii, and her sister Hanna Larsson, with her neo soul group Lennixx. Her additional international influences include Christina Aguilera, Rihanna, Green Day, and Lady Gaga. During her childhood, her mother's musical tastes also had a significant influence on her, as she grew up listening to artists such as Whitney Houston and Celine Dion. Upon the release of Midnight Sun, several outlets suggested that its aesthetic was a homage to the works of Lisa Frank.

== Discography ==
- 1 (2014)
- So Good (2017)
- Poster Girl (2021)
- Venus (2024)
- Midnight Sun (2025)

== Tours ==
=== Headlining ===
- So Good World Tour (2017–2018)
- Don't Worry Bout Me Tour (2019)
- Poster Girl Tour (2021–2022)
- Venus Tour (2024)
- Midnight Sun Tour (2025–2026)

=== Opening act ===
- Cher Lloyd – I Wish Tour (2013–2014)
- Beyoncé - Formation World Tour (2016)
- Clean Bandit – North American Tour (2017)
- Ed Sheeran – ÷ Tour (2019)
- Kygo – Kygo World Tour (2024)
- Tate McRae – Miss Possessive Tour (2025)

== Awards and nominations ==
Larsson is the recipient of numerous Swedish awards including one Bambi Award, two Electronic Dance Music Awards, four Grammis, four MTV European Music Awards and eight Rockbjörnen. Alongside those accolades, starting in 2016 as her breakthrough year, she has been nominated for numerous major music awards including nominations for four Brit Awards, one Hollywood Music in Media Award, one Latin American Music Award, two MTV Video Music Awards, and two Grammy Awards. Her first Grammy Award nomination came in November 2025 with her fifth studio album Midnight Sun.

== See also ==
- Popular music in Sweden
- List of artists who reached number one on the UK Singles Chart
- List of artists who reached number one on the US Dance Club Songs chart
