= Uncover (song) =

- The Remixes cover

Single by Zara Larsson

from the EP Introducing
- Released: 21 January 2013
- Length: 3:34
- Label: TEN; Epic
- Songwriters: Marcus Sepehrmanesh; Robert Habolin; Gavin Jones
- Producer: Robert Habolin

Zara Larsson singles chronology
"My Heart Will Go On" (2008)	"Uncover" (2013)	"She's Not Me" (2013)

Music video
- "Uncover" on YouTube

"Uncover" is a song by Swedish singer Zara Larsson. It was released on 21 January 2013 as the lead single from her debut extended play, Introducing (2013). It was written by Marcus Sepehrmanesh, Robert Habolin and Gavin Jones and produced by Habolin. The track topped the Sverigetopplistan, the official Swedish Singles Chart, on 22 February 2013, giving Larsson her first chart-topper. It also reached number one in Norway as well.

It also reached number one in Norway as well. Likewise, the single entered in new national territories for the first time, becoming Larsson's first international hit, and reached top ten, including in Belgium, Denmark, France, Luxembourg and Switzerland, top twenty in Slovakia and in a lesser extent, top thirty in Spanish. It being certified gold in France and Belgium, then platinum in Switzerland and Denmark.

In July 2013, "Uncover" was certified 6× Platinum in Sweden by Universal Music Sweden.

"Uncover" was re-recorded in 2014 and featured on Larsson's debut studio album, 1 (2014), the original version was released on her third and debut international extended play of the same name in 2015.

== Charts ==
=== Weekly charts ===
"Uncover" weekly charts
Chart (2013–15)	Peak position
Belgium (Ultratop 50 Flanders)	7
Belgium (Ultratop 50 Wallonia)	6
Czech Republic Airplay (ČNS IFPI)	16
Czech Republic Singles Digital (ČNS IFPI)	55
Denmark (Tracklisten)	3
France (SNEP)	5
Lebanon (The Official Lebanese Top 20)	12
Luxembourg Digital Songs (Billboard)	4
Norway (VG-lista)	1
Slovakia Airplay (ČNS IFPI)	11
Slovakia Singles Digital (ČNS IFPI)	57
Spain (Promusicae)	29
Sweden (Sverigetopplistan)	1
Switzerland (Schweizer Hitparade)	8

=== Year-end charts ===
"Uncover" year-end charts (2013)
Chart (2013)	Position
Denmark (Tracklisten)	20
Sweden (Sverigetopplistan)	6

"Uncover" year-end charts (2015)
Chart (2015)	Position
Belgium (Ultratop 50 Flanders)	19
Belgium (Ultratop 50 Wallonia)	22
France (SNEP)	32
Switzerland (Schweizer Hitparade)	27

== Certifications ==
"Uncover" certifications
Region	Certification	Certified units/sales
Belgium (BRMA)	Platinum	20,000^{‡}
Brazil (Pro-Música Brasil)	2× Platinum	120,000^{‡}
Canada (Music Canada)	Gold	40,000^{‡}
Denmark (IFPI Danmark)	Gold	15,000^{^}
France (SNEP)	Gold	75,000^{*}
Norway (IFPI Norway)	4× Platinum	240,000^{‡}
Sweden (GLF)	6× Platinum	240,000^{‡}
United Kingdom (BPI)	Silver	200,000^{‡}
United States (RIAA)	Gold	500,000^{‡}
Streaming
Denmark (IFPI Danmark)	3× Platinum	5,400,000^{†}
^{*} Sales figures based on certification alone.^{^} Shipments figures based on certification alone.^{‡} Sales+streaming figures based on certification alone.^{†} Streaming-only figures based on certification alone.

== Release history ==
"Uncover" release history
Region	Date	Format	Label
United States	2 February 2015	Adult contemporary radio; contemporary hit radio	TEN; Epic
