= Ruin My Life =

2018 single by Zara Larsson

Single by Zara Larsson

from the album Poster Girl
- Released: 18 October 2018
- Genre: Pop
- Length: 3:10
- Label: TEN; Epic; Sony
- Songwriters: Brittany Amaradio; Michael Pollack; Stefan Johnson; Jordan K. Johnson; Jamie Sanderson; Jackson Foote
- Producers: The Monsters and the Strangerz; Loote

Zara Larsson singles chronology
"Only You" (2017)	"Ruin My Life" (2018)	"Holding Out for You" (2019)

Music video
- "Ruin My Life" on YouTube

"Ruin My Life" is a song by Swedish singer and songwriter Zara Larsson. It was released on 18 October 2018 by TEN Music Group as the lead single from her third studio album Poster Girl (2021). The single peaked at number two in Sweden, number five in Ireland, and number nine in the United Kingdom. It is certified Gold or higher in ten countries.

== Composition ==
"Ruin My Life" is a pop song with elements of future bass, that has a drum track backed by an electric guitar and keyboard backed by synths. Paper described the song as "Larsson at her dreamiest with pensive piano breakdowns and cinematic sing-a-long choruses that roll into stadium-sized emotional crescendo after emotional crescendo. Larsson unearths a darker side of herself lyrically, diving into the dynamics of a toxic relationship. With a self-annihilating fatalism, Larsson's refrain of 'I want you to ruin my life/ruin my life/ruin my life' may seem naively reckless but, as the singer explains, taps into a more universal sentiment."

== Promotion ==
Larsson announced the release of the song on Instagram in September 2018, also sharing the cover art. Larsson later appeared on BBC Radio 1 to talk about the song with Greg James.

== Critical reception ==
Natasha Azarmi of Aftonbladet called the song a mix between the two moods of Larsson's previous album So Good, in that it is "quiet in the verses" and then picks up the pace for the chorus. Despite complimenting Larsson's "strong" voice and noting the song's "distinct beats" and "dreamy" sound, Azarmi said that the track "lacks enough sorrow and desperation" to be effective, and said that she hopes Larsson will show more "vulnerability" on her upcoming album.

== Charts ==
=== Weekly charts ===
Chart (2018–2019)	Peak position
Australia (ARIA)	32
Austria (Ö3 Austria Top 40)	51
Belgium (Ultratop 50 Flanders)	41
Belgium (Ultratop 50 Wallonia)	50
Canada Hot 100 (Billboard)	68
Canada All-Format (Billboard)	40
Canada CHR/Top 40 (Billboard)	25
Canada Hot AC (Billboard)	33
Croatia (HRT)	44
Czech Republic Singles Digital (ČNS IFPI)	53
Denmark (Tracklisten)	21
Estonia (IFPI)	40
Finland (Suomen virallinen lista)	20
Germany (GfK)	62
Greece International Digital Singles (IFPI)	34
Ireland (IRMA)	5
Israel (Media Forest TV Airplay)	9
Mexico Ingles Airplay (Billboard)	8
Netherlands (Single Top 100)	60
New Zealand (Recorded Music NZ)	28
Norway (VG-lista)	14
Portugal (AFP)	45
Romania (Airplay 100)	80
Scottish Singles Sales (Official Charts)	14
Slovakia Airplay (ČNS IFPI)	95
Slovakia Singles Digital (ČNS IFPI)	34
Sweden (Sverigetopplistan)	2
Switzerland (Schweizer Hitparade)	71
UK Singles (Official Charts)	9
US Billboard Hot 100	76
US Adult Pop Airplay (Billboard)	22
US Dance Airplay (Billboard)	34
US Pop Airplay (Billboard)	18

=== Year-end charts ===
Chart (2019)	Position
Sweden (Sverigetopplistan)	77

== Certifications ==
Region	Certification	Certified units/sales
Australia (ARIA)	Platinum	70,000^{‡}
Brazil (Pro-Música Brasil)	Platinum	40,000^{‡}
Canada (Music Canada)	2× Platinum	160,000^{‡}
Denmark (IFPI Danmark)	Platinum	90,000^{‡}
Hungary (MAHASZ)	Platinum	4,000^{‡}
New Zealand (RMNZ)	2× Platinum	60,000^{‡}
Norway (IFPI Norway)	2× Platinum	120,000^{‡}
Poland (ZPAV)	Gold	10,000^{‡}
United Kingdom (BPI)	Platinum	600,000^{‡}
United States (RIAA)	Platinum	1,000,000^{‡}
Streaming
Sweden (GLF)	3× Platinum	24,000,000^{†}
^{‡} Sales+streaming figures based on certification alone.^{†} Streaming-only figures based on certification alone.

== Release history ==
Region	Date	Format	Label	Ref.
Various	18 October 2018	Digital download	TEN; Epic	
United States	29 October 2018	Hot adult contemporary	Epic	
United States	30 October 2018	Contemporary hit radio	Epic	
