= Rooftop (song) =

Single by Zara Larsson

from the album 1
- Released: 15 September 2014
- Recorded: 2013
- Genre: R&B
- Length: 4:13
- Label: TEN; Epic
- Songwriters: Marcus "Mack" Sepehrmanesh; Rickard Göransson; Mathieu Jomphe; Nick Ruth
- Producers: Billboard; Nick Ruth; Marcus Sepehrmanesh

Zara Larsson singles chronology
"Carry You Home" (2014)	"Rooftop" (2014)	"Weak Heart" (2015)

Music video
- "Rooftop" on YouTube

"Rooftop" is a song by Swedish singer Zara Larsson. It was released on 15 September 2014 through TEN Music Group and Epic Records as the third single from her debut album, 1 (2014). The song also features on Larsson's third extended play, Uncover (2015). The song peaked at number six in Sweden, and was certified Platinum by the GLF.

== Composition ==
Scandipop describes the track as distinctive for its seamless blending of two genres. At its core, it is a classic R&B song, but it has been produced as an electro track—and done exceptionally well. The review notes that it essentially sounds like both a 2014 Robyn song and a 1998 Robyn song at the same time.

== Music video ==
A music video for "Rooftop" was released on 26 September 2014, directed by Måns Nyman.

== Track listing ==
Digital download
No.	Title	Length
1.	"Rooftop"	3:59
2.	"Rooftop" (Instrumental)	3:59

== Charts ==
=== Weekly charts ===
"Rooftop" weekly chart performance
Chart (2014)	Peak position
Sweden (Sverigetopplistan)	6

== Certifications ==
"Rooftop" certifications
Region	Certification	Certified units/sales
Denmark (IFPI Danmark)	Gold	45,000^{‡}
Sweden (GLF)	Platinum	40,000^{‡}
^{‡} Sales+streaming figures based on certification alone.

== Release history ==
"Rooftop" release history
Region	Date	Format	Label	Reference
Various	15 September 2014	Digital download; streaming	TEN; Epic; Sony	
