= Words (Alesso song) =

Single by Alesso featuring Zara Larsson
- Released: 22 April 2022
- Recorded: December 2021 – January 2022
- Genre: EDM-pop; house-pop
- Length: 2:22
- Label: 10:22PM; Astralwerks
- Songwriters: Alessandro Lindblad; Karen Ann Poole; Becky Hill; Zara Larsson
- Producer: Alesso

Alesso singles chronology
| "When I'm Gone" (2022) | "Words" (2022) | "In My Feelings" (2022) |

Zara Larsson singles chronology
| "Look What You've Done" (2021) | "Words" (2022) | "Can't Tame Her" (2023) |

Music video
- "Words" on YouTube

"Words" is a song by Swedish DJ and record producer Alesso, featuring vocals from Swedish singer Zara Larsson. It was released on 22 April 2022 by 10:22PM and Astralwerks. "Words" was written and produced by Alesso, with co-writing from Larsson, Karen Ann Poole and Becky Hill. Further production was provided by Hampus Lindvall, who produced Larsson's vocals. The song received mostly positive reviews from critics and reached number 5 in Sweden and the top 40 in Flanders, Croatia, Hungary, the Netherlands, Norway, Poland and the United Kingdom.

== Background and composition ==
"Words" is an EDM-pop and house-pop song, written by Alesso, Larsson, Karen Ann Poole and British singer Becky Hill. Alesso also produced the song with production of Larsson's vocals by Hampus Lindvall. It was recorded in both artists' home country of Sweden between December 2021 and January 2022. During an interview with Entertainment Tonight, Alesso and Larsson acknowledged that they had known each other for years but had never gotten around to collaborating previously, despite wanting to. Alesso explained his approach to approaching artists, "I always look for artists who can carry dance records". Prior to the release of "Words", or the confirmation of the collaboration, Alesso teased that his next single would feature a female vocalist via TikTok. The teasers featured coloured/artistic silhouettes, but fans immediately guessed that Larsson was going to be featured on the song. The "sultry" lyrics feature Larsson singing about the "words she can't tell a lover". V also noted the vulnerability in the lyrics.

"Words" was released on 22 April 2022, the same day as Piri & Tommy's song of the same name. Alesso's VIP Mix of the song was released on 27 May 2022. Both versions of the song have been played during Alesso's Las Vegas residency at Tao.

== Reception ==
=== Critics reviews ===
Drew Barkin from EDM Tunes praised Larsson's "glistening vocals" atop the "super catch" track, stating that their "only regret was that the song wasn't longer". Staff writing for Billboard included "Words" in their best dance songs of the week, praising it for helping to continue Alesso's "hot streak". Ellie Beeck of V called "Words" a "a radio-friendly dance song that is sure to be played at clubs everywhere this summer."

=== Commercial performance ===
"Words" peaked at number ten on the Billboard US Hot Dance/Electronic Songs chart, becoming his sixth top-ten single on the chart and on the US On the US Dance/Mix Show Airplay chart, it peaked at number four, Alesso's ninth top-five single on the chart.

== Music video ==
The concept of the music video was a clash of worlds with imagery of Greek mythology. Alesso called the video a collaboration and mix of Alesso's world (rave) and Larsson's fashion and beauty. It was directed by Jason Lester and featured an ensemble cast.

== Track listing ==
Digital download/streaming

1. "Words" (featuring Zara Larsson) – 2:22

Digital download/streaming – Alesso VIP Mix

1. "Words" (featuring Zara Larsson; Alesso VIP Mix) – 5:28

== Personnel and credits ==
=== Song credits ===
- Alesso – producer, mixer, programmer, engineer
- Randy Merrill – mastering engineer, engineer
- Zara Larsson – lead vocals
- Hampus Lindvall – vocal producer

=== Music video credits ===
Adapted from YouTube.

- Gus Bendinelli – cinematographer, colorist
- Montana Bertoletti – lead man
- Mitchell Brinker – BBG
- Laura Burhenn – producer (Note: The production company for "Words" was 'Our Secret Handshake'.)
- Luis Cano – stylist (for Alesso)
- Nikki Carmela – cast member
- Karim Dakkon – key grip
- Andy DeLuca – projection graphic designer
- Eddie Diaz – BTS (for Alesso)
- Erikx DiSantis – line producer, cast member
- Chase DuBose – gaffer
- Jake Dugger – 2nd AC, loader
- Miguel Escalona – swing
- David Goold – BBE
- Ava Jones – production designer
- Loies Kim – video commissioner
- A Klass – cast member
- Jason Lester – director, editor
- Brianna Liebling – production manager
- Maranda – hair stylist (for Zara Larsson)
- James Marin – steadicam
- Eric Moore – set dresser
- Tyeri Morrison – cast member
- Joe Mortimer – creative director
- Grace Pae – make-up artist (for Zara Larsson)
- Markelle Pike – cast member
- Nikki Pittam – hair stylist (for Alesso)
- Katie Qian – stylist (for Zara Larsson)
- Jorge Ramos – cast member
- Marlaine Reiner – groomer (for Alesso)
- Brian Robins – cast member
- Jordan Sakai – 1st AC
- Matthew Sanchez – associate director
- Grant Spanier – BTS
- Drew Wall – set dresser
- Wilder Yari – cast member

== Charts ==
=== Weekly charts ===
Weekly chart performance for "Words"
| Chart (2022–2023) | Peak position |
|---|---|
| Australia Hitseekers (ARIA) | 19 |
| Belgium (Ultratop 50 Flanders) | 11 |
| CIS Airplay (TopHit) | 106 |
| Croatia International Airplay (HRT) | 24 |
| Czech Republic Airplay (ČNS IFPI) | 20 |
| Estonia Airplay (TopHit) | 132 |
| Finnish Airplay (Radiosoittolista) | 10 |
| Hungary (Single Top 40) | 18 |
| Ireland (IRMA) | 26 |
| Lithuania (AGATA) | 38 |
| Netherlands (Dutch Top 40) | 2 |
| Netherlands (Single Top 100) | 6 |
| New Zealand Hot Singles (RMNZ) | 16 |
| Norway (VG-lista) | 15 |
| Poland Airplay (ZPAV) | 6 |
| Poland (Polish Streaming Top 100) | 68 |
| Slovakia Airplay (ČNS IFPI) | 11 |
| Slovakia Singles Digital (ČNS IFPI) | 54 |
| Sweden (Sverigetopplistan) | 5 |
| UK Singles (Official Charts) | 36 |
| UK Dance (Official Charts) | 13 |
| US Dance Airplay (Billboard) | 4 |
| US Hot Dance/Electronic Songs (Billboard) | 10 |

=== Monthly charts ===
Monthly chart performance for "Words"
| Chart (2022) | Peak position |
|---|---|
| Czech Republic (Rádio – Top 100) | 49 |
| Slovakia (Rádio – Top 100) | 13 |
| Slovakia (Singles Digitál – Top 100) | 54 |

=== Year-end charts ===
2022 year-end chart performance for "Words"
| Chart (2022) | Position |
|---|---|
| Belgium (Ultratop 50 Flanders) | 42 |
| Netherlands (Dutch Top 40) | 10 |
| Netherlands (Single Top 100) | 35 |
| Poland (ZPAV) | 52 |
| Sweden (Sverigetopplistan) | 14 |
| US Hot Dance/Electronic Songs (Billboard) | 34 |

== Certifications ==
Certifications for "Words"
| Region | Certification | Certified units/sales |
|---|---|---|
| Belgium (BRMA) | Gold | 20,000^{‡} |
| Brazil (Pro-Música Brasil) | 2× Platinum | 80,000^{‡} |
| Denmark (IFPI Danmark) | Platinum | 90,000^{‡} |
| France (SNEP) | Gold | 100,000^{‡} |
| Italy (FIMI) | Gold | 50,000^{‡} |
| New Zealand (RMNZ) | Platinum | 30,000^{‡} |
| Poland (ZPAV) | 2× Platinum | 100,000^{‡} |
| Spain (Promusicae) | Gold | 30,000^{‡} |
| United Kingdom (BPI) | Platinum | 600,000^{‡} |
| United States (RIAA) | Gold | 500,000^{‡} |
^{‡} Sales+streaming figures based on certification alone.

== Release history ==
Release dates and formats for "Words"
| Region | Date | Format | Version | Label | Ref. |
|---|---|---|---|---|---|
| Various | 22 April 2022 | Digital download; streaming | Original | 10:22PM; Astralwerks | |
| Various | 27 May 2022 | Digital download; streaming | Alesso VIP Mix | 10:22PM; Astralwerks | |
