= Don't Worry Bout Me (Zara Larsson song) =

2019 single by Zara Larsson

Single by Zara Larsson
- Released: 28 March 2019
- Genre: Dance-pop
- Length: 3:28
- Label: TEN; Epic
- Songwriters: Zara Larsson; Tove Nilsson; Rami Yacoub; Linnea Södahl; Whitney Phillips; Jakob Jerlström; Ludvig Söderberg
- Producer: The Struts

Zara Larsson singles chronology
"Holding Out for You" (2019)	"Don't Worry Bout Me" (2019)	"Now You're Gone" (2019)

Music video
- "Don't Worry Bout Me" on YouTube

"Don't Worry Bout Me" is a song by Swedish singer Zara Larsson. It was released by TEN Music Group and Epic Records on 28 March 2019. Larsson wrote "Don't Worry Bout Me" with Tove Lo, Rami Yacoub, Linnea Södahl, Whitney Phillips, and The Struts, who also produced the song. It is a dance-pop track with dancehall-infused house production. The song appears as a bonus track on the Japanese CD edition of Larsson's third studio album, Poster Girl. The song reached the top 10 in Sweden and Spain.

== Critical reception ==
Robin Murray of Clash magazine described the track as "electrifying" and "a tour de force of pop energy, backed by a killer chorus and one of Zara's most emphatic vocal performances to date." The Line of Best Fit's Cerys Kenneally called it "a sleek summer number".

== Charts ==
Chart (2019)	Peak position
Belgium (Ultratip Bubbling Under Wallonia)	14
Ireland (IRMA)	36
Lithuania (AGATA)	66
New Zealand Hot Singles (RMNZ)	10
Norway (VG-lista)	26
Scottish Singles Sales (Official Charts)	34
Spain (PROMUSICAE)	5
Sweden (Sverigetopplistan)	7
UK Singles (Official Charts)	34

== Certifications ==
Region	Certification	Certified units/sales
Brazil (Pro-Música Brasil)	Gold	30,000^{‡}
Norway (IFPI Norway)	Gold	30,000^{‡}
United Kingdom (BPI)	Silver	200,000^{‡}
Streaming
Sweden (GLF)	Platinum	8,000,000^{†}
^{‡} Sales+streaming figures based on certification alone.^{†} Streaming-only figures based on certification alone.
