= Only You (Zara Larsson song) =

- Remixes cover

Single by Zara Larsson

from the album So Good
- Released: 11 August 2017
- Studio: Basecamp (Stockholm, Sweden)
- Genre: Pop; reggae
- Length: 3:42
- Label: TEN; Epic
- Songwriters: Herbert Joakim Berg; Michel Flygare; Tobias Jimson; Petra Marklund; Markus Sepehrmanesh
- Producers: Astma & Rocwell; Markus Sepehrmanesh

Zara Larsson singles chronology
"Don't Let Me Be Yours" (2017)	"Only You" (2017)	"Ruin My Life" (2018)

Audio video
- "Only You" on YouTube

"Only You" is a song by Swedish singer Zara Larsson. It was released on 11 August 2017 through TEN Music Group and Epic Records, as the seventh and final single from her second studio album So Good (2017). Lyrically, the song is about sexual fulfillment and masturbation. Alternate versions of the single feature Nena and Olivier Dion.

== Composition ==
"Only You" is a midtempo pop and "quasi-reggae" song with a length of three minutes and forty two seconds. The song is in the key of F minor, and moves at a tempo of 165 beats per minute in a 4/4 time signature. The song contains "tongue-in-cheek" lyrics about sexual fulfillment as well as masturbation.

== Critical reception ==
Jonathan Currinn of Outlet Magazine praised the song, calling it a "total upgrade from the past two songs" on the album. NME compared "Only You" to the works of Rihanna.

== Track listing ==
Digital download – "Only You" + Remixes

1. "Only You" – 3:42
2. "Only You" (orchestral version) – 3:47
3. "Only You" (Hitimpulse remix) – 3:39
4. "Only You" (Kream remix) – 3:27

Digital download – Germany, Austria and Switzerland

1. "Only You" (featuring Nena) – 3:47

Digital download – France and Canada

1. "Only You" (featuring Olivier Dion) – 3:42

== Personnel ==
Credits were adapted from the liner notes of So Good and Tidal.

Recording locations

- Basecamp Studios; Stockholm, Sweden

Personnel

- Zara Larsson – vocals
- Michael Richard Flygare – composition
- Petra Marklund – composition
- Tobias "Astma" Jimson – composition, production, recording engineer
- Joakim Berg – composition, guitar
- MACK – composition, production
- Phil Tan – mixing engineer
- Bill Zimmerman – mixing engineer
- Emerson Mancini – mastering engineer
- Maria Hazell – backing vocals

== Charts ==
=== Weekly charts ===
Chart (2017)	Peak position
Norway (VG-lista)	39
Sweden (Sverigetopplistan)	5

=== Year-end charts ===
Chart (2017)	Position
Sweden (Sverigetopplistan)	49

== Certifications ==
Region	Certification	Certified units/sales
Norway (IFPI Norway)	Platinum	60,000^{‡}
^{‡} Sales+streaming figures based on certification alone.

== Release history ==
List of release dates
Region	Date	Format	Version	Label	Ref.
Various	11 August 2017	Digital download; streaming	Remix	TEN; Sony	
Germany	6 October 2017	Digital download; streaming	Duet Nena	TEN; Sony	
Canada	22 December 2017	Digital download; streaming	Duet Olivier Dion	TEN; Sony	
France	22 December 2017		Duet Olivier Dion		
