= All the Time (Zara Larsson song) =

Single by Zara Larsson
- Released: 21 June 2019
- Genre: Synth-pop
- Length: 3:48
- Label: TEN; Epic
- Songwriters: Zara Larsson; Linus Wiklund; Jonnali Parmenius; Ilsey Juber
- Producer: Lotus IV

Zara Larsson singles chronology
"A Brand New Day" (2019)	"All the Time" (2019)	"Invisible" (2019)

Music video
- "All the Time" on YouTube

"All the Time" is a song by Swedish singer Zara Larsson. It was released through TEN Music Group and Epic Records on 21 June 2019. Described as a synth-pop track, it was co-written by Larsson with Noonie Bao, Ilsey Juber, Linus Wiklund and produced by the latter. The song appears as a bonus track on the Japanese CD edition of Larsson's third studio album, Poster Girl.

== Composition ==
"All the Time" is a synth-pop song. Larsson co-wrote it with Noonie Bao, Ilsey Juber, Linus Wiklund and the latter produced the track.

== Promotion ==
Larsson performed the song during her setlist at Radio 1's Big Weekend 2019 on Sunday 26 May. She announced the song's release on social media on 14 June, the same day as her collaboration with South Korean boy band BTS, "A Brand New Day", was released. The song was later included in the deluxe edition of Larsson's third studio album, Poster Girl.

Don Diablo released a remix of "All the Time" on 5 July 2019. The track was released both on Don Diablo and Zara Larsson's YouTube channel.

== Music video ==
A music video for "All the Time" was released to promote the single. It features three showgirl characters portrayed by Larsson dancing against a neon backdrop and pink metallic streamers.

== Charts ==
Weekly chart performance
Chart (2019)	Peak position
Canada CHR/Top 40 (Billboard)	38
Ireland (IRMA)	57
Latvia (EHR)	3
Netherlands (Single Tip)	24
New Zealand Hot Singles (RMNZ)	14
Scottish Singles Sales (Official Charts)	36
Sweden (Sverigetopplistan)	19
UK Singles (Official Charts)	58
US Adult Pop Airplay (Billboard)	37
US Dance Airplay (Billboard)	2
US Pop Airplay (Billboard)	25
Venezuela Top Anglo (Record Report)	41

== Certifications ==
Region	Certification	Certified units/sales
Brazil (Pro-Música Brasil)	Gold	20,000^{‡}
Denmark (IFPI Danmark)	Gold	45,000^{‡}
New Zealand (RMNZ)	Gold	15,000^{‡}
Norway (IFPI Norway)	Platinum	60,000^{‡}
United Kingdom (BPI)	Silver	200,000^{‡}
United States (RIAA)	Gold	500,000^{‡}
Streaming
Sweden (GLF)	Platinum	8,000,000^{†}
^{‡} Sales+streaming figures based on certification alone.^{†} Streaming-only figures based on certification alone.

== Release history ==
Region	Date	Format	Label	Ref.
Various	21 June 2019	Digital download; streaming	TEN; Epic	
United States	25 June 2019	Contemporary hit radio	Epic	
