= Carry You Home (Zara Larsson song) =

Single by Zara Larsson

from the album 1
- Released: 12 May 2014
- Length: 4:13
- Label: TEN
- Songwriter: Elof Loelv
- Producer: Elof Loelv

Zara Larsson singles chronology
"Bad Boys" (2013)	"Carry You Home" (2014)	"Rooftop" (2014)

Music video
- "Carry You Home" on YouTube

"Carry You Home" is a song by Swedish singer Zara Larsson. It was released on 12 May 2014 through TEN Music Group in Sweden as the second single from her debut album, 1 (2014). Written and produced by Elof Loelv, the single was released on 22 August internationally, and its music video was unveiled a day later. Commercially, "Carry You Home" reached a peak of number three in Sweden and was later certified 2× Platinum.

== Composition and live performance ==
"Carry You Home" runs for 4 minutes and 23 seconds; Elof Loelv wrote and produced the track. On 24 September 2015, Larsson performed the song on ElectriCity's Silent Bus Sessions, along with the track "Better You".

== Music video and chart performance ==
The music video for "Carry You Home" was released on 13 May 2014. In Sweden, the song debuted at number five, reaching its peak of number three four weeks later. The track remained in the top 50 for 22 weeks. It was certicified 2× Platinum in Sweden.

== Track listing ==
Digital download

1. "Carry You Home" – 4:13
2. "Carry You Home" (instrumental) – 4:13

== Charts ==
=== Weekly charts ===
Weekly chart performance
Chart (2014–15)	Peak position
Czech Republic Singles Digital (ČNS IFPI)	56
Slovakia Singles Digital (ČNS IFPI)	58
Sweden (Sverigetopplistan)	3

=== Year-end charts ===
Year-end chart performance
Chart (2014)	Position
Sweden (Sverigetopplistan)	48

== Certifications ==
Certifications and sales
Region	Certification	Certified units/sales
Sweden (GLF)	2× Platinum	80,000^{‡}
^{‡} Sales+streaming figures based on certification alone.

== Release history ==
Release history
Region	Date	Format(s)	Label	Ref.
Sweden	12 May 2014	Digital download; streaming	TEN	
Various	22 August 2014	Digital download; streaming	TEN	
