= Midnight Sun: Girls Trip =

Remix album by Zara Larsson
- Released: 1 May 2026
- Length: 34:00
- Languages: English; Mandarin Chinese; Spanish; Swedish
- Labels: Sommer House; Epic
- Producers: ASAP P on the Boards; Bambii; Count Baldor; Helena Gao; Margo XS; MNEK; Noisecastle III; PinkPantheress; Jon Shave; Zhone

Zara Larsson chronology
Midnight Sun (2025)	Midnight Sun: Girls Trip (2026)

Midnight Sun: Girls Trip (also referred to as simply Girls Trip) is the first remix album (Note: Girls Trip has also been promoted as a deluxe edition of Midnight Sun; however, some media outlets regarded it as a remix album.) by Swedish singer and songwriter Zara Larsson. It was released on 1 May 2026, through Sommer House and Epic Records. It contains remixed versions of all tracks from Midnight Sun (2025) with guest appearances from an all-female line-up of artists: PinkPantheress, Kehlani, JT, Margo XS, Emilia, Eli, Shakira, Tyla, Madison Beer, Bambii, Malibu, Helena Gao and Robyn, along with the original tracks.

== Background and promotion ==
Prior to the release of her fifth studio album, Midnight Sun (2025), Larsson had limited presence on the US Billboard Hot 100. However, following opening for Tate McRae's Miss Possessive Tour and embarking on the Midnight Sun Tour, she gained traction online and increased attention to her newer material. Several of her songs charted on the listing; "Midnight Sun" peaked at number 13, while "Stateside", a collaboration with British singer PinkPantheress from her own remix album Fancy Some More?, reached the top ten. Her 2015 single "Lush Life" also re-entered the chart and peaked at number 35.

After the commercial success of Midnight Sun, Larsson began teasing a deluxe edition in April 2026, titled Girls Trip. She also collaborated with South African singer Tyla on "She Did It Again" and performed "Midnight Sun" during PinkPantheress' set at Coachella. On 19 April, Larsson confirmed its title and cover artwork. Three days later, she revealed the all female guest list featured in Girls Trip, such as Robyn, PinkPantheress, Shakira, Kehlani, Madison Beer, and among others. Larsson attended iHeartRadio's listening party on 30 April, in support of the album. She previewed Girls Trip, which her fans could hear part of the album prior to its release. The album is composed of two discs, which include original track list of Midnight Sun.

The "Eurosummer" remix with Shakira was released as the first single from the record on 7 June 2026 and was scheduled to have an official music video, however, the plans were scrapped due to dissatisfaction with the visual. On 20 September 2026, the "Midnight Sun" remix with PinkPantheress was serviced to radio as the second single from Midnight Sun: Girls Trip.

== Critical reception ==
Professional ratings
Review scores
Source	Rating
Gaffa	5/6 stars
NME	4.5/5 stars
Pitchfork	7.4/10

Some outlets compared the way Larsson released Girls Trip to how British singers Charli XCX and PinkPantheress have released their remix albums. Allie Gregory from Exclaim! praised the remix album, saying it "expands and improves upon its source material" and calling the title track, "Blue Moon" and "Eurosummer" remixes as standouts. Pitchfork praised the title track's remix and named it Best New Track upon its release. The Fader highlighted the "Saturn's Return" remix, stating: "The remix has a moving, existential dreaminess, evoking Madonna's Ray of Light's psychedelic sunniness."

== Track listing ==
Midnight Sun: Girls Trip disc 1 track listing
No.	Title	Writer(s)	Producer(s)	Length
1.	"Midnight Sun" (with PinkPantheress)	Zara Larsson; Uzoechi Emenike; Helena Gao; Victoria Walker; Margo Wildman	PinkPantheress; Gao; Margo XS; MNEK^{[p]}; Count Baldor; Troy Taylor^{[v]}	2:51
2.	"Blue Moon" (with Kehlani)	Larsson; Benny; Emenike; Gao; Kevin Hickey; Kehlani Parrish; Wildman	Margo XS; MNEK; Zhone; Akeel Henry^{[c]}	3:12
3.	"Pretty Ugly" (with JT and Margo XS)	Larsson; Emenike; Gao; Jatavia Johnson; Wildman	Margo XS; MNEK	2:28
4.	"Girl's Girl" (with Emilia)	Larsson; Patricio Contreras; Emenike; Aminata Kabba; Tyler Christian Lewis; Mauro Ezequiel Lombardo; Emilia Mernes; Richard Zastenker	ASAP P on the Boards; MNEK; InKid^{[c]}; Zastenker^{[v]}	3:15
5.	"Crush" (with Eli)	Larsson; Ethan Ayer; Emenike; Gao; Hickey; Eli Miller; Wildman	Margo XS; Zhone; MNEK; Eli^{[a]}; Mike Wise^{[a]}	3:21
6.	"Eurosummer" (with Shakira)	Larsson; Scott Bruzenak; Emenike; Gao; Hickey; Shakira; Theron Thomas; Mary Weitz; Wildman	Margo XS; Zhone; MNEK; Noisecastle III	2:50
7.	"Hot & Sexy" (with Tyla)	Larsson; Tyla Seethal; Bibi Bourelly; Emenike; Dougie F; Gao; Hickey; Ariowa Irosogie; Imani Lewis; Corey Marlon Lindsay-Keay; Tiffany Pollard; Jon Shave; Wildman	Margo XS; Zhone; Shave; MNEK; Taylor^{[v]}	3:26
8.	"The Ambition" (with Madison Beer and Bambii)	Larsson; Madison Beer; Emenike; Gao; Lucy Healey; Wildman	Margo XS; MNEK; Bambii; Taylor^{[v]}	3:15
9.	"Saturn's Return" (with Malibu and Helena Gao)	Larsson; Barbara Braccini; Emenike; Gao; Hickey; Wildman	Margo XS; MNEK; Zhone; Taylor^{[v]}; Malibu^{[r]}	6:17
10.	"Puss Puss" (with Robyn)	Larsson; Robin Carlsson; Emenike; Gao; Wildman; Michel Zitron	Margo XS; MNEK^{[p]}; Oscar Scheller^{[c]}; Zitron^{[v]}	3:05
Total length:				34:00

=== Notes ===
- ^{^[p]} indicates a primary and vocal producer.
- ^{^[c]} indicates a co-producer.
- ^{^[v]} indicates a vocal producer.
- ^{^[a]} indicates an additional producer.
- ^{^[r]} indicates a remixer.
- All tracks are noted as "Girls Trip".
- "Midnight Sun" contains a sample of "Gold Dust" (2008) by DJ Fresh.
- "Blue Moon" contains a sample of "I Like It" (1982) by DeBarge.
- The standard edition Midnight Sun appear under a second disc on digital platforms, for physical editions they instead appear prior to the Girls Trip tracks.

== Personnel ==
Credits are adapted from Tidal.

- Zara Larsson – lead vocals, background vocals
- Kaelen Russell – engineering
- Tom Norris – mixing
- Victor Verpillat – mixing assistance
- Nathan Dantzler – mastering
- Harrison Tate – mastering assistance
- PinkPantheress – lead vocals (track 1)
- Joel Quatrocchi – engineering assistance (1, 2, 5, 6, 9)
- Juanita Manrique – engineering assistance (1, 8)
- Helena Gao – background vocals (2, 3, 7), lead vocals (9)
- Kehlani – lead vocals (2)
- Jenna Felsenthal – recording (2)
- Margo XS – background vocals (3, 7)
- MNEK – background vocals (3, 7)
- JT – lead vocals (3)
- Emilia – lead vocals (4)
- Zhone – drums, keyboards, programming (5–7, 9)
- Eli – lead vocals, background vocals (5)
- Alexx Nielsen – engineering assistance (5)
- Daniel Cullen – engineering assistance (5)
- Matt Teden – engineering assistance (6, 10)
- Shakira – lead vocals (6)
- Tyla – lead vocals (7)
- Tiffany Pollard – background vocals (7)
- Oscar Cornejo – recording, vocal engineering (7)
- Kristina Fisk – engineering assistance (8, 10)
- Harry Daniels – background vocals (8)
- Madison Beer – lead vocals (8)
- Bambii – lead vocals (8)
- Robyn – lead vocals (10)

== Charts ==
Chart performance
Chart (2026)	Peak position
Australian Albums (ARIA)	14
Danish Albums (Hitlisten)	22
Norwegian Albums (IFPI Norge)	14
Swedish Albums (Sverigetopplistan)	5

== Release history ==
List of release dates and formats
Region	Date	Format(s)	Label(s)	Ref.
Various	1 May 2026	digital download; streaming	Sommer House; Epic	
Various	4 September 2026	CD; LP	Sommer House; Epic	
