= Tom Norris (music producer) =

American mix engineer (born 1991)

- Also known as: getyoursnackon
- Born: Thomas Norris; July 11, 1991 (age 35); Falmouth, Massachusetts, United States
- Origin: Los Angeles, California, United States
- Genres: Dance; Pop; Hip hop
- Occupations: Record producer; recording engineer; mixing engineer; mastering engineer; songwriter
- Instruments: Ableton Live; FL Studio; Guitar; keyboards; piano
- Years active: 2010–present
- Website: getyoursnackon.com

Tom Norris (born July 15, 1991) is an American Grammy Award and Latin Grammy Award-winning mix engineer, producer, sound designer, mastering engineer, and songwriter from Los Angeles, California. Norris is best known for his mixing and production work for several prominent artists in the music industry, including Lady Gaga, BTS, The Weeknd, Mariah Carey, Charli xcx, Tate McRae, Demi Lovato, Kesha, Tinashe, Skrillex, Fred again.., Tiësto, Zedd, Meghan Trainor, Luis Fonsi, Zara Larsson, Illenium, and the duo Ca7riel and Paco Amoroso. His soundtrack work includes F1 the Album, the soundtrack to the film F1, and Grand Theft Auto VI: The Album.

== Awards and nominations ==
=== Grammy Awards ===
Year	Nominee / work	Award	Result	Ref.
2019	"The Middle" (as mixer)	Record of the Year	Nominated	
2019	"The Middle" (as mixer)	Best Pop Duo/Group Performance	Nominated	
2020	"Midnight Hour" (as mixer)	Best Dance Recording	Nominated	
2021	Chromatica (as mixer)	Best Pop Vocal Album	Nominated	
2021	"Rain on Me" (as mixer)	Best Pop Duo/Group Performance	Won	
2022	Fallen Embers (as mixer)	Best Dance/Electronic Album	Nominated	
2022	Shockwave (as mixer)	Best Dance/Electronic Album	Nominated	
2023	Surrender (as immersive mixer)	Best Dance/Electronic Album	Nominated	
2025	Brat (as mixer)	Album of the Year	Nominated	
2025	Brat (as mixer)	Best Dance/Electronic Album	Won	
2025	"Von Dutch" (as mixer)	Best Dance Pop Recording	Won	
2026	"Victory Lap" (as mixer)	Best Dance/Electronic Recording	Nominated	
2026	"Midnight Sun" (as mixer)	Best Dance Pop Recording	Nominated	
2026	F1® the Album (as co-producer, mixer)	Best Compilation Soundtrack For Visual Media	Nominated	
2026	Bogotá (deluxe) (as mixer)	Best Latin Pop Album	Nominated	

=== iHeartRadio Music Awards ===
Year	Nominee / work	Award	Result	Ref.
2019	The Middle (as mixer)	Song of the Year	Won	

=== Billboard Music Awards ===
Year	Nominee / work	Award	Result	Ref.
2019	The Middle (as mixer)	Top Dance/Electronic Song	Won	

== Select Album Discography ==
Year	Album	Artists	Credit
2026	Reborn	nate sib	Mixer, Dolby Atmos Mixer
2026	BARAJA BENDITA	Becky G	Mixer, Dolby Atmos Mixer
2026	9 months & 50 hours	Fred again.., LATIN MAFIA	Mixer
2026	SOMA	Skrillex	Mixer
2026	Official FIFA World Cup 2026™ Album	FIFA Sound	Mixer
2026	NATURE IS HEALING	horsegiirL	Mixer, Dolby Atmos Mixer
2026	'PUREFLOW', Pt. 1	LE SSERAFIM	Mixer
2026	Midnight Sun: Girls Trip	Zara Larsson	Mixer, Dolby Atmos Mixer
2026	It's Not That Deep (Unless You Want It To Be)	Demi Lovato	Mixer, Dolby Atmos Mixer
2026	Toy With Me	Meghan Trainor	Mixer, Dolby Atmos Mixer
2026	Ö	Fcukers	Mixer
2026	Confessions: An Unexpected Turn of Events	Mimi Webb	Mixer, Dolby Atmos Mixer
2026	Wuthering Heights	Charli xcx	Mixer, Dolby Atmos Mixer
2026	ODYSSEY	ILLENIUM	Mixer, Dolby Atmos Mixer
2026	Salt & Silence	Said The Sky	Mixer, Dolby Atmos Mixer
2025	So Close To What	Tate McRae	Mixer, Dolby Atmos Mixer
2025	HOT	LE SSERAFIM	Mixer, Dolby Atmos Mixer
2025	UNCUT GEM	KiiiKiii	Mixer, Dolby Atmos Mixer
2025	NAVE DRAGÓN	Lola Indigo	Mixer, Dolby Atmos Mixer
2025	Aura Park	Dabin	Mixer, Dolby Atmos Mixer
2025	CUARTO AZUL	Aitana	Mixer, Dolby Atmos Mixer
2025	Ya Es Mañana	Morat	Mixer, Dolby Atmos Mixer
2025	Milagro	Sebastian Yatra	Mixer, Dolby Atmos Mixer
2025	AFTERS	Adam Lambert	Mixer, Dolby Atmos Mixer
2025	teaching a robot to love	Amelia Moore	Mixer, Dolby Atmos Mixer
2025	F1 The Album	Apple Studios	Co-producer, Mixer, Dolby Atmos Mixer, Programming
2025	DOPAMINE	Lil Tecca	Mixer, Dolby Atmos Mixer
2025	DESIRE : UNLEASH	ENHYPEN	Mixer, Dolby Atmos Mixer
2025	Midnight Sun	Zara Larsson	Mixer, Dolby Atmos Mixer
2025	MOJA1TA	Lola Indigo	Mixer, Dolby Atmos Mixer
2025	.	Kesha	Mixer, Dolby Atmos Mixer
2025	The Roots	Marshmello	Mixer
2025	THE WHEEL	I See Stars	Mixer, Dolby Atmos Mixer
2025	Confessions	Mimi Webb	Mixer, Dolby Atmos Mixer
2025	GHOST WORLD	Alison Wonderland	Mixer
2025	Closer To The Sun	Said The Sky	Mixer, Dolby Atmos Mixer
2025	Pueblo Salvaje II	Manuel Carrasco	Mixer
2024	un mechón de pelo	TINI	Mixer, Dolby Atmos Mixer
2024	El Viaje	Luis Fonsi	Mixer, Dolby Atmos Mixer
2024	Timeless	Meghan Trainor	Mixer, Dolby Atmos Mixer
2024	brat	Charli xcx	Mixer, Dolby Atmos Mixer
2024	brat and it's completely different but also still brat	Charli xcx	Mixer, Dolby Atmos Mixer
2024	In Waves	Jamie xx	Mixer
2024	GOTTI A	Tiago PZK	Mixer
2024	ILLENIUM	ILLENIUM	Mixer, Dolby Atmos Mixer
2024	CHILDSTAR	Danna Paola	Mixer, Dolby Atmos Mixer
2024	PULSE	Gryffin	Mixer, Dolby Atmos Mixer
2024	.mp3	Emilia	Mixer, Dolby Atmos Mixer
2024	PLAN A	Lil Tecca	Mixer, Dolby Atmos Mixer
2024	Arcane (League of Legends Season 2 Soundtrack)	Netflix / Riot Games	Mixer, Dolby Atmos Mixer
2023	Diamonds & Dancefloors	Ava Max	Mixer, Dolby Atmos Mixer
2023	Cupido	TINI	Mixer
2023	Don't Get Too Close	Skrillex	Mixer, Dolby Atmos Mixer
2023	10,000 Gecs	100 Gecs	Mixer
2023	Drive	Tiësto	Mixer, Dolby Atmos Mixer
2023	TEC	Lil Tecca	Mixer, Dolby Atmos Mixer
2023	alpha	Aitana	Mixer, Dolby Atmos Mixer
2023	SUCCUBUS	Cobrah	Mixer
2023	MILAMORES	Sofía Reyes	Mixer, Dolby Atmos Mixer
2022	Sentiment	Said The Sky	Mixer
2022	To Believe	Louis The Child	Mixer
2022	La Carta	Greeicy	Mixer
2022	Ley De Gravedad	Luis Fonsi	Mixer, Dolby Atmos Mixer
2022	Malibu	Cali Y El Dandee	Mixer, Dolby Atmos Mixer
2022	Shape & Form	Two Feet	Mixer
2022	VIAJANTE	Fonseca	Mixer, Dolby Atmos Mixer
2022	Loner	Alison Wonderland	Mixer
2022	DRMVRSE	NGHTMRE	Mixer
2022	Thrive	Slander	Mixer
2022	The Loneliest Time	Carly Rae Jepsen	Mixer
2022	Alive	Gryffin	Mixer
2022	SI AYER FUERA HOY	Morat	Mixer, Dolby Atmos Mixer
2021	Surrender	RÜFÜS DU SOL	Dolby Atmos Mixer
2021	Euphoria	Louis The Child, Livingston	Mixer
2021	Dawn of Chromatica	Lady Gaga	Mixer
2021	Shockwave	Marshmello	Mixer
2021	Desamorfosis	Thalía	Mixer
2021	Mortal Kombat (Original Motion Picture Soundtrack)	Benjamin Wallfisch	Mixer, mastering
2021	Max Maco Is Dead Right?	Two Feet	Mixer
2021	¿A Dónde Vamos?	Morat	Mixer
2021	Better Mistakes	Bebe Rexha	Mixer
2021	Nurture	Porter Robinson	Mixer
2021	Fallen Embers	ILLENIUM	Mixer, Dolby Atmos Mixer
2020	Cyberpunk 2077 (Original Soundtrack)	CD Projekt	Mixer
2020	11 Razones	Aitana	Mixer
2020	Chromatica	Lady Gaga	Mixer
2020	Miss Anthropocene	Grimes	Mixer
2020	zer0	Krewella	Mixer
2019	Gravity	Gryffin	Mixer
2019	Ascend	ILLENIUM	Mixer, mastering
2019	No. 6 Collaborations	Ed Sheeran	Mixer
2019	Turn Off The Lights EP	Dog Blood	Mixer, engineer
2019	Bad Mode	Hikaru Utada, Skrillex	Co-producer, engineer, mixer
2018	My Dear Melancholy,	The Weeknd	Mixer
2018	Bright: The Album	Netflix	Mixer
2018	Caution	Mariah Carey	Mixer
2010	Suddenly Yours	Allstar Weekend	Co-writer, co-producer
