= You Love Who You Love =

Single by Zara Larsson

from the album Venus
- Released: 19 January 2024
- Genre: Pop; dance pop
- Length: 3:04
- Label: Sommer House; Epic
- Songwriters: Zara Larsson; Uzoechi Emenike; Karl Ivert; Kian Sang
- Producer: MTHR

Zara Larsson singles chronology
"Silent Night" (2023)	"You Love Who You Love" (2024)	"Pretty Ugly" (2025)

Music video
- "You Love Who You Love" on YouTube

"You Love Who You Love" is a song by Swedish singer and songwriter Zara Larsson. It was released as the fourth and final single from her fourth studio album, Venus (2024), on 19 January 2024 through Sommer House and Epic Records.

In a statement, Larsson said "We started writing over Pride, and began talking about how amazing it is that anyone can love anyone – but that doesn't mean you always should. We've all had that friend, or been that friend, who keeps going back to someone who's bad for them, and 'You Love Who You Love' is saying enough is enough." The song peaked at number 8 in Sweden.

== Background ==
Larsson began teasing her fourth studio album with a series of singles, including "Can't Tame Her," "End of Time," and her collaboration with David Guetta, "On My Love." "You Love Who You Love" was produced by MTHR in collaboration with MNEK and Danja. According to Zara Larsson, the track was initially written during pride and inspired by conversations about the freedom to love anyone — while recognizing that love isn't always wise. She explained, "We've all had that friend, or been that friend, who keeps going back to someone who's bad for them, and "You Love Who You Love" is saying enough is enough."

== Composition ==
Larsson notes, "There's humor to it, like with "You Love Who You Love" or "None of These Guys", but there's also a vulnerability and calmness, the healing which I haven't really done before."

== Theme and impact ==
Larsson stated that "You Love Who You Love" was written to reflect on toxic relationships, particularly the tendency to stay with someone who is clearly wrong. While mindful of her LGBTQIA+ fanbase, she aimed to avoid sounding preachy, instead offering a more personal and ironic take on the phrase. She also emphasized pop music's deep connection to queer culture, noting its power for escapism, self-expression, and empowerment.

== Music video ==
The music video for "You Love Who You Love" features Larsson as a pawn shop owner who sells an "I'm Sorry" necklace to a customer and fans herself with the cash. Scenes alternate between her working at the shop, singing karaoke, and dancing in the office. The visuals complement the song's narrative, which addresses a friend unwilling to leave a toxic relationship.

== Charts ==
=== Weekly charts ===
Weekly chart performance for "You Love Who You Love"
Chart (2024)	Peak position
Estonia Airplay (TopHit)	23
Finland Airplay (Suomen virallinen radiosoittolista)	18
Lithuania Airplay (TopHit)	32
New Zealand Hot Singles (RMNZ)	22
Norway (VG-lista)	28
Sweden (Sverigetopplistan)	8
UK Sales Chart (OCC)	16
UK Downloads Chart (OCC)	15

=== Year-end charts ===
Year-end chart performance for "You Love Who You Love"
Chart (2024)	Position
Estonia Airplay (TopHit)	120
