= Eurosummer =

Song by Zara Larsson

from the album Midnight Sun
- Released: 26 September 2025
- Genre: Eurodance
- Length: 2:52
- Label: Sommer House; Epic
- Songwriters: Zara Larsson; Uzoechi Emenike; Helena Gao; Kevin Hickey; Mary Weitz; Margo Wildman
- Producers: Margo XS; Zhone

Audio
- "Eurosummer" on YouTube

"Eurosummer" (sometimes listed as "Euro Summer" on early physical editions) is a song recorded by Swedish singer Zara Larsson from her fifth studio album, Midnight Sun (2025). The song was written by Larsson alongside her long-time collaborator Uzoechi Emenike, Helena Gao, Kevin Hickey, Mary Weitz and Margo Wildman. Wildman as well as Zhone handled the songs production. The name of the song was coined after "European Summer". The song debuted and peaked in Sweden at position 84 following the album's release.

After teasing the track listing, "Eurosummer" was first revealed in September 2025 alongside the official track list announcement for Midnight Sun. The song's duration was also revealed. Larsson stated that she was inspired by 'the throwbacks of when [she] grew up' and songs that contained accordions as well as other songs such as "Mr. Saxobeat". The song has been described as Latin, Eurodance and Balkan-pop, the lyrics advertising a 'carefree mindset'. Larsson named the European festival leg of her Midnight Sun Tour after the song.

== Eurosummer - Girls Trip ==
"Eurosummer - Girls Trip"

Promotional single by Zara Larsson and Shakira

from the album Midnight Sun: Girls Trip
- Language: English; Spanish
- Released: 7 June 2026
- Genre: Dance-pop
- Length: 2:50
- Label: Sommer House; Epic
- Songwriters: Zara Larsson; Scott Bruzenak; Uzoechi Emenike; Helena Gao; Kevin Hickey; Shakira Mebarak Ripoll; Theron Thomas; Mary Weitz; Margo Wildman
- Producers: Margo XS; Zhone; MNEK; Noisecastle III

Shakira promotional singles chronology
"Última" (2025)	"Eurosummer - Girls Trip" (2026)

Visualizer video
- "Eurosummer - Girls Trip" on YouTube

A remix of "Eurosummer", titled "Eurosummer - Girls Trip", was released alongside Larsson's remix album Midnight Sun: Girl's Trip (2026) that featured an appearance from Colombian singer-songwriter Shakira. The remix was released as part of Girls Trip on 7 June 2026.

A music video for the remix was recorded in Miami in 2026, but following evaluation from Larsson she ultimately decided to scrap the video and not release it. "Eurosummer - Girls Trip" has been described as a pop song that incorporates elements of dance music. The remix appeared on numerous global charts following its release, such as charting at position 83 on the OCC in the United Kingdom, first dated 8 May 2026.
