= Midnight Sun (Zara Larsson album) =

Studio album by Zara Larsson
- Released: 26 September 2025
- Studios: Muzo; Just for the Record; Geejam
- Genres: Electropop; dance-pop; drum and bass
- Length: 31:58
- Labels: Sommer House; Epic
- Producers: ASAP P on the Boards: Helena Gao; MNEK; Margo XS; Jon Shave; Zhone

Zara Larsson chronology
Venus (2024)	Midnight Sun (2025)	Midnight Sun: Girls Trip (2026)

Singles from Midnight Sun
- 1. "Pretty Ugly" Released: 25 April 2025; 2. "Midnight Sun" Released: 13 June 2025; 3. "Crush" Released: 15 August 2025; 4. "Blue Moon" Released: 15 October 2026

Midnight Sun is the fifth studio album by Swedish singer and songwriter Zara Larsson. It was released on 26 September 2025, through Sommer House and Epic Records. Larsson worked with a range of collaborators on the album, including MNEK, as well as Margo XS, Zhone, and Helena Gao. Inspired by the atmosphere of summer in Sweden, the ten-track project blends electropop, dance-pop, and drum and bass with introspective songwriting, characterised by its focus on personal themes such as ambition, identity, and self-reflection.

Midnight Sun received universal acclaim from music critics, who praised Larsson's lyrical evolution, vocal performance, and Swedish-tinged production. The album reached number one in Sweden, becoming her third chart-topping album in her home country, and reached the top ten in Norway. It was supported by the release of four singles: "Pretty Ugly", "Midnight Sun", "Crush", and "Blue Moon”. One promotional single, "Hot & Sexy", was released on 13 February 2026. To promote the album, Larsson embarked on the Midnight Sun Tour, which began in Europe in October 2025 and concluded in Bangkok in November 2026. A remix album, Midnight Sun: Girls Trip, was released on 1 May 2026, which became Larsson's final album with Epic before she moved to RCA Records later that year.

== Background ==
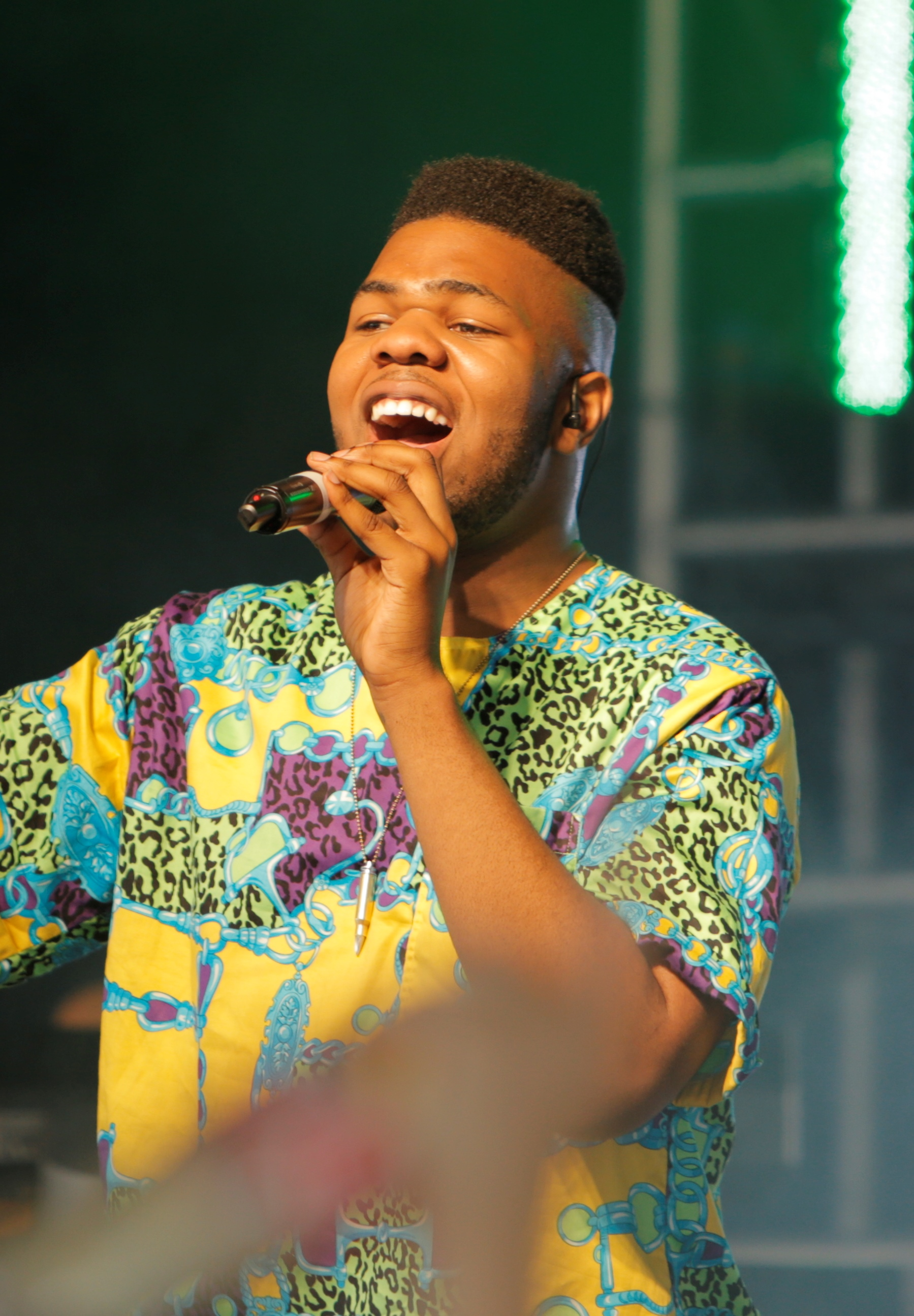
In Midnight Sun, Larsson worked with her longtime collaborator MNEK (pictured).

Midnight Sun sees Larsson taking creative control, working closely with longtime collaborator MNEK, as well as producers Margo XS, Zhone, and songwriter Helena Gao. According to Larsson, the album draws inspiration from the Swedish summer and aims to evoke the atmosphere of a night that never ends. In a message to fans, she expressed that Midnight Sun reflects her identity as an artist, describing it as her most personal work to date.

"In thinking about this album, I thought, 'What do I want to say? What do I want this to be?' I really am proud of my Swedish pop heritage, so I wanted to write about a Swedish summer where the sun never goes down. I wanted the whole album to feel like it's a summer night and it never ends. And it doesn't matter if it's December: the summer night will be there for you. It's waiting for you, it will come back for you, and you will come back for it."

Larsson has described it as being shaped by years of reflection and artistic development. During the four-year period between So Good (2017) and Poster Girl (2021), she recorded and ultimately scrapped several album versions, citing the pressure to deliver a strong commercial follow-up. Reflecting on the process, she stated: "I must have had five albums in those four years that I was just like, 'No, no, no, not good enough. Let's start over'". The title Midnight Sun was chosen early on and revisited multiple times, with Larsson writing several songs under the same name before finalizing the concept.

In a March 2026 interview with Elle magazine, Larsson discussed the upcoming release of the album's deluxe edition, teasing that the expanded project will be "a motherquake". On 30 March 2026, during a soundcheck for her Midnight Sun Tour in Philadelphia, she confirmed a fan's question about whether the deluxe version would be similar to Charli XCX's remix album, Brat and It's Completely Different but Also Still Brat (2024). She also noted that the upcoming remixes would feature artists that she has "been dreaming of working with". On 1 April 2026, MNEK indicated that they were set to begin work on the deluxe edition the following week.

== Composition ==
Midnight Sun is an electropop, dance-pop, and drum and bass record that blends polished pop production with introspective lyrics, drawing on Larsson's experiences with ambition, self-doubt, and personal growth. Lyrically, Larsson embraces life's messiness with refreshing honesty, chronicling her navigation of public scrutiny and private growth while acknowledging the grey areas that define adult existence. It incorporates a range of styles, including trance, Brazilian funk, and ballroom-inspired sounds, creating a diverse palette that complements its thematic focus on personal growth and youthful energy. According to The Fader, the album carries a distinctive quality compared to her earlier work.

=== Songs ===
Midnight Sun opens with the title track, which draws inspiration from summer nights in Sweden, where the sun barely sets and the atmosphere feels timeless. Larsson described the song as central to defining the album's tone, blending a sense of freedom with emotional depth. An electroclash and pop song, it was noted by critics as a departure from the sound of her previous effort Venus (2024). The song captures themes of clarity, presence, and paradoxical carefreeness, which she summed up as: "I don't give a fuck, but I do care a lot, and I hope and I pray and I manifest." "Blue Moon" is characterised as a Baltimore club–influenced love story, while "Pretty Ugly" as a hedonistic shrugging-off of traditional roles by way of "Hollaback Girl". "Girl's Girl" explores the internal conflict of having an attraction to a close friend's boyfriend, with Larsson noting that the song was inspired by her own experiences at sixteen. "Crush" addresses the challenge of resisting attraction to a forbidden subject. "Eurosummer" is a Eurodance song that details a casual summer relationship in Europe.

"Hot & Sexy" combines bubblegum bass, Brazilian funk, and techno elements, incorporating themes of female autonomy and societal expectations. Larsson stated that the song concludes with a message emphasizing the right for women to enjoy themselves freely, regardless of external judgments. It also draws on ballroom influences, adding a vogue-inspired energy that underscores its playful yet confrontational tone. The track "The Ambition" reflects these themes, addressing internal pressure and comparison. Larsson has described ambition as "both a blessing and a curse", influencing the album's emotional tone. The concept of the "midnight sun" serves as a symbolic link to her Swedish roots and evolving identity. The penultimate track, "Saturn's Return" is described as reflective, airy, and celestial, with Larsson singing about letting go of pressures and embracing uncertainty. The album's closer, "Puss Puss", begins as a personal sign-off to a boyfriend over the phone and transitions into an uptempo track.

== Promotion ==
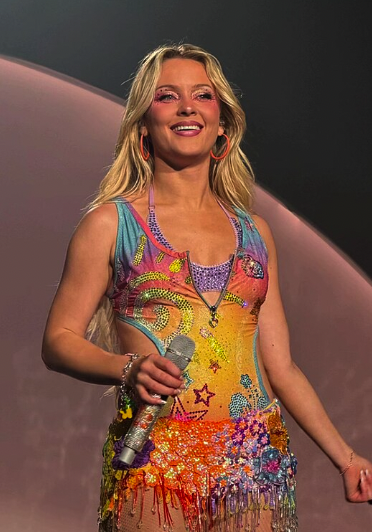
Larsson performing at the Midnight Sun Tour in 2026.

Midnight Sun was accompanied by vibrant styling that Larsson described as a "European Hawaii" look—"like Scandinavian core blended with tropical fantasy". With makeup done by Sophia Sinot, and styling and creative direction done by Caterina Ospina and Kai Movellan, Larsson gained media attention for Midnight Sun's aesthetic.

Larsson promoted Midnight Sun with an iHeartRadio Album Release Party, where she performed new music and participated in a Q&A hosted by iHeartRadio's JoJo. The event was broadcast on 29 September via iHeartRadio's Hit Nation station. In October 2025, Larsson appeared on UK content creator GK Barry's podcast Saving Grace to further promote the project. In further promotion for the album, she opened for Tate McRae's Miss Possessive Tour in North America.

Larsson embarked on the Midnight Sun Tour in support of the album, which began in October 2025. The tour visits cities in Europe and North America. In April, Larsson announced that a deluxe edition of the album, subtitled Girls Trip, would be released on 1 May. Later revealed to be a remix album, Midnight Sun: Girls Trip contains remixed versions of the songs from the original album, featuring artists including Emilia, PinkPantheress, Robyn, Shakira, and Tyla, among others.

In September 2025, Prime Video announced the release of Zara Larsson – Up Close, a documentary directed by Lise Bergvall that follows Larsson during the recording and promotion of Midnight Sun. It was released worldwide on 20 November 2025.

=== Singles ===
The album's lead single, "Pretty Ugly", was released on 25 April 2025, alongside its music video directed by Charlotte Rutherford and choreographed by Zoi Tatopoulos. Commercially, the track reached number 14 in Sweden, and number 61 in Norway. The title track "Midnight Sun" was released on 13 June, as the album's second single. Its music video was released on 24 June, and takes inspiration from the Y2K aesthetic. The track reached number four in Sweden, number 12 on the US Billboard Hot 100, where it became Larsson's highest charting solo song, and number seven in the United Kingdom. It also reached number 1 on the US Pop Airplay chart.

On 15 August, "Crush" was released as the third single from Midnight Sun. Its music video was released on 27 August, and was directed by Grant James Thomas. The track was the second single from the album to be sent to contemporary hit radio in the United States, following "Pretty Ugly", where it reached number 17 on the Pop Airplay chart, and number one on the Dance/Mix Show Airplay chart. Elsewhere, the track reached number 32 in Sweden, and number 56 in Norway. On 13 February 2026, Larsson released "Hot & Sexy" as 7-inch single alongside "Crush", via Urban Outfitters, as the album's first promotional single.

Larsson began teasing a "Blue Moon" music video in late 2026 across her social media platforms. Following the initial announcement that there was a music video to be released for the song, it was announced on 11 October that "Blue Moon" would be receiving a music video on 14 October.

== Critical reception ==
Professional ratings
Aggregate scores
Source	Rating
AnyDecentMusic?	7.6/10
Metacritic	89/100
Review scores
Source	Rating
AllMusic	4.5/5 stars
Clash	8/10
Dagens Nyheter	3/5
DIY	4.5/5 stars
Dork	4/5
Gaffa	5/6 stars
Göteborgs-Posten	4/5 stars
Rolling Stone	4/5 stars
Stereoboard	3/5 stars
Svenska Dagbladet	3 on a 1–6 scale

According to the review aggregator Metacritic, Midnight Sun received "universal acclaim" based on a weighted average score of 89 out of 100 from 4 critic scores. The review aggregator site AnyDecentMusic? compiled 7 reviews and gave the album an average of 7.6 out of 10, based on their assessment of the critical consensus.

AllMusic praised Midnight Sun as a breezy and energetic dance-pop album that reflects both Larsson's Swedish roots and her personal growth. The review highlighted her Rihanna-like vocals, diverse production from collaborators including MNEK, and a balance between euphoric pop tracks and more introspective moments. Clash described the album as a return to form for Larsson, contrasting it with Venus. It noted that the album avoids heavy concepts in favor of consistently catchy Scandipop. DIY described Midnight Sun as a vibrant, maximalist pop record that blends electronica, dance, Scandi-pop, and R&B, showcasing Larsson's versatility. The review also highlighted her reunion with MNEK, praising the album's energetic production and its mix of bold party tracks and more introspective moments. Dork wrote that while Midnight Sun opens with the polished, radio-friendly pop Larsson is known for, the album ultimately reflects her own confident personality and independence from outside expectations. Rolling Stone wrote that Midnight Sun sustains "high-energy dance-pop joy" from beginning to end, celebrating the endless summer atmosphere of Larsson's native Sweden. The title track was highlighted as "deliriously hypnotic", capturing the experience of partying through 24 hours of daylight.

In a more mixed assessment, Stereoboard's Jack Press rated the album three out of five stars, noting that while MNEK's production elevates weaker material, it also ties Larsson to retrospective sounds when bolder reinvention might have been more effective. He concluded that Midnight Sun works better as a course correction than a breakthrough, improving on Venus while still leaning too safely on nostalgia.

"Midnight Sun" and "Blue Moon" were nominated for Best Dance Pop Recording at the 68th and 69th Annual Grammy Awards becoming Larsson's first Grammy nominations.

== Accolades ==
Awards and nominations
Year	Award	Category	Result	Ref.
2026	Grammis	Pop Album of the Year	Won	
2026	American Music Awards	Breakthrough Album of the Year	Won	

== Commercial performance ==
Midnight Sun debuted at number one in Sweden, Larsson's home country. Across Europe, the album debuted at number 10 in Norway, number 18 in Germany, and number 33 in Denmark. It also debuted at number 36 in the United Kingdom and number 49 in Spain. The album debuted at number 31 on the ARIA Albums chart in Australia. In New Zealand, the album peaked at number 22 on the Official New Zealand Albums Chart. In the United States, the album debuted at number 119 on the Billboard 200, eventually peaking at number 36 following the Girls Trip reissue, earning Larsson her second top forty album in the country following So Good (2017).

== Track listing ==
Midnight Sun track listing
No.	Title	Writer(s)	Producer(s)	Length
1.	"Midnight Sun"	Zara Larsson; Uzoechi Emenike; Helena Gao; Margo Wildman	Gao; Margo XS	3:09
2.	"Blue Moon"	Larsson; Emenike; Gao; Kevin Hickey; Wildman	Margo XS; MNEK; Zhone	3:02
3.	"Pretty Ugly"	Larsson; Emenike; Gao; Wildman	Margo XS; MNEK	2:38
4.	"Girl's Girl"	Larsson; Patricio Contreras; Emenike; Aminata Kabba; Tyler Christian Lewis	ASAP P on the Boards; MNEK	2:58
5.	"Crush"	Larsson; Emenike; Gao; Hickey; Wildman	Margo XS; Zhone	2:57
6.	"Eurosummer"	Larsson; Emenike; Gao; Hickey; Mary Weitz; Wildman	Margo XS; Zhone	2:52
7.	"Hot & Sexy"	Larsson; Emenike; Gao; Hickey; Tiffany Pollard; Jon Shave; Wildman	Margo XS; Zhone; Shave	3:09
8.	"The Ambition"	Larsson; Emenike; Gao; Wildman	Margo XS; MNEK	3:34
9.	"Saturn's Return"	Larsson; Emenike; Gao; Hickey; Wildman	Margo XS; MNEK; Zhone	3:47
10.	"Puss Puss"	Larsson; Emenike; Gao; Wildman	Margo XS	3:48
Total length:				31:58

=== Notes ===
- "Eurosummer" is listed as "Euro Summer" on early physical releases.
- "Saturn's Return" is placed as the sixth track on early physical releases, and doesn't include an apostrophe when listed on the back cover in early CD releases.

== Credits and personnel ==
Credits were adapted from the liner notes and Tidal.

=== Recording locations ===
- Muzo Studios (1, 3, 4)
- Just for the Record (1, 5, 6, 7, 9, 10)
- Geejam Studios (2)

=== Personnel ===
- Zara Larsson – lead vocals (all tracks), background vocals (1, 2, 4, 5, 7–10)
- Tom Norris – mixing
- Kaelen Russel – engineering
- Ezekiel Lewis – A&R
- Kalli Clark-Stemberg – A&R
- Randy Merrill – mastering (1, 3–5, 7, 9, 10)
- Idania Valencia – mastering (2, 6, 8)
- Helena Gao – background vocals (2, 7)
- Zhone – drums, keyboards, programming (5–7, 9)
- MNEK – background vocals (7), executive producer
- Margo XS – background vocals (7)
- Tiffany Pollard – background vocals (7)
- Harry Daniels – background vocals (8)

== Charts ==
=== Weekly charts ===
Weekly chart performance
Chart (2025–2026)	Peak position
Australian Albums (ARIA)	31
Austrian Albums (Ö3 Austria)	34
Belgian Albums (Ultratop Flanders)	15
Belgian Albums (Ultratop Wallonia)	38
Canadian Albums (Billboard)	38
Croatian International Albums (HDU)	21
Danish Albums (Hitlisten)	33
Dutch Albums (Album Top 100)	15
Finnish Albums (Suomen virallinen lista)	29
French Albums (SNEP)	66
German Albums (Offizielle Top 100)	41
German Pop Albums (Offizielle Top 100)	18
Hungarian Physical Albums (MAHASZ)	12
Irish Albums (Official Charts)	36
New Zealand Albums (RMNZ)	6
Norwegian Albums (IFPI Norge)	10
Polish Albums (ZPAV)	40
Portuguese Albums (AFP)	26
Scottish Albums (Official Charts)	12
Spanish Albums (PROMUSICAE)	41
Swedish Albums (Sverigetopplistan)	1
Swiss Albums (Schweizer Hitparade)	31
UK Albums (Official Charts)	36
US Billboard 200	36
US Top Dance Albums (Billboard)	2

=== Year-end charts ===
Year-end chart performance
Chart (2025)	Position
Swedish Albums (Sverigetopplistan)	78

== Certifications ==
Certifications
Region	Certification	Certified units/sales
Hungary (MAHASZ)	Platinum	4,000^{‡}
Norway (IFPI Norway)	Gold	10,000^{‡}
Sweden (GLF)	Platinum	30,000^{‡}
^{‡} Sales+streaming figures based on certification alone.

== Release history ==
List of release dates and formats
Region	Date	Format(s)	Edition(s)	Label	Ref.
Various	26 September 2025	CD; digital download; LP; streaming	Standard	Sommer House; Epic	
