= Sophia Sinot =

Dutch makeup artist

Sophia Sinot (born 1997 or 1998) is a Dutch makeup artist. She is best known for her work with Swedish musician Zara Larsson.

== Life and career ==
Sinot grew up in Huizen, Netherlands. She first considered makeup artistry as a career when she was 18 years old. She moved to Amsterdam and attended House of Orange Makeup School. She registered herself as a company in 2018. Sinot is based in London and represented by the Wall Group talent agency.

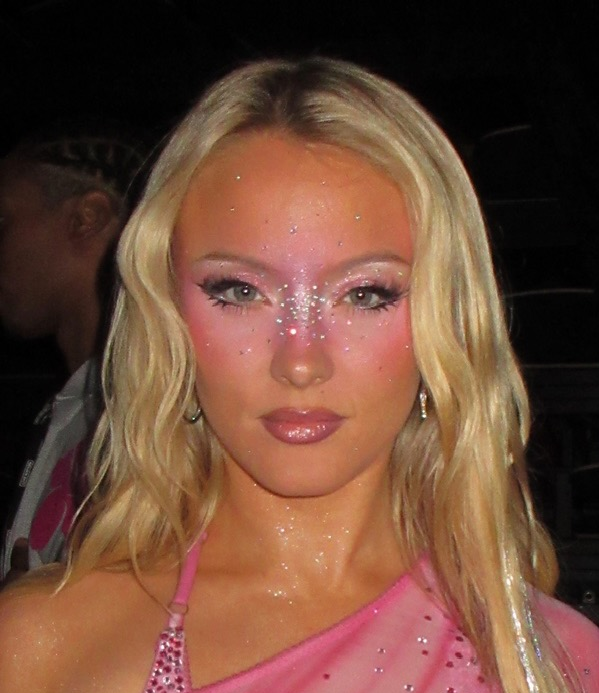
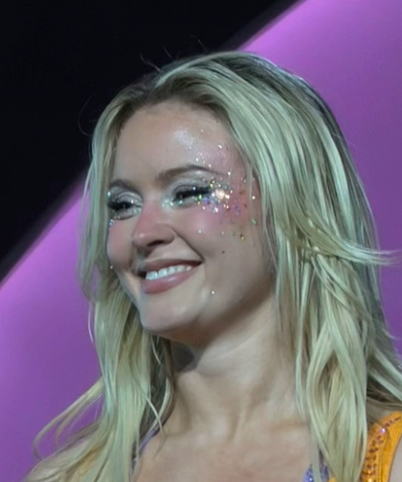
Zara Larsson in makeup done by Sinot for the Midnight Sun Tour

Sinot began working with Zara Larsson in 2020. She has also worked with Doja Cat, including for her appearance at Balenciaga's spring 2023 show at Paris Fashion Week. Also in 2023, Sinot received attention on social media for her two-toned "lip combo" application on JT for Mugler's fall/winter show at Paris Fashion Week.

Sinot rose to prominence in 2025 with the release of Larsson's fifth studio album, Midnight Sun. Sinot was Larsson's makeup artist for the Midnight Sun Tour. Sinot's work with Larsson for the Midnight Sun era has been credited for increasing the popularity of vibrant, glittering, and maximalist makeup looks. In 2026, Sinot was the makeup artist for Katseye's "Pinky Up" music video.

== Artistry ==
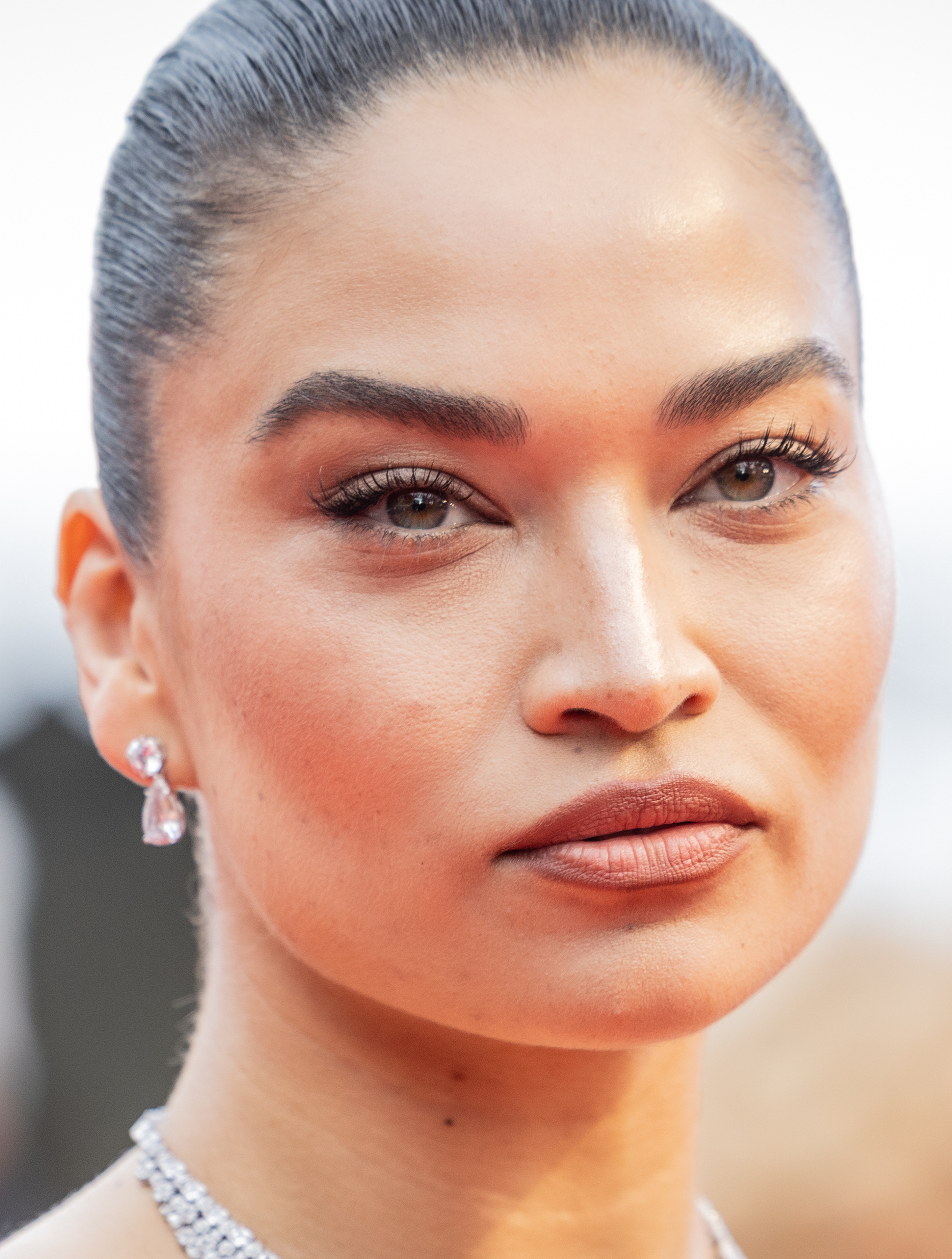
Sinot did the makeup of Shanina Shaik for the 2025 Cannes Film Festival.

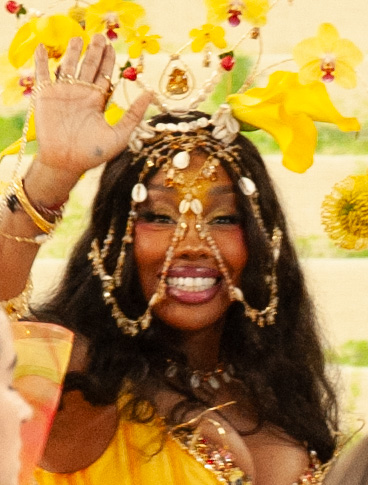
Sinot did the makeup of SZA for the 2026 Met Gala.

Sinot's style, which is influenced by Y2K aesthetics, is characterised by bright colours, rhinestones, and glitter. Sinot's style has been described—by herself and others—as an alternative to the clean girl aesthetic popularized in the 2020s. Her work, especially with Larsson, often includes highly pigmented blush placed high on the cheek and nose, evoking the appearance of a sunburn.

Discussing her work, Sinot said: "Apparently, I have a recognisable style, but I don't just do one style of make-up. I love a natural look, a full beat, dirty SFX make-up, a glam look, face paint – the list goes on." With special effects makeup, Sinot has simulated cuts and bruises on Doja Cat and Troye Sivan. In a 2022 interview, Sinot stated that she has "always been inspired by the human mind and technology"; she has hosted a Discord community for AI art, worked on an NFT project, and used AI-generated filters as inspiration for her work.

Among her influences, Sinot has cited Michelle Phan, Christina Aguilera, RuPaul's Drag Race, and Barbie. Her work with Larsson has been described as similar in style to Doniella Davy's work on Euphoria and Ngozi Esther Edeme's work with Olandria.
