= Harry Daniels =

Harry Daniels may refer to:

- Harry Daniels (British Army officer) (1884–1953), British Army officer and recipient of the Victoria Cross
- Harry Clifton Daniels (1900–1965), American competitive swimmer and water polo player
- Harry Daniels (footballer) (1920–2002), English footballer
- Harry Daniels (internet personality) (born 2003 or 2004), American internet personality
- Harry Daniels, plaintiff in Daniels v Canada (Indian Affairs and Northern Development)
