= Blue Moon (Zara Larsson song) =

2026 single by Zara Larsson

Single by Zara Larsson

from the album Midnight Sun
- Released: 15 October 2026
- Length: 3:02
- Label: Sommer House; Epic
- Songwriters: Zara Larsson; Helena Gao; Uzoechi Emenike; Margo Wildman; Kevin Hickey
- Producers: Zhone; Margo XS; Uzoechi Emenike

Zara Larsson singles chronology
"Talk to Me, Zara" (2026)	"Blue Moon" (2026)

"Blue Moon" is a song by Swedish singer and songwriter Zara Larsson from her fifth studio album, Midnight Sun (2025). It was released as the album's fourth single on 15 October 2026, through Sommer House and Epic Records. The song was produced by Zhone, Margo XS and MNEK; who wrote it along with Larsson and Helena Gao. The song reached the top forty in Belgium (Flanders), New Zealand, and Sweden. In 2026, the song was nominated for Best Dance Pop Recording at the 69th Annual Grammy Awards.

== Background ==
Blue Moon is the second track from Larsson’s fifth studio album Midnight Sun (2025). The song was later re-recorded with American singer Kehlani for Larsson’s remix album Midnight Sun: Girls Trip (2026). In September 2026 in an article with Billboard, Larsson expressed her intention to promote “Blue Moon” further, describing it as the “sister” of the album’s title track and stating that it deserved a music video and greater recognition. A year following the track’s original release, the song became the album's fourth single on October 15, 2026.

== Music video ==
On September 30, 2026, during her Midnight Sun Tour at the Greek Theatre in Los Angeles, Larsson revealed an exclusive teaser for the Blue Moon music video. She revealed that the video would represent “an era within an era” and would be her biggest budget music video to date. A string of teasers were posted on her Instagram before being announced for release on October 15, 2026. The video was directed by Charlotte Rutherford and produced by Someday Studio.

== Charts ==
=== Original version ===
Chart performance
Chart (2025–2026)	Peak position
Australia (ARIA)	90
Belgium (Ultratop 50 Flanders)	32
Croatia International Airplay (Top lista)	66
Czech Republic Airplay (ČNS IFPI)	33
Estonia Airplay (TopHit)	48
Germany Airplay (MusicTrace)	98
Latvia Airplay (LaIPA)	10
Lithuania Airplay (TopHit)	120
Netherlands (Dutch Top 40)	32
Netherlands (Single Tip)	24
New Zealand (Recorded Music NZ)	39
New Zealand Airplay (RCS)	10
Norway (VG-lista)	76
Sweden (Sverigetopplistan)	16
UK Video Streaming (Official Charts)	46
US Hot Dance/Pop Songs (Billboard)	13

=== Girls Trip version ===
Chart performance
Chart (2026)	Peak position
New Zealand Hot Singles (Recorded Music NZ)	22
Sweden Heatseeker (Sverigetopplistan)	1
