= V.I.P. – Very Important Pony =

v.i.p – very important pony

EP by horsegiirL
- Released: 24 January 2025
- Genres: Hardstyle; eurodance; happy hardcore
- Length: 13:52
- Label: Three Six Zero Recordings
- Producers: horsegiirL; Namasenda; FREE Jimi; Mietze Conte; Outrovert; DJ G2G; DJ Carli

HorsegiirL chronology
v.i.p – very important pony (2025)	Nature Is Healing (2026)

Singles from v.i.p – very important pony
- 1. "Eat, Sleep, Slay, 🔁" Released: 12 September 2024; 2. "Take It Offff" Released: 14 November 2024

V.I.P. – Very Important Pony (stylized in all lowercase) is the debut EP by German singer-songwriter and DJ horsegiirL, released on 24 January 2025 via Three Six Zero Recordings. The EP has been describes as fusing hardstyle, eurodance, and happy hardcore. The record has been noted for its maximalist production and manic energy.

== Reception ==
Allison Harris of Pitchfork noted a balance between "sophisticated technique" and silliness. Margaret Farrell of Flood Magazine said the EP was "silly, stupid, and doesn’t warrant a cynical thesis", adding that despite its absurdity, fusing inspirations from artists such as Crazy Frog and Lady Gaga, it still "feels powerfully innocent instead of a corny barnyard schtick."

Oscar Lund of The Skinny gave the album a lukewarm review with a rating of 3/5, believing that while the EP is well produced, it occasionally lacks originality and could come off as bland, highlighting "Bby Luv x3" as a "generic euro-hardstyle track". Despite that, they still concluded stating they had hopes for the future, noting "material hor$e" and "giirL math" as high points.

== Track listing ==
v.i.p – very important pony track listing
No.	Title	Length
1.	"MateriaL Hor$e"	1:34
2.	"Take It Offff"	2:10
3.	"GiirL Math" (with Namasenda)	2:29
4.	"Eat, Sleep, Slay, 🔁"	2:29
5.	"Bby Luv x3" (featuring DJ G2G)	3:17
6.	"Scene Before the Kiss XOXO"	1:53
Total length:		13:52
