= Grammy Award for Best Dance Pop Recording =

Award presented by the Recording Academy

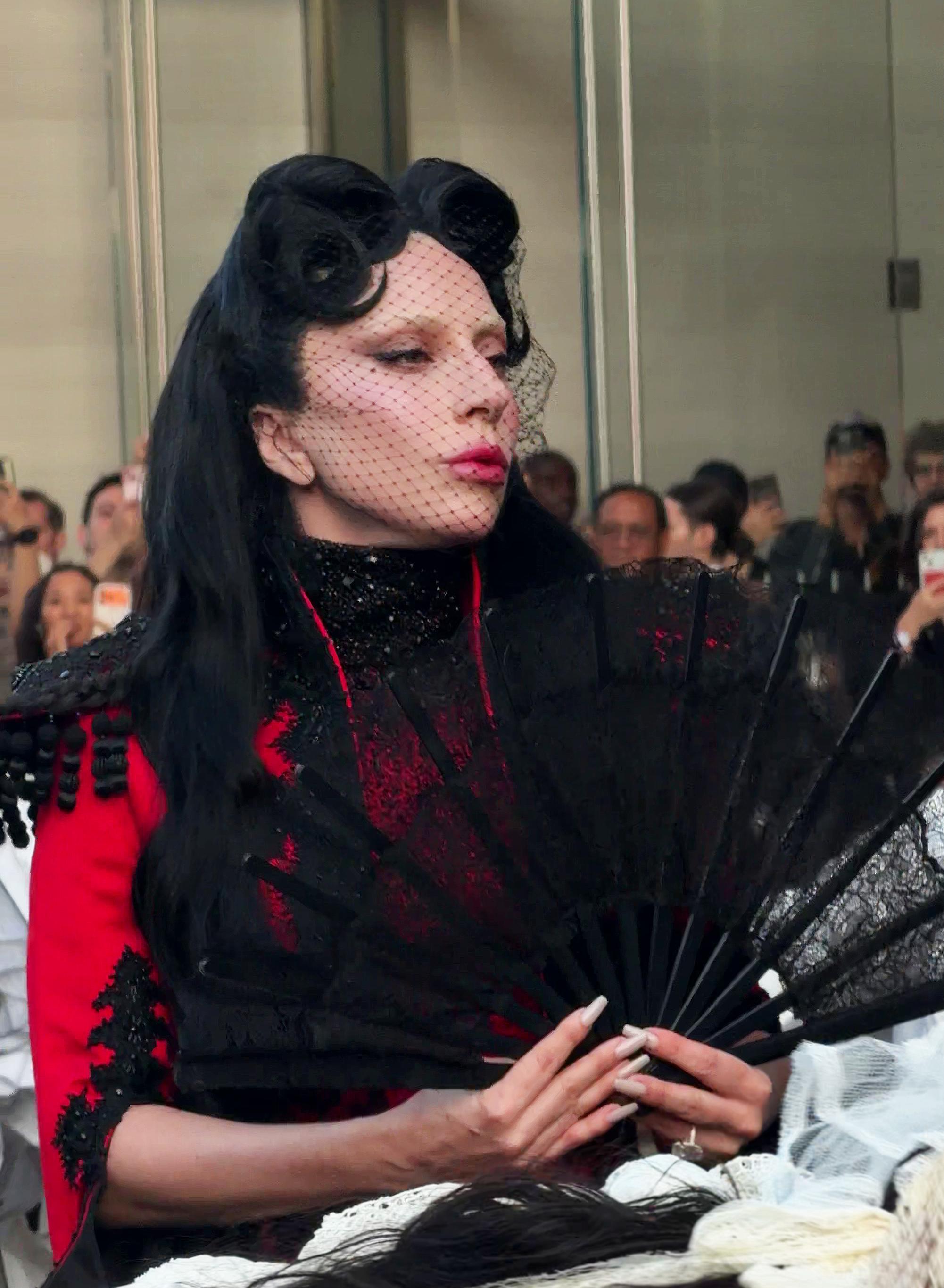
- "Abracadabra" by Lady Gaga is the most recent recipient.
- Awarded for: Quality vocal or instrumental dance pop recordings (tracks or singles only)
- Presented by: National Academy of Recording Arts and Sciences
- First award: 2024
- Currently held by: Lady Gaga – "Abracadabra" (2026)

Highlights
- Most nominations: David Guetta, Troye Sivan, Zara Larsson (2)
- Website: grammy.com

The Grammy Award for Best Dance Pop Recording is an award presented by the Recording Academy to honor quality dance pop music performances in any given year. The award was presented for the first time at the 66th Annual Grammy Awards in 2024, as a complement to the Grammy Award for Best Dance/Electronic Recording and the first new category honoring dance/electronic music since 2005. It was originally presented as Best Pop Dance Recording, but received its current name as of the 67th Annual Grammy Awards.

The academy announced the new category in June 2023, stating that the award goes to "tracks and singles that feature up-tempo, danceable music that follows a pop arrangement." Eligible pop dance recordings were also described as featuring "strong rhythmic beats, significant electronic-based instruments", and an emphasis on the "vocal performance, melody and hooks." Dance remixes are not eligible in this category and instead compete in the Grammy Award for Best Remixed Recording, Non-Classical category.

The award goes to the artist(s), producer(s), and mixer(s) of the song. Kylie Minogue, Charli XCX and Lady Gaga are the only acts so far to win in this category. David Guetta, Zara Larsson and Troye Sivan lead all performers with two nominations each, but they have yet to win in this category.

== Background ==
The creation of the category was described as "essential" by the Recording Academy, noting the increasing convergence between the pop and dance music genres over the preceding decades, specifically citing the work of artists such as Beyoncé, Lady Gaga, Madonna, Justin Timberlake, Janet Jackson, Britney Spears, Kylie Minogue, Rihanna and Cher, all of whom had previously won Grammys in the dance/electronic categories, and the former four also having previously won Grammys in the main pop categories. The introduction of the Best Pop Dance Recording category was seen as "overdue" by critics and Academy members alike, with members of the dance screening committee noting that they had historically struggled with determining where to place dance pop songs when determining category eligibility. This led to calls to introduce a specific category for these artists to be honored without them dominating the existing category and winning Grammys over dance acts who are not established household names.

Regarding the establishment of this category, which was announced alongside Best Alternative Jazz Album and Best African Music Performance, Recording Academy CEO Harvey Mason Jr. stated “The Recording Academy is proud to announce these latest category changes to our awards process. These changes reflect our commitment to actively listen and respond to the feedback from our music community, accurately represent a diverse range of relevant musical genres, and stay aligned with the ever-evolving musical landscape. By introducing these three new categories, we are able to acknowledge and appreciate a broader array of artists. We are excited to honor and celebrate the creators and recordings in these categories, while also exposing a wider range of music to fans worldwide.”

== Recipients ==
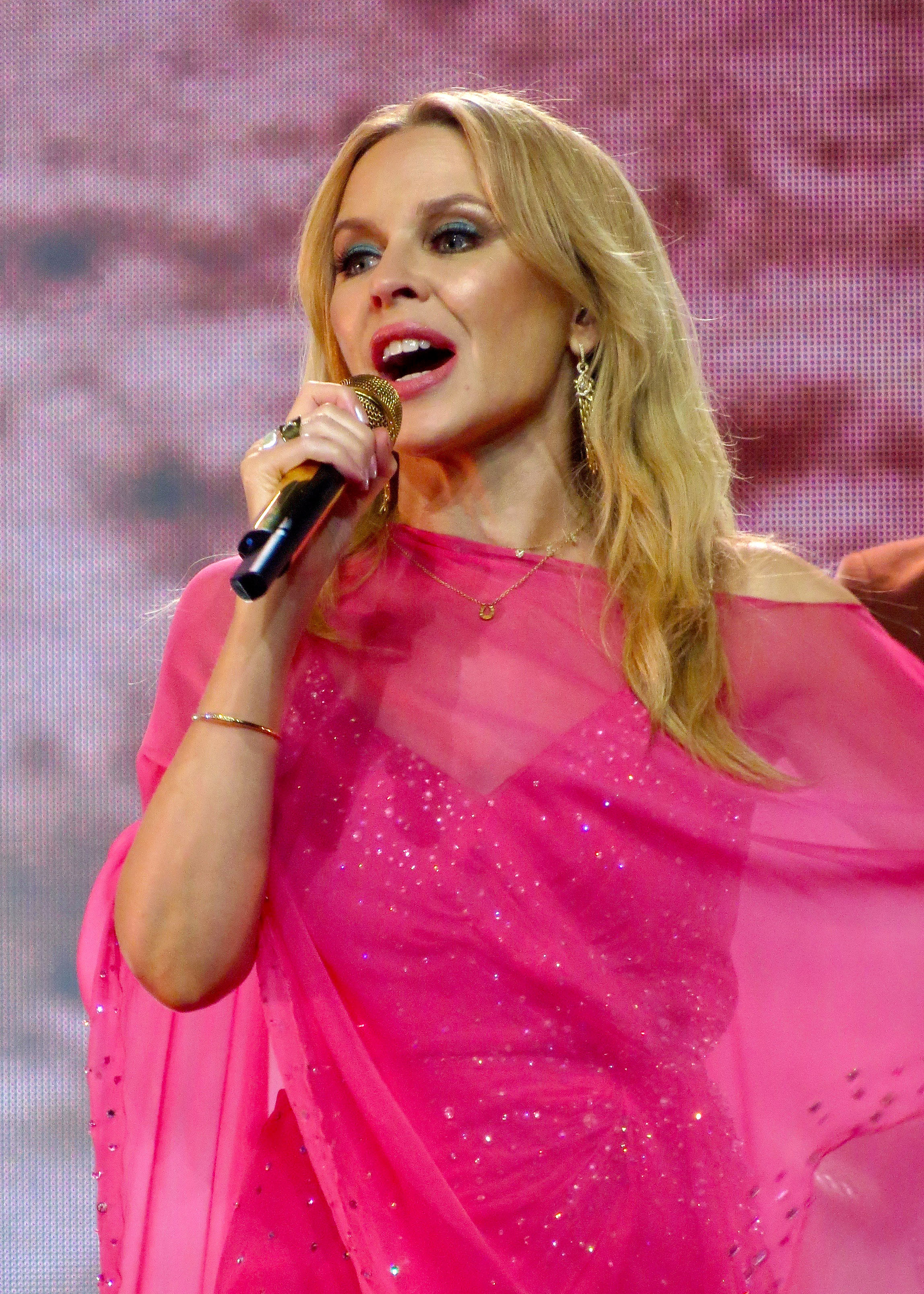
Inaugural winner Kylie Minogue

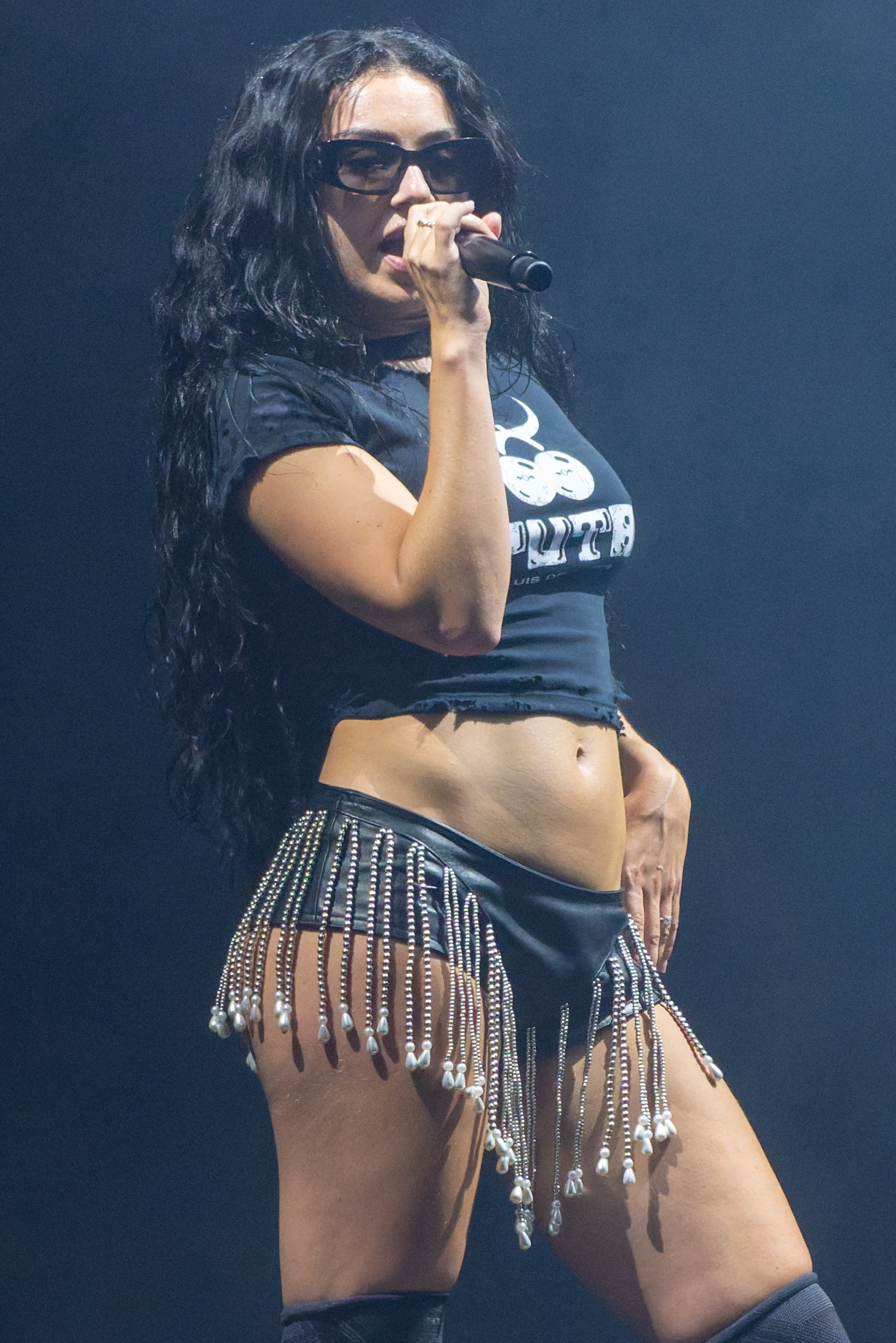
2025 winner Charli XCX

=== 2020s ===
Year^{[I]}	Artist(s)	Work	Production team
2024	Kylie Minogue	"Padam Padam"	Lostboy, producer; Guy Massey, mixer
2024	David Guetta, Anne-Marie and Coi Leray	"Baby Don't Hurt Me"	Johnny Goldstein, Toby Green, David Guetta and Mike Hawkins, producers; Șerban Ghenea, mixer
2024	Calvin Harris and Ellie Goulding	"Miracle"	Burns and Calvin Harris, producers; Calvin Harris, mixer
2024	Bebe Rexha and David Guetta	"One in a Million"	Burns and David Guetta, producers; Șerban Ghenea, mixer
2024	Troye Sivan	"Rush"	Styalz Fuego, Novodor and Zhone, producers; Alex Ghenea, mixer
2025	Charli XCX	"Von Dutch"	Finn Keane, producer; Tom Norris, mixer
2025	Madison Beer	"Make You Mine"	Madison Beer and Leroy Clampitt, producers; Mitch McCarthy, mixer
2025	Billie Eilish	"L'Amour de Ma Vie" (Over Now Extended Edit)	Billie Eilish and Finneas, producers; Jon Castelli and Aron Forbes, mixers
2025	Ariana Grande	"Yes, And?"	Ariana Grande, Ilya and Max Martin, producers; Șerban Ghenea, mixer
2025	Troye Sivan	"Got Me Started"	Ian Kirkpatrick, producer; Alex Ghenea, mixer
2026	Lady Gaga	"Abracadabra"	Lady Gaga, Cirkut and Andrew Watt, producers; Șerban Ghenea, mixer
2026	Selena Gomez and Benny Blanco	"Bluest Flame"	Benny Blanco, Dylan Brady and Cashmere Cat, producers; Benny Blanco and Cashmere Cat, mixers
2026	Zara Larsson	"Midnight Sun"	Margo XS and MNEK, producers; Tom Norris, mixer
2026	Tate McRae	"Just Keep Watching"	Tyler Spry and Ryan Tedder, producers; Manny Marroquin, mixer
2026	PinkPantheress	"Illegal"	Aksel Arvid and PinkPantheress, producers; Nickie Jon Pabón, mixer
2027	Zara Larsson	"Blue Moon"	Margo XS, MNEK and Zhone, producers; Tom Norris, mixer
2027	Madonna	"Danceteria"	Cirkut, Madonna, Stuart Price and Andrew Watt, producers; Stuart Price, mixer
2027	Raye	"Life Boat."	Punctual, Rachel Keen and Jordan Riley, producers; Jon Castelli, mixer
2027	Slayyyter	"Dance..."	Valley Girl, producer; Clint Gibbs, mixer
2027	Tinashe	"Too Easy"	Kimj and Zack Sekoff, producers; Tom Norris, mixer

^{^[I]} Each year is linked to the article about the Grammy Awards held that year.

== Artists with multiple nominations ==
2 nominations

- David Guetta
- Zara Larsson
- Troye Sivan
