= Venus (Zara Larsson album) =

- Digital artwork

Studio album by Zara Larsson
- Released: 9 February 2024
- Genres: Dance-pop; Europop; Scandipop; EDM
- Length: 39:10
- Labels: Sommer House; Epic
- Producers: Austin Corona; Danja; John Christopher Fee; David Guetta; Dave Hamelin; Jack & Coke; Rob Kinelski; Manny Marroquin; MTHR; Rick Nowels; Giorgio Tuinfort

Zara Larsson chronology
Honor the Light (2023)	Venus (2024)	Midnight Sun (2025)

Singles from Venus
- 1. "Can't Tame Her" Released: 26 January 2023; 2. "End of Time" Released: 19 May 2023; 3. "On My Love" Released: 15 September 2023; 4. "You Love Who You Love" Released: 19 January 2024

Venus is the fourth studio album by Swedish singer and songwriter Zara Larsson. It was released on 9 February 2024 through Sommer House and Epic Records. A dance-pop album, Venus includes themes of love, heartbreak and also explores Larsson's personal relationships with her family and friends. The album was described by Larsson as a "full-on rollercoaster ride of emotion".

It was supported by four singles; "Can't Tame Her", "End of Time", "On My Love" with David Guetta and "You Love Who You Love". "Can't Tame Her" became a European airplay hit upon its release while "On My Love" reached the top twenty in several nations.

Upon its release, the album was met with generally positive reviews. Most critics praised the upbeat tracks and Larsson's vocal performance while having mixed reactions toward the slower songs. To promote the album, Larsson embarked on the Venus Tour, which began on 16 February 2024 in Manchester, United Kingdom and concluded on 7 November 2024 in New York, United States. Additionally, she joined Kygo as an opening act for the American shows of his 2024 world tour.

== Background ==
On 30 December 2022, Larsson announced that her upcoming album was 70% finished at the time. For the project, Larsson enlisted songwriters and producers Casey Smith, Rick Nowels and Danja to help her "pin down" the sounds she wanted to include. Nowels in particular assisted in creating a "foundation" for her new album, enabling Larsson to "do a little bit of this and a little bit of that". In an interview with the Official Charts Company in April 2023, she told fans to expect "uptempo, fun dance songs" as well as the "emotional balance". Larsson referred to the project as a "full-on rollercoaster ride of emotion". In May 2023, she described the record as "super fun" and summed it up as a "collection of really good music", ranging from ballads to "dancey" tracks.

Larsson officially announced the album on 26 October 2023 via Instagram. Venus sees the singer "assume greater ownership" over her output. A press release described the record as a "pop album fit for a goddess" that determines Larsson's "own agenda" partly by "looking back on where she's come from". It includes the singles "Can't Tame Her", "End of Time" and "On My Love". The album was accompanied by a European headlining tour, the Venus Tour, which took place from February to July 2024.

== Singles ==
"Can't Tame Her" was released on 26 January 2023 as the lead single from Venus, alongside its music video. The song entered the top five and top ten in Sweden and Norway, respectively, and peaked within the top ten of four other territories' airplay charts. The album's second single, "End of Time", was released on 19 May 2023, with a music video premiering the next day.

"On My Love" was released as the third single from the album on 15 September 2023. Her second collaboration with David Guetta, the song reached top three in Sweden and also became Larsson's first top twenty hit in the United Kingdom since "Ruin My Life" peaked at nine in 2019. "You Love Who You Love" was released as the album's fourth single on 19 January 2024.

== Artwork ==
The cover art of the digital and streaming edition reenacts the Sandro Botticelli painting, The Birth of Venus, and depicts Larsson as partially nude with a long golden hair and an "H" tattoo honoring her sister Hanna and holding a pink chrome seashell. A previous title and previous cover art shot in February 2023 were planned for the album, but Larsson was less than pleased with the results. Thus, she had the main artwork made without notifying her record label and paid for the artwork. She anticipated various editions for certain areas, like the Middle East, substituting a different artwork due to potential censorship.

== Critical reception ==
Professional ratings
Aggregate scores
Source	Rating
Metacritic	72/100
Review scores
Source	Rating
AllMusic	3.5/5 stars
Clash	7/10
DIY	4.5/5 stars
The Guardian	3/5 stars
The Skinny	3/5 stars

According to the review aggregator Metacritic, Venus received "generally favorable reviews" based on a weighted average score of 72 out of 100 from 7 critic scores.

In a review for AllMusic, Neil Yeung commented that the album was "bold" and "fun", yet still "very personal", describing that Larsson "expands her scope" to include "more shimmering dance-pop" and "neon-synth sheen". He praised Venus for evolving Larsson's sound. Writing for Clash, Luke Winstanley stated that Venus was "heaps of fun" and "packed with plenty of europop bangers to satisfy the faithful", though he criticized Larsson for surrendering to "commercial viability" during the album's "unfortunately frequent lows". He also noted that the album features a mix of euphoric dance-pop anthems, tender ballads, and sleek Scandipop, drawing comparisons to the retro-leaning style of The Weeknd.

In a review for DIY, Otis Robinson said that Venus was "crystallised" and "super fun", calling it a "lush flex of skill". However, he critiqued the album for having a "slightly crowded mishmash of genres - from dance to R&B to balladry". He noted that while the album at times leans into "conveyor-belt pop", it is "opulently executed", and highlighted Larsson's strength in embracing her Scandipop roots with "campy, hyperbolic sugary-sweetness" and a "full pop princess" flair. Michael Cragg from The Guardian appreciated the album's upbeat tracks but criticized its more serious, slow songs, commenting that Larsson was better at saving those emotions for "big floor-fillers". In a mixed review for The Skinny, Lucy Fitzgerald criticized Venus for feeling "out of date, trafficking in facsimiles of overproduced, mid-to-late 2010s pop", and noted that Larsson's talents were undersold by uninspired and incohesive shifts between EDM, Europop, and balladry.

== Track listing ==
Venus track listing
No.	Title	Lyrics	Music	Producer(s)	Length
1.	"Can't Tame Her"	Zara Larsson; Uzoechi Emenike	Karl Ivert; Kian Sang	MTHR; Danja^{[c]}	3:17
2.	"More Than This Was"	Larsson; Jacob Kasher; Amanda Ibanez	Svante Halldin; Jakob Hazell	Jack & Coke; Danja	3:13
3.	"On My Love" (with David Guetta)	Larsson; Jerome Castillo; Dewain Whitmore Jr.; Patrick Smith	Pierre Guetta; Giorgio Tuinfort; Andre Davidson; Sean Davidson	David Guetta; Tuinfort; Cesqeaux^{[c]}	3:42
4.	"Ammunition"	Larsson; Brittany Hazzard; Casey Smith	Smith; Rick Nowels	Danja; Manny Marroquin; Austin Corona; Nowels^{[p]}; Anastasia Boissier^{[a]}; John Christopher Fee^{[v]}	3:42
5.	"None of These Guys"	Larsson; Elin Bergman	Sang; Ivert; Carl Tarland	MTHR; Danja^{[c]}	2:42
6.	"You Love Who You Love"	Larsson; Emenike	Ivert; Sang	MTHR	3:05
7.	"End of Time"	Smith	Nowels; Smith	Nowels; Danja; Corona; Boissier^{[a]}	3:29
8.	"Nothing"	Larsson; Marcus Sepehrmanesh	Erik Hassle; Guffe Jonsson	Dave Hamelin; Rob Kinelski; Johan Lenox^{[c]}	2:47
9.	"Escape"	Larsson; Smith	Smith; Nowels	Nowels^{[p]}; Danja; Corona; Boissier^{[a]}; Fee^{[v]}; Smith^{[v]}	3:14
10.	"Soundtrack"	Larsson; Smith	Smith; Nowels	Nowels^{[p]}; Danja; Corona; Boissier^{[a]}; Fee^{[v]}; Smith^{[v]}	3:23
11.	"Venus"	Hannah Berney	Nowels; Berney	Nowels^{[p]}; Corona; Fee^{[p]}; Marroquin; Boissier^{[a]}	3:27
12.	"The Healing"	Berney	Nowels; Berney	Nowels^{[p]}; Boissier^{[a]}; Fee^{[v]}	3:10
Total length:					39:10

Notes

- ^{^[p]} signifies a primary and vocal producer.
- ^{^[c]} signifies a co-producer.
- ^{^[a]} signifies an additional producer.
- ^{^[v]} signifies a vocal producer.

== Personnel ==
Musicians

- Zara Larsson – lead vocals (all tracks), background vocals (tracks 1, 2, 4–11), vocal arrangement (7)
- MTHR – drums, keyboards, synthesizer (tracks 1, 5, 6); programming (1, 5), arrangement, guitar (1); bass (5, 6)
- Danja – drums (tracks 1, 2, 4–7), synthesizer (1, 5, 6), programming (1, 9), bass (2, 4, 7, 9), keyboards (2), percussion (2)
- Amanda Ibanez – background vocals (track 2)
- Jakob Hazell – bass, drums, keyboards, percussion (track 2)
- Svante Halldin – bass, drums, keyboards, percussion (track 2)
- Pierre-Luc Rioux – guitar (track 3)
- Timofey Reznikov – programming (track 3)
- Rick Nowels – acoustic guitar, piano (tracks 4, 9); keyboards (7, 10, 11), strings (7), bass (9, 10, 12), Mellotron (11)
- Starrah – background vocals (track 4)
- John Christopher Fee – percussion (tracks 4, 9, 10, 12), drum machine (4), drums (7, 9, 11), synthesizer (10); keyboards, programming (11)
- Austin Corona – keyboards (tracks 4, 7, 9, 11), drums (7, 9, 11), bass (7, 11), guitar (7, 9), programming (10)
- Patrick Warren – keyboards, synthesizer (tracks 4, 10); strings (7, 10, 11), Mellotron (10)
- Zac Rae – theremin (tracks 4, 11), keyboards (7, 9, 11), synthesizer (9, 11), strings (9, 12), piano (10, 12)
- Casey Smith – background vocals (tracks 7, 9), vocal arrangement (7)
- David Levita – guitar (tracks 7, 9, 11)
- Johan Lenox – piano, strings (track 8)
- Dave Hamelin – programming, synthesizer (track 8)
- Isaiah Gage – cello (track 8)
- Marta Honer – viola (track 8)
- Bianca McClure – violin (track 8)
- Nick Kennerly – violin (track 8)
- Yasmeen Al-Mazeedi – violin (track 8)
- Evan Sutton – keyboards (track 9)
- Violet Skies – background vocals (track 11)
- Dean Reid – bass (track 11)
- Wyatt Bernard – keyboards (track 11)

Technical

- Dave Kutch – mastering (tracks 1, 2, 4–11)
- Pierre-Luc Rioux – mastering (track 3)
- Rob Kinelski – mixing (tracks 1, 7, 8)
- Kevin "KD" Davis – mixing (tracks 2, 5, 6)
- Peppe Folliero – mixing (track 3)
- Timofey Reznikov – mixing (track 3)
- Manny Marroquin – mixing (tracks 4, 11)
- Dean Reid – mixing (tracks 9, 10, 12)
- John Christopher Fee – engineering (tracks 4, 7, 9–12)
- Evan Sutton – engineering (tracks 4, 9–11)
- Chris Rockwell – engineering (track 4)
- MTHR – engineering (track 5)
- Kieron Menzies – engineering (track 7)
- Marcella Araica –engineering (track 7)
- Different Sleep – vocal engineering (track 3)
- Eli Heisler – engineering assistance (track 7)

== Charts ==
=== Weekly charts ===
Weekly chart performance for Venus
Chart (2024 - 2025)	Peak position
Austrian Albums (Ö3 Austria)	63
Belgian Albums (Ultratop Flanders)	42
Belgian Albums (Ultratop Wallonia)	136
Dutch Albums (Album Top 100)	73
Finnish Albums (Suomen virallinen lista)	17
French Albums (SNEP)	85
German Albums (Offizielle Top 100)	71
Icelandic Albums (Tónlistinn)	37
Norwegian Albums (VG-lista)	4
Polish Albums (ZPAV)	98
Portuguese Albums (AFP)	118
Scottish Albums (Official Charts)	8
Spanish Albums (Promusicae)	76
Swedish Albums (Sverigetopplistan)	3
Swiss Albums (Schweizer Hitparade)	31
UK Albums (Official Charts)	15

=== Year-end charts ===
Year-end chart performance for Venus
Chart (2024)	Position
Swedish Albums (Sverigetopplistan)	23

== Certifications ==
Certifications for Venus
Region	Certification	Certified units/sales
Norway (IFPI Norway)	Platinum	20,000^{‡}
Sweden (GLF)	Gold	15,000^{‡}
^{‡} Sales+streaming figures based on certification alone.

== Release history ==
Release dates and formats for Venus
Region	Date	Format	Label	Ref.
Various	9 February 2024	CD; LP	Sommer House; Epic	
Various	9 February 2024	Digital download; streaming	Sommer House; Epic	
