= End of Time (Zara Larsson song) =

Single by Zara Larsson

from the album Venus
- Released: 19 May 2023
- Genre: Pop; synth-pop
- Length: 3:29
- Label: Sommer House; Epic
- Songwriters: Rick Nowels; Casey Smith
- Producers: Austin Corona; Danja; Rick Nowels

Zara Larsson singles chronology
"Can't Tame Her" (2023)	"End of Time" (2023)	"On My Love" (2023)

Music video
- "End of Time" on YouTube

"End of Time" is a song by Swedish singer and songwriter Zara Larsson. It was released as the second single from her fourth studio album, Venus (2024), on 19 May 2023 through Sommer House and Epic. It was written by Rick Nowels and Casey Smith, and produced by Austin Corona, Danja and Nowels. The song's music video followed the same day. The KUNGS remix was released on July 14, 2023.

== Composition and lyrics ==
A press release described the song as a "part symphonic power-ballad, part dystopian dance-banger" and as being inspired by "Loud-era Rihanna and ABBA". Larsson herself described the song as "danceable" and "pop" in an interview with Uproxx. Its lyrics refer to overcoming past trauma by finding strength in the present.

== Music video ==
The music video for End of Time was released on 19 May 2023 and was directed by the Baker Twins. Larsson referred to it as her "version of an eternal love story". In the video, she meets her younger self and "imparts some wisdom", which was described as "visual therapy" by Clash.

== Charts ==
=== Weekly charts ===
Weekly chart performance for "End of Time"
Chart (2023)	Peak position
Slovakia Airplay (ČNS IFPI)	67
South Korea BGM (Circle)	153
Sweden (Sverigetopplistan)	52

=== Monthly charts ===
Monthly chart performance for "End of Time"
Chart (2023)	Peak position
Slovakia (Rádio Top 100)	76

== Release history ==
Release history and formats for "End of Time"
Region	Date	Format(s)	Label	Ref.
Various	19 May 2023	Digital download; streaming	Sommer House	
