= HorsegiirL =

German DJ and singer (born 2000)

Background information
- Also known as: Stella Stallion
- Born: 20 April 2000 (age 26)
- Origin: Berlin, Germany
- Genres: Happy hardcore; UK hardcore
- Occupations: DJ; singer; songwriter
- Years active: 2022–present
- Labels: Live from Earth, RCA
- Website: horsegiirl.com

HorsegiirL (born 20 April 2000) is a German DJ, singer, and songwriter, known for wearing a horse head mask.

== Life and career ==
HorsegiirL hides her identity behind a chestnut-coloured horse head mask; Daniel Rodgers of Vogue wrote in November 2023 of being shackled by an "NDNeigh" to not ask "serious, journalistic questions about [her] provenance [or] distinct biological make-up", but noted that she was Berlin-based and that she had described herself as "half-horse, half-human". She told i-D in September 2023 that she uses the real name "Stella Stallion", grew up on "Sunshine Farms", and had gone from "making up [her] own melodies in [her] head when [she] was a young foal" to being "discovered by Whitney Horston at a harvest fest" as a teenager. She also told Rodgers that she had "been famous for a while" and that she had listened to the likes of Crazy Frog and Hampton the Hamster growing up. In addition, a February 2024 ABC News article described her as a "Black woman/horse/DJ", and of Mustang and Haflinger descent on her equine side.

Her debut single, "Harvest Heartbreak", features Baugruppe90, a duo composed of Louis Köhler and Paul Vogler. In 2022, she released "Farm Fantasies", and that December released "Pegasus", a futurepop song written about the day she first met her collaborator. She and MCR-T then re-released "My Barn My Rules" in January 2023, which became a popular sound on TikTok several months later, which had previously been a part of their collaborative "Farm Fantasies" EP released in 2022. She then released "Praise the Farm" as the lead single of her three-track "Farm Fatale" EP and contained songs about her leaving her farm and moving to a city. Charlie Hedges played "My Barn My Rules" during her 30 July 2023 episode of BBC Radio 1's Dance Anthems Ibiza, which attracted attention after Arielle Free, who was guesting on the programme, expressed her disapproval of the song on air, prompting Hedges to deactivate her microphone in annoyance. Radio 1 subsequently suspended Free from the station for a week. The success of "My Barn My Rules" prompted HorsegiirL to release a video for the single in September 2023; later that year, the song appeared on Dazed's "20 best tracks of 2023" list.

In October 2023, she released "F0rbiidden L0ve$tory", which interpolated Avril Lavigne's "Sk8er Boi" and was inspired by opinions of her parents' romance; the following December, she released "Wish ✮⋆˙", a Christmas song accompanied by a video. Struggling with the attention she was receiving, she went on holiday in Ecuador, staying near Cotopaxi, and attended an ayahuasca ceremony; after returning home, she released "Obsessed" in April 2024, which described infatuation, and was produced by A. G. Cook and Tom Demac.

In early 2026, HorsegiirL released the singles "An Apple a Day" and "Only the Best". With the release of her next single "Earth is Turning", she announced her upcoming debut album Nature Is Healing, inspired by her time in Ecuador. The fourth and final single "That's My Beach!" was released shortly before the album in June 2026. Nature is Healing includes production from A. G. Cook, Casey MQ, and Margo XS.

== Artistry ==
HorsegiirL refers to her fans as "farmies". In October 2023, Interview magazine described her musical style as happy hardcore, and in February 2024, Arielle Richards of Vice described "My Barn My Rules" as "yeehaw-meets-hardstyle" and a sample of a European set she had seen on TikTok as gabber. In addition, Shahzaib Hussain of Clash described "Obsessed" as a combination of "synthetic pop" and eurotrance. HorsegiirL told Rodgers that she took inspiration from the "extra-ness" of Lady Gaga, Dolly Parton, and "the heavy hardcore genre that rose from the Netherlands and Belgium".

== Discography ==
=== Studio albums ===
List of studio albums
Title	Album details
Nature Is Healing	Released: 5 June 2026; Label: RCA; Format: Digital download, streaming, LP, CD

=== Extended plays ===
List of extended plays
Title	Album details
v.i.p – very important pony	Released: 25 January 2025; Label: Three Six Zero Recordings; Format: Digital download, streaming

=== DJ Mix ===
List of dj mix
Title	DJ mix
NYE 2025 (DJ Mix)	Released: 16 december 2024; Label: Apple Music; Format: Digital download
horsegiirL at Movement Detroit 2025 (DJ Mix)	Released: 8 august 2025; Label: Format: Digital download
Club Mix 001: horsegiirL (DJ Mix)	Released: 17 June 2026; Label: Format: Digital download

=== Singles ===
Title	Year	Release details
"Harvest Heartbreak" (featuring Baugruppe90)	2022	Non-EP singles
"Starsiigns"	2022	Non-EP singles
"Pegasus"	2022	Non-EP singles
"Praise the Farm"	2023	Non-EP singles
"Farm Fatale"	2023	Non-EP singles
"F0rbiidden L0ve$tory"	2023	Non-EP singles
"Wish ✮⋆˙"	2023	Non-EP singles
"Obsessed"	2024	Non-EP singles
"Eat, Sleep, Slay, 🔁"	2024	v.i.p. – very important pony singles
"take it offff"	2024	v.i.p. – very important pony singles
"materiaL hor$e"	2025	Non-EP singles
"YOLO"	2025	Non-EP singles
"only the best"	2026	Nature Is Healing singles
"an apple a day"	2026	Nature Is Healing singles
"c*ntry girl rock"	2026	Non-EP single

==== As featured artist ====
Title	Year	Release details
"Farm Fantasies" (MCR-T featuring HorsegiirL)	2022	Non-EP single
"My Barn My Rules" (MCR-T featuring HorsegiirL)	2023	Non-EP single
"Farmcore" (Joost Klein featuring HorsegiirL)	2026	Kleinkunst
