= Pretty Ugly (song) =

2025 single by Zara Larsson

Single by Zara Larsson

from the album Midnight Sun
- Released: 25 April 2025
- Studio: Muzo
- Genre: Electroclash; pop
- Length: 2:39
- Label: Sommer House; Epic
- Songwriters: Helena Gao; Margo Wildman; Uzoechi Emenike; Zara Larsson
- Producers: Margo XS; MNEK

Zara Larsson singles chronology
"You Love Who You Love" (2024)	"Pretty Ugly" (2025)	"Midnight Sun" (2025)

Music video
- "Pretty Ugly" on YouTube

"Pretty Ugly" is a song by Swedish singer and songwriter Zara Larsson from her fifth studio album, Midnight Sun (2025). It was released as the album's lead single on 25 April 2025 through Sommer House and Epic Records. An electroclash and pop track that blends Eurodance and vintage pop elements, the song was written by Larsson, Helena Gao, MNEK, and Margo XS, with production handled by the latter two. It reached number fourteen in Sweden.

== Background and release ==
Larsson teased the single through social media and a Coachella-themed billboard. The release follows her previous album Venus, which debuted just over a year prior. She also supported Tate McRae on the Miss Possessive Tour beginning in August. In a 2023 interview with British GQ, she discussed her views on societal pressures related to female appearance, a theme reflected in her latest work. Larsson further explained that the song was written on the first day of working with MNEK, Margo XS, and Helena Gao, who served as core collaborators on the album. Larsson stated that the song was developed spontaneously through conversational exchanges, with some lyrics originating from improvised speech. The group sought to produce a track characterised by immediacy, energy, and intensity. The song was recorded at Muzo Studios.

== Composition ==
An electroclash and pop song, "Pretty Ugly" blends Eurodance with vintage pop elements. It also combines high-energy pop production with commentary on femininity and self-expression, featuring bold lyrics which addresses societal expectations placed on women, with Larsson rejecting the idea of appearing traditionally ladylike. The chorus explores themes of rebellion, messiness, and freedom from conventional beauty standards. Robin Murray of Clash described "Pretty Ugly" as a deliberate break from the constraints of Larsson's past work, channeling "chaotic main character energy" with brash, early 90s rave-inspired tones and a punk-like DIY edge. Murray also stated that the track rejects polish in favor of volatility, reflecting Larsson's embrace of unpredictability and creative freedom.

== Music video ==
The music video for "Pretty Ugly" was directed by Charlotte Rutherford. In the visual, Larsson arrives in a worn Volkswagen and emerges barefoot into a muddy field, where she joins a group of girls performing a cheer-inspired dance routine choreographed by Zoi Tatopoulos.

== Critical reception ==
Robin Murray of Clash praised "Pretty Ugly" as a powerful artistic statement from Zara Larsson, describing the song as her shedding past constraints and embracing unfiltered self-expression. He highlighted the track's rebellious tone, calling it "one of 2025's most potent pop manifestos" and spotlighted the lyric "Fuck the ladylike, more like crazy-like." The accompanying music video, directed by Charlotte Rutherford, was noted for its striking visuals. In contrast to the highly curated nature of contemporary pop, Larsson was commended for delivering "a dose of haywire thrills." Clash awarded the single a score of 8 out of 10.

== Charts ==
Weekly chart performance for the song
Chart (2025)	Peak position
Nicaragua Anglo Airplay (Monitor Latino)	8
Norway (VG-lista)	61
Sweden (Sverigetopplistan)	14

Weekly chart performance for the song (with JT and Margo XS)
Chart (2026)	Peak position
US Hot Dance/Pop Songs (Billboard)	14

== Release history ==
List of release dates and formats
Region	Date	Format(s)	Label(s)	Ref.
Various	25 April 2025	Digital download; streaming	Sommer House; Epic	
United States	5 May 2025	Contemporary hit radio	Epic	
