= Ngozi Esther Edeme =

Nigerian make-up artist

Ngozi Esther Edeme (born 1996 or 1997), also known as Painted by Esther, is a Nigerian makeup artist based in London. She gained prominence for her blush-centric makeup looks, including her work with public figures such as Naomi Campbell, SZA, Kelly Rowland, Olandria Carthen, and Adut Akech.

== Life and career ==
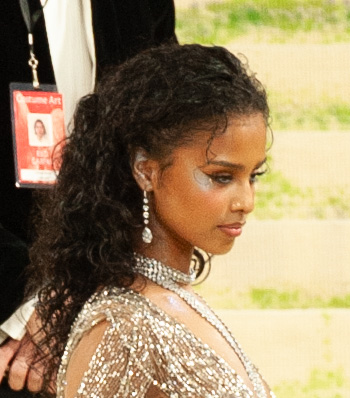
Edeme did the makeup of Tyla for the 2026 Met Gala.

Edeme was born and raised in Lagos, Nigeria. She moved to the United Kingdom at age eight and went on to study fine arts at university in North England. She resides in London.

Her first celebrity job was in 2018 as the makeup artist for Drake's tour DJ. She has done makeup looks for SZA, Kelly Rowland, Doechii, Tyla, Raye, Viola Davis, Cassie, and Nara Smith.

Edeme's signature style is characterized by saturated, gradient-styled blush. She has also received recognition for the use of this technique on models with darker skin tones, such as Adut Akech. In 2025 gained wider prominence with this style, described by Elle as "Barbie blush", during her work with Olandria in 2025.

Edeme received media coverage in 2026 when makeup artist Patrick Ta launched a line of makeup products titled "Transition Blurring Blush Duos". According to Allure, "Many people felt like Ta was ripping off Edeme's technique and capitalizing on it as his own, especially by trademarking the words 'transition blush' and by using words like 'created' to describe the technique." In response, Edeme said she did not create the technique: "That would be ludicrous to claim ownership of anything. But what you will not belittle is my influence".

Among her inspirations are Pat McGrath, Danessa Myricks, Sam Fine, Kevyn Aucoin's work with Naomi Campbell, and Scott Barnes.
