= Nature Is Healing =

Studio album by HorsegiirL
- Released: 5 June 2026
- Genres: Electropop; EDM; new age; jersey club; gabber; hyperpop
- Length: 51:59
- Label: RCA
- Producers: horsegiirL; A. G. Cook; Casey MQ; Margo XS; FREE Jimi; Elof Loelv; Suena; Luvhunter

HorsegiirL chronology
| v.i.p – very important pony (2025) | Nature Is Healing (2026) |

Singles from Nature Is Healing
- 1. "Only the Best" Released: 17 February 2026; 2. "An Apple a Day" Released: 20 March 2026; 3. "Earth is Turning" Released: 22 April 2026; 4. "That's My Beach!" Released: 2 June 2026

Nature Is Healing is the debut studio album by German DJ and singer-songwriter HorsegiirL, released on 5 June 2026 via RCA Records. The album was inspired by an ayahuasca ceremony she experienced during a four month period in Ecuador, with the album's concept being about the relations between humans and Earth. Elaborating on the album's themes, she said, "I want to remind human beings that they are part of nature… You are not looking at nature from the outside, but you are right in it".

The album has been described as fusing electropop, new age, EDM, jersey club, gabber, and hyperpop with samples of nature recordings. The album was produced by HorsegiirL, A. G. Cook, Casey MQ, Margo XS, FREE Jimi, Elof Loelv, Suena, and Luvhunter.

== Reception ==
In a positive Pitchfork review by Hattie Lindert, they stated that the album lived up to the eccentric persona HorsegiirL had built up to that point, believing the album to be both "silly and sincere". Further, taking note in a shift of sounds from previous releases by HorsegiirL, noting a departure from the hard dance stylings in favor of "electropop pastiche", as well as "80s new age, ’90s pop, and 2010s EDM." Overall, they believed that while the album might "disarm listeners most familiar with HorsegiirL’s cheeky humor", the album encourages imagination and "suspension of disbelief" with a rating of 7.3.

Alex Rigotti of NME gave the album a 4/5, highlighting HorsegiirL's range within "a string of surprisingly lush downtempo songs", similarly noting a contrast to the more upbeat music she had made prior. Further, praising the album for its diversity, noting individual songs covering genres such as tropical pop, house, and techno.

Professional ratings
Aggregate scores
| Source | Rating |
|---|---|
| Metacritic | 80/100 |
Review scores
| Source | Rating |
| Clash | 8/10 |
| NME | 4/5 stars |
| Pitchfork | 7.3/10 |
| Slant | 4/5 stars |

== Track listing ==
Nature Is Healing track listing
| No. | Title | Writer(s) | Producer(s) | Length |
|---|---|---|---|---|
| 1. | "351%" | Stella Stallion; Elof Loelv | HorsegiirL; Loelv; FREE JIMI; A. G. Cook^{[a]}; Nömak^{[a]}; Casey MQ^{[a]} | 1:07 |
| 2. | "That's My Beach!" | Stallion; Loelv | HorsegiirL; Luvhunter; Nömak; Margo XS | 3:18 |
| 3. | "Hands Hands Hands" | Stallion; Casey Manierka-Quaile | HorsegiirL; Casey MQ; Cook^{[a]}; Nömak^{[a]} | 3:24 |
| 4. | "Earth Is Turning" | Stallion; Lorenz Zentner | HorsegiirL; Luvhunter; Nömak^{[a]} | 4:49 |
| 5. | "Rivers Run Free" | Stallion; Alexander Cook | HorsegiirL; Nömak | 3:42 |
| 6. | "Aura" | Stallion | HorsegiirL; Nömak; Margo XS | 2:42 |
| 7. | "Fun Guy Fungi" | Stallion; Manierka-Quaile | HorsegiirL; Casey MQ; Nömak^{[a]} | 3:35 |
| 8. | "Nature Is Healing" | Stallion; Roman Klobe-Barangă; Manierka-Quaile | HorsegiirL; Casey MQ | 3:18 |
| 9. | "Only the Best" | Stallion; Manierka-Quaile | HorsegiirL; Casey MQ; Nömak^{[a]} | 3:21 |
| 10. | "Connect the Dots" | Stallion; Klobe-Barangă; Jennifer Allendörfer | HorsegiirL; Suena; Nömak^{[a]} | 3:17 |
| 11. | "An Apple a Day" | Stallion; Loelv; Jimi Eyrich | HorsegiirL; Loelv; FREE JIMI; Nömak^{[a]} | 5:16 |
| 12. | "Take Me to Venus" | Stallion; Toumani Diabate; Manierka-Quaile | HorsegiirL; Casey MQ; Nömak^{[a]}; Margo XS^{[a]}; Yves Nord^{[a]} | 3:10 |
| 13. | "Karma Is" | Stallion | HorsegiirL; Nömak; Nord | 1:50 |
| 14. | "Organic Intelligence (Oi)" | Stallion; Manierka-Quaile | HorsegiirL; Casey MQ; Nömak^{[a]} | 2:58 |
| 15. | "Music Goes On" | Stallion; Margo Wildman | HorsegiirL; MARGO XS; Nömak^{[a]} | 6:12 |
| Total length: | | | | 51:59 |

Notes

- ^{^[a]} signifies an additional producer
