= Midnight Sun Tour =

2025–2026 concert tour by Zara Larsson

- Tour by Zara Larsson
- Promotional poster
- Associated album: Midnight Sun
- Start date: 28 October 2025
- End date: 1 November 2026
- No. of shows: 100
- Supporting acts: Omar Rudberg; Amelia Moore; Inji; Eli; Cat & Calmell

Zara Larsson concert chronology
- Venus Tour (2024); Midnight Sun Tour (2025–2026)

The Midnight Sun Tour was the fifth concert tour by Swedish singer-songwriter Zara Larsson, in support of her fifth studio album, Midnight Sun (2025). The tour commenced on 28 October 2025, in Munich, Germany, and concluded on 1 November 2026, in Bangkok, Thailand. The tour featured 100 shows and visited five continents. It became Zara's biggest and most successful tour to date.

== Announcements ==
On 5 June 2025, Larsson announced the tour, with seventeen shows across Europe. Tickets went on sale eight days later, with an artist presale which ran for two days prior to the general sale dates. The European leg of the tour was held in several arenas, making it Larsson's biggest headlining tour to date. On 4 September, Omar Rudberg was announced as the opener for the European leg.

On 2 September 2025, Larsson announced a North American leg of the tour with Amelia Moore serving as the opening act. Presale tickets went on sale from 3 September, with the general sale starting on 5 September.

On 9 February 2026, Larsson announced an Australian leg of the tour. On 12 February, several new dates and venue upgrades were announced for the Australian leg of the tour following high demand. On 16 February, additional venue upgrades were announced for the Australian leg of the tour, as well as a new show in Auckland, New Zealand. On 19 February, a second show in Auckland, New Zealand was announced due to demand.

On 27 May 2026, Larsson announced an Asian leg of the tour. On 29 June, a second show in Seoul, South Korea as well as new shows in Quezon City, Philippines and Bangkok, Thailand were announced due to demand.

== Setlist ==
This set list is from the show on 31 July 2026 at Lollapalooza in Chicago. It is not intended to represent all concerts for the tour.

1. "Midnight Sun"
2. "Can't Tame Her"
3. "She Did It Again"
4. "I Would Like"/"Sundown" (medley)
5. "Hot & Sexy"
6. "Wow"
7. "Ain't My Fault"
8. "Pretty Ugly"
9. "Stateside + Zara Larsson"
10. "Eurosummer"
11. "Never Forget You"
12. "Lush Life"
13. "Symphony"
14. "Midnight Sun" (reprise)

== Tour dates ==
List of 2025 concerts
| Date (2025) | City | Country | Venue | Supporting acts |
|---|---|---|---|---|
| 28 October | Munich | Germany | Zenith | Omar Rudberg |
| 30 October | Vienna | Austria | Gasometer | Omar Rudberg |
| 31 October | Berlin | Germany | Tempodrom | Omar Rudberg |
| 2 November | Antwerp | Belgium | Lotto Arena | Omar Rudberg |
| 3 November | Paris | France | Salle Pleyel | Omar Rudberg |
| 5 November | London | England | Wembley Arena | Omar Rudberg |
| 7 November | Dublin | Ireland | 3Arena | Omar Rudberg |
| 9 November | Manchester | England | O_{2} Victoria Warehouse | Omar Rudberg |
| 11 November | Düsseldorf | Germany | Mitsubishi Electric Halle | Omar Rudberg |
| 12 November | Amsterdam | Netherlands | Ziggo Dome | Omar Rudberg |
| 16 November | Riga | Latvia | Xiaomi Arena | Omar Rudberg |
| 18 November | Copenhagen | Denmark | Royal Arena | Omar Rudberg |
| 19 November | Malmö | Sweden | Malmö Arena | Omar Rudberg |
| 21 November | Bærum (Note: Labeled as Oslo in promotional material) | Norway | Unity Arena | Omar Rudberg |
| 22 November | Gothenburg | Sweden | Scandinavium | Omar Rudberg |
| 26 November (Note: The venue was upgraded from Helsinki Ice Hall due to high demand.) | Helsinki | Finland | Veikkaus Arena | Omar Rudberg |
| 28 November | Stockholm | Sweden | Avicii Arena | Omar Rudberg |

List of 2026 concerts
| Date (2026) | City | Country | Venue | Supporting acts |
|---|---|---|---|---|
| 28 February | Portland | United States | Crystal Ballroom | Amelia Moore |
| 1 March | Seattle | United States | Showbox SoDo | Amelia Moore |
| 3 March | Oakland | United States | Fox Oakland Theatre | Amelia Moore |
| 4 March | Los Angeles | United States | The Wiltern | Amelia Moore |
| 5 March | Los Angeles | United States | The Wiltern | Amelia Moore |
| 7 March | Anaheim | United States | House of Blues | Amelia Moore |
| 8 March | Phoenix | United States | The Van Buren | Amelia Moore |
| 10 March | Salt Lake City | United States | The Union Event Center | Amelia Moore |
| 11 March (Note: The venue was upgraded from Summit Music Hall due to high demand.) | Denver | United States | Fillmore Auditorium | Amelia Moore |
| 13 March | Minneapolis | United States | The Fillmore | Amelia Moore |
| 14 March | Milwaukee | United States | The Rave | Amelia Moore |
| 15 March | Chicago | United States | Riviera Theatre | Amelia Moore |
| 17 March (Note: The venue was upgraded from Majestic Theatre due to high demand.) | Michigan (Note: Labeled as Detroit in promotion material) | United States | Royal Oak Music Theatre | Amelia Moore |
| 18 March | Indianapolis | United States | Old National Centre | Amelia Moore |
| 20 March | Cleveland | United States | Agora Theatre and Ballroom | Amelia Moore |
| 21 March | Columbus | United States | KEMBA Live! | Amelia Moore |
| 22 March | Pittsburgh | United States | Stage AE | Amelia Moore |
| 24 March | Toronto | Canada | History | Amelia Moore |
| 26 March | Brooklyn | United States | Brooklyn Paramount | Amelia Moore |
| 27 March | Brooklyn | United States | Brooklyn Paramount | Amelia Moore |
| 28 March | Boston | United States | House of Blues | Amelia Moore |
| 30 March | Philadelphia | United States | The Fillmore | Amelia Moore |
| 31 March | Washington D.C. | United States | The Anthem | Amelia Moore |
| 1 April | Charlotte | United States | The Fillmore | Amelia Moore |
| 3 April | Raleigh | United States | The Ritz | Amelia Moore |
| 4 April | Nashville | United States | Marathon Music Works | Amelia Moore |
| 5 April | Atlanta | United States | Tabernacle | Amelia Moore |
| 7 April (Note: The venue was upgraded from Revolution Live due to high demand.) | Miami Beach | United States | The Fillmore | Amelia Moore |
| 8 April | Lake Buena Vista (Note: Labeled as Orlando in promotional material) | United States | House of Blues | Amelia Moore |
| 10 April | Austin | United States | Stubb’s Waller Creek Amphitheater | Amelia Moore |
| 11 April | Dallas | United States | The Bomb Factory | Amelia Moore |
| 12 April (Note: The venue was upgraded from House of Blues due to high demand.) | Houston | United States | Bayou Music Center | Amelia Moore |
| 17 May (Note: This concert is part of Tecate Emblema.) | Mexico City | Mexico | Autódromo Hermanos Rodríguez | —N/a |
| 23 May (Note: This concert is part of BBC Radio 1's Big Weekend.) | Sunderland | England | Herrington Country Park | —N/a |
| 5 June (Note: This concert is part of Vaulen Open Air.) | Stavanger | Norway | Vaulen Beach | —N/a |
| 6 June (Note: This concert is part of NEON Festival.) | Trondheim | Norway | Ladesletta | —N/a |
| 19 June (Note: This concert is part of Pinkpop Festival.) | Landgraaf | Netherlands | Megaland | —N/a |
| 21 June (Note: This concert is part of Parklife.) | Manchester | England | Heaton Park | —N/a |
| 28 June (Note: This concert is part of Open Air St. Gallen.) | St. Gallen | Switzerland | Sitterbühne | —N/a |
| 1 July (Note: This concert is part of Open'er Festival.) | Gdynia | Poland | Gdynia-Kosakowo Airport | —N/a |
| 4 July (Note: This concert is part of Roskilde Festival.) | Roskilde | Denmark | Roskilde Dyreskueplads | —N/a |
| 9 July (Note: This concert is part of Mad Cool.) | Madrid | Spain | Iberdrola Music | —N/a |
| 10 July (Note: This concert is part of NOS Alive.) | Lisbon | Portugal | Passeio Marítimo de Algés | —N/a |
| 12 July (Note: This concert is part of Montreux Jazz Festival.) | Montreux | Switzerland | Auditorium Stravinski | —N/a |
| 18 July (Note: This concert is part of Lollapalooza Germany.) | Berlin | Germany | Olympiapark | —N/a |
| 30 July (Note: This concert is part of Lollapalooza Aftershow.) | Chicago | United States | Grant Park | —N/a |
| 31 July (Note: This concert is part of Lollapalooza.) | Chicago | United States | Grant Park | —N/a |
| 2 August (Note: This concert is part of Osheaga Festival.) | Montreal | Canada | Jean-Drapeau Park | —N/a |
| 7 August (Note: This concert is part of Untold Festival.) | Cluj-Napoca (Note: Labeled as Transylvania in promotional material) | Romania | Cluj Arena | —N/a |
| 9 August (Note: This concert is part of Pozitif Vibrations.) | Istanbul | Turkey | Bonus Parkorman | Inji |
| 11 August (Note: This concert is part of Sziget Festival.) | Budapest | Hungary | Óbudai-Sziget | —N/a |
| 13 August (Note: This concert is part of Way Out West.) | Gothenburg | Sweden | Slottsskogen Park | —N/a |
| 14 August (Note: This concert is part of Flow Festival.) | Helsinki | Finland | Suvilahti | —N/a |
| 20 August (Note: This concert is part of FM4 Frequency Festival.) | St. Pölten | Austria | Green Park | —N/a |
| 22 August (Note: This concert is part of All Points East.) | London | England | Victoria Park | —N/a |
| 23 August (Note: This concert is part of Pukkelpop.) | Hasselt | Belgium | Pukkelpop | —N/a |
| 25 August (Note: This concert is part of Edinburgh Summer Sessions.) | Edinburgh | Scotland | Royal Highland Showgrounds | —N/a |
| 28 August (Note: The 28 August and 29 August 2026, concerts are part of Electric Picnic.) | Stradbally | Ireland | Stradbally Hall | —N/a |
| 29 August | Stradbally | Ireland | Stradbally Hall | —N/a |
| 30 August (Note: This concert is part of Superbloom Festival.) | Munich | Germany | Olympiapark | —N/a |
| 13 September (Note: This concert is part of Rock in Rio.) | Rio de Janeiro | Brazil | City of Rock | —N/a |
| 18 September (Note: This concert is part of iHeartRadio Music Festival.) | Paradise (Note: Labeled as Las Vegas in promotional material) | United States | T-Mobile Arena | —N/a |
| 26 September (Note: This concert is part of All Things Go Music Festival.) | Columbia (Note: Labeled as Washington D.C. in promotional material) | United States | Merriweather Post Pavilion | —N/a |
| 27 September (Note: This concert is part of Portola Music Festival.) | San Francisco | United States | Pier 80 | —N/a |
| 29 September | Los Angeles | United States | Greek Theatre | Eli |
| 30 September | Los Angeles | United States | Greek Theatre | Eli |
| 4 October | Seoul | South Korea | Myunghwa Live Hall | —N/a |
| 5 October | Seoul | South Korea | Myunghwa Live Hall | —N/a |
| 7 October | Tokyo | Japan | The Garden Hall | —N/a |
| 8 October | Tokyo | Japan | The Garden Hall | —N/a |
| 10 October (Note: The concert is part of the Singapore Grand Prix.) | Singapore | Singapore | Marina Bay Street Circuit | —N/a |
| 13 October | Brisbane | Australia | Riverstage | Cat & Calmell |
| 14 October | Brisbane | Australia | Riverstage | Cat & Calmell |
| 15 October | Sydney | Australia | Hordern Pavilion | Cat & Calmell |
| 17 October | Melbourne | Australia | Margaret Court Arena | Cat & Calmell |
| 18 October (Note: The venue was upgraded from Adelaide Entertainment Centre Theatre due to high demand.) | Adelaide | Australia | Adelaide Entertainment Centre Arena | Cat & Calmell |
| 20 October (Note: The venue was upgraded from Perth HPC due to high demand.) | Perth | Australia | RAC Arena | Cat & Calmell |
| 22 October (Note: The venue was upgraded from Margaret Court Arena due to high demand.) | Melbourne | Australia | Rod Laver Arena | Cat & Calmell |
| 23 October (Note: The venue was upgraded from Hordern Pavilion due to high demand.) | Sydney | Australia | Afterpay Arena | Cat & Calmell |
| 25 October | Auckland | New Zealand | Spark Arena | Cat & Calmell |
| 26 October | Auckland | New Zealand | Spark Arena | Cat & Calmell |
| 30 October | Quezon City (Note: Labeled as Manila in promotional material) | Philippines | Araneta Coliseum | —N/a |
| 1 November | Bangkok | Thailand | UOB Live | —N/a |

=== Cancelled shows ===
List of cancelled concerts, showing date, city, country, venue, and reason for cancellation
| Date (2026) | City | Country | Venue | Reason |
|---|---|---|---|---|
| 27 June (Note: This concert was supposed to be a part of Solidays.) | Paris | France | Longchamp Racecourse | 2026 European heatwaves |
| 25 September (Note: This concert was supposed to be part of All Things Go NYC Music Festival.) | Queens | New York | Forest Hills Stadium | Severe weather conditions |
| 3 December (Note: This concert was supposed to be part of the Abu Dhabi Grand Prix.) | Abu Dhabi | United Arab Emirates | Etihad Live | Personal value system |
