= Crush (Zara Larsson song) =

2025 single by Zara Larsson

Single by Zara Larsson

from the album Midnight Sun
- B-side: "Hot & Sexy"
- Released: 15 August 2025
- Studio: Just for the Record
- Genre: Pop
- Length: 2:58
- Label: Sommer House; Epic
- Songwriters: Zara Larsson; Helena Gao; Uzoechi Emenike; Margo Wildman
- Producers: Zhone; Margo XS

Zara Larsson singles chronology
| "Midnight Sun" (2025) | "Crush" (2025) | "Stateside + Zara Larsson" (2026) |

Music video
- "Crush" on YouTube

"Crush" is a song by Swedish singer and songwriter Zara Larsson from her fifth studio album, Midnight Sun (2025). It was released as the album's third single on 15 August 2025, through Sommer House and Epic Records. The song was produced by Zhone and Margo XS; the latter wrote it along with Larsson, Helena Gao and Uzoechi Emenike. A pop track, "Crush" was sent to US radio station after four days of its official release.

== Background and recording ==
Larsson released the single "Crush" as the latest preview of her fifth studio album, Midnight Sun. Recorded at Just for the Record, the track was written with Helena Gao and produced by Margo XS alongside Larsson's longtime collaborator MNEK. "Crush" follows the album's title track, "Midnight Sun", which came with a Charlotte Rutherford-directed Y2K-inspired video.

Released as Larsson continued her North American run with Tate McRae, the single also preceded her upcoming European headline tour and further Australasian dates with OneRepublic. Larsson released the track along with "Hot & Sexy" in 7" vinyl single on 13 February 2026, exclusively through Urban Outfitters.

== Composition ==
Lyrically, "Crush" explores the conflict of developing feelings for someone new while already being in a stable relationship. In the percussive pop track, Larsson sings about experiencing a new infatuation that she describes as a "fantasy" interfering with her existing relationship. The lyrics reflect the tension between excitement and the recognition that it could disrupt what she already has, while also acknowledging the emotional impact of the situation. According to Contactmusic.com, the song starts with subdued instrumentation and a "shuffling" beat before developing into a more insistent rhythmic drive, while the lyrics address the singer's conflict between temptation and loyalty.

== Commercial performance ==
"Crush" peaked at number 32 in Sweden and number 56 in Norway, while also reaching number 34 on the New Zealand Hot Singles chart. In the United States, the song topped the Dance/Mix Show Airplay chart, reaching number 11 on the Hot Dance/Pop Songs and number 17 on the Pop Airplay.

== Personnel ==
Credits were adapted from Tidal.

- Zara Larsson – lead vocal, songwriter, associated performer, background vocal
- Zhone – producer, drums, keyboards, programmer
- Helena Gao – songwriter
- Kevin Hickey – songwriter
- Margo Wildman – songwriter, producer
- Uzoechi Osisioma Emenike – songwriter
- Kaelen Russel – engineer
- Randy Merrill – mastering engineer
- Tom Norris – mixing engineer
- Troy Taylor – vocal producer

== Charts ==
=== Weekly charts ===
Weekly chart performance
| Chart (2025) | Peak position |
|---|---|
| Central America Anglo Airplay (Monitor Latino) | 12 |
| Estonia Airplay (TopHit) | 19 |
| Latvia Airplay (TopHit) | 7 |
| Lithuania Airplay (TopHit) | 7 |
| New Zealand Hot Singles (RMNZ) | 34 |
| Nicaragua Airplay (Monitor Latino) | 13 |
| Norway (VG-lista) | 56 |
| Sweden (Sverigetopplistan) | 32 |
| US Dance Airplay (Billboard) | 1 |
| US Hot Dance/Pop Songs (Billboard) | 11 |
| US Pop Airplay (Billboard) | 17 |
| Venezuela Anglo Airplay (Monitor Latino) | 4 |

=== Monthly charts ===
Monthly chart performance
| Chart (2025) | Peak position |
|---|---|
| Estonia Airplay (TopHit) | 28 |
| Latvia Airplay (TopHit) | 15 |
| Lithuania Airplay (TopHit) | 18 |

=== Year-end charts ===
2025 year-end chart performance
| Chart (2025) | Position |
|---|---|
| Estonia Airplay (TopHit) | 126 |
| Latvia Airplay (TopHit) | 163 |

== Release history ==
List of release dates and formats
| Region | Date | Format(s) | Label(s) | Ref. |
|---|---|---|---|---|
| Various | 15 August 2025 | Digital download; streaming | Sommer House; Epic | |
| United States | 19 August 2025 | Contemporary hit radio | Epic | |
| United States | 13 February 2026 | 7-inch vinyl | Sommer House; Epic | |
