= On My Love =

Single by Zara Larsson and David Guetta

from the album Venus
- Released: 15 September 2023
- Genre: EDM; dance-pop
- Length: 3:42
- Label: Sommer House; Epic
- Songwriters: Andre Davidson; Castle; David Guetta; Dewain Whitmore Jr.; Giorgio Tuinfort; Patrick Smith; Sean Davidson; Zara Larsson
- Producers: David Guetta; Giorgio Tuinfort; Cesqeaux

Zara Larsson singles chronology
"End of Time" (2023)	"On My Love" (2023)	"Memory Lane" (2023)

David Guetta singles chronology
"One in a Million" (2023)	"On My Love" (2023)	"Big FU" (2023)

Music video
- "On My Love" on YouTube

"On My Love" is a song by Swedish singer Zara Larsson and French DJ and record producer David Guetta. It was released as the third single from Larsson's fourth studio album, Venus (2024), on 15 September 2023 through Sommer House and Epic. It follows their first collaboration "This One's for You" (2016), the official UEFA Euro 2016 song. The song reached the top three in Latvia and Sweden and the top ten in Norway and the Czech Republic.

== Background and composition ==
On 7 September 2023, Larsson announced the song through her social media. The singer revealed that the track is about relationships in your life that would make you "put everything on them". Leaving open the fact whether it talks about a "platonic relationship", the love to a family member or a lover, it revolves around someone that brings "pure joy". Upon release, Larsson dedicated the song to her sister Hanna. "On My Love" was described as an "Ibiza-ready anthem tinged with Swedish melancholy".

It is composed in a key of B-flat minor and has a tempo of 123 beats per minute.

== Music video ==
An accompanying music video, directed by duo Mutant and co-directed by Larsson herself, was released on 15 September and constitutes an "ode" to the close relationship Larsson shares with her sister. The video starts out with a young Larsson introducing her sister who then appears wearing a cycling helmet. The visuals later move to the present day and feature the sisters riding motorbikes and going for a swim with friends.

== Charts ==
=== Weekly charts ===
Weekly chart performance for "On My Love"
Chart (2023–2024)	Peak position
Czech Republic Airplay (ČNS IFPI)	6
Estonia Airplay (TopHit)	3
Finnish Airplay (Radiosoittolista)	32
France (SNEP)	44
Germany (GfK)	80
Global Excl. US (Billboard)	189
Hungary (Editors' Choice Top 40)	36
Ireland (IRMA)	15
Japan Hot Overseas (Billboard Japan)	17
Latvia (EHR)	2
Lithuania Airplay (TopHit)	11
Netherlands (Single Top 100)	75
Netherlands (Tipparade)	12
New Zealand Hot Singles (RMNZ)	12
Norway (VG-lista)	9
Slovakia Airplay (ČNS IFPI)	39
Sweden (Sverigetopplistan)	3
Switzerland (Schweizer Hitparade)	56
UK Singles (Official Charts)	15
UK Dance (Official Charts)	6
US Dance Airplay (Billboard)	2
US Hot Dance/Electronic Songs (Billboard)	22
US Pop Airplay (Billboard)	34
Venezuela (Record Report)	64

=== Monthly charts ===
Monthly chart performance for "On My Love"
Chart (2023–2024)	Peak position
Czech Republic (Rádio Top 100)	8
Estonia Airplay (TopHit)	3
Slovakia (Rádio Top 100)	45

=== Year-end charts ===
2024 year-end chart performance for "On My Love"
Chart (2024)	Position
Estonia Airplay (TopHit)	166
US Hot Dance/Electronic Songs (Billboard)	95

== Certifications ==
Certifications for "On My Love"
Region	Certification	Certified units/sales
Denmark (IFPI Danmark)	Gold	45,000^{‡}
France (SNEP)	Platinum	200,000^{‡}
Norway (IFPI Norway)	Platinum	60,000^{‡}
United Kingdom (BPI)	Platinum	600,000^{‡}
Streaming
Sweden (GLF)	Gold	4,000,000^{†}
^{‡} Sales+streaming figures based on certification alone.^{†} Streaming-only figures based on certification alone.

== Release history ==
Release dates and formats for "On My Love"
Region	Date	Format	Label(s)	Ref.
United States	26 September 2023	Contemporary hit radio	Epic	
