= Margo XS =

American DJ and record producer

- Born: Margo Wildman; Michigan, U.S.A.
- Occupations: DJ; record producer
- Years active: 2021–present

Margo Wildman, known professionally as Margo XS, is an American DJ and record producer. She is best known for her production work for Zara Larsson, Kim Petras, Demi Lovato, Chuu, and Alice Longyu Gao. She is one-half of the electropunk duo deBasement. In 2026, she received a Grammy Award nomination for Best Dance Pop Recording for producing Larsson's "Midnight Sun".

== Career ==
Margo XS was born and grew up in Michigan. She began learning guitar at the age of seven and later started producing songs on GarageBand during her teenage years. While studying at a university in Montreal, she became involved in the city's queer rave scene.

In 2024, she formed an electropunk duo, deBasement, alongside the frontperson of Special Interest, Alli Logout. They released their debut maxi single "Front Left Speaker" / "FTDJ (Thank God)". In 2025, she worked on the majority of Zara Larsson's fifth studio album Midnight Sun. Speaking to Dazed, Larsson said that Margo helped shape the album's sound, song structures, and instrumentation, adding that it "could only be what it is thanks to Margo". In 2026, she received a Grammy Award nomination for Best Dance Pop Recording for her production work on Larsson's "Midnight Sun". She appeared as a featured artist alongside JT on "Pretty Ugly" from Larsson's remix album Midnight Sun: Girls Trip.

== Personal life ==
She is a trans woman.

== Discography ==
=== Remixes ===
Song	Year	Artist	Album	Title
"Stay Away"	2022	Ravenna Golden	Non-album singles	Margo XS Edition
"Gateaux"	2023	C'est Karma	Non-album singles	Glazed Remix
"Chemistry"	2024	Bébe Yana	The Rmxs: Vol. 1	Margo XS Remix
"Somebody Else's Baby"	2024	Gia Woods	Your Engine (Remix Pack)	Remix
"You Could Hate Me"	2025	Sophia Stel	Object Permanence (Deluxe Edition)	Margo XS Remix
"Pretty Ugly" (with JT)	2026	Zara Larsson	Midnight Sun: Girls Trip	Girls Trip

=== Production discography ===
Song	Year	Artist	Album
"Token"	2021	Roma Radz	Non-album singles
"FBP (Female Brad Pitt)"	2021	Maryze	Non-album singles
"Luke Blovad"	2022	Luke Blovad	Non-album singles
"Celebrity"	2022	Luke Blovad	Non-album singles
"Ready"	2023	Swank Mami	Eurostar
"Yesterday"	2023	Harmony Tividad	Non-album single
"I Am So Lucky and Nothing Can Stop Me"	2023	Harmony Tividad	Dystopia Girl
"On My Own"	2023	Ravenna Golden	Non-album single
"Daydreamer"	2024	Chuu	Strawberry Rush
"Clingy"	2024	Alice Longyu Gao	Assembling Symbols Into My Own Poetry
"Lesbians <3"	2024	Alice Longyu Gao	Assembling Symbols Into My Own Poetry
"Conspiracy"	2024	Terror Jr	Non-album singles
"Wet"	2024	Mowalola and Deto Black	Non-album singles
"Not There Anymore"	2024	Ravenna Golden	Non-album singles
"90s_madonna"	2024	SliccMic	Non-album singles
"Is There Anyone Out There?"	2024	Betta Lemme	Good Mourning
"Polo"	2025	Kim Petras	Detour
"Freak It"	2025	Kim Petras	Detour
"I Like Ur Look"	2025	Kim Petras	Detour
"Midnight Sun"	2025	Zara Larsson	Midnight Sun
"Blue Moon"	2025	Zara Larsson	Midnight Sun
"Pretty Ugly"	2025	Zara Larsson	Midnight Sun
"Crush"	2025	Zara Larsson	Midnight Sun
"Eurosummer"	2025	Zara Larsson	Midnight Sun
"Hot & Sexy"	2025	Zara Larsson	Midnight Sun
"The Ambition"	2025	Zara Larsson	Midnight Sun
"Saturn's Return"	2025	Zara Larsson	Midnight Sun
"Puss Puss"	2025	Zara Larsson	Midnight Sun
"I'm a Mess"	2025	Godly the Ruler	The Subtle Art of Getting By
"Need for Speed"	2026	Kim Petras	Detour
"DTLA"	2026	Kim Petras	Detour
"101"	2026	Kim Petras	Detour
"Basketball"	2026	Kim Petras	Detour
"Bitch Ball Out"	2026	Kim Petras	Detour
"Korea"	2026	Kim Petras	Detour
"Pop Sound"	2026	Kim Petras	Pretour
"Mr. Producer" (featuring BC Kingdom)	2026	Kim Petras	Pretour
"Get Some" (featuring Cortisa Star)	2026	Kim Petras	Pretour
"Like a Cherry"	2026	Kim Petras	Detour (Rare n' Deluxe)
"Rare n' Deluxe"	2026	Kim Petras	Detour (Rare n' Deluxe)
"What a Night"	2026	Kim Petras	Detour (Rare n' Deluxe)
"Autobahn"	2026	Kim Petras	Detour (Rare n' Deluxe)
"Nothing On but the Lights"	2026	Demi Lovato	It's Not That Deep (Unless You Want It to Be)
"Talk to Me, Zara"	2026	Robyn and Zara Larsson	Non-album single
"That's My Beach!"	2026	HorsegiirL	Nature Is Healing
"Aura"	2026	HorsegiirL	Nature Is Healing
"Take Me to Venus"	2026	HorsegiirL	Nature Is Healing
"Music Goes On"	2026	HorsegiirL	Nature Is Healing
"Glow Motion"	2026	Ive	Looks Can Kill
