= Can't Tame Her =

Single by Zara Larsson

from the album Venus
- Released: 26 January 2023
- Genre: Synth-pop; new wave; dance-pop; pop
- Length: 3:17
- Label: Sommer House; Epic
- Songwriters: Zara Larsson; Uzoechi Osisioma "Uzo" Emenike; Karl Ivert; Kian Sang
- Producer: MTHR

Zara Larsson singles chronology
"Words" (2022)	"Can't Tame Her" (2023)	"End of Time" (2023)

Music videos
- "Can't Tame Her" on YouTube; "Can't Tame Her" (Alternate cut) on YouTube

"Can't Tame Her" is a song by Swedish singer and songwriter Zara Larsson. It was released as the lead single from her fourth studio album, Venus (2024), on 26 January 2023 through Sommer House and Epic. It was written by Larsson, MNEK, Karl Ivert and Kian Sang, and produced by the Swedish duo MTHR (Ivert and Sang). The song has been certified gold in the United Kingdom and Denmark, and platinum in Sweden. It received widespread critical acclaim from music critics, who praised the sound, production, lyrics and Larsson's vocal performance.

== Background and promotion ==
Beginning in December 2022, Larsson posted snippets of the song on her TikTok and Twitter accounts, with the Official Charts Company calling the song an "effervescent 80s synth banger" that sounds "like a brilliant mash-up of The Weeknd's mammoth hit 'Blinding Lights' and Ava Max's overlooked rammer 'Maybe You're the Problem'". Larsson officially announced the song and its release date on 12 January 2023 through her social media accounts.

Larsson performed the song live for the first time on 27 January at the Swedish award show P3 Guld.

The song also appears in Just Dance 2024 Edition with the routine performed by Just Dance Twitch streamer littlesiha. Larsson acknowledged the game's routine to the song and with Larsson finding out through littlesiha's behind the scenes videos that the dances performed in game are done by real people.

== Composition and lyrics ==
"Can't Tame Her" is primarily propelled forward by 1980s-inspired synths. In an interview with Billboard, Larsson said that the song was "definitely pop" and a "banger that hits you right in the face".

The lyrics of "Can't Tame Her" describe an independent, fun-loving woman who does what she wants. Larsson said that the song was inspired by the public's perception of celebrities, and how they confine celebrities to certain ways of behaviour.

== Music video ==
The music video was released alongside the song on 26 January 2023. The music video shows Larsson in a "face-off with her wild side", and was shot in Prague.

== Charts ==
=== Weekly charts ===
Weekly chart performance for "Can't Tame Her"
Chart (2023–2024)	Peak position
Bulgaria Airplay (PROPHON)	1
Canada CHR/Top 40 (Billboard)	48
CIS Airplay (TopHit) Nightcore Remix	77
Croatia International Airplay (Top lista)	23
Czech Republic Airplay (ČNS IFPI)	4
Denmark (Tracklisten)	25
Estonia Airplay (TopHit)	10
Estonia Airplay (TopHit) Nightcore Remix	2
Finland (Suomen virallinen lista)	39
Germany Airplay (BVMI)	5
Hungary (Dance Top 40)	13
Hungary (Rádiós Top 40)	1
Ireland (IRMA)	36
Latvia Airplay (LaIPA)	16
Lithuania Airplay (TopHit) Nightcore Remix	49
Netherlands (Single Tip)	17
Norway (VG-lista)	7
Poland (Polish Airplay Top 100)	49
Slovakia Airplay (ČNS IFPI)	14
Sweden (Sverigetopplistan)	5
UK Singles (Official Charts)	25
US Dance Airplay (Billboard)	1
US Pop Airplay (Billboard)	28

2026 weekly chart performance
Chart (2026)	Peak position
Norway Airplay (IFPI Norge)	57

=== Monthly charts ===
Monthly chart performance for "Can't Tame Her"
Chart (2023)	Peak position
CIS Airplay (TopHit) Nightcore Remix	95
Czech Republic (Rádio – Top 100)	9
Estonia Airplay (TopHit) Nightcore Remix	3
Lithuania Airplay (TopHit) Nightcore Remix	60
Slovakia (Rádio – Top 100)	20

=== Year-end charts ===
2023 year-end chart performance for "Can't Tame Her"
Chart (2023)	Position
Bulgaria Airplay (PROPHON)	2
Denmark (Tracklisten)	46
Estonia Airplay (TopHit)	68
Estonia Airplay (TopHit) Nightcore Remix	73
Hungary (Rádiós Top 40)	30
Sweden (Sverigetopplistan)	5

2024 year-end chart performance for "Can't Tame Her"
Chart (2024)	Position
Hungary (Dance Top 40)	57
Hungary (Rádiós Top 40)	4

2025 year-end chart performance for "Can't Tame Her"
Chart (2025)	Position
Hungary (Dance Top 40)	59
Hungary (Rádiós Top 40)	11

== Certifications ==
Certifications for "Can't Tame Her"
Region	Certification	Certified units/sales
Austria (IFPI Austria)	Gold	15,000^{‡}
Denmark (IFPI Danmark)	Platinum	90,000^{‡}
Hungary (MAHASZ)	3× Platinum	12,000^{‡}
Norway (IFPI Norway)	2× Platinum	120,000^{‡}
Poland (ZPAV)	Gold	25,000^{‡}
Switzerland (IFPI Switzerland)	Gold	10,000^{‡}
United Kingdom (BPI)	Platinum	600,000^{‡}
Streaming
Sweden (GLF)	Platinum	8,000,000^{†}
^{‡} Sales+streaming figures based on certification alone.^{†} Streaming-only figures based on certification alone.

== Release history ==
Release history and formats for "Can't Tame Her"
Region	Date	Format(s)	Label	Ref.
Various	26 January 2023	Digital download; streaming	Sommer House	
United Kingdom	3 March 2023	CD	Epic	
United States	17 April 2023	Hot adult contemporary	Epic	

== See also ==
- List of Billboard number-one dance songs of 2023
