= Midnight Sun (Zara Larsson song) =

2025 single by Zara Larsson

Single by Zara Larsson

from the album Midnight Sun
- B-side: "Lush Life"
- Written: 2024
- Released: 13 June 2025
- Studio: Muzo
- Genre: Electropop; drum and bass; hyperpop; Jersey club
- Length: 3:11
- Label: Sommer House; Epic
- Songwriters: Helena Gao; Uzoechi Emenike; Zara Larsson
- Producers: Margo XS; MNEK

Zara Larsson singles chronology
"Pretty Ugly" (2025)	"Midnight Sun" (2025)	"Crush" (2025)

Music video
- "Midnight Sun" on YouTube

"Midnight Sun" is a song by Swedish singer and songwriter Zara Larsson from her fifth studio album of the same name (2025). It was released as the album's second single on 13 June 2025 through Sommer House and Epic Records. Described as a drum and bass, electropop, hyperpop, and Jersey club track, the song was written by Helena Gao, MNEK and Larsson. The song peaked at number four in Sweden, becoming her twentieth top ten entry in her home country. Elsewhere, it also reached the top 10 in Canada and the United Kingdom, the top 15 in the United States, the top 20 in Ireland, New Zealand, and the Netherlands, and the top 40 in Australia, Norway, and on the Billboard Global 200.

At the 68th Annual Grammy Awards, the song was nominated for Best Dance Pop Recording, becoming Larsson's first Grammy nomination. A remix version of the song with American singer Muni Long was released on 14 November 2025, while a remix featuring British singer-songwriter PinkPantheress was released on 1 May 2026 as part of the Midnight Sun: Girls Trip remix album.

== Background ==
Larsson described the concept behind the album as inspired by her Swedish roots, particularly the feeling of a summer that never ends. She stated, "I really am proud of my Swedish pop heritage, so I wanted to write about a Swedish summer where the sun never goes down. I wanted the whole album to feel like it's a summer night and it never ends. And it doesn't matter if it's December: the summer night will be there for you. It's waiting for you, it will come back for you, and you will come back for it". The song was recorded at Muzo Studios.

== Composition ==
"Midnight Sun" blends elements of drum and bass, house, trance, and EDM, characterized by energetic breakbeats, atmospheric synths, and expansive pop production. Critics have described it as a drum-and-bass, electro-pop, hyperpop, and Jersey club song. Rolling Stone depicted it as "teetering between ebullient and delirious", highlighting its dynamic instrumentation and Larsson's vibrant vocal performance.

== Commercial performance ==
In Sweden, "Midnight Sun" debuted at number 46 on the Sverigetopplistan chart for the week dated 20 June 2025, and later peaked at number four on the chart for the week dated 21 November. It has spent 47 weeks on the chart as of 12 May 2026. In the United Kingdom, the song debuted at number 91 on the UK Singles Chart for the week ending 8 January 2026. It gradually climbed the chart, initially peaking at number 12 for the week ending 16 April. Following the release of the "Midnight Sun" remix featuring PinkPantheress from the Midnight Sun: Girls Trip (2026) album, the original version of "Midnight Sun" reached a new peak position of number seven on the UK Singles Chart, becoming Larsson's first solo top ten entry since "Ruin My Life" (2018).

In the United States, "Midnight Sun" debuted at number 81 on the Billboard Hot 100 for the chart week dated 31 January 2026. It later peaked at number 12 on the chart week dated 24 October 2026, becoming her highest charting solo song on the chart, surpassing "Lush Life" (2015), which peaked at number 35. On the Billboard Global 200, "Midnight Sun" peaked at number 27.

== Track listing ==
"Midnight Sun (Bundle)"
No.	Title	Writer(s)	Producer(s)	Length
1.	"Midnight Sun" (live)	Zara Larsson; Helena Gao; Uzoechi Osisioma Emenike; Margo Wildman		3:59
2.	"Midnight Sun" (Alex Chapman remix)	Larsson; Gao; Emenike; Wildman	Margo XS; Alex Chapman^{[a]}; MNEK^{[v]}; Troy Taylor^{[v]}	3:14
3.	"Midnight Sun"	Larsson; Gao; Emenike; Wildman	Margo XS; MNEK^{[p]}; Troy Taylor^{[v]}	3:09
Total length:				10:22

"Midnight Sun" (remix)
No.	Title	Writer(s)	Producer(s)	Length
1.	"Midnight Sun" (Muni Long remix)	Zara Larsson; Muni Long; Helena Gao; Uzoechi Osisioma Emenike; Margo Wildman	Margo XS; MNEK^{[p]}; Troy Taylor^{[v]}	3:46
2.	"Midnight Sun"	Larsson; Gao; Emenike; Wildman	Margo XS; MNEK^{[p]}; Troy Taylor^{[v]}	3:09
Total length:				6:55

=== Notes ===
- ^{^[a]} signifies additional producer.
- ^{^[v]} signifies vocal producer.

== Charts ==
=== Weekly charts ===
==== Original version ====
Weekly chart performance
Chart (2025–2026)	Peak position
Australia (ARIA)	16
Australia Airplay (RCS)	2
Austria (Ö3 Austria Top 40)	55
Belgium (Ultratop 50 Flanders)	50
Bolivia Anglo Airplay (Monitor Latino)	13
Canada Hot 100 (Billboard)	6
Canada AC (Billboard)	5
Canada CHR/Top 40 (Billboard)	1
Canada Hot AC (Billboard)	3
Central America Anglo Airplay (Monitor Latino)	11
Colombia Anglo Airplay (Monitor Latino)	9
CIS Airplay (TopHit)	188
Croatia International Airplay (Top lista)	53
Costa Rica Anglo Airplay (Monitor Latino)	10
Dominican Republic Anglo Airplay (Monitor Latino)	16
Estonia Airplay (TopHit)	30
Finland Airplay (Radiosoittolista)	61
France (SNEP)	189
Germany (GfK)	72
Global 200 (Billboard)	27
Greece International (IFPI)	81
Iceland (Billboard)	16
Ireland (IRMA)	12
Israel International Airplay (Media Forest)	19
Kazakhstan Airplay (TopHit)	5
Latvia Airplay (TopHit)	130
Lithuania Airplay (TopHit)	39
Malta Airplay (Radiomonitor)	11
Mexico Anglo Airplay (Monitor Latino)	13
Netherlands (Dutch Top 40)	13
Netherlands (Single Top 100)	19
Netherlands Airplay (Dutch Charts)	17
New Zealand (Recorded Music NZ)	11
New Zealand Airplay (RCS)	30
Nicaragua Anglo Airplay (Monitor Latino)	1
Norway (VG-lista)	28
Panama Anglo Airplay (Monitor Latino)	11
Paraguay Anglo Airplay (Monitor Latino)	12
Poland Airplay (OLiS)	33
Portugal (AFP)	69
Puerto Rico Anglo Airplay (Monitor Latino)	4
Slovakia Airplay (ČNS IFPI)	27
Sweden (Sverigetopplistan)	4
Switzerland (Schweizer Hitparade)	43
UK Singles (Official Charts)	7
US Billboard Hot 100	12
US Adult Contemporary (Billboard)	20
US Adult Pop Airplay (Billboard)	2
US Dance Airplay (Billboard)	1
US Hot Dance/Pop Songs (Billboard)	1
US Pop Airplay (Billboard)	1
US Rhythmic Airplay (Billboard)	33
Venezuela Anglo Airplay (Monitor Latino)	10

==== Girls Trip version ====
Weekly chart performance
Chart (2026)	Peak position
Estonia Airplay (TopHit)	92
Latvia Airplay (TopHit)	112
New Zealand Hot Singles (RMNZ)	8
Peru Anglo Airplay (Monitor Latino)	12

=== Monthly charts ===
==== Original version ====
Monthly chart performance
Chart (2025–2026)	Peak position
Estonia Airplay (TopHit)	32
Kazakhstan Airplay (TopHit)	16
Lithuania Airplay (TopHit)	40

=== Year-end charts ===
==== Original version ====
Year-end chart performance
Chart (2025)	Position
Sweden (Sverigetopplistan)	62

== Certifications ==
Certifications
Region	Certification	Certified units/sales
Austria (IFPI Austria)	Gold	15,000^{‡}
Belgium (BRMA)	Platinum	40,000^{‡}
Canada (Music Canada)	2× Platinum	160,000^{‡}
Denmark (IFPI Danmark)	Gold	45,000^{‡}
France (SNEP)	Gold	100,000^{‡}
New Zealand (RMNZ)	Platinum	30,000^{‡}
Norway (IFPI Norway)	Platinum	60,000^{‡}
Portugal (AFP)	Platinum	25,000^{‡}
Switzerland (IFPI Switzerland)	Gold	15,000^{‡}
United Kingdom (BPI)	Platinum	600,000^{‡}
United States (RIAA)	Platinum	1,000,000^{‡}
^{‡} Sales+streaming figures based on certification alone.

== Release history ==
List of release dates and formats
Region	Date	Format	Edition	Label	Ref.
Various	13 June 2025	Digital download; streaming	Original	Sommer House; Epic	
Various	1 August 2025	Digital download; streaming	Bundle	Sommer House; Epic	
Various	14 November 2025	Digital download; streaming	Muni Long remix	Sommer House; Epic	
Various	6 January 2026	Digital download; streaming	"Lush Life" + "Midnight Sun"	Sommer House; Epic	
United States	13 January 2026	Contemporary hit radio	Original	Epic	
Various	6 March 2026	Digital download; streaming	+ more	Sommer House; Epic	
United States	17 July 2026	4-inch vinyl	Tiny Vinyl	Epic	

== See also ==
- List of Billboard number-one dance songs of 2026
