= Harry Daniels (internet personality) =

American internet personality

- Born: Harrison Jack Daniels; January 26, 2004 (age 22)
- Occupation: Social media personality
- Years active: 2022–present

TikTok information
- Page: harry daniels
- Followers: 2.1 million
- Last updated: May 10, 2025

Harrison Jack Daniels is an American social media personality and singer. He found success online starting in 2022 for TikTok videos of him singing poorly to celebrities, which have been described by some critics as a form of cringe comedy. He was signed to United Talent Agency in 2024, but was dropped in late 2026, due to a disagreement.

== Life and career ==
Daniels grew up on Long Island, New York. His mother is a stay-at-home mom while his father works as an accountant. As of 2024, his sister, Madeline, works as his manager and camerawoman. His other sister, Sam, is a musician. He spent his early childhood on Stan Twitter, creating a Demi Lovato fan account at age nine. A video of him at age 13 arguing with a Selena Gomez fan about Zara Larsson outside of a Camila Cabello fan event went viral online.

Daniels later became popular on TikTok, starting his account in 2022, for videos in which he awkwardly sings off-key to celebrities, which he has described as trolling. He first did it for Sabrina Carpenter at a signing for her 2022 album Emails I Can't Send, the video of which became popular online. He then did two more videos in which he rapped and sang, respectively, to Megan Thee Stallion and Willow Smith. Since starting his account, he has sung to Margot Robbie, Timothée Chalamet, Jacob Elordi, Le Sserafim, Charli XCX, Kendall Jenner, Kelly Clarkson, Sarah Paulson, Constance Wu, Gypsy Rose Blanchard, Charlie Puth, Doja Cat, Luke Hemmings, Conan Gray, PinkPantheress, Lea Michele, Ethan Cutkosky, Omar Apollo, Addison Rae, Vinnie Hacker, Jelly Roll, Chief Keef, Trippie Redd, mgk, Julia Fox, Jessica Chastain, Katy Perry, Ellie Goulding, Tyga, Becky G, Reneé Rapp, Dylan Minnette, Gwen Stefani, Paris Hilton, and Dua Lipa.

In December 2023, he was invited by the marketing firm FanMade to sing to people, such as Ryan Seacrest, Cher, Martha Stewart, Andy Cohen, and Carpenter, backstage at the iHeartRadio Jingle Ball. Daniels was again invited by FanMade to attend the 49th People's Choice Awards in February 2023, where he asked attendees, including America Ferrera, Billie Eilish, and Ariana Greenblatt, if they would rather have a "gay son or thot daughter", a question that had gone viral on TikTok and Twitter. Social media users criticized Daniels for asking the question as disrespectful. By March 2024, he had over one million followers on TikTok. In April 2024, he sang Lana Del Rey's 2012 song "National Anthem" for President Joe Biden at a Radio City Music Hall fundraiser, in a video that received over three million views. He signed with United Talent Agency in June 2024, by which point he had over 1.3 million followers on TikTok. He also sang to former president Barack Obama in June 2024, and, in July 2024, he sang a rendition of Beyoncé's song "Formation" to Vice President Kamala Harris. Daniels stated he planned to release music in September 2024 and released his debut single "I'm Him" in October 2024.

== Public image ==
Tomás Mier of Rolling Stone described Daniels's videos as "often-cringe, always-funny, [and] sometimes-annoying". For British Vogue, Alex Kessler wrote that Daniels "possesses a unique talent for delivering cringe-worthy serenades to stars ... in the most painful yet oddly mesmerizing way". Jo Vito, for Consequence, wrote that he was "known for his videos where he puts celebrities on the spot by cringingly singing off-tune for them". Alaina Demopoulos of The Guardian wrote that there was "something bleak about his outsider-y bit inevitably becoming part of the star machine" and that they felt "like SNL shorts – less gonzo fun, more fuel for PR campaigns and album release calendars". He was parodied in a Saturday Night Live sketch, in which Bowen Yang portrayed him being paid off by Billie Eilish to stop bothering her, in October 2024.
