= Don't Worry Bout Me Tour =

2019 concert tour by Zara Larsson

- Tour by Zara Larsson
- Location: North America; Europe
- Associated albums: So Good; Poster Girl
- Start date: April 29, 2019
- End date: October 3, 2019
- Legs: 3
- No. of shows: 29
- Supporting act: Astrid S

Zara Larsson concert chronology
- So Good World Tour (2017–18); Don't Worry Bout Me Tour (2019); Poster Girl Tour (2021–22)

The Don't Worry Bout Me Tour was the second major concert tour by Swedish singer Zara Larsson, to promote her second studio album, So Good (2017) and her third studio album Poster Girl (2021). The five-month tour began on April 29, 2019, in San Francisco and concluded on October 3, 2019 in Atlanta.

== Background ==
Days before the release of his single "Don't Worry Bout Me", Larsson announced that she would be embarking on her second concert tour. Dates were first announced for North America on February 26, 2019. Due to overwhelming demand, additional dates were added for Europe on March 25, 2019. On July 23, 2019 Larsson announced that she would be performing again at North America for fall. Larsson also performed at several major music festivals, including BBC Radio 1's Big Weekend in England, Firenze Rocks in Italy, Stavernfestivalen in Norway, Sensommar Festival, Way Out West Festival in Sweden and iHeartRadio Music Festival in United States. In addition, during that time Larsson was also embarked with Ed Sheeran on some dates of ÷ Tour around France, Portugal, Spain, Austria, Romania, Czech Republic, Latvia, Russia, Finland, Denmark and Iceland.

Opening acts for the tour in Europe included Lennixx, Fancy Footwork and Nancy Goreng. In their last stage of concerts in the United States they opened for the Larsson show Archie, Frankie Simone, Tishmal, YaSi and Savanah Low.

== Concert synopsis ==
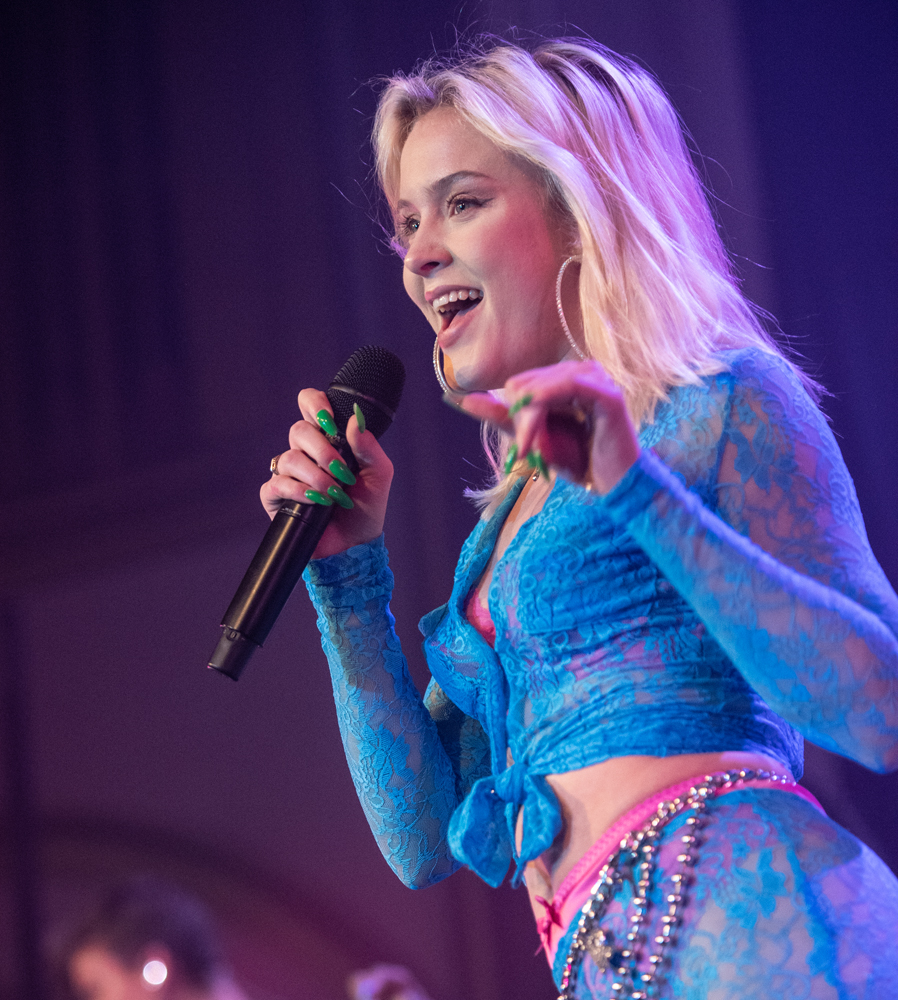
Larsson performed at the Neptune Theatre in Seattle.

The show begins with Zara dressed in white taking the stage atop a metal platform, backed by her four-member band, two background singers and two dancers, opening the show with her Clean Bandit collaboration, "Symphony". After the song ends, she greets the crowd, interacts with them, and goes on to perform "I Would Like". The next song she performs is "This One's for You" her collaboration with the French DJ David Guetta.

Then, Larsson presents for the first time two new songs from her third studio album: "Ruin My Life" and "Don't Worry Bout Me". Zara starts singing "Carry You Home" which in the middle mixes with elements of the song "Wake Me Up" by Swedish DJ Avicii. "TG4M" and "Wanna" follow, the latter Zara decided to present her on the tour, since she could not include it in her album So Good, and then she performs the song of the same name from her album.

Zara goes on stage again to perform "All the Time" another unreleased song. In a tender moment, Zara briefly slowed down the show by performing "Uncover" and the lights were lowered so that the audience began to illuminate with their cell phone flashlights. With this same atmosphere, she began to sing "I Can't Fall In Love Without You". Her next act was to sing "Wow" changing the energy again with intense dancing and then she performed her hit "Lush Life".

Finally to close the show, Larsson sang "Ain't My Fault" which contained elements of "Girls Like" her collaboration with the British rapper Tinie Tempah and "Never Forget You" (her collaboration with the British singer MNEK).

== Critical response ==
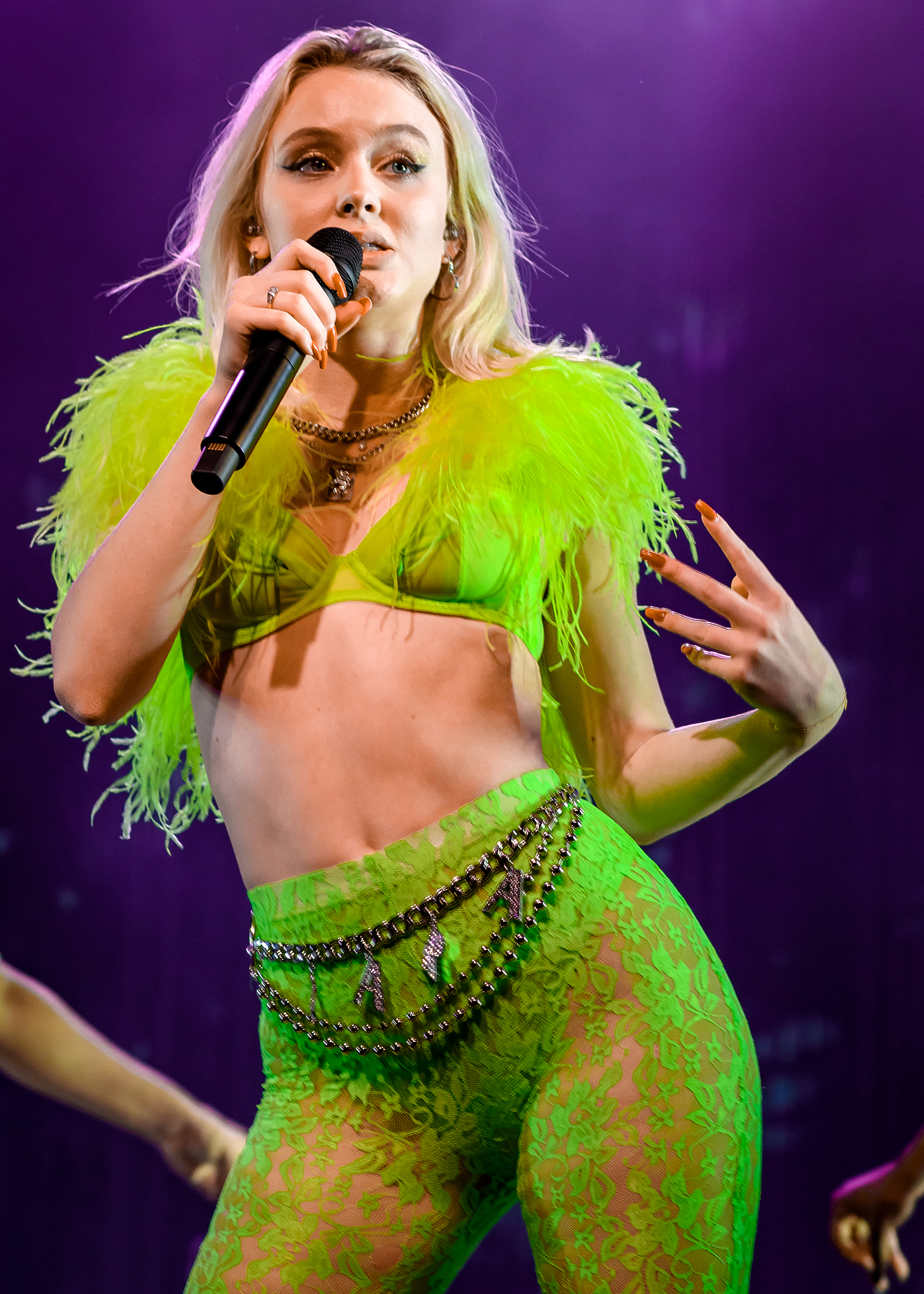
Larsson performing at The Observatory in Santa Ana.

=== North America ===
The tour received positive reviews from music critics in the United States. In a review for Melodic Magazine, Angel Escobar wrote: "With amazing stage production and smooth transitions, the show truly was the best it could be. From the flashing white lights to the moody blues, everything was timed accordingly to what was going on stage. Zara’s unlimited energy was emphasized with the nonstop music. As one song would end, it would quickly transition to another keeping the energy level at an all time high". Escobar also highlighted: "There is no denying that Zara Larsson is the total package. With an infectious personality and an enormous amount of talent, Zara will instantly win you over".

Doug Krantz from Veracious Magazine wrote: "Zara triumphantly took to the stage standing high atop a metallic platform [...]. She showed off her vocal prowess, easily moving between stellar runs and high energy choreography. It’s clear that Zara Larsson is not here to play, as this show truly showcased an artist at their best, having fun, performing full out, and giving us back 110% of the energy we were giving her". Matt Torres from the Soundazed said that "Zara Larsson sure puts on a damn great show [...]. From the powerful live vocals that led each track to the infectious and tantalizing dance moves that kept us on our toes, Zara Larsson was on fire as she delivered her most successful hits". Also added that "her stage presence demands attention, her voice is showstopping, and her choreography will have you queuing up YouTube dance tutorials just to keep up".

The third leg of the tour has also received positive reviews. Scott Rowe from MTC MAG commented that "It's clear from the very start that Zara has got a amazing voice. Zara and her dancers do a fantastic job onstage with what seems a nonstop variety of choreography, which is welcomed with her catchy songs". Blake Charles of Beyond The Stage praised Zara's night show at the Wonder Ballroom in Portland, expressing that "Larsson's incredible vocals soared over the glistening production, all while a colorful array of lights shone down from above, making for a perfect way to start the show. Her ability to go on the most imopressive of vocal runs one second, then jump into a split the next, is beyond impressive, and proves how dynamic of a performer she is. It was truly a magical and triumphant show".

=== Europe ===
In Europe, Larsson's performance was praised by critics, with many praising her vocals, her dances and her energy. Lisa Hafey of Essentially Pop stated that "She gave the capacity crowd what they wanted: strong, soaring, vocals, supported by a live band. Larsson has an incredible voice, and she demonstrated her range to full effect during the show. There was also a nice gender balance as well, which made for a great atmosphere". Brett Dunford of Louder Than War described that the interpretation of "Don't Let Me Be Yours" reflects "her helium voice so angelic", stated that her set "closes on epic form" and finally said that "one word sums the area up: happiness".

Alina Hasky of Minuten Musik said that "Vocally she shined at a very high level and was fitter than ever. She presented herself as absolutely talented and took the stage with a lot of energy and power. Larsson danced as hard as he could and reveled in very sophisticated choreography".

== Set list ==
This set list is from the show on September 17, 2019, in Seattle. It is not intended to represent all concerts for the tour.

1. "Symphony"
2. "I Would Like"
3. "This One's for You"
4. "Ruin My Life"
5. "Don't Worry Bout Me"
6. "Don't Let Me Be Yours"
7. "Carry You Home" / "Wake Me Up" (Avicii cover)
8. "TG4M"
9. "Wanna"
10. "So Good"
11. "All the Time"
12. "Uncover"
13. "I Can't Fall In Love Without You"
14. "Wow"
15. "Lush Life"

Encore

16. "Ain't My Fault"
17. "Never Forget You"

== Shows ==
List of 2019 concerts
| Date | City | Country | Venue | Opening acts | Attendance | Revenue |
|---|---|---|---|---|---|---|
| April 29, 2019 | San Francisco | United States | The Fillmore | Astrid S | — | — |
| April 30, 2019 | Los Angeles | United States | The Fonda Theatre | Astrid S | 1,200 / 1,200 | $30,000 |
| May 2, 2019 | Santa Ana | United States | The Observatory | Astrid S | — | — |
| May 6, 2019 | Chicago | United States | House of Blues | Astrid S | 1,800 / 1,800 | $60,000 |
| May 8, 2019 | Boston | United States | Paradise Rock Club | Astrid S | 933 / 933 | $27,057 |
| May 9, 2019 | New York | United States | Irving Plaza | Astrid S | 1,200 / 1,200 | $43,200 |
| May 11, 2019 | Washington | United States | 9:30 Club | Astrid S | 1,200 / 1,200 | $48,000 |
| May 12, 2019 | Philadelphia | United States | Union Transfer | Astrid S | 1,200 / 1,200 | — |
| May 21, 2019 | Manchester | England | Albert Hall | Lennixx | — | — |
| May 22, 2019 | London | England | Electric Brixton | Lennixx | — | — |
| May 25, 2019^{[A]} | Middlesbrough | England | Stewart Park | — | — | — |
| June 14, 2019^{[B]} | Florence | Italy | Visarno Arena | — | — | — |
| June 20, 2019 | Munich | Germany | Muffathalle | Fancy Footwork | — | — |
| June 25, 2019 | Cologne | Germany | Carlswerk Victoria | — | — | — |
| June 26, 2019 | Amsterdam | Netherlands | Melkweg | Nancy Goreng | — | — |
| July 6, 2019^{[C]} | Sundsvall | Sweden | NP3 Arena | — | — | — |
| July 12, 2019^{[D]} | Stavanger | Norway | Stavanger Konserthus | — | — | — |
| August 8, 2019^{[F]} | Gothenburg | Sweden | Slottsskogen | — | — | — |
| August 31, 2019^{[F]} | Trondheim | Norway | Kristiansten Fortress | — | — | — |
| September 15, 2019 | Oxford | United States | The Grove | Josie Dunne; Betcha | — | — |
| September 17, 2019 | Seattle | United States | Neptune Theatre | Archie | — | — |
| September 18, 2019 | Portland | United States | Wonder Ballroom | Frankie Simone | — | — |
| September 20, 2019 | Salt Lake City | United States | The Depot | Tishmal | — | — |
| September 21, 2019^{[G]} | Las Vegas | United States | T-Mobile Arena | — | — | — |
| September 24, 2019 | Englewood | United States | Gothic Theatre | YaSi | — | — |
| September 26, 2019 | Dallas | United States | House of Blues | Savannah Low | — | — |
| September 28, 2019 | Houston | United States | White Oak Music Hall | — | — | — |
| September 30, 2019 | Tampa | United States | The Ritz Ybor | — | — | — |
| October 1, 2019 | Lake Buena Vista | United States | House of Blues | — | — | — |
| October 3, 2019 | Atlanta | United States | Buckhead Theatre | — | — | — |
| Total: | | | | | — | — |

Festivals and other miscellaneous performances
^{[A]}This concert was part of the "BBC Radio 1's Big Weekend"
^{[B]}This concert was part of the "Firenze Rocks"
^{[C]}This concert was part of the "Sensommar Festival"
^{[D]}This concert was part of the "Stavernfestivalen"
^{[E]}This concert was part of the "Way Out West Festival"
^{[F]}This concert was part of the "Festningen Festival"
^{[G]}This concert was part of the "iHeartRadio Music Festival"
