= So Good (Zara Larsson album) =

2017 studio album by Zara Larsson

Studio album by Zara Larsson
- Released: 17 March 2017
- Recorded: 2015–2016
- Studios: Windmark; Rodeo (Santa Monica, California); RBD (North Hollywood, California); Eccentric (Oslo, Norway); Basecamp; TEN (Stockholm, Sweden); Major Toms; Fred's Sheo (London, United Kingdom)
- Genre: Pop
- Length: 50:31
- Labels: TEN; Epic
- Producers: Stargate; Freedo; Charlie Puth; Steve Mac; MNEK; Markus Sepehrmanesh; ST!NT; John Hill; The Monsters and the Strangerz; Clean Bandit; Mark Ralph; Jason Gill; Astronomyy; Astma & Rocwell; Hampus Lindvall; Danny Boy Styles; German; Phil Shaouy; Brian Garcia; Mike Spencer; Kid Joki; Fred Ball; Shuko

Zara Larsson chronology
Uncover (2015)	So Good (2017)	Poster Girl (2021)

Singles from So Good
- 1. "Lush Life" Released: 5 June 2015; 2. "Never Forget You" Released: 22 July 2015; 3. "Ain't My Fault" Released: 2 September 2016; 4. "I Would Like" Released: 11 November 2016; 5. "So Good" Released: 27 January 2017; 6. "Don't Let Me Be Yours" Released: 12 May 2017; 7. "Only You" Released: 11 August 2017

So Good is the second studio album by Swedish singer and songwriter Zara Larsson. It was released on 17 March 2017 through TEN Music Group and Epic Records, after a planned release in January 2017 was pushed back. The album was primarily recorded at Windmark Recording in California, and recording sessions with a handful of producers for the album began in 2015 and concluded a year later.

So Good was supported by seven singles; "Lush Life", "Never Forget You" with MNEK, "Ain't My Fault", "I Would Like", "So Good" featuring Ty Dolla $ign, "Don't Let Me Be Yours" and "Only You". "Lush Life", "Never Forget You" and "Ain't My Fault" all charted on the US Billboard Hot 100. To further promote the album, Larsson embarked on the So Good World Tour from October 2017 to March 2018.

So Good received generally positive reviews from music critics upon its release, who complimented the album's production and Larsson's vocal performance. It debuted and peaked at number 26 on the US Billboard 200, charting at number one in Sweden, number two in Norway and number seven in the United Kingdom. The album also charted within the top-ten in Ireland, Australia, the Netherlands, Finland, Denmark and New Zealand, as well as reaching the top 20 in fifteen other countries.

== Background and recording ==
In a late 2015 interview with Idolator, Larsson had stated that she wanted to work with Swedish producer Max Martin. During an interview with Billboard in 2016, Larsson confirmed that she collaborated with members of Martin's production circle on the project, clarifying that while she did not work with Martin himself, she recorded with his "really good" team. She highlighted her repeated collaborations with MNEK and expressed particular enthusiasm for the Monsters & Strangerz. Larsson also cited contributors such as R. City and Justin Tranter.

In Entertainment Weekly, Larsson explained that decisions regarding producers, specific tracks, and even the album title were still unresolved, describing them as "the last thing" she intended to finalise. She admitted that she did not actively seek out well-known producers, saying she was "so bad at that" and cared less about a collaborator's résumé than their personal chemistry, emphasising she prioritised a "nice vibe" over past chart success. During an interview with Digital Spy, she confirmed that each song on the album was written and produced by a different production team. In November 2016, she revealed that the album had been finished.

== Composition ==
So Good is a pop album, including several ballads, R&B influences, and tropical house. In an interview with Entertainment Weekly, Larsson reiterated her broad definition of pop music and described the genre as encompassing artists ranging from the Weeknd and Taylor Swift to Beyoncé and Rihanna. According to her, the album reflects this expansive view, combining "very soulful songs", "electric dance songs", and "pure pop"; alongside darker material influenced by trap.

"So Good"
A 21-second sample from chorus of "So Good", featuring Ty Dolla Sign

Individual tracks on So Good were noted for drawing on distinct stylistic influences, including a fusion of Swedish pop and Afropop on "Sundown", golden-era R&B pop filtered through modern production in "So Good", exuberant pop balladry on "Funeral", an attempt at intimate synth-pop on "I Can't Fall in Love Without You", and bittersweet dance-pop on the MNEK collaboration "Never Forget You".

=== Artistic direction ===
Larsson suggested that So Good was less about adhering to a fixed style than following her instincts. The record's eclecticism reflects her wide-ranging listening habits, while collaborations, particularly with MNEK, naturally shaped its palette, resulting in material she characterised as "mysterious and a little sexy", while remaining firmly rooted in pop. The diversity of dancers she worked with for the music videos was partly intentional, as she explained that it would be "boring if everybody would look like me onstage" and that representation matters. She was involved in the album's visual direction, though the process was marked by frequent last-minute changes. The album cover photograph was taken from an existing magazine photoshoot, which she selected because she "liked the picture". About the album's title, she stated that she was easy to name it as So Good because for the album was literally "so good".

== Release ==
After several delays, Larsson released the cover artwork of the album alongside the title via her social media in February 2017. So Good was made available for pre-order that day; marking as the first album to be released internationally. At the same time, the release date of 17 March 2017 was confirmed, and Larsson revealed that Nigerian singer Wizkid would appear as a featured artist on a "dance-friendly" track. She also announced the So Good World Tour to support the album, which included Waterfront Hall on 15 October 2016 and Cliffs Pavilion on 28 October.

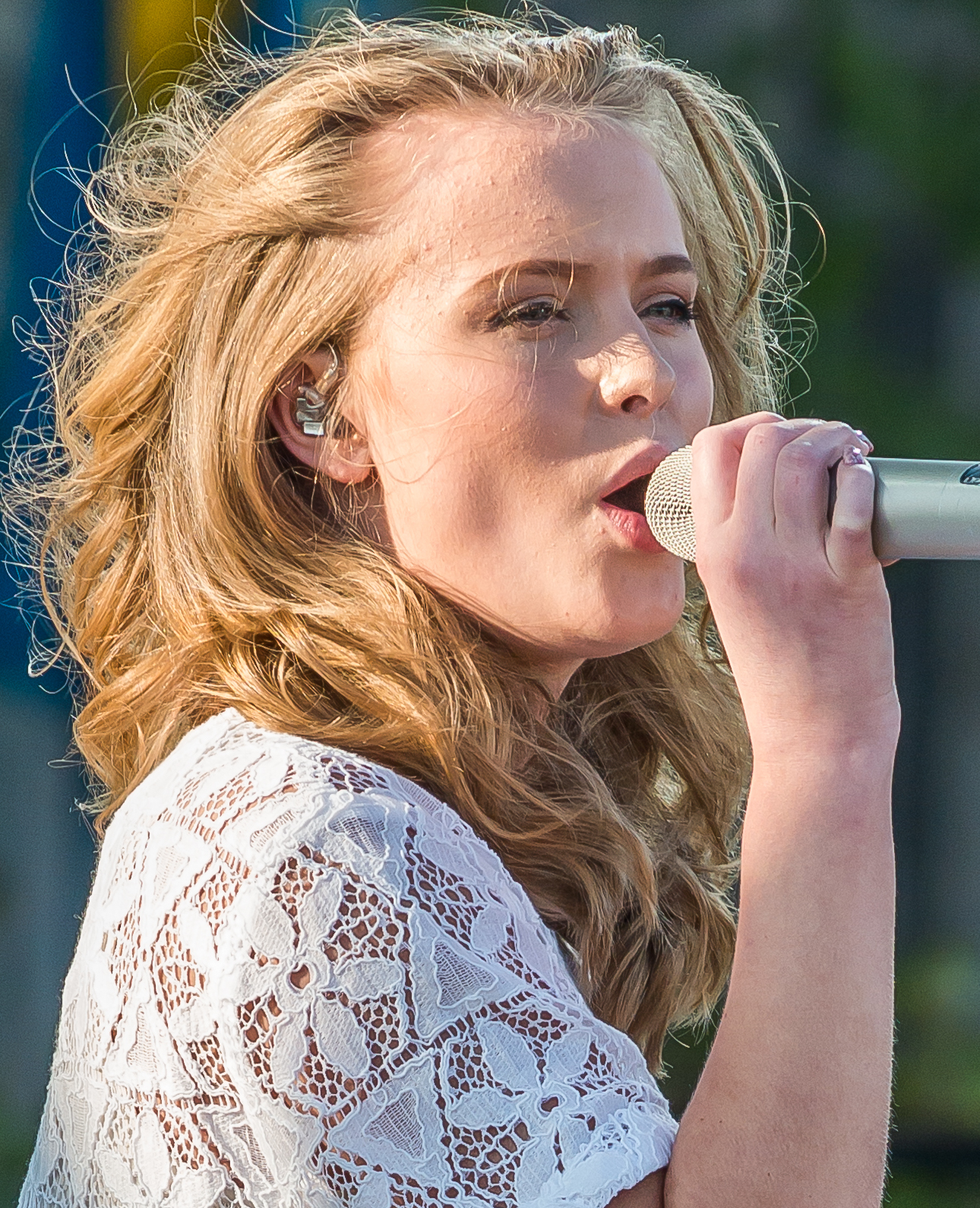
Larsson in June 2015, performing National Day of Sweden at Skansen, Stockholm

"Lush Life" was released as the lead single of So Good on 4 June 2015 in Sweden, and on 9 June internationally. (Note: International Apple Music release history of "Lush Life":) Three music videos were released for the song; the first was directed by Måns Nyman, while the second and third were both directed by Mary Clerté. It was an international success, peaking within the top 10 in several countries including the United Kingdom, Australia, Germany, and Spain. On 22 July, "Never Forget You" featuring MNEK was released digitally in the United Kingdom. Its music video, directed by Richard Paris Wilson, was released on 17 September 2015. The song peaked within the top 10 in several countries, including the United Kingdom, Sweden, Denmark, and Finland. The single also became both Larsson and MNEK's first US entry, managing to peak at number 13 in May 2016 on the Hot 100. The single was certified 4× Platinum in Sweden and 5× Platinum in the US.

On 2 September 2016, "Ain't My Fault" was released as the third single from the album. Its official music video, directed by Emil Nava, was premiered via Larsson's Vevo account on 30 September. It reached the top 20 in Australia, United Kingdom, Finland and Denmark among others, peaking at number one in Sweden. On 11 November, "I Would Like" was released as the fourth single. Larsson performed the song on the thirteenth series of The X Factor UK on 4 December. The song reached the top 10 in several countries, including the United Kingdom and Ireland.

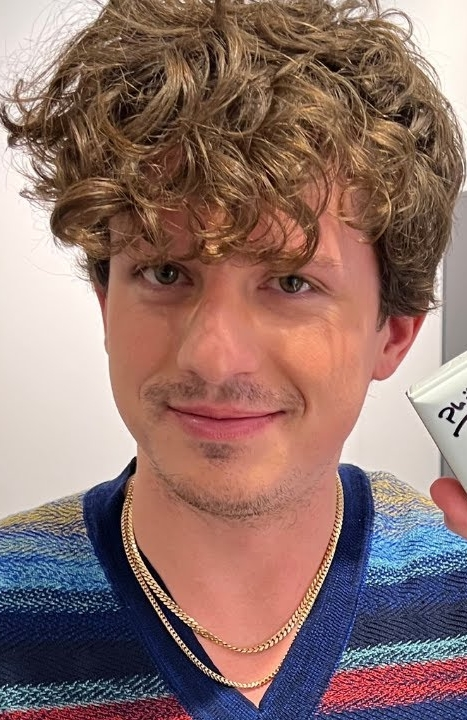
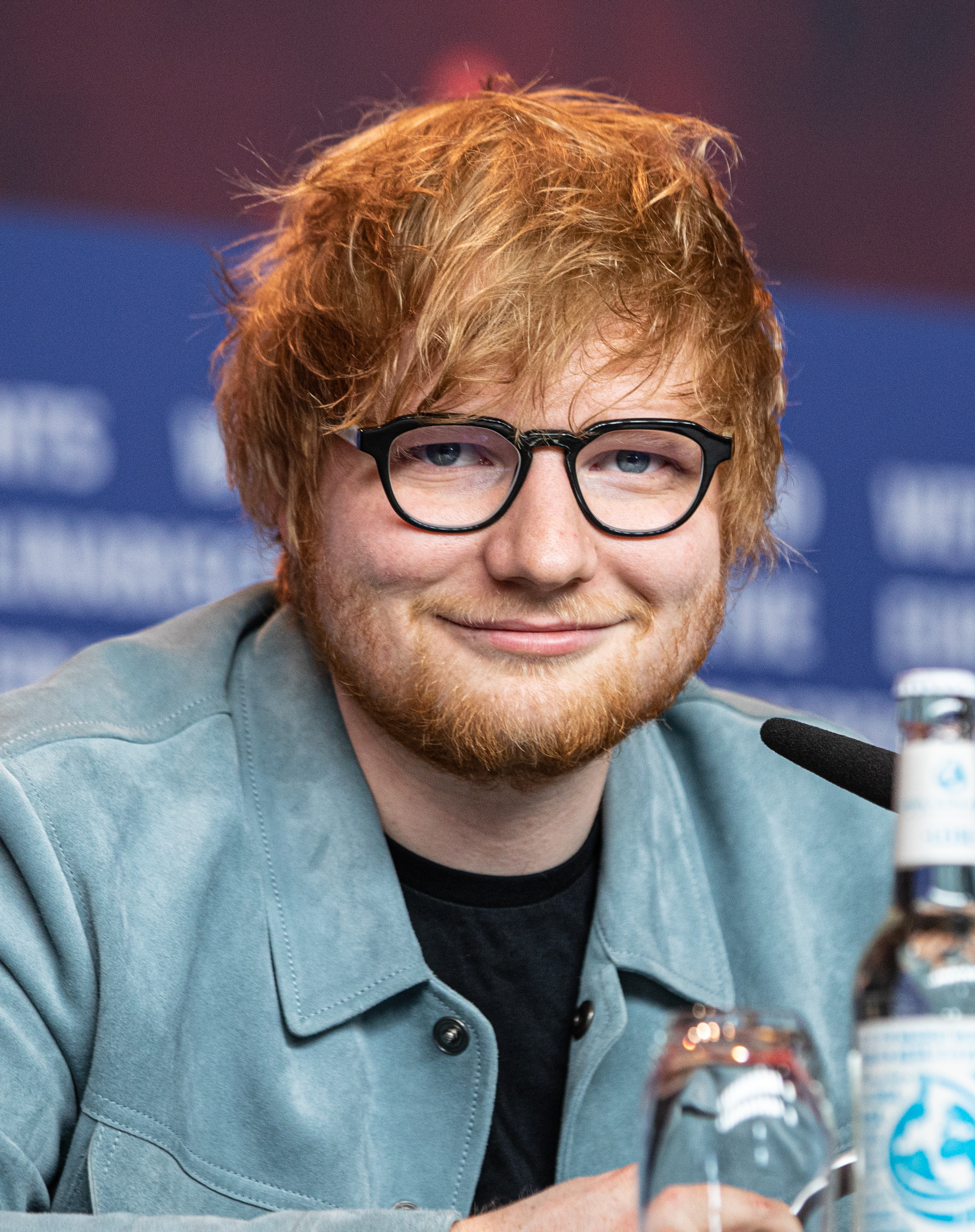
Larsson collaborated several singers in So Good, including Charlie Puth (left) for the title track and Ed Sheeran (right) for "Don't Let Me Be Yours".

On 27 January 2017, the title track, "So Good" featuring Ty Dolla $ign, was released as the fifth single from the album. Larsson co-wrote the song with Charlie Puth, and its music video, directed by Sarah McColgan, premiered on 3 February on Larsson's Vevo channel. The singers performed the song in The Ellen DeGeneres Show on 7 February and in The Wendy Williams Show on 23 March. It reached number seven in Sweden, where it was certified Gold. On 17 March, "Symphony" by Clean Bandit featuring Larsson, was released as a bonus track from the album, as well as the second single from their second album, What Is Love? (2018). The music video, directed by Clean Bandit members, Grace Chatto and Jack Patterson, premiered the same day. They gave the first live performance of the song on The Voice UK on 18 March. The song reached the top 10 of countries like Australia, Finland, Germany, and Ireland as well as reached the number one position in Norway, the United Kingdom, Scotland, and Sweden, becoming Larsson's fifth number one in her home country. It also gave Larsson her first number one single in the UK.

On 12 May, "Don't Let Me Be Yours", co-written with Ed Sheeran, was released as the sixth single alongside the music video. It reached the top 40 in her home country of Sweden during the week of her album's debut on the chart. On 11 August, "Only You" was released as the seventh and final single from the album; along with remixes from Canadian singer Olivier Dion and German singer Nena commissioned. The song reached number 5 in Sweden.

== Critical reception ==
Professional ratings
Aggregate scores
Source	Rating
AnyDecentMusic?	5.8/10
Metacritic	76/100
Review scores
Source	Rating
AllMusic	4/5 stars
Financial Times	3/5 stars
The Guardian	3/5 stars
The Line of Best Fit	5.5/10
The Music	3/5 stars
The New Zealand Herald	3/5 stars
NME	4/5 stars
The Observer	3/5 stars
The Standard	3/5 stars
The Times	2/5 stars

So Good was met with generally positive reviews from music critics upon its release. At Metacritic, which assigns a normalised rating out of 100 to reviews from professional publications, the album received an average score of 76, based on four reviews.

Harriet Gibsone of The Observer referred to So Good as "sugar-soaked postmodern pop", portraying Larsson as a "Rihanna-doting teen gatecrashing a tropical house party", while cautioning that the record risked fading quickly at a time when pop music was increasingly future-oriented. Writing for Otago Daily Times, Shane Gilchrist highlighted the album's "sugary syrup" and R&B bounce, noting Larsson's fluency with backbeats ranging from the dancehall pulse of "Lush Life" to slower R&B cuts, but argued that the album's "steamy tropical fever" ultimately became oppressive. The Times offered a more restrained assessment, praising the "dry, clean" production for its "arid beauty" and Larsson's technically assured vocals, though it criticised moments such as the "horrible" cod-Jamaican dancehall track "Sundown" as undermining the album's cohesion.

Several critics felt that So Good relied heavily on its strongest singles. The Line of Best Fit writer John Bell observed that So Good had "played its best cards early", and argued that many of its highlights arrived before release and that, at fifteen tracks, the record proved "a little cocksure". While acknowledging Larsson's personality and "fun but hard-headed attitude", the review suggested that the album's pacing weakened its overall impact. Nick Levine of NME awarded the album four stars and described the "big hits you know" as "obviously brilliant", while still finding some of the later ballads comparatively "dull".

Neil Z. Young of AllMusic praised Larsson's confident delivery and commercial instincts, describing So Good as "fun and engaging" and citing its polished, R&B-influenced pop songs as among the stronger releases of 2017. He positioned Larsson alongside artists such as Rihanna, Sia, and Tove Lo, noting her "undeniable bounce" and modern pop sensibility.

== Track listing ==
LP edition
No.	Title	Writer(s)	Producer(s)	Length
1.	"What They Say"	Marco Borrero; Mark Landon; Olivia Charlotte Waithe	MNEK	3:38
2.	"Lush Life"	Emanuel Abrahamsson; Marcus Sepehrmanesh; Södahl; Fridolin Walcher; Christoph Bauss; Iman Conta Hultén	Freedo; Shuko	3:20
3.	"I Would Like"	Zara Larsson; James Abrahart; Alexander Izquierdo; Marcus Lomax; Stefan Johnson; Jordan Johnson; Oliver Peterhof; Karen Chin; Anthony Kelly	The Monsters & Strangerz; German	3:44
4.	"So Good" (featuring Ty Dolla $ign)	Charles Puth Jr.; Jacob Kasher Hindlin; Gamal Lewis; Danny Schofield	Puth; Danny Boy Styles^{[b]}	2:46
5.	"TG4M"	Joakim Haukaas; Sepehrmanesh; Linnea Södahl	Kid Joki	2:52
6.	"Only You"	Herbert Joakim Berg; Michel Flygare; Tobias Jimson; Petra Marklund; Sepehrmanesh	Astma & Rocwell; Markus Sepehrmanesh	3:42
7.	"Never Forget You" (with MNEK)	Uzoechi Osisioma Emenike; Larsson; Aaron Davey	MNEK; Astronomyy^{[b]}	3:32
8.	"Sundown" (featuring Wizkid)	Larsson; Brian Garcia; Tor Erik Hermansen; Mikkel Storleer Eriksen; Hindlin; Phil Shaouy; Ammar Malik	Shaouy; Garcia; Stargate	3:25
9.	"Don't Let Me Be Yours"	Larsson; Steve McCutcheon; Johnny McDaid; Edward Christopher Sheeran	Steve Mac	3:19
10.	"Make That Money Girl"	Larsson; Ajay Bhattacharyya; Victor Kwesi Mensah; Kaj Erik Persson Hassle; Daniel Ladinsky; John Hill; Sepehrmanesh	Stint; Hill	3:18
11.	"Ain't My Fault"	Emenike; Larsson; Sepehrmanesh	MNEK; Mike Spencer^{[a]}	3:44
12.	"One Mississippi"	Julia Michaels; Fred Ball	Ball	3:07
13.	"Funeral"	Larsson; Jason Gill; Ana Diaz	Gill; Sepehrmanesh	3:35
14.	"I Can't Fall in Love Without You"	Christian Waltz; Hampus Lindvall; Jerker Hansson	Lindvall	2:57
Total length:				46:59

Digital and CD edition
No.	Title	Writer(s)	Producer(s)	Length
15.	"Symphony" (Clean Bandit featuring Zara Larsson)	Jack Patterson; Ina Wroldsen; McCutcheon; Malik	Clean Bandit; Mark Ralph	3:32
Total length:				50:31

Japanese digital and CD edition
No.	Title	Writer(s)	Producer(s)	Length
16.	"Ain't My Fault" (J Hus & Fred VIP remix)	Larsson; Emenike; Sepehrmanesh	MNEK; Spencer^{[a]}	3:31
17.	"I Would Like" (Gorgon City remix)	Larsson; Abrahart; Izquierdo; Lomax; Johnson; Johnson; Peterhof; Chin; Kelly	The Monsters & Strangerz; German	4:25
18.	"This One's for You" (David Guetta featuring Zara Larsson)	David Guetta; Giorgio Tuinfort; Nick van de Wall; Ester Dean; Thomas Troelsen	Guetta; Tuinfort; Afrojack	3:28
Total length:				62:12

=== Notes ===
- ^{^[a]} signifies an additional producer.
- ^{^[b]} signifies a co-producer.
- "I Would Like" contains a portion of the composition of "Dat Sexy Body", written by Sasha and Anthony Kelly.

== Credits and personnel ==
Credits were adapted from the liner notes and AllMusic.

=== Recording locations ===
- Windmark Recording; Santa Monica, California (1, 4, 8)
- RBD Studios; North Hollywood, California (3)
- Eccentric Studios; Oslo, Norway (5)
- Basecamp Studios; Stockholm, Sweden (6)
- Rodeo Recording; Santa Monica, California (10)
- Major Toms Studio; London, United Kingdom (11)
- Fred's Sheo; London, United Kingdom (12)
- TEN Studios; Stockholm, Sweden (14)

=== Personnel ===
- James Abrahart – backing vocals
- Astma & Rocwell – engineering, production
- Chris Athens – mastering
- Fred Ball – engineering, instrumentation, production
- Andy Barnes – vocal engineering
- Stephanie Benedetti – violin
- Joakim Berg – guitar
- Ajay Bhattacharyya – drum programming, keyboard programming, vocals
- Anita Marisa Boriboon – creative direction
- James Boyd – viola
- Grace Chatto – cello
- Clean Bandit – production
- Rob Cohen – engineering
- Matt Colton – mastering
- DannyBoyStyles – production
- Björn Engelmann – mastering
- Tom Fuller – engineering assistance
- Brian "Peoples" Garcia – production
- Serban Ghenea – mixing
- Jason Gill – engineering, instrumentation, production, programming
- Ola Håkansson – executive production
- John Hanes – mix engineering
- Jerker Hansson – backing vocals
- Maria Hazell – backing vocals
- John Hill – drum programming, keyboard programming, production, vocals
- Garrett Hilliker – art direction, design
- Dave Huffman – mastering
- Stefan Johnson – engineering
- Kid Joki – production
- Kirsten Joy – backing vocals
- Rob Kinelski – mixing
- Zara Larsson – vocals, backing vocals
- Chris Laws – drums, engineering
- Marcus Lomax – backing vocals
- M-Phazes – piano, synthesizer
- Steve Mac – keyboards, piano, production
- Erik Madrid – mixing
- Emerson Mancini – mastering
- Maria P. Marulanda – art direction
- MNEK – drums, engineer, keyboards, production, vocals
- The Monsters & Strangerz – engineering, production
- Liam Nolan – string engineering
- Jesper Nordenström – grand piano
- Jack Patterson – mixing, piano, synthesizer
- Luke Patterson – percussion
- Phil Paul – production
- Beatrice Philips – violin
- Dann Pursey – engineering
- Charlie Puth – production
- Mark Ralph – mixing
- Marc Regas – photography
- Bart Schoudel – vocal engineering, vocal production
- Ed Sheeran – backing vocals, guitar
- Shuko – mixing, production
- Drew Smith – engineering assistance
- Linnea Sodahl – backing vocals
- Mike Spencer – additional production, mixing, programming
- Phil Tan – mixing
- Tross – bass, backing vocals, engineering, keyboards, percussion, piano, production, programming, vocal engineering, vocal production
- Ty Dolla $ign – vocals
- Wizkid – vocals
- Bill Zimmerman – engineering
- Marcus Sepehrmanesh – A&R
- Henrik Larsson – A&R

== Charts ==
=== Weekly charts ===
Weekly chart performance
Chart (2017–2026)	Peak position
Australian Albums (ARIA)	7
Austrian Albums (Ö3 Austria)	28
Belgian Albums (Ultratop Flanders)	19
Belgian Albums (Ultratop Wallonia)	46
Canadian Albums (Billboard)	15
Danish Albums (Hitlisten)	8
Dutch Albums (Album Top 100)	7
Finnish Albums (Suomen virallinen lista)	6
French Albums (SNEP)	68
German Albums (Offizielle Top 100)	20
German Pop Albums (Offizielle Top 100)	8
Hungarian Albums (MAHASZ)	32
Irish Albums (IRMA)	4
Italian Albums (FIMI)	81
Japan Hot Albums (Billboard Japan)	45
Japanese Albums (Oricon)	51
Latvian Albums (LaIPA)	83
New Zealand Albums (RMNZ)	9
Norwegian Albums (VG-lista)	2
Polish Albums (ZPAV)	47
Portuguese Albums (AFP)	48
Scottish Albums (Official Charts)	8
South Korean Albums (Gaon)	51
Spanish Albums (Promusicae)	29
Swedish Albums (Sverigetopplistan)	1
Swiss Albums (Schweizer Hitparade)	15
UK Albums (Official Charts)	7
US Billboard 200	26

=== Year-end charts ===
Year-end chart performance
Chart (2017)	Position
Australian Albums (ARIA)	83
Belgian Albums (Ultratop Flanders)	103
Danish Albums (Hitlisten)	30
Dutch Albums (MegaCharts)	31
Icelandic Albums (Tónlistinn)	32
New Zealand Albums (RMNZ)	23
Swedish Albums (Sverigetopplistan)	4
UK Albums (OCC)	54
Chart (2018)	Position
Belgian Albums (Ultratop Flanders)	184
Danish Albums (Hitlisten)	60
Icelandic Albums (Tónlistinn)	76
Swedish Albums (Sverigetopplistan)	22
Chart (2019)	Position
Danish Albums (Hitlisten)	84
Swedish Albums (Sverigetopplistan)	52
Chart (2024)	Position
Swedish Albums (Sverigetopplistan)	89
Chart (2025)	Position
Swedish Albums (Sverigetopplistan)	65

== Certifications ==
List of certifications and sales
Region	Certification	Certified units/sales
Australia (ARIA)	Gold	35,000^{‡}
Brazil (Pro-Música Brasil)	Platinum	40,000^{‡}
Canada (Music Canada)	2× Platinum	160,000^{‡}
Denmark (IFPI Danmark)	3× Platinum	60,000^{‡}
France (SNEP)	Gold	50,000^{‡}
Germany (BVMI)	Gold	100,000^{‡}
Italy (FIMI)	Gold	25,000^{‡}
Mexico (AMPROFON)	Gold	30,000^{‡}
Netherlands (NVPI)	Diamond	93,000^{‡}
New Zealand (RMNZ)	4× Platinum	60,000^{‡}
Norway (IFPI Norway)	6× Platinum	120,000^{‡}
Poland (ZPAV)	Platinum	20,000^{‡}
Sweden (GLF)	2× Platinum	60,000^{‡}
United Kingdom (BPI)	Platinum	300,000^{‡}
United States (RIAA)	Platinum	1,000,000^{‡}
^{‡} Sales+streaming figures based on certification alone.

== Release history ==
List of release dates and formats
Region	Date	Format	Label	Ref.
Various	17 March 2017	CD; digital download; streaming	TEN; Epic; Sony	
Europe	17 March 2017	Vinyl LP	TEN; Epic; Sony	
United States	31 March 2017	Vinyl LP	TEN; Epic	
Japan	3 May 2017	CD	TEN; Epic; Sony Japan	
