= Lush Life (Zara Larsson song) =

2015 single by Zara Larsson

Single by Zara Larsson

from the album So Good
- A-side: "Midnight Sun"
- Released: 5 June 2015
- Genre: Electropop; tropical pop
- Length: 3:21
- Label: TEN; Epic
- Songwriters: Emanuel Abrahamsson; Elenna Jackson; Marcus Sepehrmanesh; Linnea Södahl; Fridolin Walcher; Christoph Bauss; Iman Conta Hultén
- Producers: Freedo; Shuko

Zara Larsson singles chronology
"Weak Heart" (2015)	"Lush Life" (2015)	"Never Forget You" (2015)

Music video
- "Lush Life" on YouTube

"Lush Life" is a song by Swedish singer and songwriter Zara Larsson. It was released as the lead single from her second studio album So Good (2017) on 5 June 2015 in Sweden, and internationally on 9 June 2015, through TEN Music Group and Epic Records. "Lush Life" is an electropop song, which lyrically explores living in the moment and enjoying yourself. The song was met with critical acclaim, with many critics noting its summery sound and catchiness. "Lush Life" won a Gaffa Award for Best Swedish Song in 2015, and was nominated for a Swedish Grammis Award in 2016 for Song of the Year.

Upon release, "Lush Life" received commercial success, peaking at number one in Sweden, and within the top five in 17 other countries, including Australia, Germany, the Netherlands, Norway, and the United Kingdom. It became one of the best-selling songs of the 2010s in the United Kingdom and one of the best-selling songs of all time in Sweden. It has received certifications in 22 countries, 21 of which are platinum or higher, including a diamond certification in France, Germany, the Netherlands, Mexico, Poland, and Sweden.

A remix of the song featuring British rapper Tinie Tempah was released on 26 February 2016, followed by an extended play (EP), Lush Life (The Remixes), on 4 March 2016, which includes four additional remixes of the song. Larsson has included "Lush Life" in the setlists of all of her concert tours, starting with her first major concert tour, the So Good World Tour (2017–2018), and most recently the Midnight Sun Tour (2025–2026).

In 2025, a clip of Larsson's performance of "Lush Life" from the Midnight Sun Tour went viral on TikTok, causing the song to re-enter the charts worldwide. The song's resurgence in popularity was also attributed to the "2026 is the new 2016" trend. "Lush Life" was subsequently nominated for the Social Song of the Year at the American Music Awards 2026.

== Background and composition ==
"Lush Life" was written by Emanuel Abrahamsson, Marcus Sepehrmanesh, Linnea Södahl, Fridolin Walcher, Christoph Bauss, and Iman Conta Hultén, during a songwriting camp in Stockholm. In a 2017 interview with Genius, Larsson explained that upon hearing the songs produced from the writing session, "Lush Life" was the one that stood out to her, and she ultimately chose to record it. The track was produced by Freedo and Shuko, and was mastered at Cuttingroom Studios in Stockholm. "Lush Life" has been described as a "summer jam" by Nick Levine of NME, and features electropop production, written in the key of B-flat major with a tempo of 96 beats per minute.

Lyrically, Larsson has described the first part of the chorus ("I live my day as if it was the last / live my day as if there was no past / Doin' it all night, all summer / Doin' it the way I wanna") as being about "just [living] in the moment and [trying] to enjoy it as much as possible" and "[living] the lush life all summer". On 27 August 2021, in celebration of the song surpassing 1 billion streams on Spotify, Larsson revealed that the released version of "Lush Life" was a remix, and she later released the original version of the song under the name "Retro Version".

== Critical reception ==
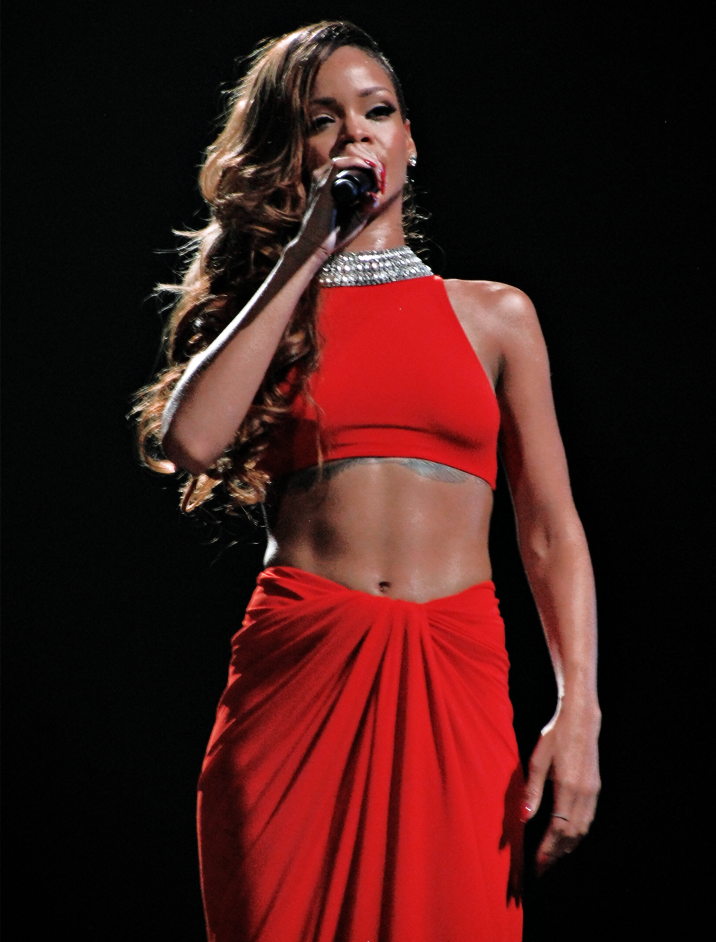
"Lush Life" was compared to the earlier works of Barbadian singer Rihanna (pictured).

Many critics noted that "Lush Life" had similarities to the music of Barbadian singer Rihanna. Nolan Feeney of Time described the song as a potential "song of the summer" for 2015, and praised the track's "island-pop" sound, comparing it to earlier works by Rihanna. The Guardian's Tim Jonze described "Lush Life" as a "brilliant Rihanna-sounding single", while The Standard's Rick Pearson described the track as incorporating the "dancehall-inspired grooves of Rihanna".

Following the release of the song's parent album So Good (2017), multiple reviewers of the album offered further praise to "Lush Life". Harriet Gibsone of The Guardian described the track as having a "rubbery bounce" and being "naggingly catchy", while AllMusic author Neil Z. Yeung commended it as being an "effective dose of tropical pop" that has a "playful whistle and undeniable bounce". Writing for Rolling Stone Australia in 2025, Cyclone Wehner described the song as a "trop-house banger" that became a "streaming smash" and foreshadowed Larsson's "blockbuster international debut" with So Good.

=== Year-end lists ===
Select rankings
Publication	List	Rank	Ref.
Aftonbladet	The 99 Best Songs of 2015	20	
Spin	The 101 Best Songs of 2015	28	

== Music videos ==
The original music video for "Lush Life", directed by Måns Nyman, was released in Sweden on 5 June 2015. The video is set against white, black, and grey backgrounds, with Larsson appearing in a succession of different outfits and performing simplistic choreography. The international version of the music video was released on 1 July, also directed by Nyman. This version of the video was described as "colourful" and "dance-tastic" by Andrew Hannah of The Line of Best Fit.

An alternative music video for "Lush Life" was released on 5 July 2016, and was directed by Mary Clerté. The video shows Larsson dancing in pastel-hued sets. Some scenes from the video feature backup dancers and a love interest played by British model Eyal Booker. This version is listed as an "Alternate Version" on YouTube, and has since garnered 72 million views as of September 2026.

== Live performances ==
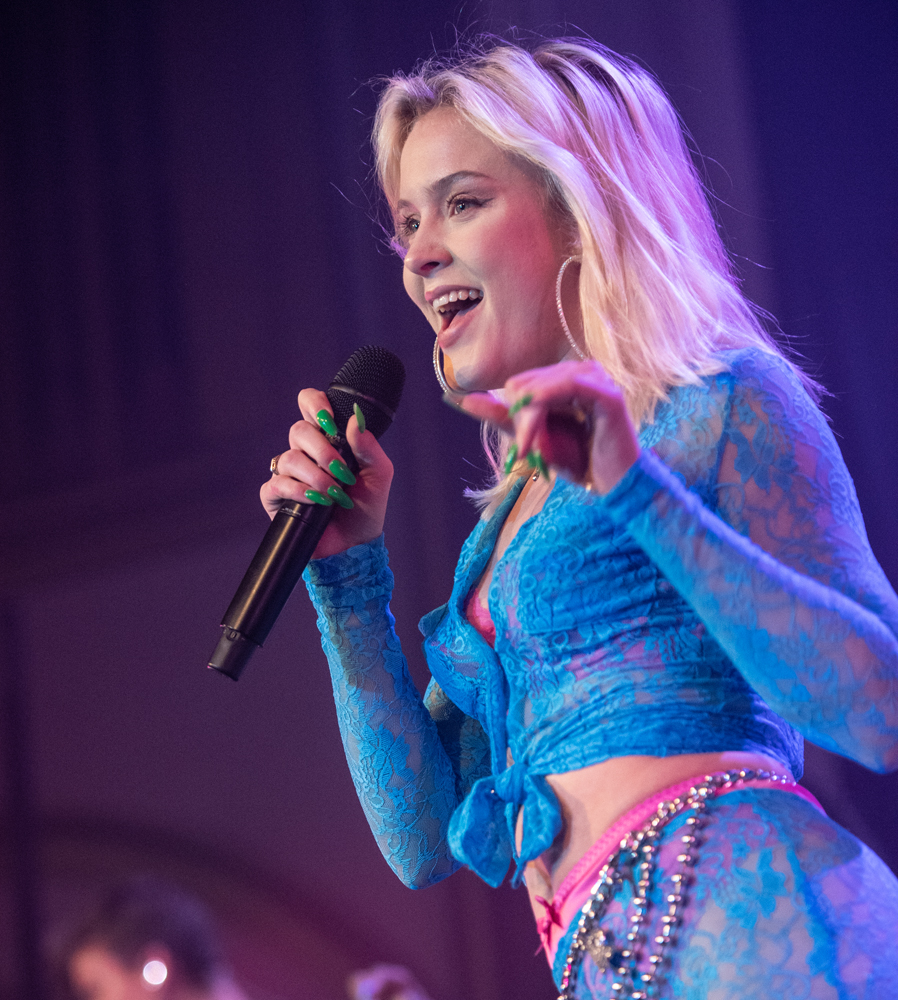
Larsson performing the song during her Don't Worry Bout Me Tour in 2019.

Larsson's first live performance of "Lush Life" was at Gröna Lund in Stockholm in May 2015, where she performed the original version of the song (later released in 2021 as the "Retro Version"). In July, she performed the song on the Swedish TV shows Allsång på Skansen and Sommarkrysset. In June 2016, Larsson performed "Lush Life" during her set at the Capital Summertime Ball at Wembley Stadium in London. At the 2016 MTV Europe Music Awards, she performed the song during the ceremony, where she also won the awards for Best New Act and Best Swedish Act. At the 2016 BBC Music Awards, she performed the song as a medley with "I Would Like".

In December 2017, Larsson performed "Lush Life" at the Nobel Peace Prize Concert in Oslo, and in December the following year, she performed the song at the Capital Jingle Bell Ball. Larsson has frequently performed the song in the following years, including at the Capital Summertime Ball in 2023 and 2025, and at the Hundred Final in August 2024. In the United States, Larsson performed "Lush Life" on the Today Show in November 2016 and in May 2026. In 2017, she performed the song at the pre-show festival for that year's MTV Movie & TV Awards, and as part of her set at Lollapalooza.

== Commercial performance ==
"Lush Life" has topped Sweden's Sverigetopplistan chart for seven nonconsecutive weeks in total, and became Larsson's second number-one single in her native country. The song has spent 151 weeks overall on the chart as of 22 November 2026, and is the thirteenth best-selling single of all time in the country. It received a ten times platinum certification from the Swedish Recording Industry Association (GLF), denoting sales of 400,000 equivalent units. The song spent five consecutive weeks at number one in Sweden during its initial chart run in 2015. For the chart week dated 23 January 2026, "Lush Life" once again reached number one in the country, where it remained for two weeks.

In the United States, "Lush Life" debuted at number 97 on the Billboard Hot 100 chart dating 30 July 2016, after spending 27 weeks on the Bubbling Under Hot 100 chart, eventually peaking at number 75 during the chart week ending 20 August. On the Pop Airplay chart, the track entered the top forty, reaching number 39 during the chart week ending 13 August. "Lush Life" has since been certified triple platinum in the United States by the Recording Industry Association of America (RIAA), denoting sales of three million units in the country. For the chart week dated 18 April 2026, "Lush Life" achieved a new peak position on the Billboard Hot 100 at number 35, during its twentieth week on the chart. On 21 April, the song was re-released to contemporary hit radio in the United States, and achieved a new peak of number 16 on the Pop Airplay chart for the week ending 24 October.

In the United Kingdom, "Lush Life" debuted at number 88 on the UK Singles Chart in January 2016. It eventually peaked at number three during the chart week ending 24 March, and became the sixth biggest song of 2016 in the country, moving 1.16 million combined units that year. "Lush Life" has spent 109 weeks in the top 100 of the UK Singles Chart as of 22 November 2026, and was the 63rd biggest song of the 2010s in the United Kingdom. It has been certified sextuple platinum by the British Phonographic Industry (BPI), denoting sales of 3.6 million units in the country. For the chart week dated 5 March 2026, the track matched its original peak of number three in the United Kingdom, and has spent a total of twenty additional weeks in the top ten following its initial chart run.

Elsewhere, "Lush Life" topped the charts in Mexico and Poland. It also peaked at number two in Denmark, Ireland, and Norway, number three in the Netherlands and Switzerland, number four in Germany, Austria, and Australia, and number six in Finland, during its original chart run.

=== Chart resurgence in 2025 and 2026 ===
Starting in November 2025, "Lush Life" began to see a resurgence on the charts, following a viral video of a fan who performed the song's choreography on stage with Larsson during her Midnight Sun Tour concert in Amsterdam. Subsequently, the song reached number one for the first time in Austria, the Czech Republic, Germany, Norway, and Lithuania, entering the chart for the first time in the latter country. In Germany, the song was certified diamond for moving over 1.5 million units, becoming Larsson's best-selling single in the country. Elsewhere, the song reached new chart peaks in multiple countries, including Canada (number 14), and Iceland (number five). "Lush Life" also appeared on numerous countries' charts for the first time, including in Greece (number 7), Israel (number 32), India (number 14), Romania (number 20), the Philippines (number 44), Singapore (number 19), and the United Arab Emirates (number 12). On the Billboard Global 200, "Lush Life" entered for the first time, peaking at number eight. The song's resurgence of success was also attributed to the "2026 is the new 2016" trend, with Kyle Denis of Billboard stating that "roughly a decade after her initial Hot 100 breakthrough, Zara Larsson is back in the conversation in a much bigger way — just like Charli XCX, Hozier and Tinashe in 2024".

== Accolades ==
"Lush Life" has won seven awards from eleven nominations, including a BMI Pop Award, a Gaffa Award for Best Swedish Song, and two awards at the Musikförläggarnas Pris for Song of the Year and Most Streamed Song of the Year in 2016. Following the song's resurgence of popularity in 2025 and 2026, it was nominated for Social Song of the Year at the American Music Awards 2026.

Awards and nominations
Organization	Year	Category	Result	Ref.
American Music Awards	2026	Social Song of the Year	Nominated	
BMI Awards	2017	Pop Award	Won	
DAF Bama Music Awards	2016	Best Song	Won	
Gaffa Awards (Sweden)	2015	Best Swedish Song	Won	
Grammis	2016	Song of the Year	Nominated	
MTV Video Play Awards	2016	Winning Video	Won	
Musikförläggarnas Pris	2016	Song of the Year	Won	
Musikförläggarnas Pris	2016	Most Streamed Song of the Year	Won	
P3 Gold Awards	2016	Song of the Year	Won	
Scandipop Awards	2016	Best Pop Song	Nominated	
Sync Awards	2016	Best Online / Viral Advert Song	Nominated	

== Track listing ==
Digital download
No.	Title	Length
1.	"Lush Life"	3:21

CD single
No.	Title	Length
1.	"Lush Life"	3:22
2.	"Lush Life" (Alex Adair remix)	3:34

Digital download – Remixes EP
No.	Title	Length
1.	"Lush Life" (Alex Adair remix)	3:34
2.	"Lush Life" (Zac Samuel remix; extended)	5:17

Digital download – Zac Samuel remix
No.	Title	Length
1.	"Lush Life" (Zac Samuel remix; extended)	5:17

Digital download – Tinie Tempah remix
No.	Title	Length
1.	"Lush Life" (featuring Tinie Tempah)	3:20
2.	"Lush Life" (featuring Tinie Tempah; dancehall remix)	3:23

Digital download – acoustic version
No.	Title	Length
1.	"Lush Life" (acoustic version)	3:22

Digital download – The Remixes
No.	Title	Length
1.	"Lush Life" (Zac Samuel remix; extended version)	5:17
2.	"Lush Life" (Alex Adair remix)	3:34
3.	"Lush Life" (French Braids remix; extended version)	3:24
4.	"Lush Life" (Zac Samuel dub remix; extended version)	5:00

Streaming – Lush Life + Midnight Sun
No.	Title	Length
1.	"Lush Life"	3:20
2.	"Midnight Sun"	3:09

== Credits and personnel ==
Credits are adapted from Apple Music.

- Zara Larsson – vocals
- Fridolin Walcher – composer, lyrics, producer, mixing engineer
- Shuko – producer, mixing engineer
- Mack – composer, lyrics, recording engineer, vocal producer
- Linnea Södahl – composer, lyrics
- Iman Conta Hulten – composer, lyrics
- Christoph Bauss – composer, lyrics
- Emmet – composer, lyrics
- Email – vocal producer, recording engineer
- Björn Engelmann – mastering engineer

== Charts ==
=== Weekly charts ===
2015–2016 weekly chart performance
Chart (2015–2016)	Peak position
Argentina Anglo Airplay (Monitor Latino)	13
Australia (ARIA)	4
Austria (Ö3 Austria Top 40)	4
Austria Airplay (IFPI)	2
Belgium (Ultratop 50 Flanders)	2
Belgium (Ultratop 50 Wallonia)	11
Canada Hot 100 (Billboard)	53
CIS Airplay (TopHit)	7
Croatia International Airplay (Top lista)	12
Czech Republic Airplay (ČNS IFPI)	14
Czech Republic Singles Digital (ČNS IFPI)	6
Denmark (Tracklisten)	2
Euro Digital Song Sales (Billboard)	7
Finland (Suomen virallinen lista)	6
France (SNEP)	16
France Airplay (SNEP)	11
Germany (GfK)	4
Germany Airplay (BVMI)	2
Hungary (Dance Top 40)	34
Hungary (Rádiós Top 40)	6
Hungary (Single Top 40)	5
Iceland (RÚV)	11
Ireland (IRMA)	2
Israel International Airplay (Media Forest)	2
Italy (FIMI)	20
Luxembourg (Billboard)	4
Mexico Ingles Airplay (Billboard)	1
Netherlands (Dutch Top 40)	3
Netherlands (Single Top 100)	3
New Zealand (Recorded Music NZ)	8
Norway (VG-lista)	2
Poland Airplay (ZPAV)	3
Poland (Polish TV Airplay Chart)	1
Portugal (AFP)	15
Russia Airplay (TopHit)	7
Scottish Singles Sales (Official Charts)	3
Slovakia Airplay (ČNS IFPI)	14
Slovakia Singles Digital (ČNS IFPI)	2
Slovenia Airplay (SloTop50)	12
Spain (Promusicae)	7
Sweden (Sverigetopplistan)	1
Switzerland (Schweizer Hitparade)	3
Ukraine Airplay (TopHit)	20
UK Singles (Official Charts)	3
US Billboard Hot 100	75
US Pop Airplay (Billboard)	39

2023–2026 weekly chart performance
Chart (2023–2026)	Peak position
Australia On Replay Singles (ARIA)	1
Austria (Ö3 Austria Top 40)	1
Belarus Airplay (TopHit)	128
Belgium (Ultratop 50 Flanders)	41
Canada Hot 100 (Billboard)	14
Canada CHR/Top 40 (Billboard)	3
Canada Hot AC (Billboard)	31
Croatia International Airplay (Top lista)	96
Czech Republic (Singles Digitál Top 100)	1
Denmark (Tracklisten)	12
Estonia Airplay (TopHit)	59
Finland (Suomen virallinen lista)	16
France (SNEP)	34
Germany (GfK)	1
Global 200 (Billboard)	8
Greece International (IFPI)	7
Hungary (Single Top 40)	21
Iceland (Billboard)	5
India International (IMI)	14
Ireland (IRMA)	6
Israel (Mako Hitlist)	32
Italy (FIMI)	59
Latvia Airplay (LaIPA)	11
Latvia Streaming (LaIPA)	4
Lithuania (AGATA)	1
Luxembourg (Billboard)	11
Netherlands (Dutch Top 40)	7
Netherlands (Single Top 100)	4
Norway (IFPI Norge)	1
Panama Streaming (PRODUCE)	180
Philippines Hot 100 (Billboard Philippines)	44
Poland (Polish Streaming Top 100)	19
Portugal (AFP)	31
Romania (Billboard)	20
Romania Airplay (TopHit)	178
Singapore (RIAS)	19
Slovakia Singles Digital (ČNS IFPI)	3
Spain (Promusicae)	47
Sweden (Sverigetopplistan)	1
Switzerland (Schweizer Hitparade)	5
United Arab Emirates (IFPI)	12
UK Singles (OCC)	3
US Billboard Hot 100	35
US Adult Pop Airplay (Billboard)	31
US Hot Dance/Pop Songs (Billboard)	2
US Pop Airplay (Billboard)	16

=== Monthly charts ===
Monthly chart performance
Chart (2026)	Peak position
Estonia Airplay (TopHit)	65
Lithuania Airplay (TopHit)	40

=== Year-end charts ===
Year-end chart performance
Chart (2015)	Position
Belgium (Ultratop 50 Flanders)	67
Denmark (Tracklisten)	19
Germany (Official German Charts)	56
Netherlands (Dutch Top 40)	27
Netherlands (Single Top 100)	36
Poland (ZPAV)	42
Sweden (Sverigetopplistan)	11

Year-end chart performance
Chart (2016)	Position
Australia (ARIA)	30
Austria (Ö3 Austria Top 40)	57
Belgium (Ultratop 50 Flanders)	88
Belgium (Ultratop 50 Wallonia)	52
CIS (Tophit)	27
Denmark (Tracklisten)	75
France (SNEP)	30
Germany (Official German Charts)	54
Hungary (Rádiós Top 40)	5
Hungary (Single Top 40)	32
Israel (Media Forest)	23
Italy (FIMI)	35
Netherlands (Dutch Top 40)	85
Netherlands (Single Top 100)	47
New Zealand (Recorded Music NZ)	20
Russia Airplay (Tophit)	21
Slovenia (SloTop50)	45
Spain (PROMUSICAE)	19
Sweden (Sverigetopplistan)	42
Switzerland (Schweizer Hitparade)	22
Ukraine Airplay (Tophit)	91
UK Singles (Official Charts Company)	6

Year-end chart performance
Chart (2025)	Position
Belgium (Ultratop 50 Flanders)	159
Sweden (Sverigetopplistan)	67

=== Decade-end charts ===
Decade-end chart performance
Chart (2010–2019)	Position
UK Singles (Official Charts Company)	63

== Certifications ==
Certifications and sales
Region	Certification	Certified units/sales
Australia (ARIA)	5× Platinum	350,000^{‡}
Austria (IFPI Austria)	Platinum	30,000^{‡}
Belgium (BRMA)	Platinum	20,000^{‡}
Brazil (Pro-Música Brasil)	3× Platinum	180,000^{‡}
Canada (Music Canada)	5× Platinum	400,000^{‡}
Denmark (IFPI Danmark)	5× Platinum	450,000^{‡}
France (SNEP)	Diamond	233,333^{‡}
Germany (BVMI)	Diamond	1,500,000^{‡}
Hungary (MAHASZ)	11× Platinum	33,000^{‡}
Italy (FIMI)	3× Platinum	150,000^{‡}
Mexico (AMPROFON)	Diamond+Gold	330,000^{‡}
Netherlands (NVPI)	Diamond	232,500^{‡}
New Zealand (RMNZ)	8× Platinum	240,000^{‡}
Norway (IFPI Norway)	9× Platinum	540,000^{‡}
Poland (ZPAV)	Diamond	100,000^{‡}
Portugal (AFP)	Gold	10,000^{‡}
Spain (Promusicae)	3× Platinum	180,000^{‡}
Sweden (GLF)	10× Platinum	400,000^{‡}
Switzerland (IFPI Switzerland)	2× Platinum	60,000^{‡}
United Kingdom (BPI)	6× Platinum	3,600,000^{‡}
United States (RIAA)	3× Platinum	3,000,000^{‡}
Streaming
Greece (IFPI Greece)	2× Platinum	4,000,000^{†}
^{‡} Sales+streaming figures based on certification alone.^{†} Streaming-only figures based on certification alone.

== Release history ==
Release dates and formats
Region	Date	Format	Label	Ref.
Sweden	5 June 2015	Digital download	TEN; Epic; Sony	
United Kingdom	9 June 2015	Digital download	TEN; Epic; Sony	
Australia	9 June 2015	Digital download	TEN; Epic; Sony	
United States	9 June 2015	Digital download	TEN; Epic; Sony	
United States	20 October 2015	Contemporary hit radio (original release)	Epic	
Germany	20 November 2015	CD single	TEN; Epic; Sony	
Sweden	26 February 2016	Digital download (featuring Tinie Tempah)	TEN; Epic; Sony	
Australia	26 February 2016	Digital download (featuring Tinie Tempah)	TEN; Epic; Sony	
United Kingdom	26 February 2016	Digital download (featuring Tinie Tempah)	TEN; Epic; Sony	
United Kingdom	4 March 2016	Digital download (Remixes)	TEN; Epic; Sony	
Sweden	1 April 2016	Digital download (Acoustic)	TEN; Epic; Sony	
Australia	1 April 2016	Digital download (Acoustic)	TEN; Epic; Sony	
United Kingdom	1 April 2016	Digital download (Acoustic)	TEN; Epic; Sony	
United States	20 June 2016	Hot adult contemporary radio	Epic	
United States	21 June 2016	Contemporary hit radio (re-release)	Epic	
Sweden	27 August 2021	Digital download (retro version)	TEN	
United States	21 April 2026	Contemporary hit radio (re-release)	Epic	
