= Ain't My Fault =

2016 single by Zara Larsson

Single by Zara Larsson

from the album So Good
- Released: 2 September 2016
- Studio: Major Toms (London, United Kingdom)
- Genre: Pop
- Length: 3:44
- Label: TEN; Epic
- Songwriters: Uzoechi Emenike; Zara Larsson; Markus Sepehrmanesh
- Producers: MNEK; Mike Spencer

Zara Larsson singles chronology
"This One's for You" (2016)	"Ain't My Fault" (2016)	"I Would Like" (2016)

Music video
- "Ain't My Fault" on YouTube

"Ain't My Fault" is a song by Swedish singer-songwriter Zara Larsson from her second studio album, So Good (2017). It was released on 2 September 2016 through TEN Music Group and Epic Records as the third single from the album. The song received positive reviews from critics upon its release and peaked at number one in Sweden, the top ten in Norway and Romania, and the top 20 in ten additional countries. It is certified Gold or higher in sixteen countries. The remix version of the song features American rapper Lil Yachty.

== Background ==
In an interview with Shazam, Larsson said about the first version of the song: "The topic is me talking to a girl about her man, and I basically stole her man, and I'm like, 'It's not my fault that I'm better than you'." The song was written in a few hours with MNEK for fun and never intended as a single, but when the studio loved it, her reaction was, "Whoa whoa whoa I can't sing this." So she changed the lyrics of the song to reflect her values: "I would never be proud of stealing a girl's man and sing about it, it would be very not me."

== Music video ==
The music video was released on 30 September 2016 via Larsson's official Vevo account. It was directed by Emil Nava and primarily features Larsson performing dance moves with backup dancers.

== Critical reception ==
Robbie Daw of Idolator stated the song is "a sexy departure from the somber dulcet tones of 'Never Forget You' and the sassy pop swagger of 'Lush Life'" and went on to call it a "Rihanna-esque banger" and a "saucy gem". Entertainment Weekly's Nolan Feeney called the song "bold" and "club-ready".

== Track listing ==
- Digital download
1. "Ain't My Fault" – 3:44
- Digital download
1. "Ain't My Fault" (J Hus & Fred VIP mix) – 3:31
- Digital download
1. "Ain't My Fault" (R3hab remix) – 2:38
- Digital download
1. "Ain't My Fault" (remix; featuring Lil Yachty) – 3:58

== Personnel ==
Credits were adapted from the liner notes of So Good.

- Major Toms Studio; London, United Kingdom

== Charts ==
=== Weekly charts ===
Chart (2016–2017)	Peak position
Australia (ARIA)	17
Austria (Ö3 Austria Top 40)	20
Belgium (Ultratop 50 Flanders)	26
Belgium (Ultratop 50 Wallonia)	44
Canada Hot 100 (Billboard)	46
Canada CHR/Top 40 (Billboard)	41
CIS Airplay (TopHit)	29
Czech Republic Airplay (ČNS IFPI)	20
Czech Republic Singles Digital (ČNS IFPI)	21
Denmark (Tracklisten)	15
Finland (Suomen virallinen lista)	13
France (SNEP)	110
France Airplay (SNEP)	31
Germany (GfK)	16
Hungary (Rádiós Top 40)	32
Ireland (IRMA)	17
Italy (FIMI)	50
Lebanon (Lebanese Top 20)	18
Mexico Airplay (Billboard)	42
Mexico Ingles Airplay (Billboard)	10
Netherlands (Dutch Top 40)	21
Netherlands (Single Top 100)	28
New Zealand (Recorded Music NZ)	19
Norway (VG-lista)	8
Poland Airplay (ZPAV)	54
Portugal (AFP)	28
Romania (Media Forest)	8
Scottish Singles Sales (Official Charts)	12
Slovakia Airplay (ČNS IFPI)	50
Slovakia Singles Digital (ČNS IFPI)	19
Spain (Promusicae)	58
Sweden (Sverigetopplistan)	1
Switzerland (Schweizer Hitparade)	43
UK Singles (Official Charts)	13
US Billboard Hot 100	76
US Pop Airplay (Billboard)	26

=== Year-end charts ===
Chart (2016)	Position
Australia (ARIA)	95
Germany (Official German Charts)	89
Sweden (Sverigetopplistan)	62

== Certifications ==
Region	Certification	Certified units/sales
Australia (ARIA)	2× Platinum	140,000^{‡}
Belgium (BRMA)	Gold	10,000^{‡}
Brazil (Pro-Música Brasil)	2× Platinum	120,000^{‡}
Canada (Music Canada)	2× Platinum	160,000^{‡}
Denmark (IFPI Danmark)	Platinum	90,000^{‡}
France (SNEP)	Gold	66,666^{‡}
Germany (BVMI)	Gold	200,000^{‡}
Hungary (MAHASZ)	2× Platinum	6,000^{‡}
Italy (FIMI)	Platinum	50,000^{‡}
Mexico (AMPROFON)	Gold	30,000^{‡}
New Zealand (RMNZ)	2× Platinum	60,000^{‡}
Norway (IFPI Norway)	2× Platinum	120,000^{‡}
Poland (ZPAV)	Platinum	20,000^{‡}
Spain (Promusicae)	Gold	30,000^{‡}
Sweden (GLF)	3× Platinum	120,000^{‡}
Switzerland (IFPI Switzerland)	Gold	10,000^{‡}
United Kingdom (BPI)	Platinum	600,000^{‡}
United States (RIAA)	Platinum	1,000,000^{‡}
^{‡} Sales+streaming figures based on certification alone.

== Release history ==
Region	Date	Format	Label	Ref.
Various	2 September 2016	Digital download	TEN; Epic; Sony	
United States	20 September 2016	Top 40 radio	Epic	
