= 2026 is the new 2016 =

Social media trend focused on 2016 culture

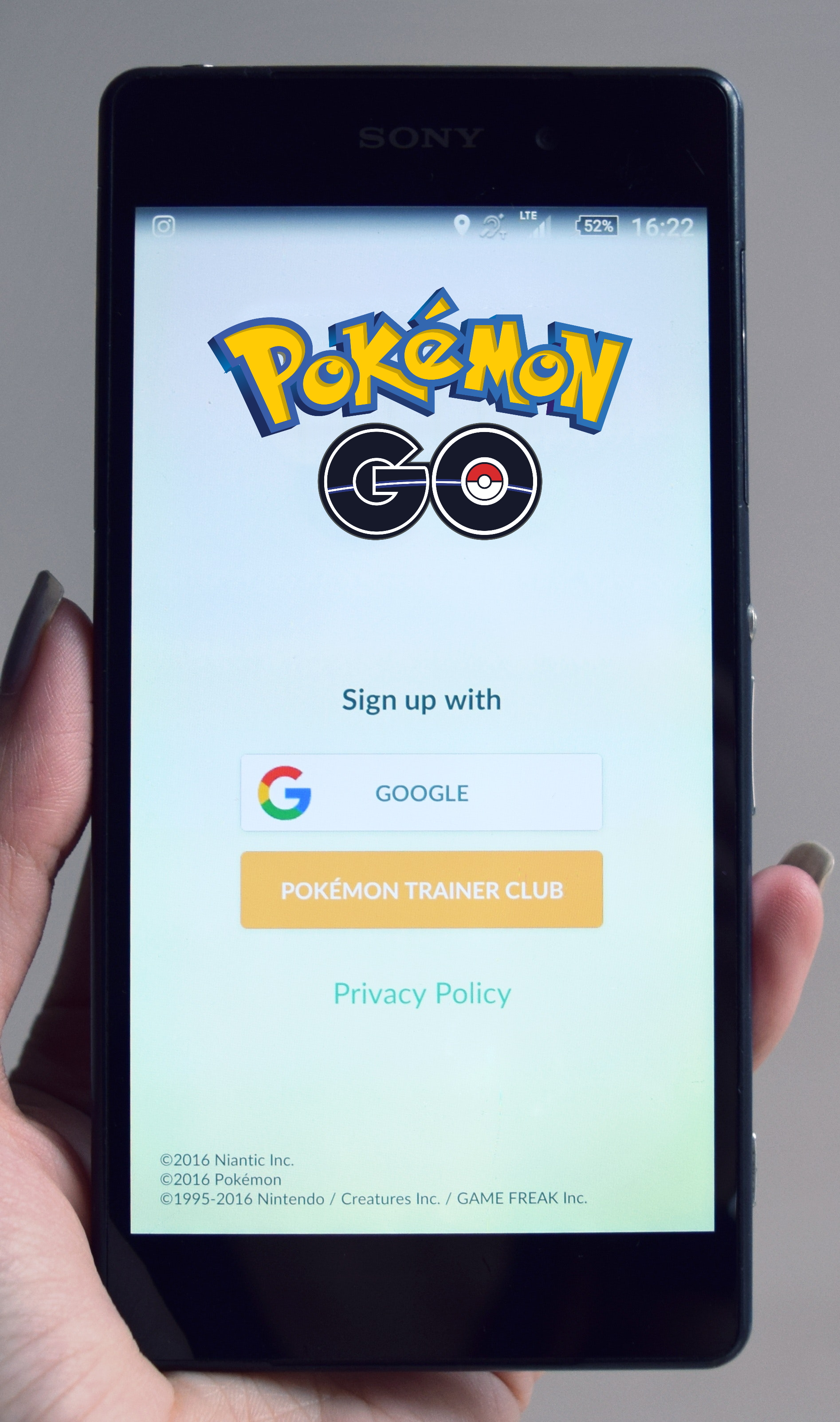
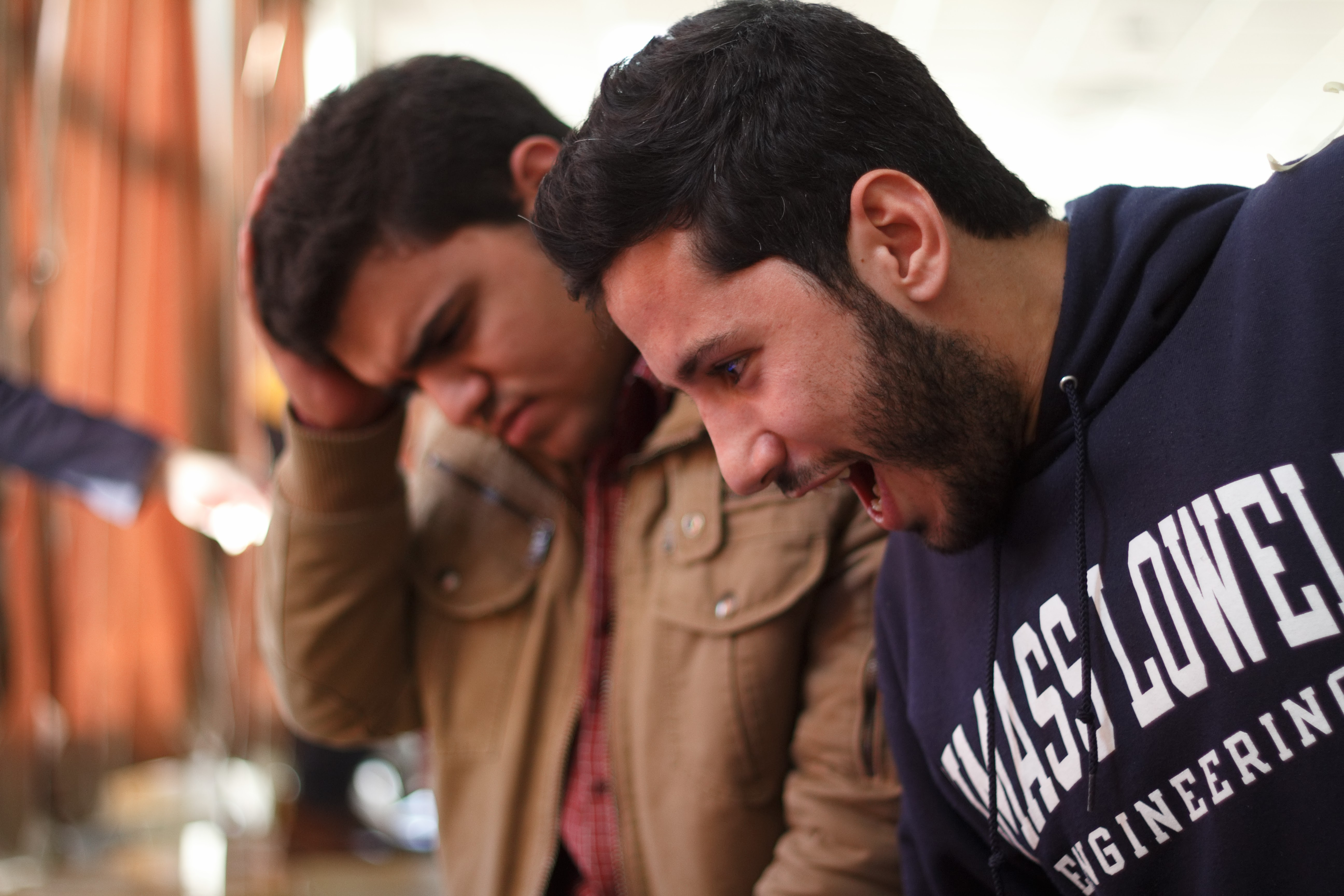
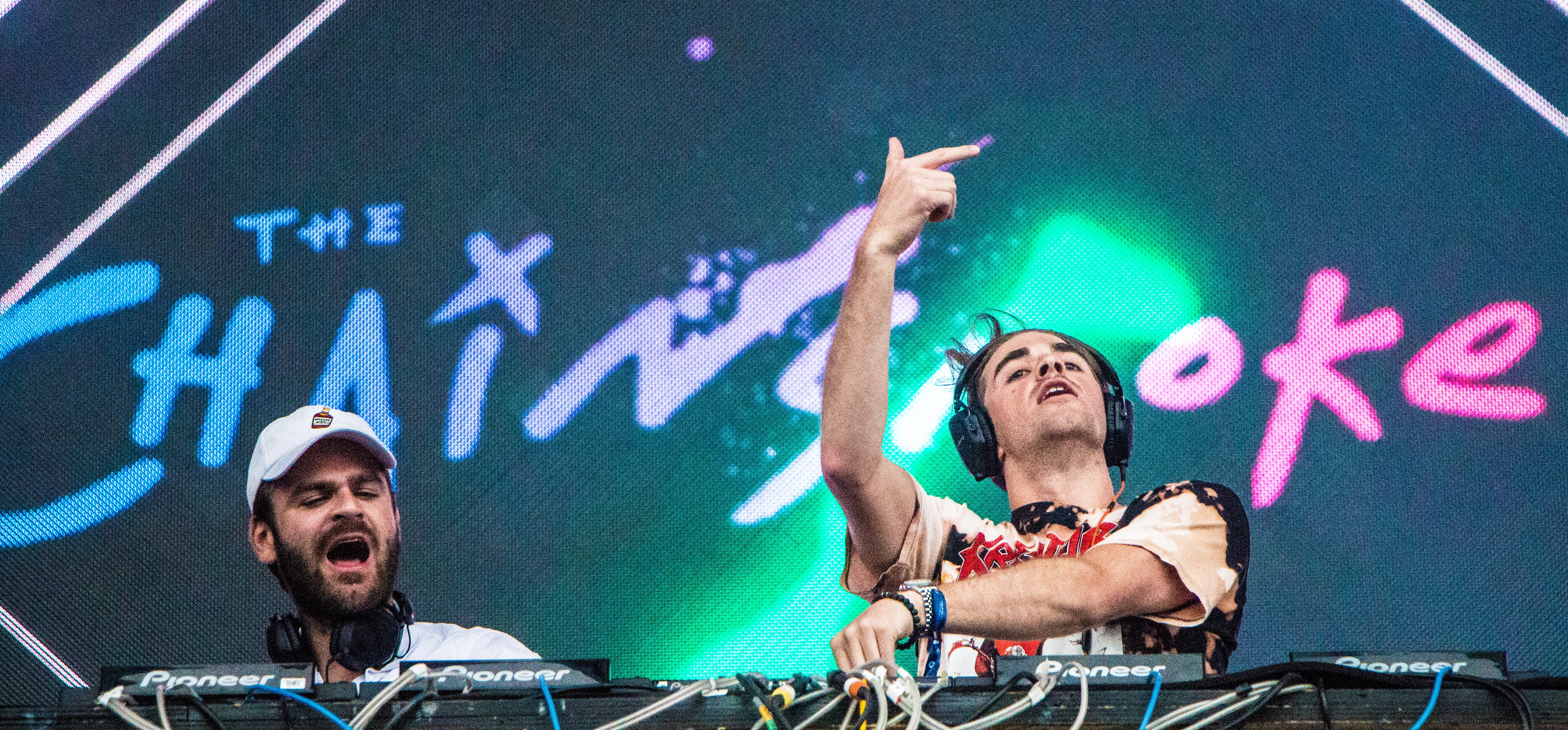
Items commonly associated with the social media trend, including Pokémon Go (top left), the Mannequin Challenge (top right), and EDM duo the Chainsmokers (bottom), popular in the year 2016

"2026 is the new 2016" is a phrase connected to a social media trend that started in late 2025 and became widely noticed in early 2026, where Internet users share posts showing the fashion, music, and online trends of 2016. It has appeared mainly on TikTok, Facebook, YouTube and Instagram and has been followed by online users, including celebrities and influencers. Many participants in the trend have shared where they were in 2016 or why the year mattered to them. It is also associated with the retro style and with oversaturated colours, including bright Instagram photos and Snapchat filters that were popular at the time.

The phrase looks back to the years before the COVID-19 pandemic and the use of generative artificial intelligence to create content became common. In 2016, people used apps like Dubsmash and Vine, and popular events included the Mannequin Challenge. Successful songs by Drake, the Weeknd, Justin Bieber, and the Chainsmokers were released. In narrative media, Marvel Studios's Captain America: Civil War was released and Netflix released the first season of Stranger Things. Zootopia, Rogue One, Moana, La La Land and Deadpool were other prominent films released that year.

The hashtag #BringBack2016 became popular as people recalled mid-2010s trends. Reports noted increased searches for "2016" on TikTok and growing use of 2016-style filters, as well as renewed interest in Spotify playlists titled 2016.

== Origin and spread ==
The phrase appeared online in late December 2025 and became popular at the start of 2026, 9–10 years after 2016, which many in Generation Z remember. The trend gained attention in December 2025 through the Great Meme Reset, a social media movement, when searches for it increased worldwide. On December 31, TikTok user @taybrafang posted a video featuring a montage of popular 2016 moments and items from that year. Another TikTok user, @joebro909, proposed January 1, 2026, as a "reset day" to bring back internet trends from 2016. People shared old photos, videos, and collections showing mid-2010s trends. Common visuals were Snapchat puppy-dog and flower-crown filters, very bright selfies, and low-resolution photos typical of early iPhone cameras.

TikTok helped the trend spread. Users recreated or referenced viral moments from 2016, including the Bottle Flip Challenge, the Mannequin Challenge, Niantic's Pokémon Go, dabbing and internet memes like "catch me outside, how 'bout dat." The BBC reported that searches for "2016" on TikTok increased sharply in the first weeks of 2026, and millions of videos used filters from that time.

Buoyed by social media, "Lush Life" by Zara Larsson returned to international music charts after experiencing a resurgence in widespread global popularity in early 2026 after initially being an international hit song in 2016. Billboard likened the song's resurgence in popularity and the renewed interest in Zara Larsson to the broader 2016 nostalgia trend present in 2026.

== Reception ==
The phrase was criticized for looking back at 2016 for fun rather than its major events. Taylor Delandro of Nexstar Media Group wrote that the wave of nostalgia is fueled by the idea that "2026 is the new 2016", with many hoping the current year will reflect what they remember as a positive time. Writing for Vogue, Madeleine Schulz said that people's renewed focus on 2016 was mainly about fashion, music, and social media trends, not political events like Brexit or the 2016 United States presidential election.

In an analysis published by The Washington Post, Shane O'Neill and Haben Kelati discussed why 2016 continues to resonate online. Kelati said she remembers the year fondly, while O'Neill expressed skepticism about idealizing it. They examined how generational perspective shapes reactions to the trend and why it gained attention in early 2026.

== See also ==
- Anemoia
- Good old days
- Rosy retrospection
