= This One's for You (David Guetta song) =

Single by David Guetta featuring Zara Larsson
- Released: 13 May 2016
- Genre: EDM
- Length: 3:27
- Label: Parlophone; Epic
- Songwriters: David Guetta; Giorgio Tuinfort; Nick van de Wall; Esther Dean; Thomas Troelsen
- Producers: David Guetta; Giorgio Tuinfort; Afrojack

David Guetta singles chronology
"No Worries" (2016)	"This One's for You" (2016)	"All the Way Up" (remix) (2016)

Zara Larsson singles chronology
"Girls Like" (2016)	"This One's for You" (2016)	"Ain't My Fault" (2016)

Music video
- "This One's for You" on YouTube

"This One's for You" is a song by French DJ and record producer David Guetta, featuring Swedish singer Zara Larsson. It was released on 13 May 2016 as the official song of the UEFA Euro 2016 held in France. The track was recorded with the help of one million fans around the world through a special online app, and American singer Ariana Grande also recorded a demo for the song. The song is included as a bonus track on the Japanese edition of Larsson's second studio album So Good (2017).

Commercially, "This One's For You" became a worldwide hit, debuting at number 13 in France and topped the French Singles Chart in the issue of the June 18, 2016, becoming Guetta's fourth number one and Larsson's first in the country. The song also peaked at number one in Germany, Mexico, Portugal and Switzerland, reached the top ten in Larsson's hometown, Sweden, at number three, also in Austria, Belgium, Hungary, Israel, Norway, Slovenia, the Netherlands, Slovakia, Italy and Finland, top twenty in Denmark, Spain and United Kingdom and top forty in Ukraine.

== Music video ==
The video of the song was released on June 10, 2016, on YouTube. The song's music video was presented by Turkish Airlines.

== Live performances ==
Guetta and Larsson performed the single during the opening and closing ceremonies of the UEFA Euro 2016 – in Guetta's native country, France – in addition to holding a free concert in Paris on the Champ de Mars, underneath the Eiffel Tower, on 9 June 2016.

== Track listing ==
Digital download
No.	Title	Length
1.	"This One's for You" (featuring Zara Larsson)	3:27

CD Single
No.	Title	Length
1.	"This One's for You" (featuring Zara Larsson)	3:27
2.	"This One's for You" (Instrumental) (featuring Zara Larsson)	3:27

Digital download – Remixes EP
No.	Title	Length
1.	"This One's for You" (featuring Zara Larsson) (Extended)	4:37
2.	"This One's for You" (featuring Zara Larsson) (Kungs Remix)	4:15
3.	"This One's for You" (featuring Zara Larsson) (Stefan Dabruck Remix)	5:03
4.	"This One's for You" (featuring Zara Larsson) (GLOWINTHEDARK Remix)	3:20
5.	"This One's for You" (featuring Zara Larsson) (Kris Kross Amsterdam Remix)	3:06
6.	"This One's for You" (featuring Zara Larsson) (Faustix Remix)	3:04
7.	"This One's for You" (featuring Zara Larsson) (Stefan Dabruck Remix Radio Edit)	3:07
8.	"This One's for You" (featuring Zara Larsson) (Baptiste Silva Remix)	3:23

== Credits and personnel ==
- David Guetta – producer, instruments
- Zara Larsson – featuring artist, lead vocals
- Giorgio Tuinfort – producer, instruments, piano
- Afrojack – producer, instruments
- Ester Dean – songwriter
- Daddy's Groove – programming, mixer, master engineer
- Emanuel Abrahamsson – vocal producer, recording engineer
- Thomas Troelsen – assistant producer
- Elio Debets – backing vocals, vocal recording engineer
- Rob Bekhuis, Eelco Bakker, Earl St. Clair, James Bloniarz, Quinn Garrett, Sean Bacastow and One Million Voices of Fans around the World – background vocals

== Charts ==
=== Weekly charts ===
Chart (2016)	Peak position
Australia (ARIA)	67
Austria (Ö3 Austria Top 40)	2
Belgium (Ultratop 50 Flanders)	10
Belgium (Ultratop 50 Wallonia)	2
Canada Hot 100 (Billboard)	62
CIS Airplay (TopHit)	81
Czech Republic Airplay (ČNS IFPI)	10
Czech Republic Singles Digital (ČNS IFPI)	9
Denmark (Tracklisten)	11
Euro Digital Song Sales (Billboard)	3
Finland (Suomen virallinen lista)	10
France (SNEP)	1
Germany (GfK)	1
Germany (Airplay Chart)	2
Hungary (Dance Top 40)	7
Hungary (Rádiós Top 40)	16
Hungary (Single Top 40)	4
Ireland (IRMA)	10
Israel International Airplay (Media Forest)	4
Israel International TV Airplay (Media Forest)	1
Italy (FIMI)	8
Japan (Billboard Japan Hot Overseas)	13
Latvia (Latvijas Top 40)	11
Lebanon (Lebanese Top 20)	6
Luxembourg Digital Songs (Billboard)	1
Mexico Ingles Airplay (Billboard)	1
Mexico Top 20 Inglés (Monitor Latino)	13
Netherlands (Single Top 100)	6
Netherlands (Dutch Top 40)	5
Norway (VG-lista)	4
Poland Airplay (ZPAV)	11
Poland Dance (ZPAV)	4
Portugal (AFP)	1
Romania (Airplay 100)	45
Russia Airplay (Tophit)	81
Scottish Singles Sales (Official Charts)	13
Slovakia Airplay (ČNS IFPI)	34
Slovakia Singles Digital (ČNS IFPI)	6
Slovenia (SloTop50)	5
Spain (Promusicae)	12
Sweden (Sverigetopplistan)	3
Switzerland (Schweizer Hitparade)	1
UK Singles (Official Charts)	16
UK Dance (Official Charts)	7
Ukraine (Tophit)	31
US Hot Dance/Electronic Songs (Billboard)	11

=== Year-end charts ===
Chart (2016)	Position
Austria (Ö3 Austria Top 40)	34
Belgium (Ultratop Flanders)	51
Belgium (Ultratop Wallonia)	19
Denmark (Tracklisten)	66
France (SNEP)	26
Germany (Official German Charts)	42
Italy (FIMI)	32
Netherlands (Dutch Top 40)	39
Netherlands (Single Top 100)	52
Spain (PROMUSICAE)	72
Sweden (Sverigetopplistan)	28
Switzerland (Schweizer Hitparade)	30
US Dance/Electronic Songs (Billboard)	33

== Certifications ==
Region	Certification	Certified units/sales
Austria (IFPI Austria)	Gold	15,000^{‡}
Belgium (BRMA)	Platinum	20,000^{‡}
Denmark (IFPI Danmark)	Platinum	90,000^{‡}
France (SNEP)	Diamond	233,333^{‡}
Germany (BVMI)	Gold	200,000^{‡}
Italy (FIMI)	3× Platinum	150,000^{‡}
New Zealand (RMNZ)	Gold	15,000^{‡}
Norway (IFPI Norway)	2× Platinum	80,000^{‡}
Poland (ZPAV)	Platinum	50,000^{‡}
Portugal (AFP)	Platinum	10,000^{‡}
Spain (Promusicae)	Platinum	40,000^{‡}
Switzerland (IFPI Switzerland)	Gold	15,000^{‡}
United Kingdom (BPI)	Gold	400,000^{‡}
United States (RIAA)	Gold	500,000^{‡}
^{‡} Sales+streaming figures based on certification alone.

== Release history ==
Region	Date	Format	Label
France	13 May 2016	Digital download	Parlophone; Epic
Worldwide	13 May 2016	Digital download	Parlophone; Epic
Germany	10 June 2016	CD single	Warner
