= I Would Like =

Single by Zara Larsson

from the album So Good
- Released: 11 November 2016
- Studio: RBD (North Hollywood, California)
- Length: 3:46
- Label: TEN; Epic; Sony
- Songwriters: James Abrahart; Alexander Izquierdo; Marcus Lomax; Stefan Johnson; Jordan Johnson; Oliver Peterhof; Zara Larsson; Karen Chin; Anthony Kelly
- Producers: The Monsters & Strangerz; German

Zara Larsson singles chronology
"Ain't My Fault" (2016)	"I Would Like" (2016)	"So Good" (2017)

Lyric video
- "I Would Like" on YouTube

"I Would Like" is a song by Swedish singer Zara Larsson. It was released on 11 November 2016 through TEN Music Group and Epic Records as the fourth single from her second studio album, So Good (2017). Recorded at RBD Studios, the song was co-written by Larsson, James Abrahart, Marcus Lomax, Stefan Johnson and among others, as well as produced by the Monsters & Strangerz and German.

"I Would Like" has a sample of "Dat Sexy Body" by Jamaican singer Sasha. Larsson performed the single at The X Factor in December 2016. Commercially, it had peaked at number 2 in UK Singles Chart and number 4 in her native country Sweden.

== Background and live performance ==
After releasing several previous singles, Larsson release "I Would Like" as the fourth single from her second studio album So Good, released in 2017. Larsson sampled "Dat Sexy Body" from the Jamaican singer Sasha for the song. On 4 December 2016, she performed the song at the thirteenth series of The X Factor.

== Commercial performance ==
On 30 December, "I Would Like" peaked at number two in UK Singles Chart, making it her then-highest-charting single in the UK at the time. The song peaked at number 4 in her native country, Sweden.

== Track listing ==
- Digital download
1. "I Would Like" – 3:44
- Digital download
1. "I Would Like" (R3hab remix) – 2:27
- Digital download
1. "I Would Like" (Gorgon City remix) – 4:23

== Personnel ==
Credits were adapted from the liner notes of So Good.

Recording locations

- RBD Studios; North Hollywood, California

Personnel

- James Abrahart — songwriter
- Alexander Izquierdo — songwriter
- Marcus Lomax — songwriter, background vocals
- Stefan Johnson — songwriter
- Jordan Johnson — songwriter
- Oliver Peterhof — songwriter
- Zara Larsson — performer, songwriter
- Karen Chin — songwriter
- Anthony Kelly — songwriter
- The Monsters & Strangerz — producer
- German — producer
- James Abrahart — background vocals
- Phil Tan — mixer

== Charts ==
=== Weekly charts ===
Chart (2016–17)	Peak position
Australia (ARIA)	16
Austria (Ö3 Austria Top 40)	72
Belgium (Ultratip Bubbling Under Flanders)	1
Belgium (Ultratip Bubbling Under Wallonia)	12
Canada Hot 100 (Billboard)	68
CIS Airplay (TopHit)	142
Czech Republic Airplay (ČNS IFPI)	99
Czech Republic Singles Digital (ČNS IFPI)	38
Denmark (Tracklisten)	23
Euro Digital Songs (Billboard)	3
Finland Download (Latauslista)	24
Germany (GfK)	56
Ireland (IRMA)	7
Italy (FIMI)	69
Lebanon (Lebanese Top 20)	16
Mexico Ingles Airplay (Billboard)	17
Netherlands (Dutch Top 40)	23
Netherlands (Single Top 100)	28
New Zealand (Recorded Music NZ)	19
Norway (VG-lista)	23
Poland Airplay (ZPAV)	27
Portugal (AFP)	38
Scottish Singles Sales (Official Charts)	3
Slovakia Airplay (ČNS IFPI)	50
Slovakia Singles Digital (ČNS IFPI)	77
Spain (PROMUSICAE)	92
Sweden (Sverigetopplistan)	4
Switzerland (Schweizer Hitparade)	55
UK Singles (Official Charts)	2
US Digital Song Sales (Billboard)	48

=== Year-end charts ===
Chart (2017)	Position
Sweden (Sverigetopplistan)	88
UK Singles (OCC)	60

== Certifications ==
Region	Certification	Certified units/sales
Australia (ARIA)	2× Platinum	140,000^{‡}
Brazil (Pro-Música Brasil)	Gold	30,000^{‡}
Canada (Music Canada)	Platinum	80,000^{‡}
Denmark (IFPI Danmark)	Platinum	90,000^{‡}
Italy (FIMI)	Gold	25,000^{‡}
New Zealand (RMNZ)	Platinum	30,000^{‡}
Norway (IFPI Norway)	Platinum	60,000^{‡}
Poland (ZPAV)	Gold	10,000^{‡}
Sweden (GLF)	Platinum	40,000^{‡}
Switzerland (IFPI Switzerland)	Gold	10,000^{‡}
United Kingdom (BPI)	Platinum	600,000^{‡}
United States (RIAA)	Gold	500,000^{‡}
^{‡} Sales+streaming figures based on certification alone.

== Release history ==
Region	Date	Format	Label	Ref.
Various	11 November 2016	Digital download; streaming	TEN; Epic; Sony	
