= Dat Sexy Body =

Single by Sasha
- Released: 1998
- Recorded: 1998
- Genre: Dancehall
- Length: 3:20
- Label: VP, Atlantic
- Songwriters: Karen Chin, Anthony Kelly
- Producer: Tony "CD" Kelly

Sasha singles chronology
"Kill The Bitch" (1993)	"Dat Sexy Body" (1998)	"I'm Still In Love With You" (2004)

Ivy Queen singles chronology
"Papi Te Quiero" (2004)	"Dat Sexy Body" (2004)	"Chika Ideal" (2004)

Audio sample
- A 28 second sample of "Dat Sexy Body" featuring the chorus performed by Sasha and part of Sasha's second verse.: file; help

"Dat Sexy Body" is a song recorded by Jamaican deejay Sasha. It was released in 1998, and became a sleeper hit as only gained chart success five years after its release. The song was composed by Sasha and Anthony Kelly who also handled production of the song under his stage name Tony "CD" Kelly. The song itself is recorded over a variation of the bookshelf riddim. A music video for the song was also filmed. Two officials remixes, one with reggaeton performer Ivy Queen and another with Fatman Scoop remixed by Excel Mixmaster was also recorded and released in 2004.

In 2016, the song was sampled in Zara Larsson's song "I Would Like" and in 2017, the song was sampled in Pitbull and Jennifer Lopez's song "Sexy Body".

== Background ==
Sasha, a deejay, had released a single entitled "Kill The Bitch" while she was in her teens which was commercially unsuccessful. Her debut studio album, Come Again was also a flop. The remix to "Dat Sexy Body", Sasha's first commercially successful single, features the reggaetón singer-songwriter Ivy Queen. As Ivy Queen's fan base continued to grow, she attracted Sasha who invited her to record the song. According to Murray Elias of VP Records: "Ivy Queen is kind of rough and Sasha has a more feminine, playful approach, so those two styles blend well, this could be a breakthrough record for Ivy Queen, where you see the Jamaican market embracing the reggaetón vibe."

== Composition ==
"Dat Sexy Body" was composed by Karen Chin, Martha Pesante, Ernesto Roberts and Anthony Kelly. Production was handled by Kelly, under his stage name Tony "CD" Kelly. Additional production was provided by Murray "M Diddy" Elias while Philip Smart served as recording engineer as well as Dave Hyman. A hip-hop remix produced by DJ Excel The Mixmaster NYC with Fatman Scoop was later recorded and released in 2004 as "Coca Cola Shape" while a reggaetón remix with Ivy Queen was also included.

== Chart performance ==
The song did moderately well in France peaking at #31 on its SNEP Singles chart. On the Billboard Hot R&B/Hip-Hop Songs chart, "Dat Sexy Body" debuted for the week of August 30, 2003. It peaked at #78 on the chart for the week of September 13, 2003. The song ended its reign on the chart for the issue week of November 1, 2003 after spending eight consecutive weeks on the chart. This is Ivy Queen's first and only single to appear on the Billboard Hot R&B/Hip-Hop Songs chart, however she has had songs on the Billboard Hot 100 and Rhythmic Top 40.

== Charts ==
Chart (2004)	Position
France (SNEP)	31
US Hot R&B/Hip-Hop Songs (Billboard)	78
