= So Good World Tour =

2017–18 concert tour by Zara Larsson

- Tour by Zara Larsson
- Associated album: So Good
- Start date: October 13, 2017
- End date: March 23, 2018
- Legs: 1
- No. of shows: 16 in Europe; 6 in South America; 22 in total

Zara Larsson concert chronology
- So Good World Tour (2017–2018); Don't Worry Bout Me Tour (2019)

The So Good World Tour was the first major concert tour by Swedish singer Zara Larsson, in support of her second studio album, So Good (2017). The tour began on October 13, 2017, in Reykjavík and concluded on March 23, 2018 in São Paulo.

== Background ==
Before the tour beginning, Larsson toured with Clean Bandit on their North American Tour 2017, across the United States and Canada. Larsson also performed at several major music festivals, including Lollapalooza, in Chicago, Summer Sonic Festival, in Japan and BBC Radio 1's Big Weekend, Parklife 2017, Capital's Summertime Ball and Wireless Festival, in England.

Daði Freyr, Wild Youth, Taya and Juliander were announced as supporting acts.

== Critical response ==
In a review for BelfastLive, Sheena McStravick wrote: "Larsson let her talent do the talking" on a "highly energetic and incredible vocal display". McStravick also highlighted the "minimal" stage production, which included her band, two backing vocalists and four backing dancers, saying: "there were no fancy sets or objects dangling from the ceiling, it was simply lighting effects and the vocals of one immensely talented teenager". The reviewer added: "not to mention the fantastically choreographed dance routines, Larsson maintained pitch perfect vocals while simultaneously performing high energy routines".

== Shows ==
List of concerts, showing date, city, country, venue, opening acts, tickets sold, number of available tickets and amount of gross revenue
Date	City	Country	Venue	Opening acts	Attendance	Revenue
Europe
October 13, 2017	Reykjavík	Iceland	Laugardalshöll	Daði Freyr	2,970 / 2,970	$40,639
October 15, 2017	Belfast	Northern Ireland	Waterfront Hall	Wild Youth	2,227 / 2,227	$37,831
October 17, 2017 (Note: The concert of October 17, 2017 at Olympia Theatre in Dublin was originally scheduled to take place on October 16, 2017, but was postponed due to Hurricane Ophelia.)	Dublin	Ireland	Olympia Theatre	Wild Youth	—	—
October 18, 2017	Glasgow	Scotland	O_{2} Academy Glasgow	Taya	—	—
October 19, 2017	Newcastle	England	O2 Academy Newcastle	Taya	—	—
October 21, 2017	Manchester	England	O_{2} Apollo Manchester	Taya	—	—
October 22, 2017	Leeds	England	O_{2} Academy Leeds	Taya	—	—
October 24, 2017	London	England	Eventim Apollo	Taya	3,108 / 3,244	$102,490
October 25, 2017	Birmingham	England	O_{2} Academy Birmingham	Taya	—	—
October 27, 2017	Portsmouth	England	Portsmouth Guildhall	Juliander	—	—
October 28, 2017	Westcliff-on-Sea	England	Cliffs Pavilion	Juliander	—	—
October 30, 2017	Frankfurt	Germany	Jahrhunderthalle	Juliander	—	—
October 31, 2017	Amsterdam	Netherlands	AFAS Live	Juliander	—	—
November 2, 2017	Zurich	Switzerland	Halle 622	Juliander	—	—
November 3, 2017	Munich	Germany	Tonhalle	Juliander	—	—
November 4, 2017 (Note: The concert of November 4, 2017 at Fabrique in Milan was originally scheduled to take place on November 4, 2017, but was postponed due to scheduling changes.)	Milan	Italy	Fabrique	Juliander	—	—
South America
15 March 2018	Buenos Aires	Argentina	Niceto Club	Oh Wonder	—	—
16 March 2018^{[A]}	Buenos Aires	Argentina	Hipódromo de San Isidro	—	—	—
17 March 2018^{[B]}	Santiago	Chile	Parque O'Higgins	—	—	—
20 March 2018	Rio de Janeiro	Brazil	Circo Voador	Oh Wonder	—	—
22 March 2018	São Paulo	Brazil	Audio Club	Oh Wonder	773 / 2,994	$28,999
23 March 2018^{[C]}	São Paulo	Brazil	Autódromo José Carlos Pace	—	300,000 / 300,000	$23,099,200
Total:					—	—

Festivals and other miscellaneous performances
^{[A]}This concert was part of the "Lollapalooza Festival"
^{[B]}This concert was part of the "Lollapalooza Festival"
^{[C]}This concert was part of the "Lollapalooza Festival"

=== Cancelled shows ===
Date	City	Country	Venue	Reason
November 5, 2017	Berlin	Germany	Tempodrom	Scheduling changes
November 6, 2017	Hamburg	Germany	Mehr! Theatre	Scheduling changes
