= So Good (Zara Larsson song) =

Single by Zara Larsson featuring Ty Dolla Sign

from the album So Good
- Released: 27 January 2017
- Studio: Windmark (Santa Monica, California)
- Genre: R&B
- Length: 2:47
- Label: TEN; Epic
- Songwriters: Charlie Puth; Jacob Kasher Hindlin; Gamal Lewis; Danny Schofield
- Producer: Charlie Puth

Zara Larsson singles chronology
"I Would Like" (2016)	"So Good" (2017)	"Symphony" (2017)

Ty Dolla $ign singles chronology
"Fallen" (2017)	"So Good" (2017)	"Ain't Nothing" (2017)

Music video
- "So Good" on YouTube

"So Good" is a song by Swedish singer Zara Larsson, featuring American singer Ty Dolla Sign. It was released on 27 January 2017 by TEN Music Group and Epic Records as the fifth single from her second studio album of the same name (2017). It reached the top ten in the Netherlands and Sweden, as well as the top 40 in Denmark, Finland, and Norway.

== Background and release ==
On 16 January 2017, Larsson announced that her next single would be named "So Good" and would feature Ty Dolla $ign. She released the song on 27 January, co-written by Charlie Puth. A music video for the song premiered on 3 February 2017, directed by Sarah McColgan.

== Live performances ==
Larsson and Ty Dolla Sign performed "So Good" live for the first time on The Ellen DeGeneres Show on 7 February 2017. They also performed the song together on The Wendy Williams Show on 23 March. On 4 April, she performed an acoustic version of the song in James Corden's The Late Late Show.

== Track listing ==
- Digital download
1. "So Good" (featuring Ty Dolla Sign) – 2:46
- Digital download
1. "So Good" (featuring Ty Dolla Sign) (Goldhouse remix) – 3:25
- Digital download
1. "So Good" (The Wild remix) – 3:45

== Personnel ==
Credits were adapted from the liner notes of So Good.

Recording locations

- Windmark Recording; Santa Monica, California

== Charts ==
Chart (2017)	Peak position
Australia (ARIA)	59
Belgium (Ultratip Bubbling Under Flanders)	2
Belgium (Ultratip Bubbling Under Wallonia)	19
Denmark (Tracklisten)	30
Finland (Suomen virallinen latauslista)	24
France (SNEP)	160
Germany (GfK)	99
Ireland (IRMA)	91
Israel (Media Forest TV Airplay)	1
Japan Hot 100 (Billboard)	71
Netherlands (Tipparade)	4
New Zealand Heatseekers (Recorded Music NZ)	2
Norway (VG-lista)	27
Scottish Singles Sales (Official Charts)	27
Slovakia Airplay (ČNS IFPI)	72
Sweden (Sverigetopplistan)	7
Switzerland (Schweizer Hitparade)	89
UK Singles (Official Charts)	44
US Pop Airplay (Billboard)	39

== Certifications ==
Region	Certification	Certified units/sales
Australia (ARIA)	Gold	35,000^{‡}
Canada (Music Canada)	Gold	40,000^{‡}
New Zealand (RMNZ)	Gold	15,000^{‡}
Norway (IFPI Norway)	Gold	20,000^{‡}
Sweden (GLF)	Gold	20,000^{‡}
United Kingdom (BPI)	Silver	200,000^{‡}
^{‡} Sales+streaming figures based on certification alone.
