= Symphony (Clean Bandit song) =

Single by Clean Bandit featuring Zara Larsson

from the album What Is Love?
- Released: 17 March 2017
- Recorded: 2016
- Studio: Club Ralph (London); Metropolis (London)
- Genre: Dance-pop; orchestral pop
- Length: 3:32
- Label: Atlantic; Epic
- Songwriters: Jack Patterson; Ammar Malik; Ina Wroldsen; Steve Mac
- Producers: Clean Bandit; Mark Ralph

Clean Bandit singles chronology
"Rockabye" (2016)	"Symphony" (2017)	"Disconnect" (2017)

Zara Larsson singles chronology
"So Good" (2017)	"Symphony" (2017)	"Don't Let Me Be Yours" (2017)

Music video
- "Symphony" on YouTube

"Symphony" is a song by British band Clean Bandit, featuring Swedish singer Zara Larsson. It was released on 17 March 2017—the same day as Larsson's second studio album, So Good, where it includes as a bonus track—as the second single from Clean Bandit's second studio album, What Is Love? (2018). Jack Patterson, Ammar Malik, Ina Wroldsen, and Steve Mac wrote the song, while Clean Bandit and Mark Ralph produced it.

"Symphony" peaked at the top of the UK Singles Chart, becoming Larsson's first number one on the chart and Clean Bandit's third. Outside the United Kingdom, the single also topped the chart in Larsson's native Sweden, as well as in neighbouring Norway, and reached the top 10 in seventeen additional countries. It is certified Diamond in France and Poland, as well as Platinum or higher in fifteen additional countries.

== Release and composition ==
"Symphony" was released on 17 March 2017, same day of Larsson's second studio album So Good's release. The album features the song as a bonus track. "Symphony" is a dance-pop and orchestral pop song which has a duration of over three-and-a-half minutes.

== Music video ==
The music video for "Symphony" premiered the same day the song was released, on March 17, 2017. It was directed by Clean Bandit's members Grace Chatto and Jack Patterson. The directors have explained in the "Making of" video and in interviews that the video features a gay couple and "tells the tragic story of a conductor who loses his boyfriend in a bicycle crash. The conductor leads the symphony orchestra that [Clean Bandit and Zara Larsson] are part of." Larsson has spoken about why they wanted to specifically feature a black gay couple in the video, and she has said that she finds it ridiculous that people continue to illogically read the couple as being brothers or father and son.

The video begins at dusk near Rotherhithe, accompanied to sound of an orchestra tuning up; meanwhile a young man packs away his laptop and briskly rides away, with no lighting, on a pedal bike. At the hall, during a hiatus, Zara's gaze lowers as sirens penetrate silence from faraway at the static crash cordon aftermath observed by an aerial view. Subsequent scenes show the man and his partner engaged in various activities, intercalated by scenes of the surviving partner grieving and visiting the spots they used to go together. The surviving partner paints the departed partner's bike white all-over and fixes it somewhere nearby where the fatality happened. He also begins to write music again as we find out he is a composer and his late partner was his inspiration. By the end, he has composed a beautiful symphony in his late partner's memory. The video ends with him looking out into the crowd while his deceased partner looks on proudly. The conductor is played by Michael Akinsulire and his deceased partner / boyfriend is played by Josias Bertrand, while the orchestra scene takes place at the Royal Festival Hall.

As of June 2026, the video has over 1.4 billion views on YouTube.

== Live performances ==
Clean Bandit and Larsson gave their first live performance of the song on The Voice UK on 18 March 2017, and a performance on The Tonight Show Starring Jimmy Fallon followed on 21 April. On August 14, a live performance of the song at the Teen Choice Awards 2017 event was uploaded on the band's YouTube channel.

== Notable uses ==
An edited version of the track was used in the BBC's Christmas 2017 short film and idents celebrating spending Christmas together. They were broadcast on BBC One during December 2017. It was covered by BAFTA-winning actress Suranne Jones, accompanied by a choir from the Youth Theatre group of the Half Moon Theatre, for a 2019 Children in Need charity album titled Got it Covered.

In 2021, the song performed by Strictly Come Dancing's house band, was used in week eight of the show to accompany a dance by Rose Ayling-Ellis and Giovanni Pernice. The performance, which included a period of silence in reference to Ayling-Ellis's deafness, scored 39 points out of a possible 40 and received widespread praise, with judge Anton Du Beke described it as "the greatest thing (he had) seen on the show". They performed the routine again in the final, scoring a perfect 40 points and winning the competition. Their performance earned the dancers Heat magazine's 2021 Unmissables Award for TV Moment of the Year and the 2022 BAFTA TV Award for Must-See Moment.

Singer-songwriter Astrid S released a Norwegian-language version of the song called "Symfoni" as part of the 2025 series of the TV show Hver gang vi møtes. The show challenges artists to produce new interpretations of songs by other artists, with "Symfoni" performed in the context of the appearance of Ina Wroldsen, a co-writer of the original song. The cover, produced by Anders Kjær, reached position six on the Norwegian singles chart.

== Virality ==
In August 2024, "Symphony" resurged in popularity more than seven years after its original release due to a viral meme on TikTok featuring a painting of "Enjoy Sunshine" by Christian Riese Lassen that shows a lively picture of dolphins and unicorns, often alongside Larsson's part in the song: "I just wanna be part of your symphony". The effect arose from the contrasting captions, such as "I have depression". Users found it amusing and commented on the irony of writing about personal problems while the upbeat song plays. The meme was inspired by TikTok posts showcasing diaries with cartoonish women on their covers doing ballet. When opened, these diaries play Larsson's part in the song.

Larsson reacted to the trend, posting a TikTok video with the same painting with the text, reading: "What the fuck is happening". Clean Bandit also responded to the meme calling it "inspiring". Due to the growing popularity of the meme, the song reached number one on the Tiktok Billboard Top 50 chart dated 31 August 2024.

== Track listing ==
- CD single
1. "Symphony" (featuring Zara Larsson) – 3:32
2. "Symphony" (acoustic; featuring Zara Larsson) – 3:36
- Digital download
1. "Symphony" (featuring Zara Larsson) – 3:32
- Digital download – acoustic version
1. "Symphony" (featuring Zara Larsson) (acoustic version) – 3:36
- Digital download – alternative version
1. "Symphony" (featuring Zara Larsson) (alternative version) – 3:32
- Digital download – MK remix
1. "Symphony" (featuring Zara Larsson) (MK remix) – 4:55
- Digital download – R3hab remix
1. "Symphony" (featuring Zara Larsson) (R3hab remix) – 2:39
- Digital download – Cash Cash remix
1. "Symphony" (featuring Zara Larsson) (Cash Cash remix) – 4:13

- Digital download – Sem Thomasson remix
1. "Symphony" (featuring Zara Larsson) (Sem Thomasson remix) – 5:14
- Digital download – Lodato & Joseph Duveen remix
1. "Symphony" (featuring Zara Larsson) (Lodato & Joseph Duveen remix) – 3:36
- Digital download – James Hype remix
1. "Symphony" (featuring Zara Larsson) (James Hype remix) – 3:24
- Digital download – Dash Berlin remix
1. "Symphony" (featuring Zara Larsson) (Dash Berlin remix) – 3:04
- Digital download – Coldabank remix
1. "Symphony" (featuring Zara Larsson) (Coldabank remix) – 3:59

== Charts ==
=== Weekly charts ===
Chart (2017–2018)	Peak position
Argentina Anglo (Monitor Latino)	14
Australia (ARIA)	4
Australia Dance (ARIA)	1
Austria (Ö3 Austria Top 40)	13
Belgium (Ultratop 50 Flanders)	3
Belgium Dance (Ultratop Flanders)	3
Belgium (Ultratop 50 Wallonia)	28
Belgium Dance (Ultratop Wallonia)	6
Canada Hot 100 (Billboard)	34
Colombia (National-Report)	78
Croatia International Airplay (Top lista)	1
CIS Airplay (TopHit)	22
Czech Republic Airplay (ČNS IFPI)	8
Czech Republic Singles Digital (ČNS IFPI)	6
Denmark (Tracklisten)	10
Euro Digital Songs (Billboard)	2
Finland (Suomen virallinen lista)	2
France (SNEP)	11
France Airplay (SNEP)	7
Germany (GfK)	9
Germany Dance (Official German Charts)	3
Greece International (IFPI)	11
Hungary (Dance Top 40)	8
Hungary (Rádiós Top 40)	3
Hungary (Single Top 40)	6
Hungary (Stream Top 40)	6
Ireland (IRMA)	2
Israel International Airplay (Media Forest)	2
Italy (FIMI)	8
Japan Hot 100 (Billboard)	51
Latvia Streaming (DigiTop100)	86
Luxembourg Digital (Billboard)	9
Malaysia (RIM)	6
Mexico (Monitor Latino)	5
Mexico Airplay (Billboard)	10
Mexico Ingles Airplay (Billboard)	1
Netherlands (Dutch Top 40)	3
Netherlands (Single Top 100)	4
New Zealand (Recorded Music NZ)	12
Norway (VG-lista)	1
Philippines (Philippine Hot 100)	10
Poland Airplay (ZPAV)	1
Poland Dance (ZPAV)	4
Portugal (AFP)	11
Russia Airplay (Tophit)	39
Scottish Singles Sales (Official Charts)	1
Serbia Airplay (Radiomonitor)	6
Slovakia Airplay (ČNS IFPI)	9
Slovakia Singles Digital (ČNS IFPI)	7
Slovenia (SloTop50)	6
South Korea International (Gaon)	80
Spain (Promusicae)	21
Sweden (Sverigetopplistan)	1
Switzerland (Schweizer Hitparade)	6
UK Singles (Official Charts)	1
US Bubbling Under Hot 100 (Billboard)	1
US Dance Airplay (Billboard)	10
US Dance Club Songs (Billboard)	1
US Hot Dance/Electronic Songs (Billboard)	10
US Pop Airplay (Billboard)	35

=== Year-end charts ===
Chart (2017)	Position
Australia (ARIA)	18
Austria (Ö3 Austria Top 40)	51
Belgium (Ultratop Flanders)	8
Belgium (Ultratop Wallonia)	76
Canada (Canadian Hot 100)	82
CIS (Tophit)	177
Denmark (Tracklisten)	31
France (SNEP)	47
Germany (Official German Charts)	34
Hungary (Dance Top 40)	31
Hungary (Rádiós Top 40)	33
Hungary (Single Top 40)	27
Hungary (Stream Top 40)	12
Iceland (Tónlistinn)	4
Israel International Airplay (Media Forest)	18
Italy (FIMI)	15
Latvia Airplay (LaIPA)	12
Netherlands (Dutch Top 40)	10
Netherlands (Single Top 100)	13
New Zealand (Recorded Music NZ)	42
Poland Airplay (ZPAV)	41
Portugal (AFP)	35
Russia Airplay (Tophit)	197
Slovenia Airplay (SloTop50)	28
Spain (Promusicae)	63
Sweden (Sverigetopplistan)	5
Switzerland (Schweizer Hitparade)	17
UK Singles (Official Charts Company)	7
Ukraine Airplay (Tophit)	170
US Dance Club Songs (Billboard)	6
US Hot Dance/Electronic Songs (Billboard)	19

Chart (2018)	Position
Portugal (AFP)	196
UK Singles (Official Charts Company)	93

=== Decade-end charts ===
Chart (2010–2019)	Position
UK Singles (Official Charts Company)	56

== Certifications ==
Region	Certification	Certified units/sales
Australia (ARIA)	5× Platinum	350,000^{‡}
Austria (IFPI Austria)	Platinum	30,000^{‡}
Belgium (BRMA)	Platinum	20,000^{‡}
Canada (Music Canada)	4× Platinum	320,000^{‡}
Denmark (IFPI Danmark)	3× Platinum	270,000^{‡}
France (SNEP)	Diamond	233,333^{‡}
Germany (BVMI)	3× Gold	600,000^{‡}
Italy (FIMI)	4× Platinum	200,000^{‡}
New Zealand (RMNZ)	5× Platinum	150,000^{‡}
Norway (IFPI Norway)	4× Platinum	240,000^{‡}
Poland (ZPAV)	Diamond	250,000^{‡}
Portugal (AFP)	2× Platinum	20,000^{‡}
Spain (Promusicae)	2× Platinum	120,000^{‡}
Switzerland (IFPI Switzerland)	2× Platinum	40,000^{‡}
United Kingdom (BPI)	5× Platinum	3,000,000^{‡}
United States (RIAA)	Platinum	1,000,000^{‡}
Streaming
Japan (RIAJ)	Platinum	100,000,000^{†}
^{‡} Sales+streaming figures based on certification alone.^{†} Streaming-only figures based on certification alone.

== Release history ==
Region	Date	Format	Version	Label	Ref.
Various	16 March 2017	Digital download	Alternative	Atlantic; Epic	
Various	17 March 2017	Digital download	Original	Atlantic; Epic	
Italy	24 March 2017	Contemporary hit radio	Original	Warner	
United States	7 April 2017	Digital download	Acoustic	Atlantic; Epic	
United States	7 April 2017	Digital download	MK remix	Atlantic; Epic	
United Kingdom	5 May 2017	Contemporary hit radio	Original	Atlantic; Epic	
United States	12 May 2017	Digital download	R3hab remix	Atlantic; Epic	
United States	16 May 2017	Top 40 radio	Original	Atlantic; Epic	
United States	25 May 2017	Digital download	Cash Cash remix	Atlantic; Epic	
United States	6 June 2017	Mainstream radio	Original	Atlantic; Epic	
United States	16 June 2017	Digital download	Sem Thomasson remix	Atlantic; Epic	
United States	16 June 2017	Digital download	Lodato & Joseph Duveen remix	Atlantic; Epic	
United States	16 June 2017	Digital download	James Hype remix	Atlantic; Epic	
United States	16 June 2017	Digital download	Dash Berlin remix	Atlantic; Epic	
United States	16 June 2017	Digital download	Coldabank remix	Atlantic; Epic	

== See also ==
- List of number-one dance singles of 2017 (Australia)
- List of number-one dance singles of 2017 (U.S.)
