= Don't Let Me Be Yours =

2017 single by Zara Larsson

- Remixes cover

Single by Zara Larsson

from the album So Good
- Released: 12 May 2017
- Length: 3:19
- Label: TEN; Epic
- Songwriters: Zara Larsson; Steve McCutcheon; Johnny McDaid; Edward Christopher Sheeran
- Producer: Steve Mac

Zara Larsson singles chronology
"Symphony" (2017)	"Don't Let Me Be Yours" (2017)	"Only You" (2017)

Music video
- "Don't Let Me Be Yours" on YouTube

"Don't Let Me Be Yours" is a song by Swedish singer Zara Larsson. It was released on 12 May 2017 by TEN Music Group and Epic Records as the sixth single from her second studio album, So Good (2017). Larsson co-wrote the song with Steve Mac, Johnny McDaid, and Ed Sheeran who additionally provided backing vocals, while Mac handled its production.

== Composition ==
"Don't Let Me Be Yours" is an upbeat song with romantic lyrics and an energetic production. The song is three minutes and nineteen seconds long, and is in the key of E major and moves at a tempo of 113 beats per minute in a 4/4 time signature. English singer Ed Sheeran co-wrote the song and provided backing vocals for it.

== Release and promotion ==
TEN Music Group and Epic Records released "Don't Let Me Be Yours" on 12 May 2017, days after Larsson performed a mashup of the song and Sheeran's 2017 single "Shape of You" at the MTV Movie & TV Awards. The accompanying music video directed by Daniel Kaufman premiered on the same day of the song's release, via Larsson's Vevo channel. The video has a girl power theme, following the story of a young girl who aspires to be a racer. "Don't Let Me Be Yours" was serviced to the UK contemporary hit radio on 2 June.

== Track listing ==
Digital download – remixes

1. Don't Let Me Be Yours (Black Chiney remix) — 3:25
2. Don't Let Me Be Yours (AObeats remix) — 4:11

== Personnel ==
- Zara Larsson – vocals, writer, background vocals
- Johnny McDaid – writer
- Ed Sheeran – writer, background vocals, guitar
- Steve Mac – writer, producer, keyboard, piano
- Chris Laws – drums
- Phil Tan – mixing engineer
- Bill Zimmerman – mixing engineer
- Chris Laws – mixing engineer
- Dann Pursey – mixing engineer
- Emerson Mancini – mastering engineer

== Charts ==
Chart performance
Chart (2017)	Peak position
Netherlands (Dutch Top 40 Tipparade)	16
Slovakia Airplay (ČNS IFPI)	57
Sweden (Sverigetopplistan)	36

== Release history ==
Release dates and formats
Region	Date	Format	Version	Label	Ref.
Various	12 May 2017	Digital download	Remixes	TEN; Sony	
United Kingdom	2 June 2017	Contemporary hit radio	Original	TEN; Sony	
