= Sasha (Jamaican musician) =

Jamaican dancehall musician

- Also known as: Sista Sasha
- Born: Christine Chin; 1974 (age 51–52); Kingston, Jamaica
- Origin: New York City, U.S.
- Genres: Dancehall; reggae; gospel
- Occupations: Deejay; singer
- Years active: 1992–present
- Labels: Mango, Atlantic, VP

Christine Chin (born 1974), better known by her stage names Sasha and Sista Sasha, is a Jamaican dancehall musician, presently recording gospel music.

Born in Kingston, Jamaica, she was raised in Queens, New York City. Her first big hit was Dat Sexy Body. In 1998, she wrote "Dat Sexy Body", composed on a variation of the "Bookshelf" riddim, which was later remixed with famous reggaeton artist Ivy Queen. Her biggest hit is "I'm Still in Love with You" with fellow dancehall musician Sean Paul.

In the 2000s, she started a hair salon business. She became a Christian in 2008 and changed her stage name, and stated that she would no longer perform the songs that made her famous.

== Career ==
=== Early career and Come Again ===
She wrote her first rap at age 11, and as a student at August Martin High School, the young teen first performed professionally at Brooklyn's Biltmore Ballroom, modelling herself after such childhood idols as rap's greatest female act, Salt-N-Pepa, as well as Jamaican female rapper Shelly Thunder. Sasha's professional career began after she performed an impromptu freestyle during a Shabba Ranks concert. Following the performance, Ranks' management invited her to record demo material. Not two weeks went by before Steely & Clevie, computer dancehall's whiz team, heard her demos and sought her out in New York. They flew her to Jamaica to write and cut her first record, the hardcore rap "Kill the Bitch." The album was released by Island on the Bogle compilation alongside tracks by established stars Buju Banton and Papa San. Sasha's track was picked as a standout by stateside DJs, and it has played for literally years in the hip-hop underground. At 16, Sasha was touring worldwide with all of dancehall's biggest names, and learning her craft through a variety of experiences. Sasha released her debut album titled "Come Again" in 1997 on Anchor Records.

=== "Dat Sexy Body", "I'm Still in Love with You", and Sexy Body Sasha ===
In 1998, Sasha began singing after producer Tony Kelly encouraged her to contribute to the "Bookshelf" riddim. Her song "Dat Sexy Body" became a club and radio staple. She later recorded "I’m Still in Love," a duet with Sean Paul, which appeared on his album Dutty Rock. The song reached number one on reggae charts in Jamaica, London, Miami, and New York. Sasha has cited her upbringing in New York and Jamaican heritage as factors in her ability to reach both Jamaican and American audiences.

Sasha has also had a string of hits in Jamaica, including "Runaway With Me", "Hot Girls", "Natural High", "Wine Gal Wine", and We Got The Love (Feat. Turbulence). Sasha was also working on an album for VP Records titled "Sexy Body Sasha" which was supposed to be released in 2006 but Sasha left the label and the album got shelved. The songs from the album will soon be released as a mixtape under the same title.

=== Transition to gospel music, "Breaking Free", and TryGod Records ===
In early 2008, Sasha converted to Christianity and transitioned to recording gospel music. She subsequently stated she would no longer perform her previous secular hits. She was known for songs like Natty On Mi Frontline and We Got The Love, which were done with her former lover, Turbulence, as well as a remake of Alton Ellis' I'm Still in Love, which she did with Sean Paul. As a Christian, Sasha sang on the Beauty of Holiness Gospel Band, which she formed about five years ago. Since then, the band has performed mainly on the north coast. They also have a song called Surround Me. However, the band's first major appearance will be at Gospel Explosion. Sasha released her first album in 17 years titled "Breaking Free" on 8 April 2014.

In June 2014, Sasha signed with TryGod Records.

== Discography ==
=== Albums ===
- 1997: Come Again
- 2006: Sexy Body Sasha (Shelved)
- 2009: Pleasure (Shelved)
- 2014: Breaking Free
- 2021: Pree Life TBR

=== Singles ===
- 1993: Kill the Bitch
- 1995: In & Out
- 1996: Come Again
- 1997: Black or White
- 1997: Girls
- 1998: Dat Sexy Body
- 2001: Poppy
- 2002: Can You Please Me
- 2004: Run Dung Me
- 2004: I'm Still in Love with You (with Sean Paul)
- 2004: Dat Sexy Body (re-release)
- 2005: Coca-Cola Shape/Dat Sexy Body (Remix) (feat. Ivy Queen)
- 2006: Natural High
- 2006: Wine Gal Wine
- 2006: I Like the Way (feat. Pitbull)
- 2008: Black or White (feat. Eddie Dee)
- 2009: Pleasure
- 2012: Chosen
- 2013: Get Through It
- 2013: I Am Anointed
- 2014: Nutten No Sweet Like
