= List of songs written by Julia Michaels =

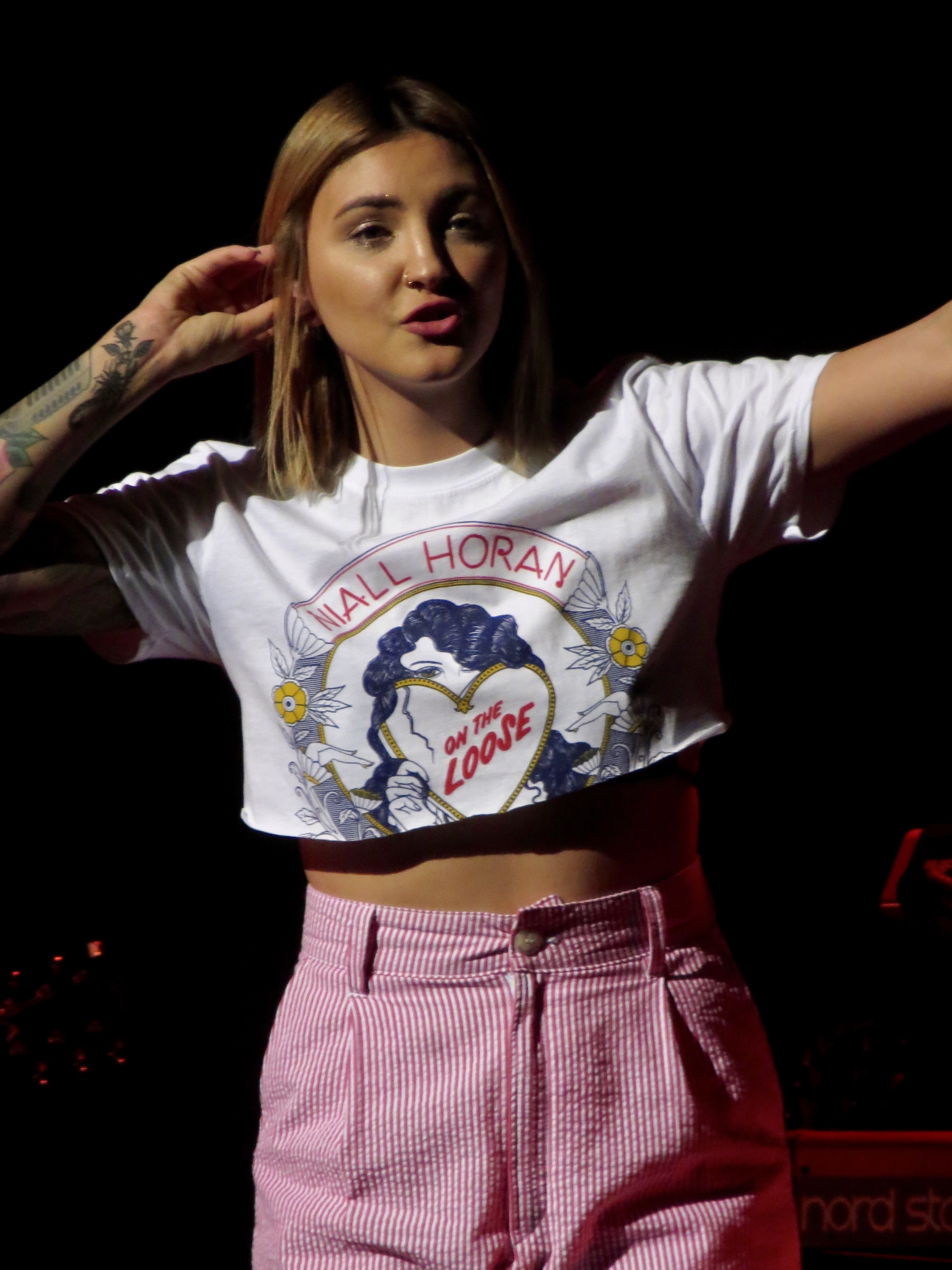
Michaels performing in 2018.

Julia Michaels is an American singer-songwriter. After releasing two extended plays worth of music independently, Julia turned to writing for other artists and gained much success when she developed a close writing partnership with Justin Tranter. During that time, they have scored numerous Billboard chart-toppers and was labelled as one of Rolling Stone's "20 Biggest Breakouts of 2015" for their writing efforts of that year. When her song writing career was at its peak, she eventually began releasing music under her own name and returned with her 2017 single "Issues", which peaked at number 11 on the Billboard Hot 100 in the United States and was certified quintuple-platinum by the Recording Industry Association of America (RIAA).

This list of songs is split into the full list of contributions and those that have performed in the charts across various countries. Additionally, the international singles and certifications are placed by order of the song's initial release, which may coincide with an album release.

== Songs written ==
Key
‡	Indicates song written solely by Julia Michaels
†	Indicates song features an uncredited vocal contribution by Julia Michaels
•	Indicates song features a credited vocal or featured artist contribution by Julia Michaels

Song	Artist(s)	Writer(s)	Album	Year	Ref.
"17"	Julia Michaels	Julia Michaels; Louis Bell	Inner Monologue Part 2	2019	
"2002"	Anne-Marie	Anne-Marie; Steve Mac; Ed Sheeran; Julia Michaels; Benny Blanco	Speak Your Mind	2018	
"24/7"	AWA	AWA; Julia Michaels; Axident; Ilsey Juber	Non-album single	2021	
"All in My Head (Flex)"	Fifth Harmony featuring Fetty Wap	Fifth Harmony; Stargate; Benny Blanco; Brian Garcia; Tory Lanez; Sir Nolan; Julia Michaels; Fetty Wap; Daniel Gonzalez; Mad Cobra (Note: "All in My Head (Flex)" contains a portion of the composition "Flex", written by Mad Cobra, Clifton Dillon, Richard Foulks, Herbert Harris, LeRoy Romans, Sly Dunbar, Brian Thompson and Handel Tucker.); Clifton Dillon; Richard Foulks; Herbert Harris; LeRoy Romans; Sly Dunbar; Brian Thompson; Handel Tucker	7/27	2016	
"All Your Exes"	Julia Michaels	Julia Michaels; JP Saxe; Stefan Johnson; Jordan K. Johnson; Oliver Peterhof	Not in Chronological Order	2021	
"Angel Boy"	Khalid	Khalid; Ilya Salmanzadeh; Julia Michaels; Luka Kloser	After the Sun Goes Down	2025	
"Anxiety"	Julia Michaels featuring Selena Gomez	Julia Michaels; Selena Gomez; Scott Harris; Ian Kirkpatrick	Inner Monologue Part 1	2019	
"Anything But Love"	Tate McRae	Tate McRae; Ryan Tedder; Grant Boutin	So Close to What???	2025	
"Apple"‡	Julia Michaels	Julia Michaels	Inner Monologue Part 1	2019	
"Area Code"	Nick Jonas	Nick Jonas; Ian Kirkpatrick; Julia Michaels; Sir Nolan; Sean Douglas; Simon Wilcox	Nick Jonas X2	2015	
"Asking 4 It"	Gwen Stefani featuring Fetty Wap	Gwen Stefani; Justin Tranter; Julia Michaels; Stargate; Fetty Wap	This Is What the Truth Feels Like	2016	
"Back to Beautiful"	Sofia Carson featuring Alan Walker	Julia Michaels; Justin Tranter; Stargate; Alan Walker; Mood Melodies; Gunnar Greve; Jesper Borgen	Non-album single	2017	
"Bad for You"	Billy Raffoul	Billy Raffoul; Julia Michaels	The Running Wild	2019	
"Bad Liar"	Selena Gomez	Selena Gomez; Julia Michaels; Justin Tranter; Ian Kirkpatrick; David Byrne (Note: "Bad Liar" contains a sample of "Psycho Killer", written by David Byrne, Chris Frantz, and Tina Weymouth.); Chris Frantz; Tina Weymouth	Non-album single	2017	
"Bailey"‡	Julia Michaels	Julia Michaels	Julia Michaels	2010	
"Barbies"	Pink	Pink; Julia Michaels; Ross Golan; Jakob Jerlström; Ludvig Söderberg	Beautiful Trauma	2017	
"Bed Chem"	Sabrina Carpenter	Sabrina Carpenter; Amy Allen; John Ryan; Ian Kirkpatrick	Short n' Sweet	2024	
"Better"	Britney Spears	Britney Spears; Julia Michaels; Justin Tranter; BloodPop	Glory	2016	
"Body"	Glowie	Julia Michaels; Justin Tranter; Mattman & Robin	Where I Belong	2019	
"Body"	Julia Michaels	Julia Michaels; Justin Tranter; Louis Bell	Inner Monologue Part 2	2019	
"Body Heat"	Selena Gomez	Rock Mafia; Hit-Boy; Justin Tranter; Julia Michaels; Selena Gomez	Revival	2015	
"Boyfriend"	Selena Gomez	Selena Gomez; Julia Michaels; Justin Tranter; Jon Wienner; Sam Homaee	Rare	2020	
"Break Out"	Scott Stapp	Scott Stapp; Jagger Stapp; Mitch Allan; Julia Michaels	Proof of Life	2013	
"Call Me When You Break Up"	Selena Gomez With Benny Blanco, (featuring Gracie Abrams in some editions)	Selena Gomez; Benny Blanco; Gracie Abrams; Cashmere Cat; Dylan Brady; Mattman & Robin	I Said I Love You First	2025	
"Can't Do It Without You"	Ross Lynch	Julia Michaels; Joleen L. Belle; Mike McGarity	Austin & Ally	2012	
"Candy Boy"	Twice	Kim Eun-soo; Julia Michaels; Chloe Leighton; Ryan & Smitty	The Story Begins	2015	
"Carry Me" •	Kygo featuring Julia Michaels	Kygo; Julia Michaels; Justin Tranter	Cloud Nine	2016	
"Chainsaw"	Nick Jonas	Nick Jonas; Sir Nolan; Simon Wilcox; Julia Michaels; Sean Douglas	Last Year Was Complicated	2016	
"Change Your Mind (No Seas Cortes)"	Britney Spears	Julia Michaels; Justin Tranter; Mattman & Robin	Glory	2016	
"Chasing You"	Ben Platt	Ben Platt; Julia Michaels; Michael Pollack	Reverie	2021	
"Cheat Code"	H.E.R.	H.E.R. Julia Michaels; DJ Camper; Asa Taccone	Back of My Mind	2021	
"Childhood Bedroom"	Ben Platt	Ben Platt; Julia Michaels; Michael Pollack	Reverie	2021	
"Cigarette"	Henry Moodie	Henry Moodie; Connor McDonough; Riley McDonough; Julia Michaels	Mood Swings	2025	
"Circles Around This Town"	Maren Morris	Maren Morris; Jimmy Robbins; Julia Michaels; Ryan Hurd	Humble Quest	2022	
"Close"	Nick Jonas featuring Tove Lo	Julia Michaels; Justin Tranter; Tove Lo; Mattman & Robin	Last Year Was Complicated	2016	
"Closet"‡	Julia Michaels	Julia Michaels	Julia Michaels	2010	
"Coincidence"	Sabrina Carpenter	Sabrina Carpenter; Amy Allen; John Ryan; Ian Kirkpatrick	Short n' Sweet	2024	
"Commander in Chief"	Demi Lovato	Demi Lovato; Eren Cannata; Justin Tranter; Julia Michaels; Finneas	Non-album single	2020	
"Coming Home" •	Keith Urban featuring Julia Michaels	Keith Urban; J. R. Rotem; Julia Michaels; Nicolle Galyon; Merle Haggard (Note: "Coming Home" contains a sample of "Mama Tried", written by Merle Haggard.)	Graffiti U	2018	
"Compass"	Zella Day	Zella Day; Xandy Barry; Julia Michaels	Zella Day	2014	
"Cool Anymore" •	Jordan Davis featuring Julia Michaels	Jordan Davis; Ross Copperman; Nicolle Galyon; Julia Michaels; Emily Weisband	Jordan Davis	2020	
"Corners"	The Fray	Joe King; Isaac Slade; Denny White; Julia Michaels	Through the Years: The Best of the Fray	2016	
"Cotton Candy"	Yungblud	Yungblud; Julia Michaels; Justin Tranter; Christopher Greatti; Omer Fedi	Weird!	2020	
"Crashing"	Illenium featuring Bahari	Illenium; Julia Michaels; Justin Tranter; Rock Mafia; Elio Armato	Ascend	2019	
"Daisy"†	Zedd	Zedd; Axident; Jason Evigan; Julia Michaels; Danny Parker	True Colors	2015	
"Dance with Me 2nite"	Nia Archives	Dehaney Hunt; Ethan P. Flynn; Julia Michaels	Emotional Junglist	2026	
"Dear God"	Tate McRae	Tate McRae; Ryan Tedder; Grant Boutin	So Close to What	2025	
"Don't Tell It" (Unreleased)	Britney Spears	Julia Michaels; Justin Tranter; J Roc	Glory	2016	
"Dámelo To"	Selena Gomez featuring Myke Towers	Selena Gomez; Alejandro Borrero; Carballo Ramos; Cordero Boria; Elena Rose; Tainy; Melendez; Julia Michaels; Ivanni Rodríguez; Myke Towers	Revelación	2021	
"Deep"‡	Julia Michaels	Julia Michaels	Inner Monologue Part 1	2019	
"Deserve"	Christina Aguilera	Julia Michaels; MNEK	Liberation	2018	
"Desperate"	Jonas Blue featuring Nina Nesbitt	Jonas Blue; Julia Michaels; Jackson Foote; Patrick Nissley; Dave Katz	Blue	2018	
"Dive"	Ed Sheeran	Ed Sheeran; Benny Blanco; Julia Michaels	÷	2017	
"Do You Wanna Come Over?"	Britney Spears	Julia Michaels; Justin Tranter; Mattman & Robin; Sandy Chila	Glory	2016	
"Don't Talk About Love"	G.R.L.	Jason Evigan; Mitch Allan; Lindy Robbins; Julia Michaels	G.R.L.	2014	
"Don't Wanna Think"‡	Julia Michaels	Julia Michaels	Nervous System	2017	
"Dope"	Fifth Harmony	Jack Antonoff; Julia Michaels; Justin Tranter	7/27	2016	
"Down"‡	Julia Michaels	Julia Michaels	Julia Michaels	2010	
"Dress"	Niall Horan	Niall Horan; Julia Michaels; Greg Kurstin	Heartbreak Weather	2020	
"Drew Barrymore"	Bryce Vine	Bryce Vine; JP Clark; Julia Michaels; Sir Nolan	Carnival	2019	
"Dumb & Poetic"	Sabrina Carpenter	Sabrina Carpenter; Amy Allen; John Ryan; Ian Kirkpatrick	Short n' Sweet	2024	
"Either Way"	Snakehips with Anne-Marie featuring Joey Badass	Snakehips; Julia Michaels; Oak Felder; Joey Badass	Non-album single	2017	
"Electric Touch"	A R I Z O N A	A R I Z O N A Julia Michaels	GALLERY	2017	
"Falling for Boys"‡	Julia Michaels	Julia Michaels	Inner Monologue Part 2	2019	
"Favorite Place"	John Legend	John Legend; Julia Michaels; Digi	Bigger Love	2020	
"Fever"	Dua Lipa with Angèle	Dua Lipa; Julia Michaels; Caroline Ailin; Ian Kirkpatrick; Jacob Kasher Hindlin; Angèle	Future Nostalgia	2020	
"FFF"	Zara Larsson	Zara Larsson; Julia Michaels; Justin Tranter; Ian Kirkpatrick	Poster Girl	2021	
"Figure 8"	Maliibu N Helene	Jason Evigan; Julia Michaels; Mustard; Jennifer Roberts	Non-album single	2015	
"Fingers Crossed" •	Trevor Daniel with Julia Michaels	Trevor Daniel; Julia Michaels; Jason Evigan	That Was Then	2021	
"Fire Starter"	Demi Lovato	Julia Michaels; Jarrad Rogers; Lindy Robbins	Demi	2013	
"For Now"	Pink	Pink; Julia Michaels; Mattman & Robin; Max Martin	Beautiful Trauma	2017	
"Force of Nature"	Bea Miller	Ashley Gorley; The Runners; Julia Michaels; Alex Delicata	Not an Apology	2015	
"Friends"	Justin Bieber and BloodPop	Justin Bieber; BloodPop; Justin Tranter; Julia Michaels	Non-album single	2017	
"Fucked Up, Kinda"	Julia Michaels featuring Role Model	Julia Michaels; Scott Harris	Inner Monologue Part 2	2019	
"Fun"	Selena Gomez	Selena Gomez; Julia Michaels; Scott Harris; Raul Cubina; Mark Williams	Rare	2020	
"Futuristic"‡	Julia Michaels	Julia Michaels	Futuristic	2012	
"Gemini"	Keith Urban	Keith Urban; Julia Michaels; Justin Tranter; Ian Kirkpatrick	Graffiti U	2018	
"Getting Loud"‡	Julia Michaels	Julia Michaels	Futuristic	2012	
"Getting Warmer"	Gwen Stefani	Gwen Stefani; Justin Tranter; Julia Michaels; J. R. Rotem; Mike Green	This Is What the Truth Feels Like	2016	
"Give in to You"	Dan + Shay	Dan Smyers; Julia Michaels; Jordan Reynolds	Good Things	2021	
"Give It to You"	Julia Michaels	Julia Michaels; Ryan Tedder; Shane McAnally; Ester Dean; Keegan Bost; Andrew DeRoberts	Non-album single	2020	
"Going Going Gone"	Maddie Poppe	Julia Michaels; Lindy Robbins; Mitch Allan	Non-album single	2018	
"Good for You"	Selena Gomez featuring A$AP Rocky	Justin Tranter; Julia Michaels; Nick Monson; Sir Nolan; A$AP Rocky; Hector Delgado; Selena Gomez	Revival	2015	
"Good Graces"	Sabrina Carpenter	Sabrina Carpenter; Amy Allen; John Ryan; Ian Kirkpatrick; Julian Bunetta	Short n' Sweet	2024	
"Good Place"	Demi Lovato	Demi Lovato; Eren Cannata; Julia Michaels; Justin Tranter	Dancing with the Devil... the Art of Starting Over	2021	
"Hallelujah"	Years & Years	Olly Alexander; Julia Michaels; Justin Tranter; Greg Kurstin	Palo Santo	2018	
"Hands" •	Various artists (Note: "Hands" contains vocals and contributions from Michaels, Justin Tranter, Imagine Dragons, BloodPop, Britney Spears, Selena Gomez, Mark Ronson, Jennifer Lopez, Gwen Stefani, Kacey Musgraves, Jason Derulo, Meghan Trainor, Juanes, Pink, Mary J. Blige, Halsey, Troye Sivan, Ty Herndon, Adam Lambert, Trans Chorus of Los Angeles, MNEK, Alex Newell, Mary Lambert, Prince Royce, Jussie Smollett, Nate Ruess, and RuPaul.)	Justin Tranter; Julia Michaels; BloodPop	Non-album single	2016	
"Hands to Myself"	Selena Gomez	Justin Tranter; Julia Michaels; Mattman & Robin; Max Martin; Selena Gomez	Revival	2015	
"Hands Up"‡	Julia Michaels	Julia Michaels	Futuristic	2012	
"Handwritten"	Tini	Shelly Peiken; Julia Michaels; David Gamson	Tini	2016	
"Happy"	Julia Michaels	Julia Michaels; Justin Tranter; Casey Barth; Riley Knapp	Inner Monologue Part 1	2019	
"Hate That You Know Me"	Bleachers	Jack Antonoff; Julia Michaels	Gone Now	2017	
"Hate You"	Kate Nash	Kate Nash; Julia Michaels; Sir Nolan	Yesterday Was Forever	2018	
"Hawt Damn"‡	Julia Michaels	Julia Michaels	Futuristic	2012	
"Heal Me"	Lady Gaga	Lady Gaga; Mark Nilan Jr. Nick Monson; DJ White Shadow; Julia Michaels; Justin Tranter	A Star Is Born	2018	
"Hearts"	Jessie Ware	Jessie Ware; Julia Michaels; Benny Blanco; Two Inch Punch	Glasshouse	2017	
"Heaven"	Julia Michaels	Julia Michaels; Brian Garcia; MNEK; Morten Ristorp; Tayla Parx	Fifty Shades Freed	2018	
"Heavy"	Linkin Park featuring Kiiara	Chester Bennington; Mike Shinoda; Brad Delson; Julia Michaels; Justin Tranter	One More Light	2017	
"Hell Nos and Headphones"	Hailee Steinfeld	Julia Michaels; Justin Tranter; Mattman & Robin	Haiz	2015	
"Help Me Out" •	Maroon 5 with Julia Michaels	Adam Levine; Julia Michaels; Diplo; King Henry; Justin Tranter	Red Pill Blues	2017	
"Hey Stupid, I Love You"	JP Saxe	JP Saxe; Julia Michaels; Scott Harris; Raul Cubina; Mark Williams	Non-album single	2020	
"History"	Julia Michaels	Julia Michaels; John Ryan	Not in Chronological Order	2021	
"Hold On To Me"	JP Saxe	JP Saxe; Julia Michaels; John Ryan; Teddy Geiger	Dangerous Levels of Introspection	2021	
"Home Alone"	Ansel Elgort	Ansel Elgort; Julia Michaels; Kyle Trewartha; Tom Norris	Non-album single	2016	
"How Did We"	Skylar Stecker	Julia Michaels; Justin Tranter; Jussifer	Everything, Everything	2017	
"Hurt Again"	Julia Michaels	Julia Michaels; Caroline Ailin; Ian Kirkpatrick	Inner Monologue Part 2	2019	
"Hurts So Good"	Astrid S	Lindy Robbins; Julia Michaels; Tom Meredith; Marco Borreno	Astrid S	2016	
"I Can't Breathe"	Bea Miller	Julia Michaels; Bea Miller; James Wong	Aurora	2018	
"I Dare You"	Bea Miller	Julia Michaels; Mitch Allan	Not an Apology	2015	
"I Got You"	Cimorelli	David Gamson; Joleen L. Belle; Julia Michaels	Renegade	2014	
"I Know Love"	Tate McRae featuring The Kid Laroi	Tate McRae; Ryan Tedder; Tyler Spry Michaels; Charlton Howard; Billy Walsh	So Close to What	2025	
"I Miss You" •	Clean Bandit featuring Julia Michaels	Jack Patterson; Grace Chatto; Julia Michaels	What Is Love?	2018	
"If the World Was Ending" •	JP Saxe featuring Julia Michaels	JP Saxe; Julia Michaels	Dangerous Levels of Introspection	2019	
"If Walls Could Talk"	5 Seconds of Summer	Calum Hood; Ashton Irwin; Justin Tranter; Julia Michaels; Sir Nolan	Youngblood	2018	
"If You Need Me"	Julia Michaels	Julia Michaels; JP Saxe; Ben Rice	—N/a	2019	
"In the Dark"	Olivia Holt	Jintae Ko; Tanner Underwood; Julia Michaels; Lindy Robbins	Olivia	2016	
"Ins and Outs"	Sofia Carson	Jason Evigan; Julia Michaels; Justin Tranter	Non-album single	2017	
"Into You"	Julia Michaels	Julia Michaels; Frank Dukes; Louis Bell	Inner Monologue Part 1	2019	
"Invincible"†	Borgeous	Borgeous; Julia Michaels; Lindy Robbins; Kshmr	Non-album single	2014	
"Invitation"	Britney Spears	Britney Spears; Julia Michaels; Justin Tranter; Nick Monson	Glory	2016	
"Issues"	Julia Michaels	Julia Michaels; Benny Blanco; Stargate; Justin Tranter	Nervous System	2017	
"It's Me, It's You"	Ross Lynch	Julia Michaels; Joleen L. Belle; Mike McGarity	Austin & Ally	2012	
"Julianna Calm Down"	The Chicks	Natalie Maines; Jack Antonoff; Julia Michaels	Gaslighter	2020	
"Jump"	Julia Michaels featuring Trippie Redd	Julia Michaels; Justin Tranter; Nick Monson; Trippie Redd	Non-album single	2018	
"Just Do It"	Julia Michaels	Julia Michaels; Mattman & Robin; Justin Tranter	Nervous System	2017	
"Just like Me"	Britney Spears	Britney Spears; Julia Michaels; Justin Tranter; Nick Monson	Glory	2016	
"Just Luv Me"	Britney Spears	Robopop; Cashmere Cat; Julia Michaels	Glory	2016	
"Keep Talking" •	Rita Ora featuring Julia Michaels	Julia Michaels; Justin Tranter; Stargate	Phoenix	2018	
"Kingdom Come"	Demi Lovato featuring Iggy Azalea	Demi Lovato; Julia Michaels; Steve Mac; Iggy Azalea	Confident	2015	
"Kingmaker" •	Maisie Peters with Julia Michaels	Maisie Peters; Julia Michaels; Chloe Kraemer	Florescence	2026	
"Kissin' in the Cold" •	JP Saxe with Julia Michaels	JP Saxe; Julia Michaels	Non-album single	2020	
"Leave My Mind"	Ben Platt	Ben Platt; Gian Stone; Ian Kirkpatrick; Julia Michaels; Michael Pollack	Reverie	2021	
"Lie Like This"	Julia Michaels	Julia Michaels; Stefan Johnson; Jordan K. Johnson; Michael Pollack	Not in Chronological Order	2021	
"Lie to Me" •	5 Seconds of Summer featuring Julia Michaels	Calum Hood; Luke Hemmings; Ashton Irwin; Ali Tamposi; Andrew Watt; Julia Michaels	Youngblood	2018	
"Light Me Up" •	RL Grime featuring Miguel and Julia Michaels	RL Grime; King Henry; Julia Michaels; Diplo; Miguel; Boombox Cartel; Skrillex	Nova	2018	
"Lights Out"	Keshia Chanté	Julia Michaels; Lindy Robbins; Oliver Peterhof; Tinashe Sibanda	Unbound 02	2018	
"Like That"	JP Saxe	JP Saxe; Alex St. Kitts; Julia Michaels; Ryan Marrone	Dangerous Levels of Introspection	2021	
"Like to Be You" •	Shawn Mendes featuring Julia Michaels	Shawn Mendes; Julia Michaels; Scott Harris	Shawn Mendes	2018	
"Like You Mean It"	Robin Schulz featuring Rhys	Robin Schulz; Dennis Bierbrodt; Jurgen Dohr; Guido Kramer; Stefan Dabruck; Julia Michaels; Justin Tranter; Mason Levy	Uncovered	2017	
"Lips on You"	Maroon 5	Adam Levine; Charlie Puth; Jacob Kasher Hindlin; Julia Michaels; Jason Evigan	Red Pill Blues	2017	
"Little Did I Know"	Julia Michaels	Julia Michaels; JP Saxe	Not in Chronological Order	2021	
"Live for You"	1GN	Lauryn Taylor Bach; Mike Green; Jason McArthur; Julia Michaels	1 Girl Nation	2013	
"Logical"	Olivia Rodrigo	Olivia Rodrigo; Dan Nigro; Julia Michaels	Guts	2023	
"Look at Her Now"	Selena Gomez	Selena Gomez; Julia Michaels; Justin Tranter; Ian Kirkpatrick	Rare	2020	
"Lose You to Love Me"	Selena Gomez	Selena Gomez; Julia Michaels; Justin Tranter; Mattman & Robin	Rare	2020	
"Love Back"	Brenna Whitaker	Lindy Robbins; Chris Braide; Julia Michaels	Brenna Whitaker	2015	
"Love Is Weird"	Julia Michaels	Julia Michaels; John Ryan; Stefan Johnson; Jordan K. Johnson; Billy Walsh	Not in Chronological Order	2021	
"Love Me Land"	Zara Larsson	Zara Larsson; Julia Michaels; Justin Tranter; Jason Gill	Poster Girl	2021	
"Love Me or Leave Me"	Little Mix	Matt Rad; Julia Michaels; Shane Stevens	Get Weird	2015	
"Love Myself"	Hailee Steinfeld	Julia Michaels; Justin Tranter; Mattman & Robin; Oscar Holter	Haiz	2015	
"Love You Anyway"	John Legend	John Legend; Julia Michaels; Justin Tranter	Darkness and Light	2016	
"Made in Gold"	Nova Rockafeller	Nova Rockafeller; Lindy Robbins; Dilesh Haria; E. Kidd Bogart; Greg Ogan; Julia Michaels; Sam Watters; Spencer Nezey	Non-album single	2015	
"Make It Up to You"	Julia Michaels	Julia Michaels; Mattman & Robin; Justin Tranter	Nervous System	2017	
"Make Me Feel"	Janelle Monáe	Janelle Monáe; Mattman & Robin; Justin Tranter; Julia Michaels	Dirty Computer	2018	
"Make Me Like You"	Gwen Stefani	Gwen Stefani; Justin Tranter; Julia Michaels; Mattman & Robin	This Is What the Truth Feels Like	2016	
"Me & the Rhythm"	Selena Gomez	Justin Tranter; Julia Michaels; Mattman & Robin; Selena Gomez	Revival	2015	
"Me Without You"	Gwen Stefani	Gwen Stefani; Justin Tranter; Julia Michaels; J. R. Rotem	This Is What the Truth Feels Like	2016	
"Melon Cake"	Demi Lovato	Demi Lovato; Julia Michaels; Justin Tranter; Eren Cannata	Dancing with the Devil... the Art of Starting Over	2021	
"Misery"	Gwen Stefani	Gwen Stefani; Justin Tranter; Julia Michaels; Mattman & Robin	This Is What the Truth Feels Like	2016	
"Miss Movin' On"	Fifth Harmony	Jason Evigan; Lindy Robbins; Julia Michaels; Mitch Allan	Better Together	2013	
"More & More"	Twice	Park Jin-young; Bibi; MNEK; Justin Tranter; Julia Michaels; Zara Larsson	More & More	2020	
"My Attic"	Pink	Julia Michaels; Ilsey Juber; Freddy Wexler	Hurts 2B Human	2019	
"Needy"	Kelsea Ballerini	Kelsea Ballerini; Ross Copperman; Julia Michaels	Kelsea	2020	
"Nervous"	Shawn Mendes	Shawn Mendes; Julia Michaels; Scott Harris	Shawn Mendes	2018	
"Next to You"‡	Julia Michaels	Julia Michaels	Julia Michaels	2010	
"Nighttime Thing" •	Alessia Cara featuring Julia Michaels	Alessia Cara; Julia Michaels; Jacob Kasher Hindlin; Aaron Shadrow; Ammo; Jasper Harris; Yeti Beats	Love & Hyperbole	2025	
"Nobody"	Selena Gomez	Julia Michaels; Nick Monson; Shane Stevens; Selena Gomez	Revival	2015	
"Okay" •	LANY with Julia Michaels	Paul Jason Klein; Julia Michaels	Non-album single	2019	
"On Mine"	Diplo with Noah Cyrus	Diplo; MØ; King Henry; Julia Michaels; Maximilian Jaeger	Diplo Presents Thomas Wesley, Chapter 1: Snake Oil	2020	
"One Mississippi"	Zara Larsson	Julia Michaels; Fred Ball	So Good	2017	
"Only One" •	Khea, Becky G, and Julia Michaels featuring Di Genius	Khea; Becky G Julia Michaels; Di Genius; Elena Rose; Nir Seroussi; Luis Angel O'Neill; Jumbo	Non-album single	2021	
"Orange Magic"	Julia Michaels	Julia Michaels; John Ryan	Not in Chronological Order	2021	
"Pancake"‡	Julia Michaels	Julia Michaels	Futuristic	2012	
"Papercut"	Zedd featuring Troye Sivan	Zedd; Julia Michaels; Sam Martin; Lindy Robbins; Jason Evigan; Austin Paul Flores	True Colors	2015	
"Parallel Line"	Keith Urban	Ed Sheeran; Benny Blanco; Johnny McDaid; Amy Wadge; Julia Michaels; Coldplay (Note: "Parallel Line" contains a sample of "Everglow", written by Coldplay and Stargate.); Stargate	Graffiti U	2018	
"Party's Over"	Astrid S	Ashley Gorley; Julia Michaels; Louis Schoorl; Marco Borrero	Non-album single	2017	
"Peer Pressure" •	James Bay featuring Julia Michaels	James Bay; Julia Michaels	Oh My Messy Mind	2019	
"People Watching"	Conan Gray	Conan Gray; Dan Nigro; Julia Michaels	Superache	2021	
"Perfect"	Selena Gomez	Justin Tranter; Julia Michaels; Felix Snow; Selena Gomez	Revival	2015	
"Pessimist"	Julia Michaels	Julia Michaels; John Ryan; Stefan Johnson; Jordan K. Johnson; G Koop	Not in Chronological Order	2021	
"Pimienta"	Elena Rose	Elena Rose; Julia Michaels; BloodPop; Ernesto Suárez; Klahr; Ricardo Esteban Garzon Mesa; Liohn	Non-album single	2021	
"Pink"	Julia Michaels	Julia Michaels; Mattman & Robin; Justin Tranter	Nervous System	2017	
"Poison"	Rita Ora	Kate Nash; Sir Nolan; Julia Michaels	Non-album single	2015	
"Poster Girl"	Zara Larsson	Zara Larsson; Julia Michaels; Justin Tranter; David Pramik; Jon Wienner; Sam Homaee	Poster Girl	2021	
"Power"	Kat Graham	Jason Evigan; Julia Michaels; Sean Douglas; Mitch Allan	Non-album single	2013	
"Preacher"	Years & Years	Olly Alexander; Julia Michaels; Justin Tranter; Jesse Shatkin	Palo Santo	2018	
"Prettier"	Grace VanderWaal	Grace VanderWaal; Julia Michaels; Grant Boutin; Mark Schick	TBA	2026	
"Pretty Catatonic"	Demi Lovato	Demi Lovato; Julia Michaels; Kevin Hickey; Steph Jones	It's Not That Deep (Unless You Want It to Be)	2026	
"Pretty Please"	Dua Lipa	Dua Lipa; Julia Michaels; Caroline Ailin; Ian Kirkpatrick	Future Nostalgia	2020	
"Priest"	Julia Michaels	Julia Michaels; Justin Tranter	Inner Monologue Part 2	2019	
"Raft in the Sea" •	Danny L Harle with Julia Michaels	Danny L Harle; Julia Michaels	Cerulean	2026	
"Rare"	Gwen Stefani	Gwen Stefani; Justin Tranter; Julia Michaels; Greg Kurstin	This Is What the Truth Feels Like	2016	
"Real Life Stuff" •	Diplo featuring Julia Michaels and Clever	Diplo; Julia Michaels; Clever; Amy Allen; Philip von Boch Scully; Maximilian Jaeger	Diplo Presents Thomas Wesley, Chapter 1: Snake Oil	2020	
"Redial"	Laura Marano	Aris Archontis; Jeannie Lurie; Julia Michaels; Chen Neeman	Austin & Ally: Turn It Up	2013	
"Repercussions"	Bea Miller	Julia Michaels; Bea Miller; Jesse Shatkin; Justin Tranter	Aurora	2018	
"Revival"	Selena Gomez	Rock Mafia; Hit-Boy; Justin Tranter; Julia Michaels; IN-Q; Selena Gomez	Revival	2015	
"Revolving Door"	Tate McRae	Tate McRae; Ryan Tedder; Grant Boutin	So Close to What	2025	
"Ribbons and Bows"	Kacey Musgraves	Kacey Musgraves; Julia Michaels; Justin Tranter	A Very Kacey Christmas	2016	
"Right Here"	Zara Larsson	Julia Michaels; Justin Tranter; Mattman & Robin	Poster Girl	2021	
"Right Moves"	Christina Aguilera featuring Keida and Shenseea	Christina Aguilera; Keida; Shenseea; Julia Michaels; Justin Tranter; Tayla Parx; Bryan Nelson; Kosine	Liberation	2018	
"Rock Bottom"	Hailee Steinfeld (Note: The single version of "Rock Bottom" features DNCE.)	Julia Michaels; Justin Tranter; Mattman & Robin	Haiz	2015	
"Rocket Ship"	Gwen Stefani	Gwen Stefani; Justin Tranter; Julia Michaels; J. R. Rotem; Teal Douville	This Is What the Truth Feels Like	2016	
"Run"	Nicole Scherzinger	Justin Tranter; Julia Michaels; Felix Snow	Big Fat Lie	2014	
"Send Me a Picture"	Gwen Stefani	Gwen Stefani; Justin Tranter; Julia Michaels; Greg Kurstin	This Is What the Truth Feels Like	2016	
"Shouldn't Have Said It"	Julia Michaels	Julia Michaels; Justin Tranter	Inner Monologue Part 2	2019	
"Sink In"	Amy Shark	Benjamin Berger; Ryan McMahon; Julia Michaels	Love, Simon	2018	
"Skateboard"	Jacob Sartorius	Ian Kirkpatrick; Julia Michaels	Left Me Hangin'	2017	
"Skinny Dipping"	Sabrina Carpenter	Sabrina Carpenter; Julia Michaels; JP Saxe; Leroy Clampitt	TBA	2021	
"Slow Down"	Selena Gomez	Lindy Robbins; Julia Michaels; Kshmr; David Kuncio; Freddy Wexler	Stars Dance	2013	
"Slumber Party"	Britney Spears (Note: The single version of "Slumber Party" features Tinashe.)	Julia Michaels; Justin Tranter; Mattman & Robin	Glory	2016	
"So Good"	Dove Cameron	Ariel Rechtshaid; Julia Michaels; Justin Tranter; Dove Cameron; Tommy King	Non-album single	2019	
"Sorry"	Justin Bieber	Justin Bieber; BloodPop; Skrillex; Justin Tranter; Julia Michaels	Purpose	2015	
"Sports Car"	Tate McRae	Tate McRae; Ryan Tedder; Grant Boutin	So Close To What	2025	
"Starin' at It"	Maliibu N Helene	Dem Jointz; Jennifer Roberts; Julia Michaels	Non-album single	2014	
"Straight into the Fire"†	Zedd	Zedd; Julia Michaels; Sam Martin; Lindy Robbins; Mark Nilan Jr.	True Colors	2015	
"Surefire"	John Legend	John Legend; Julia Michaels; Will Oldham	Darkness and Light	2016	
"Surrender"†	Cash Cash	Cash Cash; Tal Meltzer; Julia Michaels; Philip Patterson; Lindy Robbins; Linus Wiklund	Blood, Sweat & 3 Years	2014	
"Take Care of You"	Ella Henderson	Ella Henderson; Noel Zancanella; Justin Tranter; Julia Michaels	Non-album single	2020	
"Take It Out on Me"	OneRepublic	Ryan Tedder; Julia Michaels; BloodPop	Human	2021	
"Talk You Down"	Charlotte Lawrence	Charlotte Lawrence; Andrew Watt; Julia Michaels; Michael Pollack; Mark Williams; Raul Cubina	Non-album single	2021	
"Taste"	Sabrina Carpenter	Sabrina Carpenter; Amy Allen; John Ryan; Ian Kirkpatrick	Short n' Sweet	2024	
"Telepath"	Conan Gray	Conan Gray; Julia Michaels; Ilya; Caroline Ailin	TBA	2021	
"Texas Man"	The Chicks	The Chicks; Jack Antonoff; Julia Michaels; Justin Tranter	Gaslighter	2020	
"That's the Kind of Woman"	Julia Michaels	Julia Michaels; Stefan Johnson; Jordan K. Johnson; Michael Pollack	Not in Chronological Order	2021	
"The Feeling"	Justin Bieber featuring Halsey	Justin Bieber; Halsey; Skrillex; Ian Kirkpatrick; Sarah Hudson; Julia Michaels; Clarence Coffee Jr.	Purpose	2015	
"The Kind of Lover I Am"	Demi Lovato	Demi Lovato; Julia Michaels; Caroline Pennell; Justin Tranter; Oak Felder; Trevor David Brown; William Zaire Simmons	Dancing with the Devil... the Art of Starting Over	2021	
"The Way That You Do"	Ross Lynch	Julia Michaels; Joleen L. Belle; Mike McGarity	Austin & Ally	2012	
"The Way You Don't Look at Me"	Demi Lovato	Demi Lovato; Justin Tranter; Eren Cannata; Julia Michaels; Jussifer; Caroline Pennell	Dancing with the Devil... the Art of Starting Over	2021	
"The Worst 30 Seconds"‡	Julia Michaels	Julia Michaels	Futuristic	2012	
"There's No Way" •	Lauv featuring Julia Michaels	Lauv; Julia Michaels; Justin Tranter; Ian Kirkpatrick	Non-album single	2018	
"They Don't Know Us"†	Borgeous	Borgeous; Julia Michaels; Lindy Robbins; Andrew Cedar; DJ Frank E	Non-album single	2015	
"This Is What We Dance For"	Jade	Jade Thirlwall; Julia Michaels; Peter Rycroft	That's Showbiz Baby! The Encore	2025	
"Tights on My Boat"	The Chicks	The Chicks; Jack Antonoff; Julia Michaels	Gaslighter	2020	
"Tit for Tat"	Tate McRae	Tate McRae; Ryan Tedder; Grant Boutin	So Close to What???	2025	
"Touch"	Pia Mia	Pia Mia; Julia Michaels; Justin Tranter; Stargate; BloodPop	Non-album single	2015	
"Trade Hearts" •	Jason Derulo featuring Julia Michaels	Jason Derulo; Julia Michaels; Pop & Oak	Everything Is 4	2015	
"Truce"	Lea Michele	Joleen Belle; Stephan Moccio; Julia Michaels	Places	2017	
"Truth"	Gwen Stefani	Gwen Stefani; Justin Tranter; Julia Michaels; Mattman & Robin	This Is What the Truth Feels Like	2016	
"Truth Is"	Sabrina Claudio	Sabrina Claudio; Julia Michaels; Kaveh Rastegar; Stephan Moccio	Truth Is	2019	
"Uh Huh"	Julia Michaels	Julia Michaels; Mattman & Robin; Justin Tranter	Nervous System	2017	
"Undercover"	Selena Gomez	Lindy Robbins; Julia Michaels; Kshmr; Rome Ramirez	Stars Dance	2013	
"Undertone"	Julia Michaels	Julia Michaels; Stefan Johnson; Jordan K. Johnson; Michael Pollack; Matt Zara	Not in Chronological Order	2021	
"Unlearn"	Benny Blanco with Gracie Abrams	Benny Blanco; Blake Slatkin; Gracie Abrams; Henry Kwapis; Jack Karaszewski; Julia Michaels; Cashmere Cat; Michael Pollack	Friends Keep Secrets 2	2021	
"Used to Love You"	Gwen Stefani	Gwen Stefani; Justin Tranter; Julia Michaels; J. R. Rotem; Teal Douville	This Is What the Truth Feels Like	2016	
"Waitin for You"	Demi Lovato featuring Sirah	Demi Lovato; Julia Michaels; Jason Evigan; Steve Mac; Sirah	Confident	2015	
"Walk My Way"	Brynn Cartelli	Julia Michaels; Justin Tranter; Nick Monson	Non-album single	2018	
"Wanna Know Love"	Jasmine Thompson	Jasmine Thompson; Julia Michaels; Justin Tranter; BloodPop	Wonderland	2017	
"War Paint"	Kelly Clarkson	Joleen Belle; Julia Michaels; Sir Nolan	Piece by Piece	2015	
"Way Too Long"	Keith Urban	Oscar Holter; Nate Ruess; Julia Michaels	Graffiti U	2018	
"What a Time"	Julia Michaels featuring Niall Horan	Julia Michaels; Justin Tranter; Casey Barth; Riley Knapp	Inner Monologue Part 1	2019	
"What You Do to Me"	John Legend	John Legend; Julia Michaels; Justin Tranter	Darkness and Light	2016	
"When a Woman"	Shakira	Shakira; Kurtis McKenzie; Jon Mills; Julia Michaels; Cashmere Cat; Justin Tranter	El Dorado	2017	
"Where Would I Be?"	Gwen Stefani	Gwen Stefani; Justin Tranter; Julia Michaels; Greg Kurstin	This Is What the Truth Feels Like	2016	
"Why'd You Have to Call"	Freya Skye	Freya Skye; Julia Michaels; Mattman & Robin	Stardust	2026	
"Wildfire"†	Borgeous	Borgeous; Julia Michaels; Lindy Robbins; Kshmr	Non-album single	2014	
"Words"	Jasmine Thompson	Jasmine Thompson; Julia Michaels; Justin Tranter; Oscar Görres; Oscar Holter	Wonderland	2017	
"Work Too Much"‡	Julia Michaels	Julia Michaels	Inner Monologue Part 2	2019	
"Worst in Me"	Julia Michaels	Julia Michaels; Mattman & Robin; Justin Tranter	Nervous System	2017	
"Wrapped Around"	Julia Michaels	Julia Michaels; John Ryan; Stefan Johnson; Jordan K. Johnson; Billy Walsh	Not in Chronological Order	2021	
"Wrong Move"	R3hab with THRDL!FE featuring Olivia Holt	R3hab; THRDL!FE; Samuel Lowe; Ferruccio Tebaldi; Carla Monroe; Julia Michaels; Two Inch Punch	The Wave	2018	
"Yes No Maybe"	Khalid	Khalid; Ilya Salmanzadeh; Julia Michaels; Pete Nappi	After the Sun Goes Down	2025	
"You're My Favorite"	Gwen Stefani	Gwen Stefani; Justin Tranter; Julia Michaels; Greg Kurstin	This Is What the Truth Feels Like	2016	
"You're Such A"	Hailee Steinfeld	Julia Michaels; Justin Tranter; Mattman & Robin	Haiz	2015	
"Housewife"	Tate McRae	Tate McRae Julia Michaels Ryan Tedder Jasper Harris Pablo Diaz-Reixa Grant Boutin	TBA	2026	

== International singles and certifications ==
List of written or produced contributions that were made singles, with year released, artist(s) involved, selected chart positions, certifications and album name. This also includes credited featured appearances, but not collaborations where Julia Michaels is labelled as primary.
Title	Year	Peak chart positions										Certifications	Album
Title	Year	US	CAN	AUS	BEL (FL)	NOR	GER	NZ	SWI	SWE	UK	Certifications	Album
"Miss Movin' On" (Fifth Harmony)	2013	76	—	—	—	—	—	27	—	—	—	RIAA: Gold	Better Together EP
"Slow Down" (Selena Gomez featuring The Cataracs)	2013	27	29	93	2	—	—	—	—	—	106	RIAA: Platinum; AMP: Gold	Stars Dance
"Invincible" (Borgeous)	2014	—	—	—	53	—	—	—	—	—	—		Non-album single
"Run" (Nicole Scherzinger)	2014	—	—	—	—	—	—	—	—	—	46		Big Fat Lie
"Poison" (Rita Ora)	2015	—	—	30	45	—	—	—	—	—	3	BPI: Gold; ARIA: Gold	Non-album single
"Papercut" (Zedd featuring Troye Sivan)	2015	—	—	93	—	—	—	—	—	—	—		True Colors
"Good for You" (Selena Gomez or featuring ASAP Rocky)	2015	5	8	10	25	9	29	14	25	24	23	RIAA: x3 Platinum; BPI: Gold; MC: x2 Platinum; ARIA: x2 Platinum; RMNZ: Gold; BVMI: Gold; FIMI: Platinum; GLF: x2 Platinum; IFPI DEN: Platinum; ZPAV: Platinum	Revival
"That's How You Know" (Nico & Vinz featuring Kid Ink and Bebe Rexha)	2015	—	—	2	—	2	65	17	—	62	—	ARIA: Platinum; RMNZ: Gold; IFPI NOR: x4 Platinum	Cornerstone EP
"Love Myself" (Hailee Steinfeld)	2015	30	15	92	4	20	—	19	64	35	180	RIAA: x2 Platinum; BPI: Gold; MC: x2 Platinum; RMNZ: Gold; FIMI: Platinum; GLF: Platinum; IFPI DEN: Gold	Haiz EP
"Me & the Rhythm" (Selena Gomez)	2015	—	57	—	—	—	—	—	—	—	—		Revival
"Hands to Myself" (Selena Gomez)	2015	7	5	13	50	18	52	5	40	20	14	RIAA: x2 Platinum; BPI: Platinum; MC: Platinum; ARIA: x2 Platinum; RMNZ: Platinum; IFPI DEN: Platinum; FIMI: Platinum; IFPI NOR: Gold; GLF: x2 Platinum	Revival
"Used to Love You" (Gwen Stefani)	2015	52	57	58	—	—	—	—	—	—	157	RIAA: Gold	This Is What the Truth; Feels Like
"Sorry" (Justin Bieber)	2015	1	1	2	2	2	3	1	2	1	1	RIAA: Diamond; BPI: x4 Platinum; MC: x7 Platinum; ARIA: x7 Platinum; RMNZ: x5 Platinum; BVMI: Platinum; FIMI: x6 Platinum; IFPI DEN: x4 Platinum; GLF: x7 Platinum; SNEP: Diamond	Purpose
"Touch" (Pia Mia)	2015	—	—	47	—	—	—	—	—	—	47	BPI: Silver	Non-album single
"The Feeling" (Justin Bieber featuring Halsey)	2015	31	25	22	—	32	—	20	—	34	34	RIAA: Platinum; BPI: Silver; GLF: Gold	Purpose
"Rock Bottom" (Hailee Steinfeld or featuring DNCE)	2015	—	61	39	—	—	—	—	—	—	—	RIAA: Platinum; RMNZ: Gold	Haiz EP
"Make Me Like You" (Gwen Stefani)	2016	54	62	97	31	—	—	—	—	—	140	RIAA: Gold	This Is What the Truth; Feels Like
"Misery" (Gwen Stefani)	2016	—	—	74	—	—	—	—	—	—	171		This Is What the Truth; Feels Like
"Close" (Nick Jonas featuring Tove Lo)	2016	14	12	37	33	—	61	11	39	41	25	RIAA: Platinum; BPI: Gold; RMNZ: Platinum; GLF: Platinum; IFPI DEN: Gold; FIMI: Gold	Last Year Was; Complicated
"Hurts So Good" (Astrid S)	2016	—	—	—	41	6	—	18	—	41	176	RIAA: Gold; BPI: Silver; IFPI DEN: Gold; GLF: Gold; FIMI: Gold; IFPI NOR: x3 Platinum	Astrid S EP
"Carry Me" (Kygo featuring Julia Michaels)	2016	—	—	77	40	39	—	—	—	—	133	MC: Gold	Cloud Nine
"All in My Head (Flex)" (Fifth Harmony featuring Fetty Wap)	2016	24	21	19	46	—	—	8	—	—	25	RIAA: Platinum; BPI: Gold; ARIA: Platinum; RMNZ: Gold; MC: Platinum; FIMI: Gold	7/27
"Slumber Party" (Britney Spears or featuring Tinashe)	2016	86	51	—	—	—	—	—	—	—	77		Glory
"Heavy" (Linkin Park featuring Kiiara)	2017	45	46	33	4	—	12	35	8	82	43	RIAA: Gold; BPI: Silver; ARIA: Gold; BVMI: Gold; FIMI: Gold; IFPI SWI: Gold	One More Light
"Dive" (Ed Sheeran)	2017	49	19	5	—	24	23	4	—	28	8	RIAA: Platinum; BPI: Platinum; MC: x2 Platinum; ARIA: x2 Platinum; RMNZ: Gold; IFPI DEN: Gold; FIMI: Platinum; AFP: Gold	÷ (Divide)
"One Mississippi" (Zara Larsson)	2017	—	—	—	—	—	—	—	—	26	—		So Good
"Bad Liar" (Selena Gomez)	2017	20	11	13	45	28	36	17	31	23	21	RIAA: Platinum; BPI: Gold; MC: Platinum; ARIA: Platinum; FIMI: Gold	Non-album single
"Either Way" (Snakehips and Anne-Marie featuring Joey Badass)	2017	—	—	64	—	—	—	—	—	—	47	BPI: Silver	Non-album single
"Friends" (Justin Bieber and BloodPop)	2017	20	4	2	15	1	4	2	3	2	2	RIAA: Platinum; BPI: Platinum; MC: x2 Platinum; ARIA: x2 Platinum; RMNZ: Gold; BVMI: Platinum; FIMI: x2 Platinum; IFPI DEN: Platinum; GLF: Gold; PME: Gold	Non-album single
"Drew Barrymore" (Bryce Vine)	2017	46	89	—	—	—	—	—	—	—	—		Carnival
"Help Me Out" (Maroon 5 featuring Julia Michaels)	2017	—	80	83	—	—	—	—	—	—	—		Red Pill Blues
"I Miss You" (Clean Bandit featuring Julia Michaels)	2017	92	50	20	5	18	49	17	43	34	4	RIAA: Gold; BPI: x2 Platinum; MC: x2 Platinum; ARIA: x3 Platinum; RMNZ: Gold; BVMI: Gold; FIMI: Gold; BEA: Platinum; IFPI DEN: Platinum; SNEP: Gold	What Is Love?
"Parallel Line" (Keith Urban)	2018	—	—	47	—	—	—	—	—	—	—	RIAA: Gold; ARIA: Platinum	Graffiti U
"Make Me Feel" (Janelle Monae)	2018	99	98	—	3	—	—	—	—	—	74	RIAA: Gold	Dirty Computer
"Coming Home" (Keith Urban featuring Julia Michaels)	2018	50	84	84	—	—	—	—	—	—	—		Graffiti U
"2002" (Anne-Marie)	2018	—	49	4	23	24	18	12	18	30	3	RIAA: Platinum; BPI: x2 Platinum; MC: Platinum; ARIA: x4 Platinum; RMNZ: Platinum; BVMI: Gold; FIMI: Gold; BEA: Gold; IFPI SWI: Platinum; IFPI DEN: Platinum	Speak Your Mind
"Nervous" (Shawn Mendes)	2018	—	66	51	—	—	86	—	59	71	54	MC: Gold; PMB: Gold; AMPFV: Gold	Shawn Mendes
"Like to Be You" (Shawn Mendes featuring Julia Michaels)	2018	—	—	74	—	—	—	—	—	—	—		Shawn Mendes
"There's No Way" (Lauv featuring Julia Michaels)	2018	—	—	37	17	—	—	—	86	94	—	RIAA: Gold; ARIA: Platinum	Non-album single
"Lie to Me" (5 Seconds of Summer or featuring Julia Michaels)	2018	—	—	38	—	—	—	—	—	—	99	ARIA: Platinum; MC: Gold; ZPAV: Gold	Youngblood
"Peer Pressure" (James Bay featuring Julia Michaels)	2019	—	—	68	38	—	—	—	88	—	85	MC: Gold; AFP: Gold	Oh My Messy Mind EP
"If the World Was Ending" (JP Saxe featuring Julia Michaels)	2019	27	13	29	13	16	—	20	56	32	14	RIAA: Platinum; BPI: Platinum; MC: x4 Platinum; ARIA: Platinum; RMNZ: Platinum; BEA: Platinum; ZPAV: Gold; AMPFV: Platinum; IFPI AUT: Gold	Hold It Together EP
"Lose You to Love Me" (Selena Gomez)	2019	1	1	2	7	2	7	2	2	6	3	RIAA: x2 Platinum; BPI: Platinum; MC: x2 Platinum; ARIA: x2 Platinum; RMNZ: Gold; BEA: Gold; IFPI NOR: Platinum; FIMI: Gold; PME: Gold; SNEP: Gold	Rare
"Look at Her Now" (Selena Gomez)	2019	27	13	29	9	15	43	23	20	53	26	ZPAV: Gold	Rare
"Boyfriend" (Selena Gomez)	2020	59	66	54	41	—	86	—	63	—	55		Rare: Deluxe Edition
"Take Care of You" (Ella Henderson)	2020	—	—	—	—	—	—	—	—	—	50		TBA
"Love Me Land" (Zara Larsson)	2020	—	—	—	—	—	—	—	—	8	—	GLF: Gold	Poster Girl
"Cotton Candy" (Yungblud)	2020	—	—	—	46	—	—	—	—	—	98		Weird!
"Fever" (Dua Lipa and Angele)	2020	—	79	—	1	—	85	—	9	—	79	BEA: x2 Platinum; SNEP: Gold	Future Nostalgia
