= Poster Girl Tour =

2021–22 concert tour by Zara Larsson

- Arena tour by Zara Larsson
- Promotional tour poster
- Location: Europe
- Associated album: Poster Girl
- Start date: 19 November 2021
- End date: 20 August 2022
- Legs: 1
- No. of shows: 22
- Supporting acts: Jelassi; Musti; Emma Steinbakken; Szim

Zara Larsson concert chronology
- Don't Worry Bout Me Tour (2019); Poster Girl Tour (2021–22); Venus Tour (2024)

The Poster Girl Tour was the third concert tour by Swedish singer-songwriter Zara Larsson, in support of her third studio album Poster Girl (2021). Promoted by Live Nation Entertainment, the tour commenced on 19 November 2021, in Gothenburg, Sweden. It concluded in Oslo on 20 August, comprising 22 shows.

== Background ==
On 26 May 2021, Larsson announced through social media that she would be touring the Nordic countries in 2021. She also announced that Jelassi, Musti, Emma Steinbakken, Pihlaja and Szim would be the opening acts for the tour. The tickets went on sale on 28 May 2021. Due to COVID-19 concerns, Larsson announced that the date in Helsinki had been cancelled. Before his sudden and unexpected death, the Swedish rapper Einár had been announced as the opening act for the shows in Sweden. Due to demand, Larsson added one date for Skellefteå on 27 November 2021.

Before the tour beginning, Larsson performed at several major music festivals, including RIX FM Festival in Stockholm, The Big Feastival in United Kingdom and Manchester Pride Festival in England. In December 2021, Larsson announced the dates for her European major festival tour for June, July and August 2022.

== Set list ==
This set list is from the show on 19 November 2021 in Gothenburg. It is not intended to represent all concerts for the tour.

1. "Love Me Land"
2. "I Would Like"
3. "FFF"
4. "Ruin My Life"
5. "Last Summer"
6. "Poster Girl"
7. "Ain't My Fault" / "Way 2 Sexy" (Dance)
8. "Wow"
9. "I Need Love"
10. "Carry You Home"
11. "Right Here"
12. "Like It Is" / "This One's for You"
13. "I Can't Fall in Love Without You"
14. "Look What You've Done"
15. "Lay All Your Love on Me" (ABBA cover)
16. "Symphony"
17. "Säg Mig Var Du Står"
18. "Never Forget You"

Encore

19. "Uncover"
20. "Lush Life"

== Tour dates ==
List of 2021 concerts
Date	City	Country	Venue
19 November 2021	Gothenburg	Sweden	Scandinavium
20 November 2021	Oslo	Norway	Spektrum
21 November 2021	Stockholm	Sweden	Avicii Arena
27 November 2021	Skellefteå	Sweden	Sara kulturhus

List of 2022 concerts
Date	City	Country	Venue
11 June 2022	Bratislava	Slovakia	Lovestream Festival
17 June 2022	Bergen	Norway	Bergen International Festival
18 June 2022	Fredrikstad	Norway	Idyll Festivalen
19 June 2022	Landgraaf	Netherlands	Pinkpop Festival
22 June 2022	Stockholm	Sweden	Gröna Lund
23 June 2022	Odense	Denmark	Tinderbox
29 June 2022	Gothenburg	Sweden	Liseberg
7 July 2022	Töreboda	Sweden	Törebodafestivalen
8 July 2022	Sundsvall	Sweden	Sensommar festival
9 July 2022	Madrid	Spain	Mad Cool Festival
15 July 2022	Helsingborg	Sweden	Bayside Festival
22 July 2022	Debrecen	Hungary	Campus Fesztivál
29 July 2022	Norrköping	Sweden	Hugo Park Festival
5 August 2022	Skellefteå	Sweden	Skellefteå Summertime
7 August 2022	Rumšiškės	Lithuania	Granatos Live Festival
12 August 2022	Turku	Finland	Aura Fest
20 August 2022	Oslo	Norway	Findings Festival

=== Cancelled shows ===
List of cancelled concerts, showing date, city, country, venue and reason for postponement
Date	City	Country	Venue	Reason
24 November 2021	Helsinki	Finland	Hartwall Arena	COVID-19 pandemic
3 December 2021	Copenhagen	Denmark	Royal Arena	Health problems
10 December 2021	Braga	Portugal	Authentica Festival	Festival cancelled
