= Not in Chronological Order =

Studio album by Julia Michaels
- Released: April 30, 2021
- Studios: M&S (Sherman Oaks, California); Woodshed Studios and Playpen (Malibu, California); EastWest (Hollywood, California)
- Length: 29:39
- Label: Republic
- Producers: The Monsters & Strangerz; German; John Ryan; G Koop

Julia Michaels chronology
Inner Monologue Part 2 (2019)	Not in Chronological Order (2021)	Second Self (2025)

Singles from Not in Chronological Order
- 1. "Lie Like This" Released: October 1, 2020; 2. "All Your Exes" Released: March 26, 2021; 3. "Love Is Weird" Released: April 15, 2021

Not in Chronological Order is the debut studio album by American singer-songwriter Julia Michaels, released on April 30, 2021, by Republic Records. The album's subject matter centers on themes of love, self reflection and ideal womanhood.

Upon its release, Not in Chronological Order received generally positive reviews. However, the album became Michael's lowest charting release on the Billboard 200, where it reached number 183; Michaels blamed Republic's lack of promotional support for the album as the cause of its lack of success.

== Background and release ==
Michaels released her debut single "Issues" in 2017, followed by three extended plays (EP), Nervous System (2017), Inner Monologue Part 1 and Inner Monologue Part 2 (both 2019). In 2020, she released the single "Lie Like This", followed by "All Your Exes" and "Love Is Weird" the following year. On April 9, 2021, it was announced that Michaels would release her debut studio album on April 30. She confirmed it on April 14, along with the album's name as Not in Chronological Order and its artwork.

== Critical reception ==
Professional ratings
Aggregate scores
Source	Rating
Metacritic	70/100
Review scores
Source	Rating
AllMusic	4.5/5 stars
Clash	8/10
The Forty-Five	3.5/5 stars
The Guardian	3/5 stars
NME	4/5 stars
Rolling Stone	2/5 stars

At Metacritic, which assigns a normalized rating out of 100 to reviews from mainstream critics, the album has an average score of 70 out of 100, which indicates "generally favorable reviews" based on 5 reviews. Clash's Randy Radic thought Not in Chronological Order is soft in certain parts and "thick with sinew" in others, and equally allows Michaels to showcase her songwriting talent and "charismatic, oh-so-expressive voice". Alexis Petridis of The Guardian considered the album enjoyable and a display of Michaels's talent, but lacking in star quality. Writing for NME, Hannah Mylrea was favorable of its depiction of romance and Michaels's signature one-liners, adding, it "confidently chronicles every dizzying high and crushing blow that love brings – affairs of the heart have, after all, long been Michaels' specialist songwriting subject".

== Track listing ==
Not in Chronological Order track listing
No.	Title	Writer(s)	Producer(s)	Length
1.	"All Your Exes"	Julia Michaels; JP Saxe; Stefan Johnson; Jordan K. Johnson; Oliver Peterhof	The Monsters & Strangerz; German	3:29
2.	"Love Is Weird"	Michaels; John Ryan; S. Johnson; J. Johnson; Billy Walsh	The Monsters & Strangerz; Ryan	2:30
3.	"Pessimist"	Michaels; Ryan; S. Johnson; J. Johnson; Robert Mandell	The Monsters & Strangerz; Ryan; G Koop	3:18
4.	"Little Did I Know"	Michaels; Saxe	The Monsters & Strangerz; German	3:16
5.	"Orange Magic"	Michaels; Ryan	Ryan	2:54
6.	"Lie Like This"	Michaels; S. Johnson; J. Johnson; Michael Pollack	The Monsters & Strangerz	3:38
7.	"Wrapped Around"	Michaels; Ryan; S. Johnson; J. Johnson; Walsh	The Monsters & Strangerz; Ryan	2:43
8.	"History"	Michaels; Ryan	Ryan	2:20
9.	"Undertone"	Michaels; S. Johnson; J. Johnson; Pollack; Matt Zara	The Monsters & Strangerz	3:16
10.	"That's the Kind of Woman"	Michaels; S. Johnson; J. Johnson; Pollack	The Monsters & Strangerz	2:15
Total length:				29:39

Target exclusive bonus track
No.	Title	Writer(s)	Producer(s)	Length
11.	"Lie Like This" (acoustic)	Michaels; S. Johnson; J. Johnson; Pollack	The Monsters & Strangerz	3:36

== Personnel ==
Musicians

- Julia Michaels – vocals (all tracks), background vocals (5, 9, 10)
- JP Saxe – guitar (1)
- German – programming (1)
- The Monsters & Strangerz – programming (1–3, 6, 9, 10), guitar (2), keyboards (2–4, 7, 9, 10)
- John Ryan – background vocals, guitar, keyboards, programming (2, 3, 5, 8); drums, synthesizer programming (5)
- David Campbell – string arranger (2, 4, 7, 10)
- G Koop – guitar (3)
- India Carney – background vocals (4)
- Mario Jose – background vocals (4)
- Michael Pollack – background vocals, keyboards (6)
- Pierre Luc – guitar (6)
- Matt Zara – guitar (9)
- Chris Null – guitar (10)

Technical

- Randy Merrill – mastering engineer
- Serban Ghenea – mixer
- Ben Rice – engineer, vocal producer (1, 4)
- Steve Churchyard – engineer (2, 4, 7, 10)
- John Ryan – engineer, vocal producer (5, 8)
- Jeff Gunnell – engineer (5, 8)
- Stefan Johnson – engineer (6, 7, 9), vocal producer (3)
- Michael Pollack – engineer, vocal producer (10)
- Gian Stone – vocal producer (3, 9)
- The Monsters & Strangerz – vocal producer (6, 7, 9)
- Bo Bodnar – assistant recording engineer (2, 4, 7, 10)

== Charts ==
Chart performance
Chart (2021)	Peak position
Australian Albums (ARIA)	91
Canadian Albums (Billboard)	97
Germany Downloads (Official German Charts)	76
UK Album Downloads (Official Charts)	69
US Billboard 200	183

== Release history ==
Release dates and formats
Region	Date	Format	Version	Label	Ref.
Various	April 30, 2021	CD; digital download; streaming	Standard	Republic	
United States	April 30, 2021	CD	Target bonus	Republic	
United States	August 6, 2021	LP	Standard	Republic	
