= Venus Tour =

2024 concert tour by Zara Larsson

- Tour by Zara Larsson
- Promotional tour poster
- Associated album: Venus
- Start date: February 16, 2024
- End date: November 7, 2024
- Legs: 2
- No. of shows: 24

Zara Larsson concert chronology
- Poster Girl Tour (2021–2022); Venus Tour (2024); Midnight Sun Tour (2025–2026)

The Venus Tour was the fourth concert tour by Swedish pop singer Zara Larsson, in support of her fourth studio album, Venus (2024). The tour marked Larsson's return to international touring following her previous tour, the Poster Girl Tour, which was based in Europe across 2021 and 2022. The Venus Tour officially began on February 16, 2024, in Manchester, United Kingdom, and concluded on November 7, 2024, in New York City, United States. Following the announcement of Venus, Larsson confirmed the Venus Tour on October 26, 2023, through her official Instagram account.

== Tour dates ==
List of concerts
Date	City	Country	Venue	Opening act
February 16, 2024	Manchester	England	Manchester Academy	Yaeger
February 17, 2024	Glasgow	Scotland	O2 Academy Glasgow	Yaeger
February 18, 2024	Birmingham	England	O2 Academy Birmingham	Yaeger
February 21, 2024	London	England	Roundhouse	Yaeger
February 22, 2024	London	England	Roundhouse	Yaeger
February 24, 2024	Paris	France	Le Trianon	Yaeger
February 25, 2024	Brussels	Belgium	Ancienne Belgique	Yaeger
February 26, 2024	Amsterdam	Netherlands	AFAS Live	Yaeger
February 28, 2024	Berlin	Germany	Verti Music Hall	Yaeger
March 1, 2024	Cologne	Germany	Palladium	Yaeger
March 2, 2024	Milan	Italy	Fabrique	Yaeger
March 4, 2024	Zurich	Switzerland	Komplex 457	Yaeger
March 6, 2024	Prague	Czech Republic	Forum Karlín	Yaeger
March 7, 2024	Warsaw	Poland	Arena COS Torwar	Yaeger
March 8, 2024	Vienna	Austria	Vienna Gasometers	Yaeger
March 16, 2024	Reykjavík	Iceland	Harpa	Yaeger
October 27, 2024	Dallas	United States	House of Blues	—
October 29, 2024	Atlanta	United States	Center Stage	—
October 30, 2024	Lake Buena Vista (Note: Labeled as Orlando)	United States	House of Blues	—
November 1, 2024	Washington, D.C.	United States	9:30 Club	—
November 3, 2024	Toronto	Canada	Phoenix Concert Theatre	—
November 5, 2024	Boston	United States	Royale	—
November 6, 2024	New York City	United States	Webster Hall	—
November 7, 2024	New York City	United States	Webster Hall	—
Total
