= Talk About Love (Zara Larsson song) =

Single by Zara Larsson featuring Young Thug

from the album Poster Girl
- Released: 8 January 2021
- Genre: R&B
- Length: 3:20
- Label: TEN; Epic
- Songwriters: Amy Allen; Mike Sabath; Dewain Whitmore Jr.; Jeffery Lamar Williams
- Producer: Mike Sabath

Zara Larsson singles chronology
"Wow" (2020)	"Talk About Love" (2021)	"Look What You've Done" (2021)

Young Thug singles chronology
"Take It to Trial" (2020)	"Talk About Love" (2021)	"Bad Boy" (2021)

Music video
- "Talk About Love" on YouTube

"Talk About Love" is a song by Swedish singer and songwriter Zara Larsson, featuring American rapper Young Thug. It was released through TEN Music Group and Epic Records on 8 January 2021 as the fourth and final single from Larsson's third studio album, Poster Girl. It was co-written by Thug and its producer Mike Sabath, as well as Amy Allen and Dewain Whitmore Jr. It has been described as a R&B-styled song.

== Background ==
Larsson explained about the song, "'Talk About Love' is about that phase before two people work out what they are to one another. That specific window is so beautiful and fragile, as soon as you start asking 'are we doing this?' or 'how do *you* feel?', for some people that ruins the magic. 'Talk About Love' is savoring that moment before you have to decide."

== Music video ==
The music video directed by Larsson herself along with Ryder Ripps was filmed in London and features Larsson's real life boyfriend Lamin Holmén. It was premiered on 8 January 2021 and includes an "emotive dance sequence" while the couple hangs out at home.

== Charts ==
Chart (2021)	Peak position
Czech Republic Airplay (ČNS IFPI)	63
New Zealand Hot Singles (RMNZ)	18
Sweden (Sverigetopplistan)	21
US Pop Airplay (Billboard)	33
