= If You Need Me (Julia Michaels song) =

Single by Julia Michaels
- Released: September 13, 2019
- Length: 3:36
- Label: Republic
- Songwriter(s): Julia Michaels; JP Saxe; Benjamin Rice
- Producer(s): Benjamin Rice

Julia Michaels singles chronology
| "Hurt Again" (2019) | "If You Need Me" (2019) | "If the World Was Ending" (2019) |

Music video
- "If You Need Me" on YouTube

"If You Need Me" is a song by American singer-song writer Julia Michaels and recorded for the Facebook Watch series, Sorry for Your Loss, a series based on a group of women who have also experienced loss in their lives. The song was released on September 13, 2019.

== Music video ==
The video features footage of Michaels personally meeting members of the Sorry for Your Loss community on Facebook. In a statement released along with the video, Michaels said "When I first met Carol [one of the group members], she said those women were a tribe. There are many people out there who are willing to love you, and willing to listen – you just have to find the right people who will do that. When I read all the comments around Sorry for Your Loss, about everybody being there for each other, I sort of wanted to write [the song] from that angle. I think that's one of the best parts about songwriting, that I can channel someone's feelings and put them into a song."

== Reception ==
Mike Wass from Idolator called it "the kind of emotional, anthemic track that gets under your skin from the very first listen."

== Charts ==
| Chart (2019) | Peak position |
|---|---|
| New Zealand Hot Singles (RMNZ) | 19 |

== Release history ==
| Region | Date | Format | Label | Ref. |
|---|---|---|---|---|
| Various | September 13, 2019 | Digital download; streaming | Republic Records | |
