= Hold It Together =

EP by JP Saxe
- Released: February 7, 2020
- Recorded: 2019
- Labels: Arista, Sony

JP Saxe chronology
Both Can Be True: Part 1 (2018)	Hold It Together (2020)	Dangerous Levels of Introspection (2021)

Singles from Hold It Together
- 1. "If the World Was Ending" Released: October 17, 2019; 2. "Sad Corny Fuck" Released: February 7, 2020

Hold It Together is the second EP by Canadian singer JP Saxe. It was released on February 7, 2020, by Arista Records and Sony Music. The EP peaked at number 53 on the Canadian Albums Chart. It includes the singles "If the World Was Ending" and "Sad Corny Fuck".

== Background ==
Talking about the EP, Saxe said, "About two years of songwriting compiled into what I felt was the way I was introducing myself, my first body of work. Then I'll go back to those journals and pick out lines that feel like they could start a song or seem like they could be important. And that's how every one of these songs started. I'm not trying to conceptualize some grand artistic thing. My subject matter doesn't change cause it's just my life and therefore they all seem to go together."

== Singles ==
"If the World Was Ending" was released as the lead single from the EP on October 17, 2019. The song peaked at number 13 on the Canadian Hot 100. The third music video for the song was titled "If the World Was Ending (In Support of Doctors Without Borders)" featuring music artists was released on April 30, 2020. Sam Smith, H.E.R., Alessia Cara, Niall Horan, Keith Urban and Finneas (the song's producer) are among the long list of names who sing Saxe and Michaels’ duet. Each artist filmed their part on their phones from their homes while self-isolating. All proceeds benefit Doctors Without Borders, and the video ends with a special message from a participating doctor about the impact of COVID-19 on countries where many of the doctors are stationed. "We are so grateful for the incredible work being done by those on the frontlines during this global pandemic." Saxe and Michael said in a joint statement. "At a time when it can sometimes feel like ‘the world is ending,’ we thank all of the healthcare workers, first responders, and essential workers who are helping so many people in need. Please stay home, stay safe (and don't actually go over!)." "Sad Corny Fuck" was released as the second single from the EP on February 7, 2020.

== Track listing ==
No.	Title	Writer(s)	Producer(s)	Length
1.	"25 in Barcelona"	Jonathan Percy Starker Saxe; Khris Riddick-Tynes; Ryan Marrone	Saxe; Marrone	3:13
2.	"If the World Was Ending" (featuring Julia Michaels)	Saxe; Julia Michaels	Finneas	3:31
3.	"Sad Corny Fuck"	Saxe; Marrone	Marrone	3:40
4.	"3 Minutes"	Saxe; Marrone	Marrone	3:31
5.	"Explain You"	Saxe; Marrone	Benjamin Rice; Marrone	3:18
6.	"Hold It Together"	Saxe; Rice	Rice; Marrone	3:39

== Chart performance ==
Chart (2020)	Peak position
Canadian Albums (Billboard)	53

== Certifications ==
Region	Certification	Certified units/sales
Canada (Music Canada)	Gold	40,000^{‡}
New Zealand (RMNZ)	Gold	7,500^{‡}
^{‡} Sales+streaming figures based on certification alone.
