= Wow (Zara Larsson song) =

2020 single by Zara Larsson

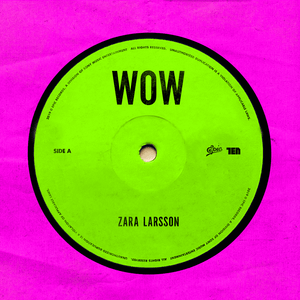

Single by Zara Larsson

from the album Poster Girl
- Released: 26 August 2020
- Genre: Electro; EDM
- Length: 2:59
- Label: TEN; Epic
- Songwriters: Brittany Amaradio; Christopher Comstock; Thomas Eriksen; Joakim Haukaas; Madison Love
- Producer: Marshmello

Zara Larsson singles chronology
"Love Me Land" (2020)	"Wow" (2020)	"Talk About Love" (2021)

Music video
- "WOW" on YouTube

"Wow" (stylized as "WOW") is a song by Swedish singer and songwriter Zara Larsson. It was released as a promotional single on 26 April 2019 through TEN Music Group and Epic Records. It was co-written and produced by Marshmello. The song was featured in the 2020 Netflix movie Work It and was announced by Larsson to be released as a single on 26 August 2020. It serves as the third single from Larsson's third studio album Poster Girl. A remix of the song featuring American singer Sabrina Carpenter was released on 25 September 2020.

== Background ==
The song was first used in an advertisement for Citibank in the United States. It was then registered on music recognition app Shazam, and on 10 April 2019, the official verified Genius account of Larsson's label TEN Music Group added the song's release date as 26 April 2019, which makes it a month after the release of Larsson's single "Don't Worry Bout Me".

== Composition ==
The song is written in the key of F-sharp minor with a tempo of 155 beats per minute.

== Critical reception ==
Mike Wass of Idolator characterised the song as about "feeling sexy in your own skin", calling it an "exciting addition to Zara’s discography" and complimenting its "magnificent post-chorus drop".

== Sabrina Carpenter remix ==
"Wow (Remix)"
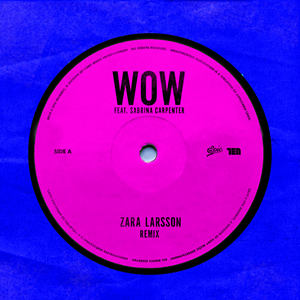

Single by Zara Larsson featuring Sabrina Carpenter
- Released: 25 September 2020
- Length: 2:59
- Label: TEN; Epic
- Songwriters: Sabrina Carpenter; Brittany Amaradio; Christopher Comstock; Thomas Eriksen; Joakim Haukaas; Madison Love
- Producer: Marshmello

Sabrina Carpenter singles chronology
"Tricky" (2020)	"Wow (Remix)" (2020)	"Skin" (2021)

Music video
- "Wow (Remix)" on YouTube

A remix of the song featuring Sabrina Carpenter was released on 25 September 2020. Its music video premiered on 7 October.

== Charts ==
Chart (2019–2020)	Peak position
Ireland (IRMA)	95
New Zealand Hot Singles (RMNZ)	37
Scotland Singles (Official Charts)	4
Sweden (Sverigetopplistan)	27
UK Singles Downloads (Official Charts)	42
US Dance Airplay (Billboard)	11
US Digital Song Sales (Billboard)	38
US Pop Airplay (Billboard)	31

== Certifications ==
Region	Certification	Certified units/sales
Brazil (Pro-Música Brasil)	Platinum	40,000^{‡}
Canada (Music Canada)	Gold	40,000^{‡}
New Zealand (RMNZ)	Gold	15,000^{‡}
Norway (IFPI Norway)	Gold	30,000^{‡}
Poland (ZPAV)	Gold	10,000^{‡}
United Kingdom (BPI)	Silver	200,000^{‡}
United States (RIAA)	Gold	500,000^{‡}
^{‡} Sales+streaming figures based on certification alone.
