= Poster Girl (album) =

- Standard cover

Studio album by Zara Larsson
- Released: 5 March 2021
- Recorded: 2018–2020
- Genres: Scandipop; pop; dance
- Length: 37:41
- Labels: TEN; Epic
- Producers: Jason Gill; Mike Sabath; Mattman & Robin; Marshmello; the Roommates; Starsmith; Steve Mac; the Monsters & Strangerz; Jackson Foote; the Struts; Ian Kirkpatrick; Mr. Franks; Tommy Brown

Zara Larsson chronology
So Good (2017)	Poster Girl (2021)	Honor the Light (2023)

Alternative cover
- Summer Edition cover

Singles from Poster Girl
- 1. "Ruin My Life" Released: 18 October 2018; 2. "Love Me Land" Released: 10 July 2020; 3. "Wow" Released: 26 August 2020; 4. "Talk About Love" Released: 8 January 2021

Poster Girl is the third studio album by Swedish singer and songwriter Zara Larsson. It was released internationally on 5 March 2021 by TEN Music Group and Epic Records. Recording sessions for the album began in 2018 and continued during the COVID-19 pandemic. Poster Girl is primarily a Scandipop, pop and dance record with elements of 80s synth-pop and disco.

Poster Girl was supported by the release of four singles; "Ruin My Life", "Love Me Land", "Wow", "Talk About Love" and one promotional single, "Look What You've Done". The album received generally positive reviews from music critics upon its release, with critics mainly complimenting its production. Commercially, the album debuted at number three on the Swedish Albums Chart, twelve on the UK Albums Chart, and reached the top twenty in several nations. Larsson embarked on the Poster Girl Tour in November 2021 to promote the album. A version of the album subtitled Summer Edition was released on 21 May 2021, and contains six additional recordings.

== Composition ==
Poster Girl is a Scandipop, pop, and dance record without ballads, incorporating a production influenced by 1980s synths and R&B. Its lyrical content "explore[s] the best and worst parts of pop music's bread and butter: love". It was additionally described as "both a break-up album and a loved-up celebration of a new romance", as well as "weaving themes of unrequited devotion and sobering flits of romantic toxicity into near scientifically engineered pop songs".

=== Songs ===
The opener "Love Me Land" is a dance-pop song built around a "pulsing, string-led" beat. "Talk About Love" is an R&B-styled song with a "mellow" feel, which, lyrically, is about the "phase before two people work out what they are to one another". "Need Someone" is a "glistening", midtempo tune, which has an "airy, easy-going vibe", but builds into a "much funkier, bigger anthem", and, musically, has a bassline reminiscent of Tame Impala's "The Less I Know the Better" and a "twinkly" piano line. "Right Here" is about a wondering of why she tries to get the attention of someone who "keeps his eyes on the screen", and references Swedish artist Robyn. "Wow" is an electro and EDM song produced by Marshmello, which has a "bold" bassline and "addictive" vocals. The album's title track is about Zara "feeling out of character as she develops a crush", backed by "glittery" disco production. "I Need Love" is a tropical pop song, that has been described as a "soulful bop", which includes the lyrics: "like an addict needs a drug". "Look What You've Done" is a disco-tinged, breakup track which bears resemblance to the music of ABBA.

"Ruin My Life" is a "faintly masochistic", pop song, which, in Larsson's words, is about "that unhealthy relationship that everyone has at one point in their life". Instrumentation-wise, it is accompanied by an electric guitar and keyboard, and its chorus is "swimming" with synths and a "danceable" drum track. "Stick with You", co-written by Max Martin, has a guitar sound paired with a "driving", electronic beat and sees Larsson's vocal with a "slight country twang". "FFF" (shorthand for "Falling for a Friend") is "playful", though "explicit"; its refrain is reminiscent of Italian classic "Tu Vuò Fà L'Americano". Vocals with similarity to Dua Lipa, on the song, sing: "Is there a spark for us?/Or is it just purely platonic?/Is this our story arc?/'Cause if it are, it'd be iconic". The album closes with "What Happens Here" has a story of self-assurance and is a "Carly Rae Jepsen-sized euphoric" song, in which she sings: "I'ma do it 'cause it's what I want… To be honest, I don't give no fucks".

== Release and promotion ==
Larsson shared Poster Girl's album cover on 8 January 2021 and revealed the track listing on social media on 10 February. To promote the record, Larsson held an online concert on 8 March for International Women's Day, in partnership with IKEA and presented by Live Nation.

The deluxe edition entitled the "Summer Edition" was released on 21 May, including two new songs and multiple new versions of past songs. To celebrate its release, she held a virtual album release party on Roblox that day, with reruns airing throughout that weekend. Larsson embarked on the Poster Girl Tour in support of the album in November.

=== Singles ===
Poster Girl was preceded by the lead single "Ruin My Life", released on 18 October 2018. It charted in multiple countries, reaching the top ten in Israel, United Kingdom, Ireland and her native Sweden, peaking at number two. Many standalone singles and collaborations followed between 2018 and 2020, including "Don't Worry Bout Me" and "All the Time". Both songs were later included on the album's Japanese deluxe edition.

The second single "Love Me Land" arrived on 10 July 2020, peaking at number eight and later being certificated Gold in Sweden. The previously released promotional single "Wow" made a resurgence in popularity after being featured on the 2020 Netflix original movie Work It, which led to Larsson releasing the track as a single. A remix featuring the film's lead actress Sabrina Carpenter was unveiled on 25 September 2020 with its own music video premiering on 7 October. Another single, "Talk About Love" featuring American rapper Young Thug came out on 8 January 2021 with the album's pre-order. "Look What You've Done" was released on 22 February 2021.

== Critical reception ==
Professional ratings
Aggregate scores
Source	Rating
AnyDecentMusic?	6.6/10
Metacritic	72/100
Review scores
Source	Rating
AllMusic	4/5 stars
The Arts Desk	3/5 stars
Clash	8/10
DIY	4/5 stars
Dork	5/5 stars
Evening Standard	3/5 stars
Financial Times	3/5 stars
The Independent	3/5 stars
NME	4/5 stars
Pitchfork	5.4/10

At Metacritic, which assigns a normalised to reviews from professional publications, Poster Girl has an average score of 72 out of 100, based on nine reviews, indicating "generally favourable reviews".

Writing for NME, Nick Levine described the album as a "catchy and characterful" one, that "feels like a job well done", while DIY's Emma Swann called the album "pure pop escapism". Robin Murray of Clash wrote that Poster Girl is "not all perfect", but an "entertaining" album. Ludovic Hunter-Tilney of the Financial Times described the songs as "nimble and breezy", though said that the album "leaves one impatient for more". Pitchfork criticized its dated production, clichéd lyrics, and lack of artistic identity, describing Larsson as difficult to distinguish from the album's influences.

== Track listing ==
Standard edition
No.	Title	Writer(s)	Producer(s)	Length
1.	"Love Me Land"	Zara Larsson; Julia Michaels; Justin Tranter; Jason Gill	Gill	2:40
2.	"Talk About Love" (featuring Young Thug)	Amy Allen; Mike Sabath; Dewain Whitmore Jr.; Jeffery Lamar Williams	Sabath	3:19
3.	"Need Someone"	Sarah Aarons; Noonie Bao; Mattias Larsson; Robin Fredriksson	Mattman & Robin	2:57
4.	"Right Here"	Michaels; Tranter; M. Larsson; Fredriksson	Mattman & Robin	3:46
5.	"Wow"	Brittany Amaradio; Christopher Comstock; Thomas Eriksen; Joakim Haukaas; Madison Love	Marshmello	2:59
6.	"Poster Girl"	Z. Larsson; Michaels; Tranter; David Pramik; Jon Wienner; Sam Homaee	The Roommates; Gill	2:57
7.	"I Need Love"	Camille Purcell; Joseph Kearns; Finlay Dow-Smith	Starsmith	3:02
8.	"Look What You've Done"	Z. Larsson; Max Wolfgang; Purcell; Ammar Malik; Steve Mac	Mac	3:01
9.	"Ruin My Life"	Amaradio; Michael Pollack; Stefan Johnson; Jordan K. Johnson; Jamie Sanderson; Jackson Foote	The Monsters & Strangerz; Foote	3:10
10.	"Stick with You"	Z. Larsson; Max Martin; Savan Kotecha; Ludvig Söderberg; Jakob Jerlström; Wolfgang	The Struts	2:59
11.	"FFF"	Z. Larsson; Michaels; Tranter; Ian Kirkpatrick	Kirkpatrick	3:32
12.	"What Happens Here"	Z. Larsson; Theron Thomas; Anton Göransson; Steven Franks; Tommy Brown	Mr. Franks; Brown	3:19
Total length:				37:41

Target edition
No.	Title	Writer(s)	Producer(s)	Length
13.	"Famous"	Jason Evigan; Aarons; Z. Larsson	Evigan	3:37
14.	"When I'm Not Around"	Z. Larsson; Kaj Hassle; Madison Love; James Wong	Gladius	3:29
Total length:				44:47

Japanese deluxe edition
No.	Title	Writer(s)	Producer(s)	Length
15.	"Don't Worry Bout Me"	Z. Larsson; Linnea Soddahl; Whitney Philips; Ebba Tove Nilsson; Rami Yacoub; Jerlstrom; Soderberg	The Struts	3:30
16.	"All the Time"	Z. Larsson; Ilsey Juber; Bao; Linus Wiklund	Lotus IV	3:48
Total length:				52:05

Summer edition
No.	Title	Writer(s)	Producer(s)	Length
13.	"Morning"	Caroline Ailin; Emily Warren; Guy James Robin; Alexander Shuckburgh	Al Shux	2:54
14.	"Last Summer"	Rachel Keen; Fred Ball	Keen; Ball	2:55
15.	"I Need Love" (featuring First Aid Kit; live version)	Purcell; Kearns; Dow-Smith	Lindvall	3:20
16.	"Ruin My Life" (orchestral version)	Amaradio; Michael Pollack; Stefan Johnson; Jordan K. Johnson; Jamie Sanderson; Jackson Foote		4:43
17.	"Never Forget You" (orchestral version featuring Sveriges Radios Symfoniorkester)	Uzoechi Osisioma Emenike; Z. Larsson; Aaron Davey		3:49
18.	"Right Here" (Alok remix)	Michaels; Tranter; M. Larsson; Fredriksson	Alok; Fredriksson	2:35
Total length:				57:49

Swedish Summer edition
No.	Title	Length
19.	"Säg Mig Var Du Står" (Carola featuring Zara Larsson)	3:25
Total length:		61:14

Summer edition reissue
No.	Title	Writer(s)	Producer(s)	Length
19.	"Morning" (Billen Ted remix)	Ailin; Warren; Robin; Shuckburgh	Al Shux	2:26
20.	"I Need Love" (featuring Trevor Daniel)	Purcell; Kearns; Dow-Smith	Lindvall	3:06
Total length:				63:21

== Personnel ==
=== Performers ===
- Zara Larsson – vocals
- Jason Gill – all instruments (1)
- Mattman & Robin – all instruments (3, 4)
- Noonie Bao – background vocals (3)
- Sarah Aarons – background vocals (3)
- Julia Michaels – background vocals (4)
- Marshmello – programming (5)
- Starsmith – all instruments (7)
- Chris Laws – drums (8)
- John Parricelli – guitar (8)
- Steve Mac – keyboards (8)
- Brittany Amaradio – background vocals (9)
- Jackson Foote – programming (9)
- Michael Pollack – piano (9)
- The Monsters & Strangerz – programming (9)
- A Strut – all instruments (10)
- Max Martin – background vocals (10)
- Fatmax Gsus – guitar (10)
- James Wong – synthesizer, guitar and drum programming (14)

=== Technical ===
- Emerson Mancini – mastering engineer
- Serban Ghenea – mixing engineer (1–4, 6, 7, 10, 15–16)
- Manny Marroquin – mixing engineer (5, 14)
- Mark "Spike" Stent – mixing engineer (8)
- Tony Maserati – mixing engineer (9)
- Rafael Fadul – mixing engineer (13)
- Lotus IV – mixing engineer (16)
- John Hanes – engineer (1–4, 6, 7, 10, 15–16)
- Jonathan Winner – engineer (6)
- Sam Homaee – engineer (6)
- Chris Laws – engineer (8)
- Dann Pursey – engineer (8)
- Ian Kirkpatrick – engineer (11)
- Bart Schoudel – vocal engineer (2, 3), recording engineer (4)
- Mattman & Robin – vocal engineer (3, 4)
- Hampus Lindvall – vocal engineer (7), recording engineer (9)
- Billy Hicks – recording engineer (12)
- Gian Stone – recording engineer (13)
- DJ Riggins – assistant engineer (2)
- Jacob Richards – assistant engineer (2)
- Mike Seaberg – assistant engineer (2)
- Robert N. Johnson – assistant engineer (5)

=== Artwork ===
- Ryder Ripps – creative and art direction
- Michaela Quan – photographer
- Jordan Rossi – photographer
- Karen Clarkson – stylist
- Sofia Sinot – make-up
- Ali Pirzadeh – hair

== Charts ==
=== Weekly charts ===
Weekly chart performance
Chart (2021)	Peak position
Australian Albums (ARIA)	59
Belgian Albums (Ultratop Flanders)	117
Belgian Albums (Ultratop Wallonia)	118
Dutch Albums (Album Top 100)	64
French Albums (SNEP)	182
Irish Albums (IRMA)	54
Japanese Albums (Oricon)	169
Lithuanian Albums (AGATA)	82
Norwegian Albums (VG-lista)	11
Scottish Albums (Official Charts)	13
Spanish Albums (Promusicae)	59
Swedish Albums (Sverigetopplistan)	3
Swiss Albums (Schweizer Hitparade)	67
UK Albums (Official Charts)	12
US Billboard 200	170

=== Year-end charts ===
Year-end chart performance
Chart (2021)	Position
Swedish Albums (Sverigetopplistan)	30

== Certifications ==
Certifications and sales
Region	Certification	Certified units/sales
Brazil (Pro-Música Brasil)	Gold	20,000^{‡}
Canada (Music Canada)	Platinum	80,000^{‡}
Norway (IFPI Norway)	2× Platinum	40,000^{‡}
Poland (ZPAV)	Gold	10,000^{‡}
Sweden (GLF)	Gold	15,000^{‡}
^{‡} Sales+streaming figures based on certification alone.

== Release history ==
Release dates and formats
Region	Date	Version	Format(s)	Label	Ref.
Various	5 March 2021	Standard	CD; cassette; digital download; streaming	TEN; Epic	
United Kingdom	5 March 2021	Standard	CD	Black Butter	
United States	5 March 2021	Target edition	CD	Epic	
Japan	10 March 2021	Japanese edition	CD	Epic; Sony	
Germany	26 March 2021	Standard	Vinyl	Epic; Sony	
Various	23 April 2021	Standard	Vinyl	Sony	
Various	21 May 2021	Summer edition	Digital download; streaming	TEN; Epic	
Sweden	21 May 2021	Swedish summer edition	Digital download; streaming	TEN	
Various	9 July 2021	Summer edition re-issue	Digital download; streaming	TEN; Epic	
Sweden	9 July 2021	Swedish summer edition re-issue	Digital download; streaming	TEN	
