= If the World Was Ending =

2019 song by JP Saxe featuring Julia Michaels

Single by JP Saxe featuring Julia Michaels

from the EP Hold It Together and the album Dangerous Levels of Introspection
- Released: October 17, 2019
- Recorded: July 20, 2019
- Length: 3:28
- Label: Arista
- Songwriters: Jonathan Percy Starker Saxe; Julia Michaels
- Producer: Finneas

JP Saxe singles chronology
"Women Who Look Like You" (2019)	"If the World Was Ending" (2019)	"Sad Corny Fuck" (2020)

Julia Michaels singles chronology
"If You Need Me" (2019)	"If the World Was Ending" (2019)	"Cool Anymore" (2019)

Music video
- "If the World Was Ending" on YouTube

"If the World Was Ending" is a song written and performed by Canadian singer JP Saxe featuring American singer Julia Michaels. The song was released by Arista Records on October 17, 2019, through digital download and streaming formats as the lead single from his second EP Hold It Together. It is also included on his debut studio album Dangerous Levels of Introspection. The song was nominated for Song of the Year at the 63rd Annual Grammy Awards, being Saxe's first and Michaels' third nomination.

== Background ==
Speaking to Billboard, Julia Michaels said "I discovered JP Saxe's music and posted about him around the same time he was listening to Inner Monologue. Since we were fans of each other's music, we got together for a writing session." Saxe added "Writing this song with Julia was one of the most creative experiences of my life. We wrote it the day we met and recorded it that same day." Michaels shared "The song is about that person in your life who you would come back to if the world was ending, when nothing else matters and there is nothing left to hold you back."

Regarding the sentiments evoked in the composition, Saxe expressed, "Hopefully we are looking for our sense of compassion. My hope is that it's resonating because it connects people to the part of themselves that wants to put love first, that wants to reach out to that family member they haven't talked to in a while, or that friend".

The duo recruited producer Finneas to finalize their piece. "We wanted to find a producer who was going to take up the integrity and emotional contour of our original demo and bring out what was already there. We put together our dream list of producers, and when we reached out to Finneas, he loved the song and told us he wanted to produce it. We were very excited for him to be part of it because he has such unique instincts when it comes to production. And he wanted what we wanted, which was to take the feeling of the song that was there and bring it out and accentuate that emotional world". Michaels says she is now over the song.

== Composition ==
"If the World Was Ending" is a piano ballad, played in the keys of A minor and F minor at a tempo of 75 beats per minute. During the chorus, Saxe and Michaels are heard singing the lines over layers of backing vocals. The instrumental consists of a piano, played by Finneas, and gospel vocals. In the second and final chorus, violins are played.

== About the lyrics ==
Throughout the song, JP Saxe, together with Julia Michaels, reminisces over a past and flawed relationship, hopefully it can start again with the best intentions and a good amount of patience. Saxe gives audiences a look into the piece's lyrics on Genius.com: "Julia scribed the lyrics at the end of the chorus. 'And there wouldn't be a reason why we would even have to say goodbye,' stabbed me in the heart when she first said it." Pondering the feeling that we don't have to wish each other farewell assures us all would be well. However, the reason for this lack of departure is dark and integrated into the removal of all consequences by the universe. Two situations exist in the song. The beginning situation happens amid a harmless earthquake. The imagined fantasy that occurs later asks, 'if everything did go to ruin, what would transpire?' The word: 'right.' holds a plethora of weight. It holds the doubt, hope, the question, 'are you with me on this?'. The term functions as the period mark following preceding events."

== Commercial performance ==
On the Hot 100 it debuted on 96 on April 11, 2020. It peaked at number 27 on the chart dated September 12, 2020, giving Saxe's first and Michaels's second top 40.

== Music videos ==
The music video, directed by Jason Lester, was released on October 17, 2019. After the Emergency Alert System warns of a “significant environmental event” hitting the United States, the video cuts to two lovers – JP Saxe and Julia – reviewing their last text conversation. As the National Oceanic and Atmospheric Administration instructs citizens to seek refuge in their nearest fallout shelter, JP reads how Julia needed some “space.” Suddenly, with extinction looming, the two reevaluate their priorities and are forced to decide just how they want to spend their last few hours on Earth.

Another music video titled "Spanglish Version" featuring Evaluna Montaner released on April 3, 2020.

The third video of the song was titled "If the World Was Ending (In Support of Doctors Without Borders)" featuring music artists was released on April 30, 2020. Sam Smith, H.E.R., Alessia Cara, Niall Horan, Keith Urban and Finneas (the song's producer) are among the long list of names who sing Saxe and Michaels' duet. Saxe explained that the collaboration was inspired by covers of the song he saw online, and he then texted the featured artists to ask if they'd want to get involved. Each artist filmed their part on their phones from their homes while self-isolating. All proceeds benefit Doctors Without Borders, where one of Saxe's friends worked, and the video ends with a special message from a participating doctor about the impact of COVID-19 on countries where many of the doctors are stationed.

"We are so grateful for the incredible work being done by those on the frontlines during this global pandemic," Saxe and Michaels said in a joint statement. "At a time when it can sometimes feel like 'the world is ending,' we thank all of the healthcare workers, first responders, and essential workers who are helping so many people in need. Please stay home, stay safe (and don't actually go over!)".

== Track listing ==
Digital download

1. "If the World Was Ending" – 3:28

Remixes

1. "If the World Was Ending" (Marian Hill remix) – 3:27
2. "If the World Was Ending" (Other remix) – 2:29
3. "If the World Was Ending" (Original) – 3:28

Covers

1. “If the World Was Ending” (Chaz Mazzota feat. Bella Raye) - Released November 22., 2019
2. “If the World Was Ending” (Nick Wayne & Hannah Ellis) - Released December 20, 2019
3. “If the World Was Ending” (Obe Lambert & Kato Faure) - Released December 27, 2019
4. “If the World Was Ending” EP (Kar4sing) - Released January 14, 2020
5. “If the World Was Ending” (Chester See, May Kelly & Christopher Harri) - Released March 3, 2020
6. “If the World Was Ending” (Jonah Baker feat. Celine) - Released March 16, 2020
7. “If the World Was Ending” (Kurt Hugo Schneider, Yoandri & Rain Paris) - Released March 17, 2020
8. “If the World Was Ending” (Santiago Pena feat. Daniela Pena) - Released May 15, 2020
9. “If the World Was Ending” (Jason Chen feat. Jules Aurora) - Released June 25, 2020
10. “If the World Was Ending” (Mike Covers feat. MoonCraft 3) - Released July 8, 2020
11. “If the World Was Ending” (Tiffany Alvord) - Released July 24, 2020
12. “If the World Was Ending” (Pablo Jara feat. Daphne Sofia) - Released August 10, 2020
13. “If the World Was Ending” (Renzo Mada) - Released August 30., 2020.
14. “If the World Was Ending” (Christopher Martin & Lia Caribe) Reggae remix - Released October 9, 2020
15. "If the World Was Ending" (Robyn Adele Anderson feat. David Simmons Jr.) - Released December 1, 2020
16. “If the World Was Ending” (Luis Angel Garcia feat. Rocio Ochoa) Spanish Version - Released December 8, 2020
17. “If the World Was Ending” (Shawn Mendes) - Released December 10, 2020

== Charts ==
=== Weekly charts ===
Chart (2019–2020)	Peak position
Australia (ARIA)	29
Austria (Ö3 Austria Top 40)	65
Belgium (Ultratop 50 Flanders)	13
Belgium (Ultratip Bubbling Under Wallonia)	18
Canada Hot 100 (Billboard)	13
Canada AC (Billboard)	7
Canada CHR/Top 40 (Billboard)	11
Canada Hot AC (Billboard)	7
Czech Republic Airplay (ČNS IFPI)	92
Czech Republic Singles Digital (ČNS IFPI)	78
Denmark (Tracklisten)	39
Global 200 (Billboard)	104
Ireland (IRMA)	17
Lithuania (AGATA)	59
Netherlands (Dutch Top 40)	23
Netherlands (Single Top 100)	25
New Zealand (Recorded Music NZ)	20
Norway (VG-lista)	16
Portugal (AFP)	76
Scottish Singles Sales (Official Charts)	7
Singapore (RIAS)	18
Slovakia Singles Digital (ČNS IFPI)	93
Sweden (Sverigetopplistan)	32
Switzerland (Schweizer Hitparade)	56
UK Singles (Official Charts)	14
US Billboard Hot 100	27
US Adult Contemporary (Billboard)	14
US Adult Pop Airplay (Billboard)	8
US Pop Airplay (Billboard)	9
US Rolling Stone Top 100	61

=== Year-end charts ===
Chart (2020)	Position
Australia (ARIA)	57
Belgium (Ultratop Flanders)	37
Canada (Canadian Hot 100)	14
Denmark (Tracklisten)	72
Iceland (Tónlistinn)	33
Netherlands (Single Top 100)	65
New Zealand (Recorded Music NZ)	44
Norway (VG-lista)	11
Portugal (AFP)	128
Sweden (Sverigetopplistan)	56
UK Singles (OCC)	47
US Billboard Hot 100	56
US Adult Contemporary (Billboard)	25
US Adult Top 40 (Billboard)	19
US Mainstream Top 40 (Billboard)	28

== Certifications ==
Region	Certification	Certified units/sales
Australia (ARIA)	3× Platinum	210,000^{‡}
Austria (IFPI Austria)	Platinum	30,000^{‡}
Belgium (BRMA)	Platinum	40,000^{‡}
Canada (Music Canada)	8× Platinum	640,000^{‡}
Denmark (IFPI Danmark)	2× Platinum	180,000^{‡}
France (SNEP)	Gold	100,000^{‡}
Germany (BVMI)	Gold	200,000^{‡}
Italy (FIMI)	Gold	35,000^{‡}
Mexico (AMPROFON)	Gold	30,000^{‡}
New Zealand (RMNZ)	3× Platinum	90,000^{‡}
Poland (ZPAV)	Platinum	20,000^{‡}
Portugal (AFP)	Platinum	10,000^{‡}
Spain (Promusicae)	Platinum	60,000^{‡}
Switzerland (IFPI Switzerland)	Gold	10,000^{‡}
United Kingdom (BPI)	2× Platinum	1,200,000^{‡}
United States (RIAA)	4× Platinum	4,000,000^{‡}
Streaming
Sweden (GLF)	2× Platinum	16,000,000^{†}
^{‡} Sales+streaming figures based on certification alone.^{†} Streaming-only figures based on certification alone.

== Release history ==
Region	Date	Format	Label	Ref.
Various	17 October 2019	Digital download; streaming	Arista	
Australia	24 April 2020	Contemporary hit radio	Arista; SME	
