= Inner Monologue Part 2 =

EP by Julia Michaels
- Released: June 28, 2019
- Recorded: 2018–2019
- Genre: Pop
- Length: 25:13
- Label: Republic
- Producer: Louis Bell; Scott Harris; Ian Kirkpatrick; Doc McKinney; Benjamin Miller; Jorgen Odegard; Mike Sonier

Julia Michaels chronology
| Inner Monologue Part 1 (2019) | Inner Monologue Part 2 (2019) | Not in Chronological Order (2021) |

Singles from Inner Monologue Part 2
- 1. "Hurt Again" Released: June 28, 2019

Inner Monologue Part 2 is the fifth extended play by American singer and songwriter Julia Michaels, released on June 28, 2019, through Republic Records. The EP features eight songs, including a collaboration with singer and songwriter Role Model. It is the follow-up to her previous extended play released earlier the same year, titled Inner Monologue Part 1.

== Background and release ==
On June 6, 2019, Michaels announced the release date of the EP. She released the EP on June 28, 2019. It serves as a follow-up to her EP Inner Monologue Part 1, released in January 2019. Michaels views both parts as one cohesive and connected album. Originally Michaels intended for Inner Monologue Part 1 to be full of love songs and for Inner Monologue Part 2 to be full of break-up songs, to distinct where she was from where she is now.

== Promotion ==
The EP was promoted with VEVO live performance videos for "Falling for Boys" and "Hurt Again" on July 10, as well as the release of the music videos for "Body" on August 7, "17" on August 27 and "Priest" on September 4.

== Artwork ==
The artwork was revealed along with the EP's release date on June 7, 2019.

== Track listing ==
Credits adapted from Tidal.

| No. | Title | Writer(s) | Producer(s) | Length |
|---|---|---|---|---|
| 1. | "17" | Julia Michaels | Louis Bell; Jesse Shatkin^{[c]} | 3:03 |
| 2. | "Falling for Boys" | Michaels | Benjamin Miller | 3:04 |
| 3. | "Hurt Again" | Michaels; Caroline Furoyen | Ian Kirkpatrick | 3:22 |
| 4. | "Work Too Much" | Michaels | Miller | 3:17 |
| 5. | "Body" | Michaels | Bell; Shatkin^{[c]} | 3:00 |
| 6. | "Priest" | Michaels; Justin Tranter | Doc McKinney; Mike Sonier | 3:14 |
| 7. | "Fucked Up, Kinda" (featuring Role Model) | Michaels; Scott Friedman | Miller | 2:34 |
| 8. | "Shouldn't Have Said It" | Michaels; Tranter | Jorgen Odegard | 3:39 |
| Total length: | | | | 25:13 |

Note

- ^{^[c]} signifies a co-producer.

== Personnel ==
Musicians

- Julia Michaels – vocals (all tracks), ukulele (track 2)
- Jesse Shatkin – bass guitar, drums, percussion, programming, synthesizer (tracks 1, 5); additional vocals, drum programming (1), strings (5)
- Simon Katz – additional vocals (track 1)
- Samuel Dent – string arrangement (tracks 1, 5)
- Benjamin Miller – background vocals, keyboards, strings, synthesizer (tracls 2, 4, 7); drums, percussion (4)
- Ian Kirkpatrick – programming (track 3)
- Mike Sonier – guitar (track 6)
- Role Model – background vocals (track 7)
- Jorgen Odegard – programming (track 8)

Technical

- Serban Ghenea – mixing (track 1)
- Mark "Spike" Stent – mixing (tracks 2–7)
- Jesse Shatkin – engineering (tracks 1, 5)
- Louis Bell – engineering (tracks 1, 5)
- Benjamin Miller – engineering (track 2)
- Benjamin Rice – engineering (track 2)
- Ian Kirkpatrick – engineering (track 3)
- Ray Charles Brown Jr. – engineering (track 8)
- Samuel Dent – engineering assistance (tracks 1, 5)

== Charts ==
| Chart (2019) | Peak position |
|---|---|
| Australian Albums (ARIA) | 91 |
| Dutch Albums (Album Top 100) | 55 |
| Norwegian Albums (VG-lista) | 14 |

== Release history ==
| Region | Date | Format | Label |
|---|---|---|---|
| Various | June 28, 2019 | Digital download, streaming | Republic |
