= Love Me Land =

Single by Zara Larsson

from the album Poster Girl
- Released: 10 July 2020
- Genre: Dance-pop
- Length: 2:40
- Label: TEN; Epic; Sony UK
- Songwriters: Zara Larsson; Julia Michaels; Justin Tranter; Jason Gill
- Producer: Jason Gill

Zara Larsson singles chronology
"Like It Is" (2020)	"Love Me Land" (2020)	"Wow" (2020)

Music video
- "Love Me Land" on YouTube

"Love Me Land" is a song by Swedish singer and songwriter Zara Larsson. It was released through TEN Music Group and Epic Records on 10 July 2020 as the second single from Larsson's third studio album Poster Girl (2021). It was co-written by Larsson with Julia Michaels, Justin Tranter and Jason Gill, the latter also producing the song. It has been described as a "a pulsating, attitude-filled dance-pop track."

== Music video ==
Larsson explained to Teen Vogue that the video was filmed in Sweden, where she had been staying during the pandemic. "A difference from usual video filming is that we had the director on a link from Finland because she was not able to travel," she explains. The video contains Zara dancing with various light effects, with a mixture of portrait-style performance shots and frenetic movement.

== Track listing ==
Digital download
No.	Title	Writer(s)	Producer(s)	Length
1.	"Love Me Land"	Zara Larsson; Julia Michaels; Justin Tranter; Jason Gill	Gill	2:40

Digital download (Secondcity Remix)
No.	Title	Length
1.	"Love Me Land" (Secondcity Remix)	3:47

== Charts ==
=== Weekly charts ===
2020 Weekly chart performance for "Love Me Land"
Chart (2020)	Peak position
Czech Republic Airplay (ČNS IFPI)	58
New Zealand Hot Singles (RMNZ)	11
Scottish Singles Sales (Official Charts)	67
Sweden (Sverigetopplistan)	8
UK Singles Downloads (Official Charts)	45

2023 Weekly chart performance for "Love Me Land"
Chart (2023)	Peak position
Moldova Airplay (TopHit)	102

2024 Weekly chart performance for "Love Me Land"
Chart (2024)	Peak position
Moldova Airplay (TopHit)	24

=== Monthly charts ===
2020 Monthly chart performance for "Love Me Land"
Chart (2020)	Peak position
Czech Republic (Rádio Top 100)	77

2024 Monthly chart performance for "Love Me Land"
Chart (2024)	Peak position
Moldova Airplay (TopHit)	26

== Certifications ==
Certifications for "Love Me Land"
Region	Certification	Certified units/sales
Norway (IFPI Norway)	Gold	30,000^{‡}
Streaming
Sweden (GLF)	Platinum	8,000,000^{†}
^{‡} Sales+streaming figures based on certification alone.^{†} Streaming-only figures based on certification alone.

== Release history ==
Release dates and format(s) for "Love Me Land"
Region	Date	Format	Version	Label	Ref.
Various	10 July 2020	Digital download; streaming	Original	TEN; Epic	
United Kingdom	10 July 2020	Contemporary hit radio	Original	TEN; Epic	
Russia	15 July 2020	Contemporary hit radio	Radio edit	TEN; Epic	
United States	21 July 2020	Contemporary hit radio	Original	Epic	
Various	7 August 2020	Digital download; streaming	Secondcity remix	TEN; Epic	
