= JP Saxe =

Canadian musician

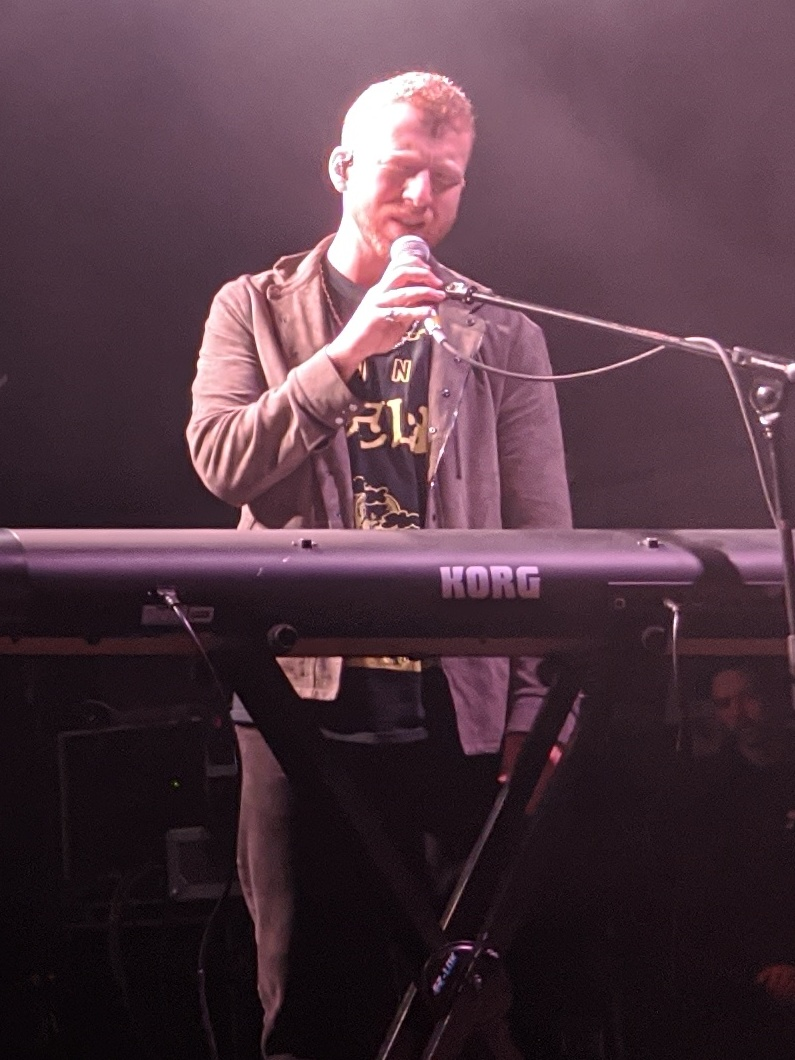
- Saxe in 2020

Background information
- Born: Jonathan Percy Starker Saxe; March 23, 1993 (age 33)
- Origin: Toronto, Ontario, Canada
- Genre: Pop
- Occupations: Singer; musician; songwriter
- Years active: 2012–present
- Label: Arista
- Website: jpsaxe.com

Jonathan Percy Starker Saxe (born March 23, 1993) is a Canadian singer. The grandson of musician János Starker, he is best known for his 2019 single "If the World Was Ending" (featuring Julia Michaels), which peaked within the top 30 of both the Canadian Hot 100 and Billboard Hot 100.

== Career ==
=== 2017–2018: Both Can Be True: Part 1 ===
Between April 2017 and March 2018, Saxe released the singles, "Changed", "Anybody Else" and "The Few Things". In November 2018, he released "25 in Barcelona" as the lead single from his debut EP. He released his debut EP, Both Can Be True: Part 1, on November 8, 2018.

=== 2019–2021: Hold It Together and Dangerous Levels of Introspection ===
Saxe released the singles "Same Room" and "Women Who Look Like You" between June and August 2019. He released "If the World Was Ending" featuring Julia Michaels as the lead single from his second EP. He released "Sad Corny Fuck" as the second single from his second EP, in February 2020. He released his second EP, Hold It Together, on February 7, 2020. It peaked at number 53 on the Canadian Albums Chart. He features on Lennon Stella's single "Golf on TV".

In April 2020, Saxe and Michaels re-released "If the World Was Ending" with other artists including Sam Smith, H.E.R., Alessia Cara, Sabrina Carpenter, Niall Horan, Keith Urban and Finneas O'Connell, who produced the song. Each artist filmed their part on their phones from their homes while self-isolating and features on the music video. Saxe explained that the collaboration was inspired by covers of the song he saw online, and he then texted the featured artists to ask if they'd want to get involved. All proceeds benefit Doctors Without Borders, where one of Saxe's friends worked, and the video ends with a special message from a participating doctor about the impact of COVID-19 on countries where many of the doctors are stationed. In a statement, Saxe and Michaels said, "We are so grateful for the incredible work being done by those on the frontlines during this global pandemic. At a time when it can sometimes feel like 'the world is ending', we thank all of the healthcare workers, first responders, and essential workers who are helping so many people in need. Please stay home, stay safe (and don't actually go over!)"

His song "Same Room" was shortlisted for the 2020 SOCAN Songwriting Prize.

He released his debut studio album Dangerous Levels of Introspection on June 25, 2021.

=== 2022–present: A Grey Area ===
In 2023, Saxe participated in an all-star recording of Serena Ryder's single "What I Wouldn't Do", which was released as a charity single to benefit Kids Help Phone's Feel Out Loud campaign for youth mental health.

In April 2023, he released "I Don't Miss You", co-written with John Mayer.

On September 22, 2023, he released his sophomore studio album A Grey Area via Arista Records.

On October 27, 2025, Saxe sang the Canadian national anthem before game 3 of the World Series between the Toronto Blue Jays and the Los Angeles Dodgers at Dodger Stadium. His performance received criticism from social media users, including him changing the lyrics from "Our home and native land" to "Our home on native land".

== Discography ==
- Dangerous Levels of Introspection (2021)
- A Grey Area (2023)
- Okay Piano Guy (2026)
