= Kodaline discography =

- Studio albums: 5
- EPs: 4
- Live albums: 1
- Singles: 17
- Music videos: 22

The discography of Kodaline, a Dublin-based Irish alternative rock quartet. Originally known as 21 Demands, the band made chart history in March 2007, when their debut single "Give Me a Minute" topped the Irish Singles Chart, becoming the first independently released track to achieve the feat. In June 2013 Kodaline released their debut studio album In a Perfect World, peaking at number 1 on the Irish Albums Chart. "High Hopes" was released as the lead single from the album in March 2013, peaking at number one on the Irish Singles Chart. "Love Like This" was released as the second single from the album in May 2013, peaking at number eight on the Irish Singles Chart. Their second studio album Coming Up for Air reached number one on the Irish Albums Chart. Their third studio album Politics of Living reached the number one on the Irish Albums Chart. Their fourth studio album One Day at a Time reached number two on the Irish Albums Chart.

== Albums ==
=== Studio albums ===
List of studio albums, with selected chart positions and certifications shown
| Title | Details | Peak chart positions | | | | | | | | Sales | Certifications |
| Title | Details | IRE | AUS | BEL | FRA | NL | NZ | SWI | UK | Sales | Certifications |
|---|---|---|---|---|---|---|---|---|---|---|---|
| In a Perfect World | Release: 17 June 2013; Label: RCA/B-Unique; Format: CD, digital download | 1 | 24 | 44 | 162 | 8 | — | 8 | 3 | UK: 219,126; US: 42,000 | IRMA: 2× Platinum; BPI: Platinum; MC: Gold; IFPI SWI: Gold; RMNZ: Platinum |
| Coming Up for Air | Release: 9 February 2015; Label: RCA/B-Unique; Format: CD, digital download | 1 | 37 | 44 | — | 13 | 23 | 4 | 4 | | BPI: Gold |
| Politics of Living | Release: 28 September 2018; Label: Sony; Format: CD, digital download | 1 | — | 49 | — | 86 | — | 11 | 15 | | |
| One Day at a Time | Release: 12 June 2020; Label: AWAL, B-Unique; Format: Digital download | 2 | — | — | — | — | — | 9 | 33 | | |
| We Were Only Young | Release: 2 October 2026; Label: Concord; Format: Digital download | — | — | — | — | — | — | 69 | — | | |

=== Live albums ===
List of live albums, with selected chart positions shown
| Title | Details | Peak chart positions | |
| Title | Details | IRE | UK |
|---|---|---|---|
| Our Roots Run Deep | Released: 14 October 2022; Label: Fantasy; Formats: CD, LP, digital download, streaming | 2 | 42 |

== Extended plays ==
| Title | Details | Peak chart positions |
| Title | Details | AUS |
|---|---|---|
| The Kodaline – EP | Release: 7 September 2012; Label: RCA/B-Unique; Format: CD, digital download | — |
| The High Hopes EP | Release: 17 March 2013; Label: RCA/B-Unique; Format: CD, digital download | 23 |
| Love Like This | Release: 2 June 2013; Label: RCA/B-Unique; Format: CD, digital download | — |
| I Wouldn't Be | Release: 13 October 2017; Label: RCA/B-Unique; Format: Digital download | — |
"—" denotes Extended plays that did not chart or were not released.

== Singles ==
=== As lead artists ===
List of singles as lead artists, with selected chart positions and certifications shown
| Title | Year | Peak chart positions | | | | | | | | Certifications | Album |
| Title | Year | IRE | AUS | BEL | FRA | NL | SCO | SWI | UK | Certifications | Album |
|---|---|---|---|---|---|---|---|---|---|---|---|
| "High Hopes" | 2013 | 1 | 23 | 128 | — | 86 | 13 | 38 | 16 | BPI: Gold | In a Perfect World |
| "Love Like This" | 2013 | 8 | — | 144 | — | — | 19 | — | 22 | BPI: Silver | In a Perfect World |
| "Brand New Day" | 2013 | 29 | — | — | — | — | — | — | 75 | | In a Perfect World |
| "All I Want" | 2013 | 15 | — | 57 | 48 | 26 | — | — | 67 | BPI: Platinum; RIAA: Gold | In a Perfect World |
| "One Day" | 2014 | 19 | — | — | — | — | — | — | 136 | | In a Perfect World |
| "Honest" | 2014 | 7 | — | 56 | — | — | 19 | 61 | 39 | | Coming Up for Air |
| "The One" | 2015 | 22 | — | — | — | — | 11 | — | 27 | BPI: Gold | Coming Up for Air |
| "Ready" | 2015 | 64 | — | — | — | — | — | — | 187 | | Coming Up for Air |
| "Brother" | 2017 | 36 | — | — | — | — | 39 | 18 | — | BPI: Silver; IFPI SWI: Platinum | Politics of Living |
| "Ready to Change" | 2017 | — | — | — | — | — | — | — | — | | I Wouldn't Be |
| "Follow Your Fire" | 2018 | 20 | — | — | — | — | 64 | 82 | — | | Politics of Living |
| "Shed a Tear" | 2018 | — | — | — | — | — | — | — | — | | Politics of Living |
| "Worth It" | 2018 | — | — | — | — | — | — | — | — | | Politics of Living |
| "Head Held High" | 2018 | 68 | — | — | — | — | — | — | — | | Politics of Living |
| "Wherever You Are" | 2020 | 66 | — | — | — | — | 76 | — | — | | One Day at a Time |
| "Sometimes" | 2020 | 94 | — | — | — | — | 76 | — | — | | One Day at a Time |
| "This Must Be Christmas" | 2020 | — | — | — | — | — | — | — | — | | Non-album single |
| "We Were Only Young" | 2026 | — | — | — | — | — | — | — | — | | We Were Only Young |
| "Without You" | 2026 | — | — | — | — | — | — | — | — | | We Were Only Young |
| "Vultures" | 2026 | — | — | — | — | — | — | — | — | | We Were Only Young |
"—" denotes singles that did not chart or were not released.

=== As featured artists ===
List of singles as featured artists, with selected chart positions and certifications shown
| Title | Year | Peak chart positions | | | | | | Certifications | Album |
| Title | Year | IRE | BEL | FR | NL | SWI | UK | Certifications | Album |
|---|---|---|---|---|---|---|---|---|---|
| "Raging" (Kygo featuring Kodaline) | 2016 | 9 | 54 | 64 | 26 | 24 | 42 | BPI: Silver | Cloud Nine |

== Other charted songs ==
| Title | Year | Peak chart positions | Album |
| Title | Year | IRE | Album |
|---|---|---|---|
| "Love Will Set You Free" | 2015 | 66 | Coming Up for Air |
| "Hide and Seek" | 2018 | 100 | Politics of Living |

== Guest appearances ==
| Title | Year | Other artist(s) | Album |
|---|---|---|---|
| "Hold You" | 2014 | Nina Nesbitt | Peroxide |
| "All for Love" | 2018 | Sigala | Brighter Days |
