= List of number-one albums of 2018 (Ireland) =

The Irish Albums Chart ranks the best-performing albums in Ireland, as compiled by the Official Charts Company on behalf of the Irish Recorded Music Association.

Issue date	Album	Artist	Reference
5 January	÷	Ed Sheeran	
12 January	÷	Ed Sheeran	
19 January	Tales from the Backseat	The Academic	
26 January	The Greatest Showman: Original Motion Picture Soundtrack	Various artists	
2 February	The Greatest Showman: Original Motion Picture Soundtrack	Various artists	
9 February	The Greatest Showman: Original Motion Picture Soundtrack	Various artists	
16 February	The Greatest Showman: Original Motion Picture Soundtrack	Various artists	
23 February	The Greatest Showman: Original Motion Picture Soundtrack	Various artists	
2 March	The Greatest Showman: Original Motion Picture Soundtrack	Various artists	
9 March	The Greatest Showman: Original Motion Picture Soundtrack	Various artists	
16 March	The Greatest Showman: Original Motion Picture Soundtrack	Various artists	
23 March	The Greatest Showman: Original Motion Picture Soundtrack	Various artists	
30 March	The Greatest Showman: Original Motion Picture Soundtrack	Various artists	
6 April	The Greatest Showman: Original Motion Picture Soundtrack	Various artists	
13 April	The Greatest Showman: Original Motion Picture Soundtrack	Various artists	
20 April	The Greatest Showman: Original Motion Picture Soundtrack	Various artists	
27 April	KOD	J. Cole	
4 May	Beerbongs & Bentleys	Post Malone	
11 May	÷	Ed Sheeran	
18 May	÷	Ed Sheeran	
25 May	÷	Ed Sheeran	
1 June	Wildness	Snow Patrol	
8 June	Ye	Kanye West	
15 June	The Greatest Showman: Original Motion Picture Soundtrack	Various artists	
22 June	Reputation	Taylor Swift	
29 June	The Greatest Showman: Original Motion Picture Soundtrack	Various artists	
6 July	Scorpion	Drake	
13 July	Scorpion	Drake	
20 July	Scorpion	Drake	
27 July	Mamma Mia! Here We Go Again: The Movie Soundtrack	Various artists	
3 August	Mamma Mia! Here We Go Again: The Movie Soundtrack	Various artists	
10 August	Mamma Mia! Here We Go Again: The Movie Soundtrack	Various artists	
17 August	Mamma Mia! Here We Go Again: The Movie Soundtrack	Various artists	
24 August	Sweetener	Ariana Grande	
31 August	Sweetener	Ariana Grande	
7 September	Kamikaze	Eminem	
14 September	Kamikaze	Eminem	
21 September	Kamikaze	Eminem	
28 September	Kamikaze	Eminem	
5 October	Politics of Living	Kodaline	
12 October	A Star Is Born	Lady Gaga and Bradley Cooper	
19 October	A Star Is Born	Lady Gaga and Bradley Cooper	
26 October	A Star Is Born	Lady Gaga and Bradley Cooper	
2 November	A Star Is Born	Lady Gaga and Bradley Cooper	
9 November	A Star Is Born	Lady Gaga and Bradley Cooper	
16 November	A Star Is Born	Lady Gaga and Bradley Cooper	
23 November	A Star Is Born	Lady Gaga and Bradley Cooper	
30 November	A Star Is Born	Lady Gaga and Bradley Cooper	
7 December	The Greatest Showman: Original Motion Picture Soundtrack	Various artists	
14 December	A Star Is Born	Lady Gaga and Bradley Cooper	
21 December	A Star Is Born	Lady Gaga and Bradley Cooper	
28 December	A Star Is Born	Lady Gaga and Bradley Cooper	

== Number-one artists ==
Position	Artist	Weeks at No. 1
1	Lady Gaga	11
1	Bradley Cooper	11
3	Ed Sheeran	6
4	Eminem	4
5	Drake	3
6	Ariana Grande	2
7	The Academic	1
7	J. Cole	1
7	Post Malone	1
7	Snow Patrol	1
7	Kanye West	1
7	Taylor Swift	1
7	Kodaline	1

== See also ==
- List of number-one singles of 2018 (Ireland)
