= Brother (Kodaline song) =

Single by Kodaline

from the album Politics of Living
- Released: 23 June 2017
- Recorded: 2017
- Genre: Indie pop
- Length: 3:23
- Label: B-Unique
- Songwriters: Jason Boland; Vincent May; Corey Sanders; Jon Maguire; Mark Prendergast; Alex Davies; Stephen Garrigan
- Producers: Two Inch Punch; Stephen Harris

Kodaline singles chronology
"Raging" (2016)	"Brother" (2017)	"Ready to Change" (2017)

Music video
- "Brother" on YouTube

"Brother" is a song by Dublin-based alternative rock quartet Kodaline. It was written by Jason Boland, Vincent May, Corey Sanders, Jon Maguire, Mark Prendergast, Alex Davies and Stephen Garrigan, with the song's production handled by Two Inch Punch and Stephen Harris. It was released to digital retailers on 23 June 2017, as the lead single from the band's third studio album Politics of Living.

== Background ==
The band first teased the song's release through a tweet on 15 June 2017. A 15-second teaser was posted, along with the song's details, including its release date.

== Music video ==
The music video was released alongside the single, and was directed by Stevie Russell, who also produced the music videos for the band's previous singles "Honest", "High Hopes" and "All I Want".

"It was such a pleasure to work with Stevie again, every time we read one of his scripts they jump right off the page. We can't wait for everyone to see what he's done for 'Brother', he really captured the perfect vibe again," the band said in a statement.

Robin Murray of Clash magazine described the video as "a highly moving, touching, directly emotional affair, one that taps into the core of the song." Rob Copsey of Official Charts Company described it as "emotional".

== Critical reception ==
Robin Murray of Clash magazine wrote: "'Brother' has all those key Kodaline components - moving lyrics, and a soaring chorus." Rob Copsey of Official Charts Company called the production from Two Inch Punch and Stephen Harris a "nifty new production", and wrote that the song is "the rousing and emotional Kodaline you'll probably already be familiar with".

== Track listing ==
Digital download
No.	Title	Length
1.	"Brother"	3:21

Digital download – Stripped Back
No.	Title	Length
1.	"Brother" (Stripped Back)	3:18

== Credits and personnel ==
Credits adapted from Tidal.

- Jason Boland – composer, lyricist, bass guitarist, background vocalist
- Vincent May – composer, lyricist, background vocalist, drummer, percussionist
- Corey Sanders – composer, lyricist
- Jon Maguire – composer, lyricist, programmer
- Mark Prendergast – composer, lyricist, background vocalist, guitarist, pianist, strings player
- Alex Davies – composer, lyricist, strings player
- Stephen Garrigan – composer, lyricist, vocalist, background vocalist
- Two Inch Punch – producer
- Stephen Harris – producer, strings player
- Mark Stent – mixing engineer
- Stuart Hawkes – mastering engineer
- Ben Ash – keyboard engineer, programmer

== Charts ==
Chart (2017–18)	Peak position
Czech Republic Airplay (ČNS IFPI)	16
Ireland (IRMA)	36
Irish Homegrown Top 20 (IRMA)	8
Scotland Singles (OCC)	39
Switzerland (Schweizer Hitparade)	18

== Certifications ==
Region	Certification	Certified units/sales
Denmark (IFPI Danmark)	Gold	45,000^{‡}
New Zealand (RMNZ)	Platinum	30,000^{‡}
Poland (ZPAV)	Gold	25,000^{‡}
Switzerland (IFPI Switzerland)	Platinum	20,000^{‡}
United Kingdom (BPI)	Gold	400,000^{‡}
^{‡} Sales+streaming figures based on certification alone.
