= Feel Good =

Feel Good may refer to:

== Music ==
=== Albums ===
- Feel Good (Ike & Tina Turner album), 1972
- Feel Good (Abigail album), 1994
- Feel Good (Che'Nelle album), 2010
- Feel Good (The Internet album), 2013
- Feel Good (Bini album), 2022

=== Songs ===
- "Feel Good" (Phats & Small song), 1999
- "Feel Good" (G-Unit song), 2008
- "Feel Good" (Modestep song), 2011
- "Feel Good" (Robin Thicke song), 2013
- "Feel Good" (Syn Cole song), 2016
- "Feel Good" (Gryffin and Illenium song), 2017
- "Feel Good (It's Alright)", 2015 song by Blonde
- "Feelgood" (song), 2008 song by Ola Svensson
- "Feel Good", a 2000 song by Madasun
- "Feel Good", a 2009 song by Nolwenn Leroy on her album Le Cheshire Cat et moi
- "Feel Good", a 2017 song by Felix Jaehn and Mike Williams from I (Felix Jaehn album)
- "Feel Good", a 2022 song by Bo Burnham from The Inside Outtakes
- "Feel Good", a 2023 song by Slowthai from Ugly
- "Feel Good", a 2023 song by Charlotte Cardin
- "Feel Good (Secret Code)", a 2020 song by Fromis 9 from My Little Society

== Other ==
- Feel Good (TV series), a British television series
- "Feel Good", a storyline in the science fiction comedy webtoon series Live with Yourself!

== See also ==
- "Feel Good Inc.", a 2005 song by Gorillaz
- Mr Feelgood, a racehorse
- Dr. Feelgood (disambiguation)
- I Feel Good (disambiguation)
- Feeling Good (disambiguation)
- Feels Good (disambiguation)
- Feels So Good (disambiguation)
