= List of best-selling singles and albums of 2013 in Ireland =

This is a list of the best selling singles, albums and as according to IRMA. Further listings can be found here.

== Top-selling singles ==
1. Robin Thicke – "Blurred Lines"
2. Passenger – "Let Her Go"
3. Avicii – "Wake Me Up"
4. Daft Punk – "Get Lucky"
5. Pink – "Just Give Me a Reason"
6. Bastile – "Pompeill"
7. Macklemore & Ryan Lewis – "Thrift Shop"
8. The Lumineers – "Ho Hey"
9. Katy Perry – "Roar"
10. Macklemore & Ryan Lewis – "Can't Hold Us"

== Top-selling albums ==
1. Midnight Memories – One Direction
2. Our Version of Events – Emeli Sandé
3. In a Perfect World – Kodaline
4. To Be Loved – Michael Bublé
5. The Marshall Mathers LP 2 – Eminem
6. Take Me Home – One Direction
7. Unorthodox Jukebox – Bruno Mars
8. Random Access Memories – Daft Punk
9. The Truth About Love – Pink
10. Up All Night – One Direction

Notes:

- *Compilation albums are not included.
