= I Feel Good (disambiguation) =

I Feel Good most commonly refers to the song "I Got You (I Feel Good)" by James Brown.

It may also refer to:

- I Feel Good!, a 1970 album by John Lee Hooker
- I Feel Good (album), 2015 album by Daniel Padilla
- I Feel Good (film), 2018 film
- "I Feel Good", 2021 song by Pitbull
- "I Feel Good", 2012 song by EXID, from Hippity Hop
- "I Feel Good", 2015 song by Lil Wayne, from Free Weezy Album
- "I Feel Good", a 2009 television episode from ER (season 15)
- "I Feel Good", 2022 song by BINI

== See also ==
- Feel Good (disambiguation)
- Feeling Good (disambiguation)
