= Feels Good (disambiguation) =

"Feels Good" is a 1990 song by Tony! Toni! Toné!

Feels Good may also refer to:

- Feels Good (album), by Take 6, 2006
- "Feels Good (Don't Worry Bout a Thing)", by Naughty by Nature, 2002
- "Feels Good", a song by Rahsaan Patterson from the 2007 album Wines & Spirits

== See also ==
- Feel Good (disambiguation)
- "Feel So Good", a 1997 song by Mase
- Feels So Good (disambiguation)
