= List of number-one singles of 2007 (Ireland) =

This is a list of the Irish Recorded Music Association's Irish Singles Chart Top 50 number-ones of 2007.

Issue date	Song	Artist	ref
4 January	"A Moment Like This"	Leona Lewis	
11 January	"A Moment Like This"	Leona Lewis	
18 January	"A Moment Like This"	Leona Lewis	
25 January	"A Moment Like This"	Leona Lewis	
1 February	"Grace Kelly"	Mika	
8 February	"Grace Kelly"	Mika	
15 February	"Grace Kelly"	Mika	
22 February	"Grace Kelly"	Mika	
1 March	"Grace Kelly"	Mika	
8 March	"Grace Kelly"	Mika	
15 March	"Grace Kelly"	Mika	
22 March	"Give Me a Minute"	21 Demands	
29 March	"How to Save a Life"	The Fray	
5 April	"Girlfriend"	Avril Lavigne	
12 April	"Girlfriend"	Avril Lavigne	
19 April	"Beautiful Liar"	Beyoncé and Shakira	
26 April	"Like Only a Woman Can"	Brian McFadden	
3 May	"Beautiful Liar"	Beyoncé and Shakira	
10 May	"Girlfriend"	Avril Lavigne	
17 May	"Don't Matter"	Akon	
24 May	"Umbrella"	Rihanna featuring Jay-Z	
31 May	"Umbrella"	Rihanna featuring Jay-Z	
7 June	"Umbrella"	Rihanna featuring Jay-Z	
14 June	"Umbrella"	Rihanna featuring Jay-Z	
21 June	"Umbrella"	Rihanna featuring Jay-Z	
28 June	"Umbrella"	Rihanna featuring Jay-Z	
5 July	"Umbrella"	Rihanna featuring Jay-Z	
12 July	"Umbrella"	Rihanna featuring Jay-Z	
19 July	"Big Girls Don't Cry"	Fergie	
26 July	"The Way I Are"	Timbaland featuring Keri Hilson and D.O.E.	
2 August	"The Way I Are"	Timbaland featuring Keri Hilson and D.O.E.	
9 August	"The Way I Are"	Timbaland featuring Keri Hilson and D.O.E.	
16 August	"The Way I Are"	Timbaland featuring Keri Hilson and D.O.E.	
23 August	"The Way I Are"	Timbaland featuring Keri Hilson and D.O.E.	
30 August	"Beautiful Girls"	Sean Kingston	
6 September	"Beautiful Girls"	Sean Kingston	
13 September	"Beautiful Girls"	Sean Kingston	
20 September	"Beautiful Girls"	Sean Kingston	
27 September	"If That's OK with You"	Shayne Ward	
4 October	"If That's OK with You"	Shayne Ward	
11 October	"If That's OK with You"	Shayne Ward	
18 October	"If That's OK with You"	Shayne Ward	
25 October	"Bleeding Love"	Leona Lewis	
1 November	"Bleeding Love"	Leona Lewis	
8 November	"Bleeding Love"	Leona Lewis	
15 November	"Bleeding Love"	Leona Lewis	
22 November	"Bleeding Love"	Leona Lewis	
29 November	"Bleeding Love"	Leona Lewis	
6 December	"Bleeding Love"	Leona Lewis	
13 December	"Bleeding Love"	Leona Lewis	
20 December	"When You Believe"	Leon Jackson	
27 December	"When You Believe"	Leon Jackson	

== See also ==
- 2007 in music
- List of artists who reached number one in Ireland
- Irish Singles Chart
