= The One (Kodaline song) =

Single by Kodaline

from the album Coming Up for Air
- Released: 12 April 2015
- Recorded: 2014
- Genre: Indie rock, alternative rock
- Length: 3:52
- Label: B-Unique
- Songwriters: Steve Garrigan; Mark Prendergrast; Vincent May; Jacknife Lee
- Producer: Jacknife Lee

Kodaline singles chronology
"Honest" (2015)	"The One" (2015)	"Ready" (2015)

"The One" is a song by Irish alternative rock quartet Kodaline. The song was released on 12 April 2015 as the second single from the band's second studio album, Coming Up for Air (2015).

== Track listing ==
Digital download
No.	Title	Length
1.	"The One"	3:52

== Charts ==
Chart (2015)	Peak position
Ireland (IRMA)	22
Scotland Singles (OCC)	11
UK Singles (OCC)	27

== Certifications ==
Region	Certification	Certified units/sales
United Kingdom (BPI)	Gold	400,000^{‡}
^{‡} Sales+streaming figures based on certification alone.

== Release history ==
Region	Date	Format
United Kingdom	6 February 2015	Digital download
