= Cloud Nine (Kygo album) =

Studio album by Kygo
- Released: 13 May 2016
- Recorded: 2014–2016
- Genres: Tropical house; progressive house; deep house; downtempo; EDM
- Length: 55:49
- Labels: Sony; Ultra
- Producers: Kygo; Mark Ralph; William Wiik Larsen; Labrinth

Kygo chronology
Cloud Nine (2016)	Stargazing (2017)

Singles from Cloud Nine
- 1. "Firestone" Released: 1 December 2014; 2. "Stole the Show" Released: 23 March 2015; 3. "Nothing Left" Released: 31 July 2015; 4. "Stay" Released: 4 December 2015; 5. "Raging" Released: 1 April 2016; 6. "Carry Me" Released: 12 August 2016

Cloud Nine is the debut studio album by Norwegian DJ and record producer Kygo and features the likes of Maty Noyes, Conrad Sewell, Parson James, Tom Odell, Foxes, Matt Corby, Rhodes, Will Heard, Julia Michaels, James Vincent McMorrow, Kodaline, Labrinth, John Legend and Angus & Julia Stone. It was released on 13 May 2016 by Sony Music and Ultra Music.

== Singles ==
The album's first single, "Firestone" featuring Australian singer Conrad Sewell, was released on 1 December 2014. The debut single was an international success charting in over 14 countries and peaked at number one on the Norwegian Singles Chart. "Firestone" notably popularized the genre of tropical house in 2014. In late 2015, it was confirmed to be the lead single from the album.

The second single, "Stole the Show" featuring Parson James was released on 23 March 2015. It peaked at number one on Norwegian, French, and Swedish charts and reached the top 10 in more than 20 countries.

"Nothing Left" featuring Will Heard was released as the third single on 31 July 2015. The single charted on several international charts and peaked at number one on the Norwegian Singles Chart.

"Stay" featuring Maty Noyes was released as the fourth single on 4 December 2015. The single peaked at number two on the Norwegian Singles Chart.

"Raging" featuring Kodaline is the fifth single from the album. On 1 April 2016, it was also released as the second promotional single from the album.

"Carry Me" featuring Julia Michaels is the sixth single from the album, released on 12 August 2016.

=== Promotional singles ===
After the delayed release of his album, Kygo announced that he would release three promotional singles leading to the release of the album. The first promotional single, "Fragile" was released on 18 March 2016. It is a collaboration with Labrinth.

The third promotional single, "I'm in Love" featuring vocals from James Vincent McMorrow, was released on 22 April 2016. Its music video was released on 20 May 2016 and served as the follow-up to "Raging".

== Promotion ==
Cloud Nine was supported by Kygo's first world tour. The tour landed in 22 cities across North America and Europe, including stops at Barclays in New York City, Heineken Music Hall in Amsterdam and Le Zenith in Paris.

== Critical reception ==
Professional ratings
Aggregate scores
Source	Rating
Metacritic	57/100
Review scores
Source	Rating
AllMusic	3.5/5 stars
The Arts Desk	1/5 stars
Gaffa (Denmark)	5/6 stars
Gaffa (Norway)	4/6 stars
London Evening Standard	2/5 stars
NME	3/5
Rolling Stone	3/5 stars
The Guardian	1/5 stars
The Line of Best Fit	5/10
Q	6/10

Cloud Nine received mixed reviews from music critics. David Smith from the London Evening Standard gave the album two out of five stars, stating that Cloud Nine is "superficially pretty with little of real substance."

== Track listing ==
Cloud Nine track listing
No.	Title	Writer(s)	Producer(s)	Length
1.	"Intro"	Kyrre Gørvell-Dahll	Kygo	2:08
2.	"Stole the Show" (featuring Parson James)	Gørvell-Dahll; Kyle Kelso; Michael Harwood; Marli Harwood; Ashton Parson	Kygo	3:42
3.	"Fiction" (featuring Tom Odell)	Gørvell-Dahll; Thomas Peter Odell; Björn Yttling	Kygo; Mark Ralph	4:03
4.	"Raging" (featuring Kodaline)	Gørvell-Dahll; Mark Williams; Derek Fuhrmann; James Bay	Kygo	3:44
5.	"Firestone" (featuring Conrad Sewell)	Gørvell-Dahll; Sewell; Martijn Konignenburg	Kygo	4:33
6.	"Happy Birthday" (featuring John Legend)	Gørvell-Dahll; John Roger Stephens	Kygo	4:10
7.	"I'm in Love" (featuring James Vincent McMorrow)	Gørvell-Dahll; McMorrow	Kygo	3:32
8.	"Oasis" (featuring Foxes)	Gørvell-Dahll; Louisa Rose Allen; Kevin Rudolf; Sia Furler; Ivan Corraliza	Kygo	3:57
9.	"Not Alone" (featuring Rhodes)	Gørvell-Dahll; David Rhodes; Natalie Salter	Kygo	3:25
10.	"Serious" (featuring Matt Corby)	Gørvell-Dahll; Matthew John Corby	Kygo	3:54
11.	"Stay" (featuring Maty Noyes)	Gørvell-Dahll; Madeline Ashley Noyes; William Wiik Larsen	Kygo; Larsen	3:59
12.	"Nothing Left" (featuring Will Heard)	Gørvell-Dahll; Heard	Kygo	3:56
13.	"Fragile" (with Labrinth)	Gørvell-Dahll; Jimmy Messer; Timothy McKenzie	Kygo; Labrinth	3:50
14.	"Carry Me" (featuring Julia Michaels)	Gørvell-Dahll; Michaels; Justin Tranter	Kygo	3:53
15.	"For What It's Worth" (featuring Angus & Julia Stone)	Gørvell-Dahll; A. Stone; J. Stone	Kygo	3:03
Total length:				55:49

Japanese edition bonus tracks
No.	Title	Length
16.	"Here for You" (featuring Ella Henderson)	4:04
17.	"Cut Your Teeth" (Kygo remix; with Kyla La Grange)	6:35
Total length:		66:28

== Charts ==
=== Weekly charts ===
Chart (2016)	Peak position
Australian Albums (ARIA)	13
Austrian Albums (Ö3 Austria)	16
Belgian Albums (Ultratop Flanders)	9
Belgian Albums (Ultratop Wallonia)	22
Canadian Albums (Billboard)	3
Czech Albums (ČNS IFPI)	1
Danish Albums (Hitlisten)	9
Dutch Albums (Album Top 100)	4
Finnish Albums (Suomen virallinen lista)	5
French Albums (SNEP)	10
German Albums (Offizielle Top 100)	6
Hungarian Albums (MAHASZ)	31
Irish Albums (IRMA)	7
Italian Albums (FIMI)	13
Japanese Albums (Oricon)	32
Japan Hot Albums (Billboard Japan)	25
South Korean International Albums (Circle)	23
New Zealand Albums (RMNZ)	14
Norwegian Albums (VG-lista)	1
Polish Albums (ZPAV)	34
Portuguese Albums (AFP)	17
Scottish Albums (Official Charts)	2
Spanish Albums (Promusicae)	22
Swedish Albums (Sverigetopplistan)	2
Swiss Albums (Schweizer Hitparade)	1
UK Albums (Official Charts)	3
UK Dance Albums (Official Charts)	1
US Billboard 200	11
US Top Dance Albums (Billboard)	1

Chart (2024)	Peak position
Greek Albums (IFPI)	73

=== Year-end charts ===
Chart (2016)	Position
Australian Dance Albums (ARIA)	23
Belgian Albums (Ultratop Flanders)	117
Danish Albums (Hitlisten)	76
Dutch Albums (MegaCharts)	43
French Albums (SNEP)	148
Swedish Albums (Sverigetopplistan)	22
Swiss Albums (Schweizer Hitparade)	75
US Top Dance/Electronic Albums (Billboard)	6
Chart (2017)	Position
Australian Dance Albums (ARIA)	47
Dutch Albums (MegaCharts)	97
Slovak Albums (ČNS IFPI)	18
Swedish Albums (Sverigetopplistan)	34
US Top Dance/Electronic Albums (Billboard)	11
Chart (2018)	Position
Swedish Albums (Sverigetopplistan)	76

== Certifications ==
Region	Certification	Certified units/sales
Canada (Music Canada)	Platinum	80,000^{‡}
Denmark (IFPI Danmark)	Platinum	20,000^{‡}
France (SNEP)	Platinum	100,000^{‡}
Italy (FIMI)	Gold	25,000^{‡}
Mexico (AMPROFON)	3× Platinum+Gold	210,000^{‡}
Netherlands (NVPI)	2× Platinum	80,000^{‡}
New Zealand (RMNZ)	2× Platinum	30,000^{‡}
Norway (IFPI Norway)	9× Platinum	180,000^{‡}
Poland (ZPAV)	Platinum	20,000^{‡}
Sweden (GLF)	Platinum	40,000^{‡}
Switzerland (IFPI Switzerland)	2× Platinum	40,000^{‡}
United Kingdom (BPI)	Gold	100,000^{‡}
United States (RIAA)	Gold	500,000^{‡}
^{‡} Sales+streaming figures based on certification alone.

== Release history ==
Region	Date	Format	Label
Worldwide	13 May 2016	Digital download; CD	Sony; Ultra
Japan	29 June 2016	Digital download; CD	Sony; Ultra
