= Good Feeling =

Good Feeling may refer to:

== Albums ==
- Good Feeling (Paul Carrack album), 2012
- Good Feeling (Travis album) or the title song, 1997
- The Good Feeling, by the Christian McBride Big Band, 2011
- Good Feeling (EP), by Flo Rida, or the title song (see below), 2012

== Songs ==
- "Good Feeling" (song), by Flo Rida, 2011
- "Good Feeling", by Andy Gibb, 1981
- "Good Feeling", by Reef from Replenish, 1995
- "Good Feeling", by Soledad Brothers, 2006
- "Good Feeling", by Violent Femmes from Violent Femmes, 1983

== See also ==
- That Good Feelin', an album by Johnny "Hammond" Smith, 1959
- "Good Feelings", a song by Coldplay and Ayra Starr from Moon Music, 2024
- Era of Good Feelings, an early-19th century period of American history
- Good Feelin', an album by T-Bone Walker
- Feeling Good (disambiguation)
