= Stay (Kygo song) =

2015 single by Kygo

Single by Kygo featuring Maty Noyes

from the album Cloud Nine
- Released: 4 December 2015
- Recorded: 2015
- Genre: Tropical house
- Length: 3:59 (album version); 3:10 (radio edit)
- Label: Sony
- Songwriters: Kygo; Maty Noyes; William Wiik Larsen
- Producers: Kygo; William Wiik Larsen

Kygo singles chronology
"Here for You" (2015)	"Stay" (2015)	"Raging" (2016)

Maty Noyes singles chronology
"Haunted" (2015)	"Stay" (2015)	"In My Mind" (2016)

Music video
- "Stay" on YouTube

"Stay" is a song by Norwegian DJ and record producer Kygo, featuring American singer Maty Noyes. The song was produced by Kygo with fellow Norwegian, William Wiik Larsen, who also wrote it with Noyes. It was released as the fourth single from Kygo's debut studio album, Cloud Nine (2016). An official music video for the song was released on 18 February 2016.

== Background ==
After writing what would eventually become "Stay", Noyes discovered Kygo through a remix he did of Marvin Gaye's 1982 single "Sexual Healing". Noyes liked Kygo's remix and "figured he could do something with this song", so she talked to her manager, Phoenix Stone, about the possibility of working with Kygo. Stone mentioned that an A&R executive had heard "Angel"—a track Noyes did with The Weeknd for the latter's debut album Beauty Behind the Madness (2015)—and was now looking for another song for Kygo to work on. According to Noyes, "We sent [the demo] to them and one of his people in his team was playing it for him in his hotel room and he said, automatically, "Send me this I want to do it right now." It worked out really quickly. He had it done within a few days and he said it was one of the fastest songs he ever finished. It was meant to be."

== Live performances ==
Kygo and Noyes gave their first live performance of the song at the Nobel Peace Prize Concert on December 11, 2015.

In October 2016, Noyes missed a live gig through illness and Kygo's manager, Myles Shear, banned her from performing at the Hollywood Bowl with him as a result. He later apologised.

== Music video ==
The music video was directed by Jason Beattie. It follows the topsy-turvy relationship of a lesbian couple.

== Charts ==
=== Weekly charts ===
Chart (2015–2016)	Peak position
Australia (ARIA)	67
Austria (Ö3 Austria Top 40)	30
Belgium (Ultratop 50 Flanders)	24
Belgium (Ultratop 50 Wallonia)	2
Canada Hot 100 (Billboard)	59
Canada CHR/Top 40 (Billboard)	43
Denmark (Tracklisten)	14
Finland (Suomen virallinen lista)	14
France (SNEP)	72
Germany (GfK)	38
Hungary (Rádiós Top 40)	1
Hungary (Single Top 40)	39
Hungary (Stream Top 40)	8
Ireland (IRMA)	13
Italy (FIMI)	27
Japan Hot 100 (Billboard)	21
Japan Hot Overseas (Billboard)	1
Netherlands (Dutch Top 40)	9
Netherlands (Single Top 100)	10
New Zealand (Recorded Music NZ)	38
Norway (VG-lista)	2
Poland Dance (ZPAV)	46
Portugal (AFP)	14
Scottish Singles Sales (Official Charts)	37
Sweden (Sverigetopplistan)	3
Switzerland (Schweizer Hitparade)	11
UK Singles (Official Charts)	20
UK Dance (Official Charts)	7
US Bubbling Under Hot 100 (Billboard)	6
US Hot Dance/Electronic Songs (Billboard)	8

=== Year-end charts ===
Chart (2016)	Position
Belgium (Ultratop Flanders)	74
Belgium (Ultratop Wallonia)	12
Denmark (Tracklisten)	58
France (SNEP)	105
Hungary (Rádiós Top 40)	23
Italy (FIMI)	68
Netherlands (Dutch Top 40)	36
Netherlands (Single Top 100)	39
Sweden (Sverigetopplistan)	38
Switzerland (Schweizer Hitparade)	49
UK Singles (Official Charts Company)	80
US Hot Dance/Electronic Songs (Billboard)	23

== Certifications ==
Region	Certification	Certified units/sales
Australia (ARIA)	Platinum	70,000^{‡}
Belgium (BRMA)	Platinum	20,000^{‡}
Canada (Music Canada)	2× Platinum	160,000^{‡}
Denmark (IFPI Danmark)	Platinum	90,000^{‡}
Germany (BVMI)	Gold	200,000^{‡}
Italy (FIMI)	2× Platinum	100,000^{‡}
Mexico (AMPROFON)	2× Platinum	120,000^{‡}
New Zealand (RMNZ)	Platinum	15,000^{*}
Poland (ZPAV)	Platinum	20,000^{‡}
Spain (Promusicae)	Gold	20,000^{‡}
Sweden (GLF)	4× Platinum	160,000^{‡}
Switzerland (IFPI Switzerland)	Platinum	30,000^{‡}
United Kingdom (BPI)	Platinum	600,000^{‡}
United States (RIAA)	Gold	500,000^{‡}
^{*} Sales figures based on certification alone.^{‡} Sales+streaming figures based on certification alone.

== Release history ==
Region	Date	Format	Label
Worldwide	4 December 2015	Digital download	Sony
