= Syn Cole =

Estonian DJ (born 1988)

- Born: Rene Pais; 25 March 1988 (age 38); Pärnu, then part of Estonian SSR, Soviet Union
- Genres: Electro house; progressive house; future house; EDM; tropical house
- Occupations: DJ; record producer
- Instruments: Synthesizer; piano; guitar; drums
- Years active: 2012–present
- Labels: PRMD; NoCopyrightSounds; Spinnin'; STMPD; Columbia; Sony; Universal; Epic
- Website: syncole.com

Rene Pais (born 25 March 1988), better known by his stage name Syn Cole, is an Estonian DJ and record producer. Some of his notable songs include "Miami 82" in 2013, "Bright Lights" in 2014, and "Feel Good" in 2016.

Born and raised in Pärnu, Estonia, Pais studied classical piano growing up and discovered synthesizers as a teenager, which led to his interest in dance music. He began producing his own music around 2004, eventually catching the ear of Swedish DJ Avicii, who signed him to his label Le7els Records in 2012. That same year, Pais headlined the Creamfields Dance Music Festival in the UK, further increasing his profile. His remix of Avicii's "Silhouettes" also reached number 20 on the Digital Top 100 Dance Remix chart in 2012.

== Early life ==
He attended music school from an early age and aspired to become a pianist. A friend made him listen to some famous dance tracks on cassette tape, and he fell in love with electronic dance music, turning into a producer when he was 19 years old. He initially produced songs in the trance genre under the name "DNS Project", but then moved to his current house genre. He is influenced by classical composers such as German composer Hans Zimmer and John Williams, as well as electronic artists such as Daft Punk, and his songs incorporate many elements. After creating progressive house songs, he sent some demos to Avicii's LE7ELS Records label, but they were not well received at first. However, he did not give up and continued to send songs, and he sent a song called "April", which finally became a hit with Avicii and led to a contract with Le7els.

== Career ==
Pais started out on Avicii's LE7ELS record label and management. His singles and remixes have amassed over 1.4 billion total streams on YouTube and Spotify. Syn Cole has also released music on record labels Universal, Sony, Warner, Spinnin' Records, Ultra Records, NCS and Martin Garrix STMPD RCRDS. He has played at the festivals Tomorrowland, Creamfields, EDC Las Vegas, Ultra Miami. In addition, clubs Ushuaia Ibiza, XS Las Vegas, Exchange LA and others.

Pais kicked off his remix duties with Avicii's "Silhouettes", which became his first BBC Radio 1 spotlight. As of May 2026, the remix has over 274 million streams on Spotify. His second Avicii remix "Hey Brother" received both radio and DJ support across the globe. His first vocal single "Miami 82" (with remixes from Avicii and Kygo) reached Top 10 US Billboard Club Play chart and Top 20 on the Billboard Dance Chart. Billboard Magazine included it in their list 10 Best Electronic/Dance songs of 2014. In 2018 it was soundtracked for Sprite’s TV commercial featuring Blackpink. Pais released "Feel Good" via NCS record label in 2016. In 2017, a new version "Got the Feeling" was released via Sony/RCA, featuring kirstin from Pentatonix. The single "Who You Are" reached the 4th spot on the Billboard Club songs chart in 2018. His vocal single "It's You" was soundtracked for 2017 feature films 47 Meters Down and Reality High.

== Discography ==
=== Singles ===
Title	Year	Peak chart positions			
Title	Year	EST Airplay	US Dance/ Elec.	US Dance Club	US Dance Airplay
"April"	2013	—	—	—	—
"Miami 82" (featuring Madame Buttons)	2013	—	35	11	17
"Bright Lights"	2014	—	—	—	—
"Pump!" (with Felguk)	2015	—	—	—	—
"It's You"	2015	—	—	—	39
"May"	2015	—	—	—	—
"Feel Good"	2016	2	—	—	—
"The Daze" (featuring Madame Buttons)	2016	2	—	—	—
"Follow Me" (featuring Joshua Radin)	2016	11	—	—	—
"Californication" (featuring Caroline Pennell)	2016	—	—	—	—
"Sway" (featuring Nevve)	2017	—	—	—	—
"Got the Feeling" (featuring kirstin)	2017	—	—	—	—
"Who You Are" (featuring MIO)	2018	—	26	4	34
"Happy Again" (featuring Lissa)	2018	—	—	—	—
"Getaway"	2018	—	—	—	—
"Horizon 83"	2019	—	—	—	—
"Lights Go Down" (with Dakota)	2019	—	—	—	—
"Discovery" (with Victor Crone)	2019	—	—	—	—
"Gizmo"	2019	—	—	—	—
"Cool with That" (featuring Golden Age)	2019	—	—	—	—
"Mind Blown"	2019	—	—	—	—
"Keep Going"	2019	—	—	—	—
"Groove"	2020	—	—	—	—
"Cinematix"	2020	—	—	—	—
"Gold" (featuring Graham Candy)	2020	—	—	—	—
"Rush"	2020	—	—	—	—
"Catch" (featuring Victor Crone)	2020	—	—	—	—
"Over You" (featuring Carly Paige)	2020	—	—	—	—
"Crawl" (featuring Sarah Close)	2020	—	—	—	—
"Time"	2020	—	—	—	—
"Thinking of You"	2020	—	—	—	—
"Breathe" (featuring Kaspara)	2021	—	—	—	—
"Feels Like Love" (featuring Miya Miya)	2021	—	—	—	—
"Drive"	2021	—	—	—	—
"Wicked" (featuring Jojee)	2021	—	—	—	—
"Drift"	2021	—	—	—	—
"Sorry I Ain't Sorry" (with Willim and Katy Tiz)	2021	—	—	—	—
"Melodia"	2021	—	—	—	—
"Like This"	2022	—	—	—	—
"Overdrive" (featuring Carla Monroe)	2022	—	—	—	—
"Need Ya"	2022	—	—	—	—
"Shadow" (featuring Alida)	2022	—	—	—	—
"Somewhere" (with Andrah)	2022	—	—	—	—
"Do It Now"	2022	—	—	—	—
"Without it" (with Novia Bachmid)	2023	—	—	—	—
"Reflect"	2023	—	—	—	—
"Lovely Day"	2023	—	—	—	—
"Let You Go" (with ANML KNGDM)	2023	—	—	—	—
"Holding Back" (with Forester)	2023	—	—	—	—
"Edge Of The World" (with Katie Pearlman)	2023	—	—	—	—
"iGotta"	2024	—	—	—	—
"Don't Break My Heart"	2024	—	—	—	—
"Loose Ends" (with Lucas Estrada)	2024	—	—	—	—
"Rescue Me"	2024	—	—	—	—
"Crazy"	2024	—	—	—	—
"Waterfall" (featuring Alida)	2024	—	—	—	—
"Fantasia" (with K-931)	2024	—	—	—	—
"I Can Feel"	2024	—	—	—	—
"Observe"	2025	—	—	—	—
"All Night"	2025	—	—	—	—
"Another Way" (with Vikkstar and KDH featuring Joe Jury)	2025	—	—	—	—
"Other Side" (featuring Tygersounds)	2025	_	_	_	_
"Waking Up"	2025	_	_	_	_
"Ngoma" (with Foínix and Daramola)	2025	_	_	_	_
"Life" (with Edward Maya)	2025	_	_	_	_
"Between The Lines" (with Ekko)	2025	_	_	_	_
"Momentum"	2025	_	_	_	_
"Ain't Nobody" (with Vidi Roca)	2025	_	_	_	_
"Real Love" (featuring Alexander Jean)	2025	_	_	_	_
"Chasing Echoes"	2026	_	_	_	_
"Stories Untold"	2026	_	_	_	_
"Feel Good" (with Nakama)	2026	_	_	_	_
"Weightless"	2026	_	_	_	_
"Found Me" (with Sara Phillips)	2026	_	_	_	_

=== Remixes ===
Year	Title	Original artist(s)
2012	"Silhouettes"	Avicii
2013	"Lucky Ones"	Kerli
2013	"Hey Brother"	Avicii
2014	"Find You"	Zedd (featuring Matthew Koma and Miriam Bryant)
2014	"Unconditionally"	Katy Perry
2014	"Sing"	Ed Sheeran
2014	"First Love"	Jennifer Lopez
2014	"A Sky Full Of Stars"	Coldplay
2014	"No Enemiesz"	Kiesza
2014	"These Days"	Take That
2015	"Goodbye"	Feder (featuring Lyse)
2015	"Warriors"	Nicky Romero and Volt & State
2016	"Don't Be So Hard On Yourself"	Jess Glynne
2016	"California Love"	Cold Chilling Collective and The Rooks
2017	"Chained To The Rhythm"	Katy Perry
2017	"Mama"	Jonas Blue (featuring William Singe)
2017	"Younger Now"	Miley Cyrus
2017	"Changes"	Hazers
2017	"We Could Go Back"	Jonas Blue (featuring Moelogo)
2018	"Give n Take"	Call Me Loop
2018	"I Wanna Know"	NOTD (featuring Bea Miller)
2018	"Done for Me"	Charlie Puth (featuring Kehlani)
2018	"Follow Your Fire"	Kodaline
2018	"Remind Me To Forget"	Kygo (featuring Miguel)
2018	"Secrets"	P!nk
2018	"Ocean"	Martin Garrix (featuring Khalid)
2018	"Solo"	Clean Bandit (featuring Demi Lovato)
2018	"Losing It Over You"	Matoma (featuring Ayme)
2018	"Diamond Heart"	Alan Walker (featuring Sophia Somajo)
2019	"Colder"	Nina Nesbitt
2019	"Selfish"	Dimitri Vegas & Like Mike (featuring Era Istrefi)
2019	"What I Like About You"	Jonas Blue (featuring Theresa Rex)
2019	"Mad Love"	Mabel
2019	"Never Really Over"	Katy Perry
2019	"Using"	Ritual and Emily Warren
2020	"Look Into My Eyes"	Brando
2020	"Dancing Next To Me"	Greyson Chance
2020	"Salt"	Ava Max
2020	"Say Something"	Kylie Minogue
2020	"Naked"	Jonas Blue and Max
2020	"Baby"	Madison Beer
2020	"Slow Grenade"	Ellie Goulding and Lauv
2021	"Fake A Smile"	Alan Walker and Salem Ilese
2021	"All I Know So Far"	Pink
2022	"Three Little Words" (VIP Mix)	Lynnea M and Syn Cole
2023	"Nothing Is Lost"	The Weeknd
2023	"What Love Is"	Zak Abel
2023	"We Got History"	Mitchell Tenpenny
2024	"Exes"	Tate Mcrae
