= Give Me a Minute =

2007 single by Kodaline

Single by 21 Demands
- Released: March 2007

21 Demands singles chronology
"Give Me a Minute" (2007)	"High Hopes" (2013)

"Give Me a Minute" is a song by Dublin rock band 21 Demands. It was released in March 2007 and topped the Irish Singles Chart for the chart dated 22 March 2007. This is the band's only charting hit as 21 Demands, before they changed their name to Kodaline.

== Charts ==
Chart (2007)	Peak position
Ireland (IRMA)	1

== Release history ==
Region	Date	Format	Label
Ireland	March 2007	CD, digital download	Self-released

== See also ==
- List of number-one singles of 2007 (Ireland)
