= Brand New Day (Kodaline song) =

Single by Kodaline

from the album In a Perfect World
- Released: 23 August 2013
- Recorded: 2012
- Genre: Alternative rock, folk rock
- Length: 3:23
- Label: B-Unique
- Songwriters: Steve Garrigan; Mark Prendergrast; Vincent May
- Producer: Stephen Harris

Kodaline singles chronology
"Love like This" (2013)	"Brand New Day" (2013)	"All I Want" (2013)

"Brand New Day" is a song by Dublin-based alternative rock quartet Kodaline. The song was released as a digital download on 23 August 2013, as the third single from their debut studio album In a Perfect World (2013). The song peaked at number 29 on the Irish Singles Chart and number 75 on the UK Singles Chart.

== Music video ==
A music video to accompany the release of "Brand New Day" was first released onto YouTube on 7 August 2013 at a total length of three minutes and thirty-two seconds.

== Track listing ==
Digital download – EP
No.	Title	Length
1.	"Brand New Day" (Radio Mix)	3:23
2.	"Gabriel"	4:32
3.	"Brand New Day" (feat. Nina Nesbitt) (Acoustic Version)	3:41
4.	"Perfect World" (Acoustic Version)	2:57

== Chart performance ==
=== Weekly charts ===
Chart (2013)	Peak position
Ireland (IRMA)	29
UK Singles (Official Charts Company)	75

== Release history ==
Region	Date	Format	Label
Ireland	23 August 2013	Digital download	B-Unique
United Kingdom	23 August 2013	Digital download	B-Unique
