= Feels So Good =

Feels So Good or Feel So Good may refer to:

== Albums ==
- Feels So Good (Atomic Kitten album), 2002, or its title track
- Feels So Good (Chuck Mangione album), 1977, or its title track
- Feels So Good (Grover Washington, Jr. album), 1975, or the title track
- Feels So Good (Lina Santiago album), 1996, or its title track

== Songs ==
- "Feels So Good" (composition), a 1978 instrumental by Chuck Mangione
- "Feels So Good" (Armin van Buuren song), 2011
- "Feels So Good" (Mel B song), 2000
- "Feels So Good" (Xscape song), 1995
- "Feels So Good (Show Me Your Love)", by Lina Santiago, 1996
- "Feels So Good", a B-side to Whitney Houston's "I'm Your Baby Tonight", 1990
- "It Feels So Good", by Sonique, 1998
- "(It) Feels So Good", by Steven Tyler, 2011
- "Feel So Good", by Mase, 1997
- "Feels So Good", by 311 from Music, 1993
- "Feels So Good", by B-15 Project, 2001
- "Feels So Good", by Brand Nubian from One for All, 1990
- "Feels So Good", by Kylie Minogue from Kiss Me Once, 2014
- "Feels So Good", by Remy Ma from There's Something About Remy: Based on a True Story, 2006
- "Feels So Good", by Van Halen from OU812, 1988
- "Feel So Good", by Shirley & Lee, later a hit for Johnny Preston as "Feel So Fine", 1955
- "Feel So Good", by Ashanti from Chapter II, 2003
- "Feel So Good", by B.A.P from Carnival, 2016
- "Feel So Good", by Christine and the Queens from Chris, 2016
- "Feel So Good", by Jamiroquai from A Funk Odyssey, 2001
- "Feel So Good", by Jefferson Airplane from Bark, 1971
- "Feel So Good", by Jon the Dentist and Ollie Jaye, 2000

== See also ==
- Feel Good (disambiguation)
- Feeling Good (disambiguation)
