= Carry Me (song) =

Single by Kygo featuring Julia Michaels

from the album Cloud Nine
- Released: 12 August 2016
- Genre: Tropical house
- Length: 3:53
- Label: Sony; Ultra
- Songwriters: Kyrre Gørvell-Dahll; Julia Michaels; Justin Tranter
- Producer: Kygo

Kygo singles chronology
"Raging" (2016)	"Carry Me" (2016)	"It Ain't Me" (2017)

Julia Michaels singles chronology
"Surrender" (2014)	"Carry Me" (2016)	"Issues" (2017)

Music video
- "Carry Me" on YouTube

"Carry Me" is a song by Norwegian DJ and music producer Kygo, featuring vocals from American singer Julia Michaels. It was released as sixth single from the album Cloud Nine. It was released via digital download on 12 August 2016 by Sony and Ultra. The song was written by Kygo, Michaels and Justin Tranter and produced by Kygo. The song was performed at the 2016 Summer Olympics closing ceremony in the Maracanã Stadium on 21 August 2016.

== Background and writing ==
"Carry Me" was written Kygo, Julia Michaels and Justin Tranter and produced by Kygo.

== Recording and composition ==
"Carry Me" features Julia Michaels' lead vocals and Justin Tranter backing vocals. Miles Walker mixed the track at Silent Sound Studios, Atlanta, Georgia with assistance from Ryan Jumper and John Horesco IV completed the audio mastering.

Musically, "Carry Me" is a three minutes and fifty-three seconds uptempo tropical house song. In terms of music notation, "Carry Me" was composed using 4/4 common time in the key of G major, with a moderate tempo of 105 beats per minute. The song follows the chord progression of C-G-D-Em while Michaels' vocal range spans from the low note B_{3} to the high note of C_{5}, giving the song one octave and one note of range.

== Music video ==
Prior to the release of the music video, Kygo debuted a lyric video for the song on August 29, 2016 on Ultra Music YouTube channel. The lyric video, by Luca Brenna for Superbros and Johannes Lovund, was illustrated by Sprankenstein and was animated by Jonathan Folkard. The lyric shows Kygo playing piano and Michaels recording the song on a studio with an orchestra playing strings.

The music video, produced by Savage Isle Productions and Kygo, was released on 5 October 2016 on Kygo's official Vevo channel. The video shows Kygo going out with friends on vacation, and it contains scenes on a yacht, on a footage from a festival and poolside shenanigans.

== Credits and personnel ==
Recording and management

- Mixed at Silent Sound Studios (Atlanta, Georgia)
- Published by Sony/ATV Music Publishing Ltd., Warner Chappell

Personnel

- Kygo – songwriting, production
- Julia Michaels – vocals, songwriting
- Justin Tranter – songwriting, backing vocals
- Miles Walker – mixing
- Ryan Jumper – assistant
- John Horesco IV – mastering for One Up Mastering

Credits adapted from Cloud Nine liner notes.

== Charts ==
=== Weekly charts ===
Chart (2016)	Peak position
Australia (ARIA)	77
Belgium (Ultratip Bubbling Under Flanders)	40
Belgium (Ultratop 50 Wallonia)	38
Czech Republic Airplay (ČNS IFPI)	100
France (SNEP)	97
Netherlands (Dutch Top 40)	28
Netherlands (Single Top 100)	81
Norway (VG-lista)	39
Russia Airplay (Tophit)	203
Scottish Singles Sales (Official Charts)	45
UK Singles (Official Charts)	133
US Hot Dance/Electronic Songs (Billboard)	16

=== Year-end charts ===
Chart (2016)	Position
US Hot Dance/Electronic Songs (Billboard)	51

== Certifications ==
Region	Certification	Certified units/sales
Canada (Music Canada)	Gold	40,000^{‡}
^{‡} Sales+streaming figures based on certification alone.

== Release history ==
Region	Date	Format	Label
Worldwide	August 12, 2016	Digital download	Sony
