= Honest (Kodaline song) =

Single by Kodaline

from the album Coming Up for Air
- Released: 8 December 2014
- Recorded: 2014
- Genre: Indie rock, alternative rock
- Length: 3:38
- Label: B-Unique
- Songwriters: Steve Garrigan; Mark Prendergrast; Vincent May; Jacknife Lee
- Producer: Jacknife Lee

Kodaline singles chronology
"One Day" (2014)	"Honest" (2014)	"The One" (2015)

Music video
- "Honest" on YouTube

"Honest" is a song by Dublin-based alternative rock quartet Kodaline. The song was released on 1 February 2015 as the lead single from the band's second studio album, Coming Up for Air (2015). "Honest" became the band's third top 10 single in their home country, Ireland, following "High Hopes" (2013) and "Love Like This" (2013).

== Track listing ==
Digital download
No.	Title	Length
1.	"Honest"	3:38

== Charts ==
Chart (2015)	Peak position
Ireland (IRMA)	7
Scotland Singles (OCC)	19
UK Singles (OCC)	39

== Release history ==
Region	Date	Format
United Kingdom	1 February 2015	Digital download
