= Maty Noyes =

American singer-songwriter (born 1997)

- Noyes performing live at Indie Pop Party with Molly Moore and Friends at William Steinmetz Park in 2026.

Background information
- Born: Madeline Ashley Noyes; August 25, 1997 (age 29)
- Origin: Corinth, Mississippi
- Years active: 2013–present
- Labels: MITS Records; Republic; Lava

Madeline Ashley "Maty" Noyes (born August 25, 1997) is an American singer-songwriter. Noyes rose to prominence in 2015 after a guest appearance on the Weeknd's Beauty Behind the Madness album, and contributing lead vocals to Kygo's 2015 track "Stay", which achieved international success. She has since released the solo EPs Noyes Complaint (2016) and Love Songs From A Lolita (2018) and her debut album The Feeling's Mutual (2021)

== Biography ==
=== Early life ===
Noyes grew up in Corinth, Mississippi and has a sister named Abby and a brother named Grant. Her mother signed her up for piano lessons at a young age, but she decided the piano wasn't for her. At age 12 she asked for an acoustic guitar and was writing her own songs within a week. Her first composition at age 12 was a song called "Bigger", which she describes as being "about a girl who was really pretty, but didn't think she was pretty, so she was too afraid to kiss anyone. So her lips got so big that they fell off." Her early influences included the likes of the Beatles, Johnny Cash, Elvis Presley, Marvin Gaye and James Brown. She says she hated school, didn't feel like she fit in and "didn't really get along with anyone", and had no desire to attend college after finishing high school.

At age 16, she convinced her parents to allow her to move to Nashville to pursue a career in music. She played open mic nights as often as possible and made connections in the music business. She later moved to Los Angeles in further pursuit of a career in music.

=== Career ===
While still a teenager, Noyes received her big break when she provided vocals for the Weeknd's song, "Angel" from the Grammy-winning album Beauty Behind the Madness, released in August, 2015. She has said that, as a virtually unknown vocalist, receiving an opportunity to perform with a successful artist such as the Weeknd was "amazing" and an honor. The Weeknd had no idea she would be singing on the track: "I was in the studio with the producer we were both working with, and I was like, 'Hey, let's throw it down. Let's not tell him.' Because you can't really tell people you're going to do something, or else they'll be like, 'No, no, no.' You kinda have to make them think it's more their idea." Ultimately, he loved the song.

Later that year she provided the vocals to the song "Stay" by Kygo. The single achieved Gold status in several countries including the UK, Australia, Italy, New Zealand, and Poland. Of the collaboration she has said, "Basically, I wrote the song and sent it to [Kygo], because I wanted someone to do a drop to it, and I loved his drops. And surely enough, he loved it, and did it in three days, and it came out two weeks later." Performing the song live with Kygo in front of large crowds helped Noyes become more comfortable on stage, helping her overcome any fear she may have had. After missing a show due to illness, Noyes was banned by Kygo's manager from performing at his two sold-out Hollywood Bowl shows in October 2016. Award-winning singer Kesha subsequently came to her defense, saying that Noyes was being treated "like shit".

In 2015, she released "Haunted" as part of the soundtrack for the film Secret in Their Eyes. In 2016, she released her debut solo single "In My Mind" from her first EP called Noyes Complaint, as well as providing the vocals to "Drowning in Champagne" by Yellow Claw. In 2017, she released the single "Say It to My Face".

In 2021, Noyes released her debut album, The Feeling's Mutual which consists of sixteen songs.

== Discography ==
=== Studio albums ===
List of albums and selected details
| Title | Details |
|---|---|
| The Feeling's Mutual | Released: September 3, 2021; Label: MITS Records; Format: Digital download, streaming |
| Rainbow Syndrome | Released: February 14, 2025; Label: Self-released; Format: Digital download, streaming |

=== EPs ===
List of extended plays and selected details
Title
Extended play details
Notes
Noyes Complaint
- Released: October 28, 2016
- Label: Republic Records, Lava Music
- Format: Digital download, streaming, vinyl

| No. | Title | Length |
|---|---|---|
| 1. | "in my miNd" | 3:32 |
| 2. | "lil' bit wrOng" | 3:15 |
| 3. | "takeS one to love one" | 3:29 |
| 4. | "rollin' w Yew" (featuring Lostboycrow) | 3:56 |
| 5. | "falling out of lovE" | 3:31 |
| Total length: | | 17:43 |

Love Songs from a Lolita
- Released: August 10, 2018
- Label: Republic Records, Lava Music
- Format: Digital download, streaming

| No. | Title | Length |
|---|---|---|
| 1. | "Spiraling Down" | 3:07 |
| 2. | "Porn Star" | 2:41 |
| 3. | "Lava Lamps" (featuring Beekwilder) | 3:27 |
| 4. | "New Friends" | 3:10 |
| 5. | "Boys Like You" | 3:51 |
| 6. | "Perspective" (featuring Hazers) | 2:51 |
| Total length: | | 19:07 |

=== Singles ===
==== As lead artist ====
| Title | Year | Peak chart positions | | | Album |
| Title | Year | CZE | SLK | SWE | Album |
|---|---|---|---|---|---|
| "Haunted" | 2015 | — | — | — | Secret in Their Eyes (Original Motion Picture Soundtrack) |
| "In My Mind" | 2016 | 46 | 51 | 72 | Noyes Complaint |
| "London" | 2017 | — | — | — | Non-album singles |
| "Say It to My Face" | 2017 | — | — | — | Non-album singles |
| "Goodbye" (with Mokita) | 2017 | — | — | — | Non-album singles |
| "Spiraling Down" | 2018 | — | — | — | Love Songs from a Lolita |
| "Lava Lamps" (featuring Beekwilder) | 2018 | — | — | — | Love Songs from a Lolita |
| "Porn Star" | 2018 | — | — | — | Love Songs from a Lolita |
| "Wherever U Are" (with adam&steve) | 2019 | — | — | — | Non-album single |
| "Love Don't Cost a Thang" (featuring Franke and Lemaitre) | 2020 | — | — | — | The Feeling's Mutual |
| "Sunlight" | 2020 | — | — | — | The Feeling's Mutual |
| "Man Needs a Woman" | 2020 | — | — | — | The Feeling's Mutual |
| "Wrong" | 2020 | — | — | — | The Feeling's Mutual |
| "Lowkey" (with Franke) | 2020 | — | — | — | The Feeling's Mutual |
| "Alexander" | 2021 | — | — | — | The Feeling's Mutual |
| "Cake" | 2021 | — | — | — | The Feeling's Mutual |
| "California Palms" | 2021 | — | — | — | The Feeling's Mutual |
| "Lighter Thief" | 2023 | — | — | — | Rainbow Syndrome |
| "Ambience & Apple Pie" | 2023 | — | — | — | Rainbow Syndrome |
| "Idea" | 2023 | — | — | — | Rainbow Syndrome |
| "10 Minutes Away" | 2023 | — | — | — | Rainbow Syndrome |
| "Folder" | 2024 | — | — | — | Rainbow Syndrome |
| "Yoo-Hoo" | 2024 | — | — | — | Rainbow Syndrome |
| "Hotel Dream Girl" (with Spencer Ludwig) | 2024 | — | — | — | Rainbow Syndrome |
"—" denotes a recording that did not chart or was not released in that territory.

==== As featured artist ====
| Title | Year | Peak chart positions | | | | | | | | | | Certifications | Album |
| Title | Year | UK | AUS | AUT | CAN | GER | IRE | NZ | SWE | SWI | US Bub. | Certifications | Album |
|---|---|---|---|---|---|---|---|---|---|---|---|---|---|
| "Stay" (Kygo featuring Maty Noyes) | 2015 | 20 | 67 | 30 | 59 | 38 | 13 | 39 | 3 | 11 | 6 | ARIA: Gold; BVMI: Gold; FIMI: Gold; RMNZ: Gold; ZPAV: Gold; BPI: Gold; RIAA: Gold | Cloud Nine |
| "Too Soon" (Vanic featuring Maty Noyes) | 2017 | — | — | — | — | — | — | — | — | — | — | | non-album singles |
| "Higher" (Lemaitre featuring Maty Noyes) | 2017 | — | — | — | — | — | — | — | — | — | — | | Chapter One |
"—" denotes a recording that did not chart or was not released in that territory.
