= One Day (Kodaline song) =

Single by Kodaline

from the album In a Perfect World
- Released: 6 February 2014
- Recorded: 2012
- Genre: Alternative rock, indie folk
- Length: 4:15
- Label: B-Unique
- Songwriter(s): Steve Garrigan; Mark Prendergrast; Vincent May
- Producer(s): Stephen Harris

Kodaline singles chronology
"All I Want" (2014)	"One Day" (2014)	"Honest" (2014)

"One Day" is a song by Dublin-based alternative rock quartet Kodaline. The song was released as a digital download on 2014, as the fifth single from their debut studio album In a Perfect World (2013).

== Music video ==
A music video to accompany the release of "One Day" was first released onto YouTube on 27 January 2014 at a total length of three minutes and forty-six seconds.

== Track listing ==
Digital download
No.	Title	Length
1.	"One Day"	4:15

== Chart performance ==
=== Weekly charts ===
Chart (2014)	Peak position
Ireland (IRMA)	19
UK Singles (Official Charts Company)	136

== Release history ==
Region	Date	Format	Label
Ireland	6 February 2014	Digital download	B-Unique
