= Nothing Left (Kygo song) =

Single by Kygo featuring Will Heard

from the album Cloud Nine
- Released: 31 July 2015
- Recorded: 2015
- Genre: Tropical house
- Length: 3:56
- Label: Sony
- Songwriters: Kyrre Gørvell-Dahll; Will Heard
- Producer: Kygo

Kygo singles chronology
"Sexual Healing" (2015)	"Nothing Left" (2015)	"Here for You" (2015)

Will Heard singles chronology
"Can't Keep Up" (2014)	"Nothing Left" (2015)	"I Will for Love" (2015)

Audio video
- "Nothing Left" on YouTube

"Nothing Left" is a single by Norwegian DJ Kygo, and features vocals from British singer Will Heard. The song was first played at a live show in Chicago held in partnership with Uber. Users of Uber's mobile app could book a free ride to the secret concert where the song was premiered. "Nothing Left" was commercially released on 31 July 2015. No music video was made for it.

== Track listing ==
Digital download
No.	Title	Length
1.	"Nothing Left" (featuring Will Heard)	3:56

== Charts ==
Chart (2015)	Peak position
Australia (ARIA)	69
Austria (Ö3 Austria Top 40)	58
Belgium (Ultratip Bubbling Under Flanders)	10
Denmark (Tracklisten)	37
Finland (Suomen virallinen lista)	11
France (SNEP)	55
Germany (GfK)	57
Ireland (IRMA)	97
Netherlands (Single Top 100)	81
Norway (VG-lista)	1
Sweden (Sverigetopplistan)	14
Switzerland (Schweizer Hitparade)	26
UK Singles (Official Charts)	79

== Certifications ==
Region	Certification	Certified units/sales
Denmark (IFPI Danmark)	Gold	30,000^{‡}
New Zealand (RMNZ)	Gold	15,000^{‡}
Norway (IFPI Norway)	2× Platinum	80,000^{‡}
^{‡} Sales+streaming figures based on certification alone.
