= Stole the Show =

2015 single by Kygo

Single by Kygo featuring Parson James

from the album Cloud Nine
- B-side: "ID" (Ultra Music Festival Anthem)
- Released: 23 March 2015
- Recorded: 2014
- Genre: Tropical house
- Length: 3:43 (album version); 3:31 (radio edit)
- Label: Sony; B1
- Songwriters: Kyle Kelso; Michael Harwood; Marli Harwood; Ashton Parson; Kyrre Gørvell-Dahll
- Producer: Kygo

Kygo singles chronology
"ID" (2015)	"Stole the Show" (2015)	"Sexual Healing (Kygo remix)" (2015)

Parson James singles chronology
"Religion" (2014)	"Stole the Show" (2015)	"Sinner Like You" (2015)

Music video
- "Stole the Show" on YouTube

"Stole the Show" is a song by Norwegian DJ and record producer Kygo, featuring vocals from American singer Parson James. It was released on 23 March 2015, becoming a hit in a number of countries and the biggest commercial success of Kygo besides "Firestone". Later, on 21 August 2015, a solo version by James was released. This version was included in his EP, The Temple.

== Music video ==
A music video directed by Saman Kesh was also launched in promotion of the single. The video depicts male and female astronauts that mysteriously crash land on earth, and meet up.

== Track listing ==
Digital download
No.	Title	Length
1.	"Stole the Show" (featuring Parson James)	3:43

CD single
No.	Title	Length
1.	"Stole the Show" (featuring Parson James)	3:43
2.	"ID" (Ultra Music Festival Anthem)	4:51

== Charts ==
=== Weekly charts ===
Chart (2015–2016)	Peak position
Australia (ARIA)	53
Austria (Ö3 Austria Top 40)	5
Belgium (Ultratop 50 Flanders)	7
Belgium (Ultratop 50 Wallonia)	7
Canada Hot 100 (Billboard)	79
Canada CHR/Top 40 (Billboard)	42
Czech Republic Airplay (ČNS IFPI)	2
Czech Republic Singles Digital (ČNS IFPI)	4
Denmark (Tracklisten)	3
Finland (Suomen virallinen lista)	2
France (SNEP)	1
Germany (GfK)	2
Hungary (Dance Top 40)	18
Hungary (Rádiós Top 40)	27
Hungary (Single Top 40)	5
Ireland (IRMA)	13
Italy (FIMI)	37
Lebanon (Lebanese Top 20)	7
Netherlands (Dutch Top 40)	3
Netherlands (Single Top 100)	3
New Zealand (Recorded Music NZ)	4
Norway (VG-lista)	1
Poland Airplay (ZPAV)	8
Portugal (AFP)	33
Romania Airplay (Media Forest)	2
Slovakia Airplay (ČNS IFPI)	1
Slovakia Singles Digital (ČNS IFPI)	5
Slovenia (SloTop50)	9
Spain (Promusicae)	6
Sweden (Sverigetopplistan)	1
Switzerland (Schweizer Hitparade)	3
UK Singles (Official Charts)	24
US Bubbling Under Hot 100 Singles (Billboard)	5
US Hot Dance/Electronic Songs (Billboard)	11
US Pop Airplay (Billboard)	33

2026 weekly chart performance
Chart (2026)	Peak position
Norway Airplay (IFPI Norge)	92

=== Year-end charts ===
Chart (2015)	Position
Austria (Ö3 Austria Top 40)	26
Belgium (Ultratop Flanders)	23
Belgium (Ultratop Wallonia)	26
CIS (Tophit)	16
France (SNEP)	15
Germany (Official German Charts)	20
Hungary (Dance Top 40)	77
Hungary (Single Top 40)	32
Italy (FIMI)	56
Netherlands (Dutch Top 40)	5
Netherlands (Single Top 100)	9
New Zealand (Recorded Music NZ)	25
Poland (ZPAV)	50
Spain (PROMUSICAE)	21
Sweden (Sverigetopplistan)	3
Switzerland (Schweizer Hitparade)	11
Russia Airplay (Tophit)	15
Ukraine Airplay (Tophit)	87
UK Singles (Official Charts Company)	73
US Hot Dance/Electronic Songs (Billboard)	20
Chart (2016)	Position
France (SNEP)	125
Hungary (Dance Top 40)	75
Russia Airplay (Tophit)	16

== Certifications ==
Region	Certification	Certified units/sales
Australia (ARIA)	Platinum	70,000^{‡}
Austria (IFPI Austria)	Gold	15,000^{*}
Belgium (BRMA)	Platinum	20,000^{‡}
Canada (Music Canada)	2× Platinum	160,000^{‡}
Denmark (IFPI Danmark)	2× Platinum	120,000^{^}
France (SNEP)	Diamond	233,333^{‡}
Germany (BVMI)	Platinum	400,000^{‡}
Italy (FIMI)	2× Platinum	100,000^{‡}
Mexico (AMPROFON)	Diamond+2× Platinum+Gold	450,000^{‡}
New Zealand (RMNZ)	4× Platinum	120,000^{‡}
Norway (IFPI Norway)	6× Platinum	240,000^{‡}
Poland (ZPAV)	4× Platinum	80,000^{‡}
Spain (Promusicae)	2× Platinum	80,000^{‡}
Sweden (GLF)	5× Platinum	200,000^{‡}
Switzerland (IFPI Switzerland)	3× Platinum	90,000^{‡}
United Kingdom (BPI)	Platinum	600,000^{‡}
United States (RIAA)	Platinum	1,000,000^{‡}
^{*} Sales figures based on certification alone.^{^} Shipments figures based on certification alone.^{‡} Sales+streaming figures based on certification alone.

== Release history ==
Region	Date	Format	Label
Norway; Finland	23 March 2015	Digital download	Sony
Germany; Austria; Switzerland	15 May 2015	CD single	B1

== Parson James solo version ==
"Stole the Show"

Single by Parson James

from the album The Temple EP
- Released: 21 August 2015
- Recorded: 2014
- Length: 3:43
- Label: RCA
- Songwriters: Ashton Parson; Kyle Kelso; Michael Harwood; Marli Harwood
- Producer: Kyle Kelso

Parson James singles chronology
"Sinner Like You" (2015)	"Stole the Show" (2015)

Audio video
- "Stole the Show" on YouTube

On 21 August 2015, a solo version of "Stole the Show" by Parson James was released by RCA Records.

=== Track listing ===
- Digital download
1. "Stole the Show" – 3:43
