= Lina Santiago =

American freestyle singer

- Born: September 5, 1978 (age 47)
- Origin: Los Angeles, California
- Genres: Freestyle
- Occupation: Singer
- Years active: 1993–present
- Label: Universal Records

Lina Santiago (born September 5, 1978) is an American freestyle singer. She is best known for her 1996 single, "Feels So Good (Show Me Your Love)", which peaked at #35 on the Billboard Hot 100 that year. On the US dance chart, the single peaked at #6 and spent a total of 13 weeks on the chart.

Santiago released one album, Feels So Good, in 1996, which included the single of the same name.

== Discography ==
=== Albums ===
- 1996: Feels So Good

=== Singles ===
- 2017: "Mi Amor" featured with Randy Taylor-Weber & Lenny Ruckus
- 1996: "Feels So Good (Show Me Your Love)" – U.S. #35
- 1996: "Just Because I Love You" – U.S. #78
- 1996: "Dale Que Dale"
