= Follow Your Fire =

Single by Kodaline

from the album Politics of Living
- Released: 23 March 2018
- Recorded: 2017
- Genre: Indie pop • electropop
- Length: 3:58
- Label: B-Unique
- Songwriters: Steve Garrigan; Johnny McDaid; Steve Mac
- Producer: Steve Mac

Kodaline singles chronology
"Ready to Change" (2017)	"Follow Your Fire" (2018)	"Shed a Tear" (2018)

"Follow Your Fire" is a song by Dublin-based alternative rock quartet Kodaline. The song was released on 23 March 2018 as the second single from the band's third studio album, Politics of Living (2018). The song peaked at number twenty on the Irish Singles Chart.

== Background ==
In an interview with the Official Charts Company, Steve Garrigan said, "I'm very excited! We worked with Steve Mac and Johnny McDaid on this one. It’s kind of a new sound for us. My comfort zone is in slow ballads – this is not a slow ballad in any sense. Steve Mac was amazing… to share a room with him was an honour really. I think it’s pretty commercial, the single. Every song we’ve done is different, but this is probably the most mainstream."

== Music video ==
A music video to accompany the release of "Follow Your Fire" was first released onto YouTube on 23 March 2018.

== Track listing ==
Digital download
No.	Title	Length
1.	"Follow Your Fire"	3:58

Digital download
No.	Title	Length
1.	"Follow Your Fire" (Syn Cole Remix)	3:06

Digital download
No.	Title	Length
1.	"Follow Your Fire" (Stripped Back Version)	3:46

== Charts ==
Chart (2018)	Peak position
Czech Republic Airplay (ČNS IFPI)	1
Ireland (IRMA)	20
Scotland Singles (OCC)	64
Switzerland (Schweizer Hitparade)	82

== Release history ==
Region	Date	Format	Label
Worldwide	23 March 2018	Digital download	B-Unique
