= Marli Harwood =

- Born: Marilena Buck; 13 March 1975 (age 51); Lytham St Annes, Lancashire, England
- Genres: Pop
- Occupations: Singer, pianist, guitarist, songwriter
- Years active: 1995–present
- Labels: Island Records, V2, Sony, Palm Pictures

Marli Harwood (born Marilena Buck, 13 March 1975, Lytham St Annes, Lancashire, England), also known as Marli Buck, is a British singer and songwriter. A piano and guitar player, she is of Eritrean, Italian, Welsh and English extraction.

== Music career ==
In 1995, Harwood was signed by Chris Blackwell to his Island Records label. During the recording of her debut album, Blackwell decided to sell Island Records, and Harwood's album was never released. In 2002, Harwood appeared on Fame Academy, and finished eighth in the series. She then recorded several albums with various major record labels, which remained unreleased or promoted.

In January 2011, Harwood's song "It's Called a Heart" was played to Jeff Smith, head of music at BBC Radio 2, by her management team and on 25 January it was announced by the Press Association that the track was Record of the Week on Radio 2. Harwood released "It's Called a Heart" via her website on 21 February 2011.

Harwood had a maternity clause added to her recording contract, which was described as a first. With a final working date of 1 July 2011 before the birth, Island Records were pushing to get her 12-track album Clocks and Full Stops released. The single from the album, "Billy", was released on 30 May with the album following.

Harwood also contributed vocals to the 2012 track Silence, the title track of Tom Tyler's debut album.

Marli has co written the Kygo hit single "Stole the Show" and continues to have cuts worldwide including Kim Hyun Joong in Korea whose album went to number 1 on the Billboard world chart.

Marli Harwood is a writer at Tileyard Studios.

== Discography ==
=== Albums ===
- Clocks and Full Stops (2011) – Island Records

=== Singles ===
- "It's Called a Heart" (2011)
- "Billy" (2011)

=== Songwriting credits ===
- "Innocent" Junge Junge & Joe Cleere (2020)
- "Getaway" Viki Gabor (2020)
- "Complicated" Miss Li (2020)
- "Cigarette Row (Five O Clock Freedom) Jessie Buckley (2019)
- "Falling" Lyra (2019)
- "Strangers In The Night" DJ MEG (2018)
- "Feeling It For The First Time" The Atlas (2018)
- "Honest" Kim Cesarian (2018)
- "You and I" Asmik Shiroyen (2018)
- "Forever Young" Young Stadium Club 2017
- "Aqualung" Nause feat. Miss Li (2017)
- "Aqualung" Miss Li (2017)
- "Throw Your Love" Ida Da Silva(2017)
- "Rooftops" Tobtok feat. Sorana (2017)
- "Party On A Weekday" Mybadd feat. Olivia Holt (2017)
- "I Don't Wanna Fight" Salena Mastroianni (2017)
- "Soldier" High Valley (2016)
- "Forgiveness" Sam Feldt feat. Joe Cleere (2016)
- "Stole the Show" Kygo feat. Parson James (2015)
- "Loving Like This" Sabella (2015)
- "It Hurts" Anna David (2014)
- "Gentleman" Kim Hyun Joong (2013)
- "Let Me Fly" Sara Kempe (2011)
