= Fragile (Kygo and Labrinth song) =

Promotional single by Kygo and Labrinth

from the album Cloud Nine
- Released: 18 March 2016
- Recorded: 2015
- Genre: Soul; house
- Length: 3:50
- Label: Sony
- Songwriters: Jimmy Messer; Kyrre Gørvell-Dahll; Timothy McKenzie
- Producers: Kygo; Labrinth

Lyric video
- "Fragile" on YouTube

"Fragile" is a 2016 song by Norwegian DJ and record producer Kygo and British singer Labrinth. It was released as the first promotional single from Kygo's debut studio album, Cloud Nine.

== Charts ==
Chart (2016)	Peak position
Australia (ARIA)	74
Austria (Ö3 Austria Top 40)	69
Germany (GfK)	87
Netherlands (Single Top 100)	78
Norway (VG-lista)	1
Sweden (Sverigetopplistan)	55
Switzerland (Schweizer Hitparade)	50
UK Dance (Official Charts)	26

== Certifications ==
Region	Certification	Certified units/sales
New Zealand (RMNZ)	Gold	15,000^{‡}
^{‡} Sales+streaming figures based on certification alone.

== Release history ==
Region	Date	Format	Label
Various	18 March 2016	Digital download	Sony
