= Ready (Kodaline song) =

Single by Kodaline

from the album Coming Up for Air
- Released: 15 May 2015
- Recorded: 2014
- Length: 3:53
- Label: B-Unique

Kodaline singles chronology
"Honest" (2015)	"Ready" (2015)	"Raging" (2016)

"Ready" is a song by Dublin-based alternative rock quartet Kodaline. The song was released on 15 May 2015 as the third single from the band's second studio album, Coming Up for Air (2015).

== Music video ==
A music video to accompany the release of "Ready" was first released onto YouTube on 3 June 2015. The music video shows Christopher Mintz-Plasse as a former jockey preparing for a return to horse riding, regardless of his wheelchair. It shows his journey from training to coming face-to-face with horses again. The music video was made in support of the Permanently Disabled Jockeys Fund.

== Charts ==
Chart (2015)	Peak position
Ireland (IRMA)	64
UK Singles (Official Charts Company)	187

== Composition ==
"Ready" is written in the key of B♭ major with a tempo of 134 beats per minute.

== Release history ==
Region	Date	Format	Label
United Kingdom	15 May 2015	Digital download	B-Unique
