= In My Mind (Maty Noyes song) =

Single by Maty Noyes

from the album Noyes Complaint
- Released: July 8, 2016
- Recorded: 2016
- Genre: Pop
- Length: 3:32
- Label: Republic
- Songwriters: William Wiik Larsen; Maty Noyes
- Producers: Maty Noyes; William Wiik Larsen

Maty Noyes singles chronology
"Stay" (2015)	"In My Mind" (2016)	"London" (2017)

"In My Mind" is the debut single by American singer-songwriter Maty Noyes, released on July 8, 2016, as the lead and only single from her debut EP Noyes Complaint. The song was written by Noyes and Norwegian songwriter William Wiik Larsen and produced by the duo as well.

Musically, "In My Mind" is a harmonic, retro-pop song which makes use of electric guitar and drum instrumentation. The vocals are backed by mildly synthesized beats.

The song charted in Sweden, Slovakia, and the Czech Republic. An accompanying music video was released to Noyes's Vevo account on September 7, 2016, ahead of the EP's release. It features Noyes having mixed feelings about a lover in a bedroom, and singing the song while contemplating what to do. The video also features a flower theme: Noyes can be seen singing in a bed of flowers and in a bathtub surrounded by flowers that appear to be Rhododendrons. The video has achieved over 6 million views on YouTube/Vevo.

== Background and composition ==
The song was written by Noyes and William Wiik Larsen and produced by the duo as well.

The song utilizes G, E minor, C, and D chords.

Lyrically, Maty Noyes told Fader in an email that the song is about a situation where she was too in love to walk away, "Love makes people do and say crazy things. Sometimes you need to escape to a place within to gain perspective and remind yourself that the relationship is worth it, even when it doesn't feel that way in the moment. "In My Mind" talks about this need for clarity – the need for a mental escape."

== Critical response ==
In an interview with Noyes, writer James Wood of AXS commented, "It's a track that combines tasty elements of classic orchestration with 21st-century groove." Calvin Paradise, a writer for BitCandy, wrote a positive review of the track: "At the risk of over-exaggerating, "In My Mind" is a perfect slice of pop. Co-written with Norwegian songwriter William Wiik Larsen (whom no one has heard of), the track feels [instantly] familiar, like it's already been on loop in your brain for days." Mike Wass, a writer for Idolator, wrote of the song, "The 18-year-old returns today with "In My Mind" — a brooding mid-tempo pop song with intricate production and a deceptively catchy chorus. You'll be hooked after the second listen!"

== Chart performance ==
"In My Mind" has gained some traction in Europe, peaking at number 46 in the Czech Republic, 51 in Slovakia, and reaching number 72 on the Sweden Sverigetopplistan singles chart.

== Music video ==
The music video for "In My Mind" was uploaded to Noyes's Vevo account on September 7, 2016. The video was directed by Dano Cerny and produced by Lauren Solie. It features Noyes and her lover contemplating the complications of their relationship in a bedroom with dim lighting. Noyes is also watching a TV, which depicts dizzying images of flowers. As Noyes sings the song, there are intercut scenes of Noyes singing and posing on the bed, in a bed of flowers, and in a field of grass while wearing a blue dress. In the second verse of the song, she is seen in a bathtub surrounded by flowers, wearing a black bra. Later in the video, Noyes is watching her lover chase her through a field on the TV.

== Charts ==
Chart (2016)	Peak position
Czech Republic (Rádio Top 100)	46
Slovakia (Rádio Top 100)	51
Sweden (Sverigetopplistan)	72
