= Miami 82 =

2013 song by Syn Cole and Madame Buttons

Single by Syn Cole featuring Madame Buttons
- Released: December 13, 2013
- Genre: Electro house
- Label: LE7ELS
- Songwriters: Kelly Sheehan; Rene Pais

Syn Cole singles chronology
"Miami 82" (2013)	"Bright Lights" (2014)

"Miami 82" is a song by Estonian DJ Syn Cole featuring Madame Buttons. The song was released as a digital download on December 13, 2013, through LE7ELS.

== Background ==
The first vocal single, "Miami 82", was released in 2013 and remixed by Kygo and Avicii. The song reached No. 11 on Billboard's Club Play chart. His song and remix have received repeated airplay on BBC Radio 1 in the UK. The single "Miami 82" was used as background music for a 2018 Sprite TV commercial featuring members of Blackpink.

== Charts ==
Chart (2013)	Peak position
UK Streaming (Official Charts)	80
US Dance Club Songs (Billboard)	11
US Hot Dance/Electronic Songs (Billboard)	35

== Certifications ==
Region	Certification	Certified units/sales
Sweden (GLF) Lucas Silow remix	Platinum	8,000,000^{†}
^{†} Streaming-only figures based on certification alone.
