= Tales from the Backseat =

Studio album by the Academic
- Released: 12 January 2018
- Genres: Indie rock; indie pop
- Length: 34:22
- Labels: Room 6; Downtown

The Academic chronology
Loose Friends (2015)	Tales from the Backseat (2018)	Acting My Age (2020)

Singles from Tales from the Backseat
- 1. "Different" Released: 27 April 2015; 2. "Bear Claws" Released: 7 July 2017; 3. "Permanent Vacation" Released: 26 October 2017; 4. "Why Can't We Be Friends?" Released: 17 November 2017

Tales from the Backseat is the debut studio album by Irish indie rock band the Academic, released on 12 January 2018 by Room 6 Records. It debuted at number 1 on the Irish Albums Chart and received generally favourable critical reception, with the album being nominated for Irish Record of the Year by RTE.

== Production ==
Tales from the Backseat was produced by Tim Pagnotta and recorded in Los Angeles and London. The album was written when the band was in their teens.

== Release ==
On 26 October 2017, the band released a new single "Permanent Vacation" and announced that their debut LP, Tales from the Backseat, would be released on 12 January 2018. Follow up single "Why Can't We Be Friends?" was selected by Annie Mac at BBC Radio 1 as her Hottest Record in the world which Clash also called it "a crisp, ultra-catchy indie pop jammer."

== Reception ==
=== Critical reception ===
Professional ratings
Review scores
Source	Rating
Clash	7/10
Hotpress Magazine	8/10
The Irish Times	4/5 stars
The Last Mixed Tape	8/10
RTÉ.ie	3.5/5 stars

Tales from the Backseat was met with generally favourable reviews. The Last Mixed Tape praised the album and described it as "a short sharp shock debut that makes great use of every indie-pop trope available." Clash said the album was "brimming with energy and potential" and likened the album's sound to that of The Strokes and the Yeah Yeah Yeahs. RTÉ.ie also gave the album a positive review, with writer Alan Corr concluding, "The spectre of indie landfill rears up here and there but at a thrifty 33 minutes, The Academic have delivered a short, sharp jab to the aural sweet spot."

=== Commercial performance ===
Tales from the Backseat debuted at number 1 on the Irish Albums Chart on its first week of release.

== Track listing ==
Tales from the Backseat track listing
No.	Title	Length
1.	"Permanent Vacation"	3:14
2.	"Bear Claws"	3:33
3.	"Different"	3:13
4.	"I Feel It Too"	3:39
5.	"Bite My Tongue"	3:26
6.	"Fake ID"	2:49
7.	"Northern Boy"	3:58
8.	"Television"	3:35
9.	"Why Can't We Be Friends?"	3:24
10.	"Girlfriends"	3:32
Total length:		34:22

== Charts ==
Chart performance for Tales from the Backseat
Chart (2018)	Peak position
Irish Albums (IRMA)	1
