= Raging (song) =

2016 single by Kygo

Single by Kygo featuring Kodaline

from the album Cloud Nine
- Released: 1 April 2016
- Genre: Folktronica; tropical house
- Length: 3:43 (album version); 3:18 (radio edit)
- Label: Sony
- Songwriters: Mark Williams; Derek Fuhrmann; James Bay; Kyrre Gørvell-Dahll
- Producer: Kygo

Kygo singles chronology
"Coming Over" (2016)	"Raging" (2016)	"Carry Me" (2016)

Kodaline singles chronology
"Ready" (2015)	"Raging" (2016)	"Brother" (2017)

Music video
- "Raging" on YouTube

"Raging" is a 2016 song by Norwegian DJ and record producer Kygo from his debut studio album, Cloud Nine. It was released as the second promotional single from the album on 1 April 2016, becoming later the fifth single from the album. The song features Irish rock band Kodaline. "Raging" also includes writing credits from James Bay.

== Composition ==
"Raging" is a tropical house song written in the key of D♯ minor. It runs at 100 BPM.

== Music video ==
The music video for the song was released to YouTube on 23 May 2016. It was directed by Ariel Elia and produced by Dan Klabin. The video also features a sequel, "I'm in Love" featuring James Vincent McMorrow, which was a promotional single for the album - Cloud Nine.

== In popular culture ==
The song is featured in the soundtrack of EA Sports video game FIFA 17.

== Charts ==
=== Weekly charts ===
Chart (2016)	Peak position
Austria (Ö3 Austria Top 40)	47
Czech Republic Airplay (ČNS IFPI)	8
Czech Republic Singles Digital (ČNS IFPI)	39
France (SNEP)	64
Germany (GfK)	69
Hungary (Rádiós Top 40)	7
Ireland (IRMA)	9
Italy (FIMI)	57
Netherlands (Dutch Top 40)	21
Netherlands (Single Top 100)	26
Norway (VG-lista)	2
Poland Airplay (ZPAV)	28
Portugal (AFP)	56
Scottish Singles Sales (Official Charts)	21
Slovakia Airplay (ČNS IFPI)	12
Slovakia Singles Digital (ČNS IFPI)	37
Sweden (Sverigetopplistan)	6
Switzerland (Schweizer Hitparade)	24
UK Singles (Official Charts)	42
US Hot Dance/Electronic Songs (Billboard)	16

=== Year-end charts ===
Chart (2016)	Position
Hungary (Rádiós Top 40)	24
Netherlands (Single Top 100)	96
Sweden (Sverigetopplistan)	51
Switzerland (Schweizer Hitparade)	93
US Hot Dance/Electronic Songs (Billboard)	53
Chart (2017)	Position
Hungary (Rádiós Top 40)	76

== Certifications ==
Region	Certification	Certified units/sales
Canada (Music Canada)	Gold	40,000^{‡}
Denmark (IFPI Danmark)	Gold	45,000^{‡}
Italy (FIMI)	Platinum	50,000^{‡}
Mexico (AMPROFON)	Platinum	60,000^{‡}
New Zealand (RMNZ)	Gold	15,000^{‡}
Poland (ZPAV)	Gold	25,000^{‡}
United Kingdom (BPI)	Gold	400,000^{‡}
^{‡} Sales+streaming figures based on certification alone.

== Release history ==
Region	Date	Format	Label
Worldwide	1 April 2016	Digital download	Sony
