= Parson James =

American singer and songwriter

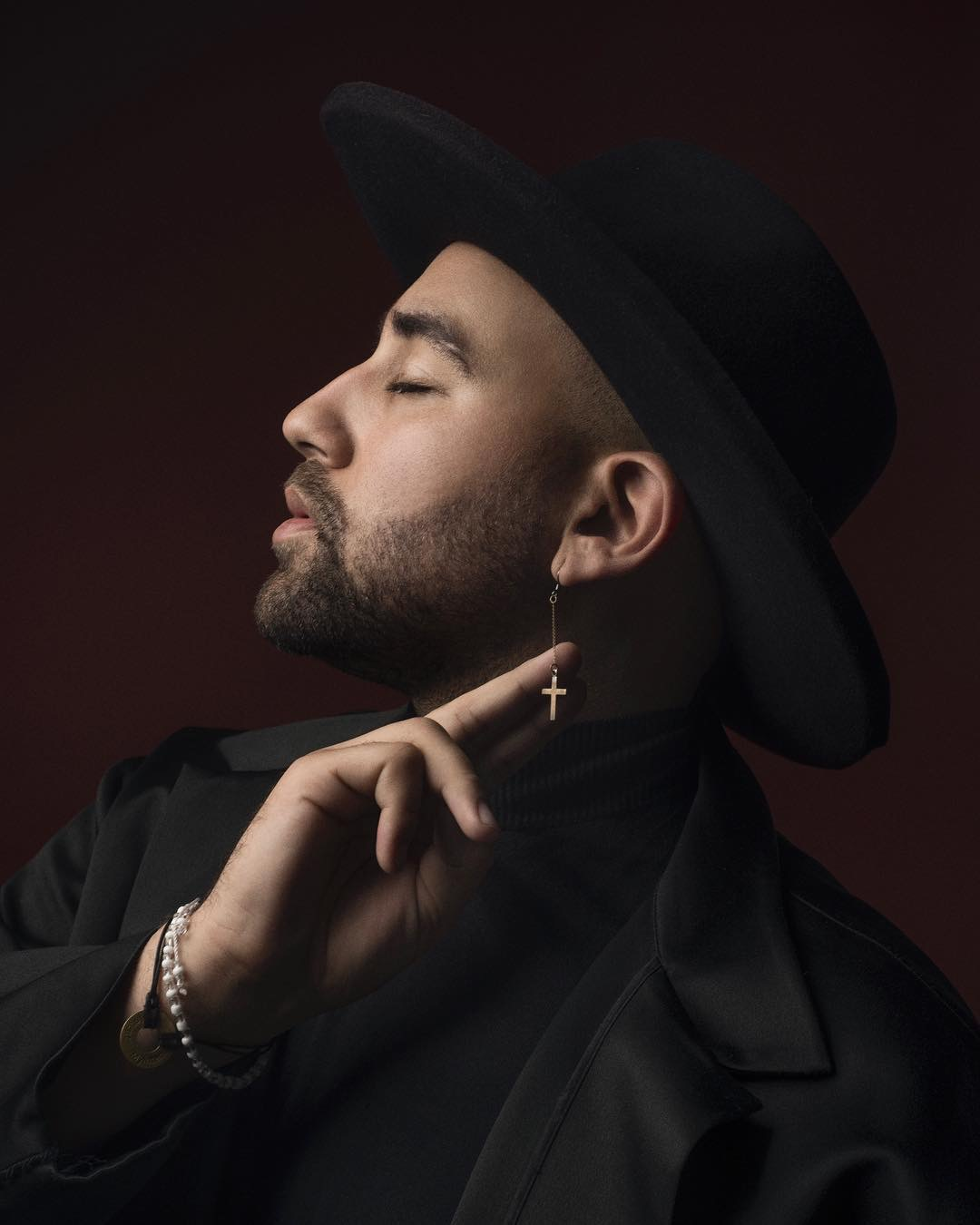
- Born: Ashton Parson; June 7, 1994 (age 32); Cheraw, South Carolina
- Other name: Parson James
- Occupations: Singer; songwriter; model
- Label: RCA
- Website: parsonjamesofficial.com

Parson James (born June 7, 1994) is an American singer and songwriter. He is best known for his single "Stole the Show", a collaboration with Norwegian producer Kygo. The song became a hit in a number of countries as well as receiving certifications in Italy, New Zealand, Norway, and the United Kingdom. He has collaborated with various artists including on the song "Insomnia" by Audien. On February 5, 2016, he released his extended play release The Temple EP on Sony Music with a full studio album due later on RCA Records.

== Biography ==
James was born Ashton Parson in Cheraw of an interracial relationship, with his father being black and his mother white. His mother, just 16, was kicked out of her parents' house because of the relationship. He and his single mother faced hardship in Cheraw, South Carolina, where he was born and raised and where he grew up singing hymns in church. At 17, he decided to move to New York City, partly because he wanted wider possibilities than his conservative hometown would offer to a bi-racial and gay young man.

James signed with RCA Records in early 2015 after the release of his first single, "Stole the Show", a collaboration he co-wrote with Kygo. The song became a hit in a number of countries as well as receiving certifications in Italy, New Zealand, Norway, and the United Kingdom. The video to the song was released at the YouTube Music Awards, with the duo also performing a cover of Tove Lo's single "Habits" on BBC One's Live Lounge.

Parson followed-up with his solo debut, "Sinner Like You", a song produced by Elof Loelv. In addition to releasing his own music under RCA, he has collaborated with additional artists including on the song "Insomnia" by Audien.

On February 5, 2016, he released his extended play release The Temple EP on Sony Music with a full studio album due later in the year on RCA Records. The EP included the title track "Temple", plus "Slow Dance with the Devil", "Sinner Like You", his great hit "Stole the Show" and finally "Waiting Game". James also appeared on Late Night with Seth Meyers performing "Temple" from the EP after having been featured with Kygo in February 2016, performing "Stole the Show" live on The Tonight Show Starring Jimmy Fallon alongside Kygo. The track "Waiting Game" from The Temple EP got huge exposure when Trent Harmon, a contestant in season 15, the last season of the American Idol performed it after a suggestion by judge and mentor Keith Urban. In April 2016, James was featured on the cover and in the pages of Hello Mr., and in November 2016 was picked as "Artist of the Month" by Elvis Duran performing his single "Sad Song" during the NBC's Today show with Kathie Lee and Hoda Kotb.

== Discography ==
=== Extended plays ===
Details	Track list	Peak chart position
Details	Track list	US Heat
The Temple: Released: February 5, 2016; Label: Sony Music; Format: Digital download	1. "Temple" (4:09); 2. "Slow Dance with the Devil" (3:27); 3. "Sinner Like You" (3:50); 4. "Stole the Show" (3:51); 5. "Waiting Game" (3:52)	20

=== Singles ===
==== As lead artist ====
List of singles, with selected chart positions and certifications, showing year released and album name
Title	Year	Album
"Religion"	2014	Non-album single
"Sinner Like You"	2015	The Temple EP
"Stole the Show" (Solo version)	2015	The Temple EP
"Temple"	2015	The Temple EP
"Sad Song"	2016	Non-album singles
"Tennessee Whiskey" (with Stan Walker)	2017	Non-album singles
"If You're Hearing This" (with Hook N Sling & Betty Who)	2017	Non-album singles
"Only You"	2017	Non-album singles
"Minute"	2019	Non-album singles
"Oh Love" (with Wrabel & VINCINT)	2019	Non-album singles
"High Tide, Low Tide"	2020	Non-album singles
"Bigger" (Duet Version) (with Stan Walker)	2020	Non-album singles
"Dirty Laundry" (featuring JoJo)	2021	Non-album singles
"Little Fires"	2023	Non-album singles
"Call Your Friends" (with Flavia)	2023	Non-album singles
"Right Now" (with Vandelux)	2023	Non-album singles
"Let Me Love You" (with Sistek)	2024	Non-album singles
"Love Right Here" (with Emeli Sandé and Troy Miller)	2026	

==== As featured artist ====
List of singles, with selected chart positions and certifications, showing year released and album name
Title	Year	Peak chart positions											Certifications	Album
Title	Year	US Dance	AUS	AUT	FRA	GER	NL	NOR	NZ	SWE	SWI	UK	Certifications	Album
"Stole the Show" (Kygo featuring Parson James)	2015	11	53	2	1	2	3	1	4	1	3	24	IFPI NOR: 3× Platinum; BPI: Silver; RIAA: Platinum	Cloud Nine
"Insomnia" (Audien featuring Parson James)	2015	32	—	—	—	—	—	—	—	—	—	—		Non-album single
"River" (The Knocks featuring Parson James)	2021	—	—	—	—	—	—	—	—	—	—	—		History
"Lonely Tonight" (Sam Feldt featuring Justin Jesso and Parson James)	2025	—	—	—	—	—	—	—	—	—	—	—		Time After Time
"—" denotes a recording that did not chart or was not released.
