= Feels So Good (Show Me Your Love) =

1996 single by Lina Santiago

Single by Lina Santiago

from the album Feels So Good
- Released: June 10, 1996
- Recorded: 1995
- Length: 3:37 (radio edit)
- Label: Groove Nation; Universal
- Songwriter: DJ Juanito
- Producer: DJ Juanito

"Feels So Good (Show Me Your Love)" is a song by American freestyle singer Lina Santiago, released in June 1996 by Groove Nation and Universal, as the first single from her debut and only album, Feels So Good (1996). It is both written and produced by DJ Juanito, and peaked at number 35 on the US Billboard Hot 100 on April 6, 1996 as well as number 18 on the US Cash Box Top 100. The song also reached number six on the Dance Music/Club Play Singles chart.

== Charts ==
Chart (1996)	Peak position
US Billboard Hot 100	35
US Top 40 Mainstream (Billboard)	33
US Rhythmic Top 40 (Billboard)	70
US Hot R&B/Hip-Hop Singles & Tracks (Billboard)	63
US Hot Dance Music/Maxi-Singles Sales (Billboard)	4
US Dance Music/Club Play Singles (Billboard)	6
US Cash Box Top 100	18
