= Sometimes (Kodaline song) =

Single by Kodaline

from the album One Day at a Time
- Released: 6 March 2020
- Length: 3:48
- Label: B-Unique

Kodaline singles chronology
"Wherever You Are" (2020)	"Sometimes" (2020)	"This Must Be Christmas" (2020)

"Sometimes" is a song by Dublin-based alternative rock quartet Kodaline. The song was released on 6 March 2020 as the second single from the band's fourth studio album One Day at a Time. The song peaked at number ninety-four on the Irish Singles Chart.

== Background ==
When talking about the song, Steve Garrigan said, "I wrote this song on tour in Asia last year. I had a really bad day dealing with my own anxiety issues and I let it get the better of me. I started writing the song in my hotel room to help me calm down, music has always helped me in that way. For me, it’s a song about accepting the bad days and trying to stay positive."

== Music video ==
A music video to accompany the release of "Sometimes" was first released onto YouTube on 23 March 2020.

== Charts ==
Chart (2020)	Peak position
Ireland (IRMA)	94
Ireland Airplay (Radiomonitor)	11
Scottish Singles Sales (Official Charts)	76

== Release history ==
Region	Date	Format	Label
United Kingdom	6 March 2020	Digital download; streaming	B-Unique
