= Coming Up for Air (Kodaline album) =

Studio album by Kodaline
- Released: 9 February 2015
- Recorded: 2014
- Genre: Alternative rock, indie rock, indie pop
- Length: 64:21
- Label: B-Unique Records; Sony Music Entertainment
- Producer: Jacknife Lee, Stephen Harris

Kodaline chronology
In a Perfect World (2013)	Coming Up for Air (2015)	I Wouldn't Be (2017)

Singles from Coming Up for Air
- 1. "Honest" Released: 8 December 2014; 2. "The One" Released: 6 February 2015; 3. "Ready" Released: 15 May 2015

Coming Up for Air is the second studio album by Irish rock band Kodaline. It was released on 9 February 2015 by Sony Music Entertainment.

== Critical reception ==
Professional ratings
Aggregate scores
Source	Rating
Metacritic	51/100
Review scores
Source	Rating
The Guardian	3/5 stars
Q	3/5 stars
DIY	2/5 stars
The Observer	1/5 stars

Coming Up For Air received generally mixed reviews from critics: it has a score of 51 out of 100 on Metacritic, based on 7 reviews, which indicates "mixed or average reviews".

== Singles ==
"Honest" was released as the first single from the album on 8 December 2014. The song peaked at number 7 in Ireland and number 39 in the United Kingdom. "The One" was released as the second single from the album on 6 February 2015. The song peaked at number 29 in Ireland and number 27 in the United Kingdom. "Ready" was released as the third single from the album on 15 May 2015.

== Track listing ==
No.	Title	Writer(s)	Length
1.	"Honest"	Stephen Garrigan, Mark Prendergast, Vincent May, Jacknife Lee	3:38
2.	"The One"	Garrigan, Prendergast, May, Lee	3:52
3.	"Autopilot"	Garrigan, Prendergast, May	4:18
4.	"Human Again"	Garrigan, Prendergast, May, Lee	3:47
5.	"Unclear"	Garrigan, Prendergast, May	4:25
6.	"Coming Alive"	Garrigan, Prendergast, May	4:16
7.	"Lost"	Garrigan, Prendergast, May	3:35
8.	"Ready"	Garrigan, Prendergast, May	3:53
9.	"Better"	Garrigan, Prendergast, May	3:34
10.	"Everything Works Out in the End"	Garrigan, Prendergast, May	3:37
11.	"Play The Game"	Garrigan, Prendergast, May, Lee	3:54
12.	"Love Will Set You Free"	Garrigan, Prendergast, May, Johnny McDaid	4:20

Coming Up For Air (Deluxe edition)
No.	Title	Writer(s)	Length
13.	"Caught in the Middle"	Stephen Garrigan, Mark Prendergast, Vincent May	4:36
14.	"War"	Stephen Garrigan, Mark Prendergast, Vincent May	3:31
15.	"Moving On"	Stephen Garrigan, Mark Prendergast, Vincent May	4:25
16.	"Honest" (Acoustic)	Stephen Garrigan, Mark Prendergast, Vincent May, Jacknife Lee	4:40

== Charts ==
=== Weekly charts ===
Chart (2015)	Peak position
Australian Albums (ARIA)	37
Belgian Albums (Ultratop Flanders)	44
Belgian Albums (Ultratop Wallonia)	110
Dutch Albums (Album Top 100)	13
French Albums (SNEP)	162
Irish Albums (IRMA)	1
New Zealand Albums (RMNZ)	23
Scottish Albums (OCC)	3
Spanish Albums (PROMUSICAE)	86
Swiss Albums (Schweizer Hitparade)	4
UK Albums (OCC)	4
US Billboard 200	113

=== Year-end charts ===
Chart (2015)	Position
Irish Albums (IRMA)	8
UK Albums (OCC)	61

=== Certifications ===
Region	Certification	Certified units/sales
United Kingdom (BPI)	Gold	110,446

== Release history ==
Region	Date	Format	Label
Germany	6 February 2015	Digital download, CD	Sony Music Entertainment
Ireland	6 February 2015	Digital download, CD	Sony Music Entertainment
Netherlands	6 February 2015	Digital download, CD	Sony Music Entertainment
United Kingdom	9 February 2015	Digital download, CD	Sony Music Entertainment
United States	10 February 2015	Digital download, CD	RCA Records
