= Head Held High =

Single by Kodaline

from the album Politics of Living
- Released: 24 August 2018
- Recorded: 2017
- Genre: Indie folk • indie pop
- Length: 3:34
- Label: B-Unique
- Songwriters: Kodaline; Johnny McDaid; Jonny Coffer; Liam O'Donnell
- Producers: Harris; Jonny Coffer

Kodaline singles chronology
"Worth It" (2018)	"Head Held High" (2018)	"Wherever You Are" (2020)

"Head Held High" is a song by Dublin-based alternative rock quartet Kodaline. The song was released on 24 August 2018 as the fifth single from the band's third studio album, Politics of Living (2018). The song peaked at number sixty-eight on the Irish Singles Chart.

== Music video ==
A music video to accompany the release of "Head Held High" was first released onto YouTube on 24 August 2018.

== Charts ==
Chart (2018)	Peak position
Ireland (IRMA)	68

== Release history ==
Region	Date	Format	Label
United Kingdom	24 August 2018	Digital download	B-Unique

== Other ==
Also Head Held High known as a graphic novel about time traveler and parallel universe jumper by Airat Asadullin, published on Acomics and NECjAR.
