= Feels So Good (Lina Santiago album) =

1996 studio album by Lina Santiago

Studio album by Lina Santiago
- Released: August 27, 1996
- Genre: Freestyle
- Length: 57:22
- Label: Uptown
- Producer: DJ Juanito

Singles from Feels So Good
- 1. "Feels So Good (Show Me Your Love)" Released: June 10, 1996; 2. "Just Because I Love You" Released: July 23, 1996; 3. "Dale Que Dale" Released: 1996

Feels So Good is the only album by American freestyle singer Lina Santiago, released August 27, 1996 via Uptown Records. The album did not chart in the United States; but the lead and second singles "Feels So Good (Show Me Your Love)" and "Just Because I Love You" peaked at number 35 and number 78 on the Billboard Hot 100 in 1996.

== Track listing ==
No.	Title	Writer(s)	Length
1.	"Dale Que Dale"	Bandy; Juanito	4:29
2.	"Just Because I Love You"	Goldmark; Mueller	4:35
3.	"Feels So Good (Show Me Your Love)"	Juanito	3:34
4.	"Everywhere I Go"	Smith; Stober	4:40
5.	"Must Be the Right Thing to Do"	Juanito; Kline	3:51
6.	"Cutie Pie" (One Way cover (featuring Delinquent Habits))	Dudley; Hudson; Meadows; Morgan; Roberson	4:14
7.	"Deep Inside of Me"	Juanito	4:55
8.	"Thank God for You"	Goldmark; Juanito; Kipner	4:19
9.	"Always in My Heart"	Dermer	4:29
10.	"Where is My Angel"	Warren	5:44
11.	"We'll Stand Together"	Goffin; Kline	4:25
12.	"Yo Se Que Té Amo"		3:25
13.	"Por Donde Yo Voy"		4:42
Total length:			57:22
