= Feel Good (Syn Cole song) =

2016 song by Syn Cole

Single by Syn Cole

from the album NCS: The Best of 2016
- Released: February 27, 2016
- Genre: Future house

Syn Cole singles chronology
"May" (2015)	"Feel Good" (2016)	"The Daze" (2016)

Music video
- "Feel Good" on YouTube

"Feel Good" is a song by Estonian DJ Syn Cole. The song was released as a digital download on February 27, 2016, through NoCopyrightSounds.

== Overview ==
In 2016, NoCopyrightSounds released this song, which has over 150 million views on the NCS YouTube channel, and in 2017, Sony released a new version of "Feel Good", "Got the Feeling", featuring kirstin from Pentatonix. The song reached No. 2 on the Estonian airplay chart.

== Charts ==
Chart (2016)	Peak position
Estonia (Raadio Uuno)	2
