= Politics of Living =

2018 album by Kodaline

Studio album by Kodaline
- Released: 28 September 2018
- Genre: Indie pop • pop rock • pop • dance-pop • electropop
- Length: 44:28
- Label: B-Unique; Sony
- Producer: Steve Mac; Johnny McDaid; Max Marlow; Will Reynolds; Graham Archer; Stephen Harris; Jonny Coffer; Jonas Jeberg; Dave Emery; Serban Ghenea; Two Inch Punch

Kodaline chronology
I Wouldn't Be (2017)	Politics of Living (2018)	One Day at a Time (2020)

Singles from Politics of Living
- 1. "Brother" Released: 23 June 2017; 2. "Follow Your Fire" Released: 23 March 2018; 3. "Shed a Tear" Released: 15 June 2018; 4. "Worth It" Released: 20 July 2018; 5. "Head Held High" Released: 24 August 2018

Politics of Living is the third studio album by the Irish rock band Kodaline. It was released on 28 September 2018 through labels B-Unique Records and Sony Music UK. It features prominent production collaborations with musicians such as Steve Mac, Stephen Harris, and Jonny Coffer. Five singles were issued from the album: "Brother", "Follow Your Fire", "Shed a Tear", "Worth It", and "Head Held High". Commercially, Politics of Living was a success within Europe. The album peaked at number one on the Irish Albums Chart, becoming Kodaline's third number one album, and at 15 on the UK Albums Chart.

== Track listing ==
No.	Title	Writer(s)	Producer(s)	Length
1.	"Follow Your Fire"	Steve Garrigan; Johnny McDaid; Steve Mac	Mac	3:58
2.	"Hide and Seek"	Kodaline; McDaid; Corey Sanders; Will Reynolds	McDaid; Max Marlow; Reynolds; Graham Archer	3:46
3.	"Angel"	Kodaline	Stephen Harris	3:57
4.	"Worth It"	Kodaline; Wayne Hector	Harris; Jonny Coffer	4:01
5.	"Shed a Tear"	Kodaline; Dave Gibson; Jonas Jeberg; Neil Ormandy	Harris; Jeberg; Dave Emery	3:55
6.	"Head Held High"	Kodaline; McDaid; Coffer; Liam O'Donnell	Harris; Coffer	3:34
7.	"Born Again"	Garrigan; McDaid; Mac; Hector	Mac; Serban Ghenea	3:34
8.	"I Wouldn't Be"	Kodaline	Harris	3:41
9.	"Don't Come Around"	Kodaline; Coffer; Hector	Coffer	3:07
10.	"Brother"	Kodaline; Sanders; Alex Davies; Jon Maguire	Harris; Two Inch Punch	3:23
11.	"Hell Froze Over"	Kodaline; McDaid; Marlow	McDaid; Marlow; Reynolds; Archer	3:45
12.	"Temple Bar"	Kodaline; Coffer; Hector	Coffer	3:47
Total length:				44:28

Japanese edition bonus tracks
No.	Title	Writer(s)	Producer(s)	Length
13.	"Ready to Change"	Kodaline; Hector	Harris; Emery	3:56
14.	"The Riddle"	Kodaline	Harris	4:12
15.	"Blood and Bones"	Kodaline	Harris	3:54
Total length:				56:39

== Charts ==
Chart (2017)	Peak position
Belgian Albums (Ultratop Flanders)	49
Belgian Albums (Ultratop Wallonia)	101
Irish Albums (OCC)	1
Dutch Albums (Album Top 100)	86
Scottish Albums (OCC)	10
Spanish Albums (Promusicae)	91
Swiss Albums (Schweizer Hitparade)	11
UK Albums (OCC)	15
UK Album Downloads (OCC)	11

== See also ==
- List of number-one albums of 2018 (Ireland)
