= The Academic =

Irish indie rock band

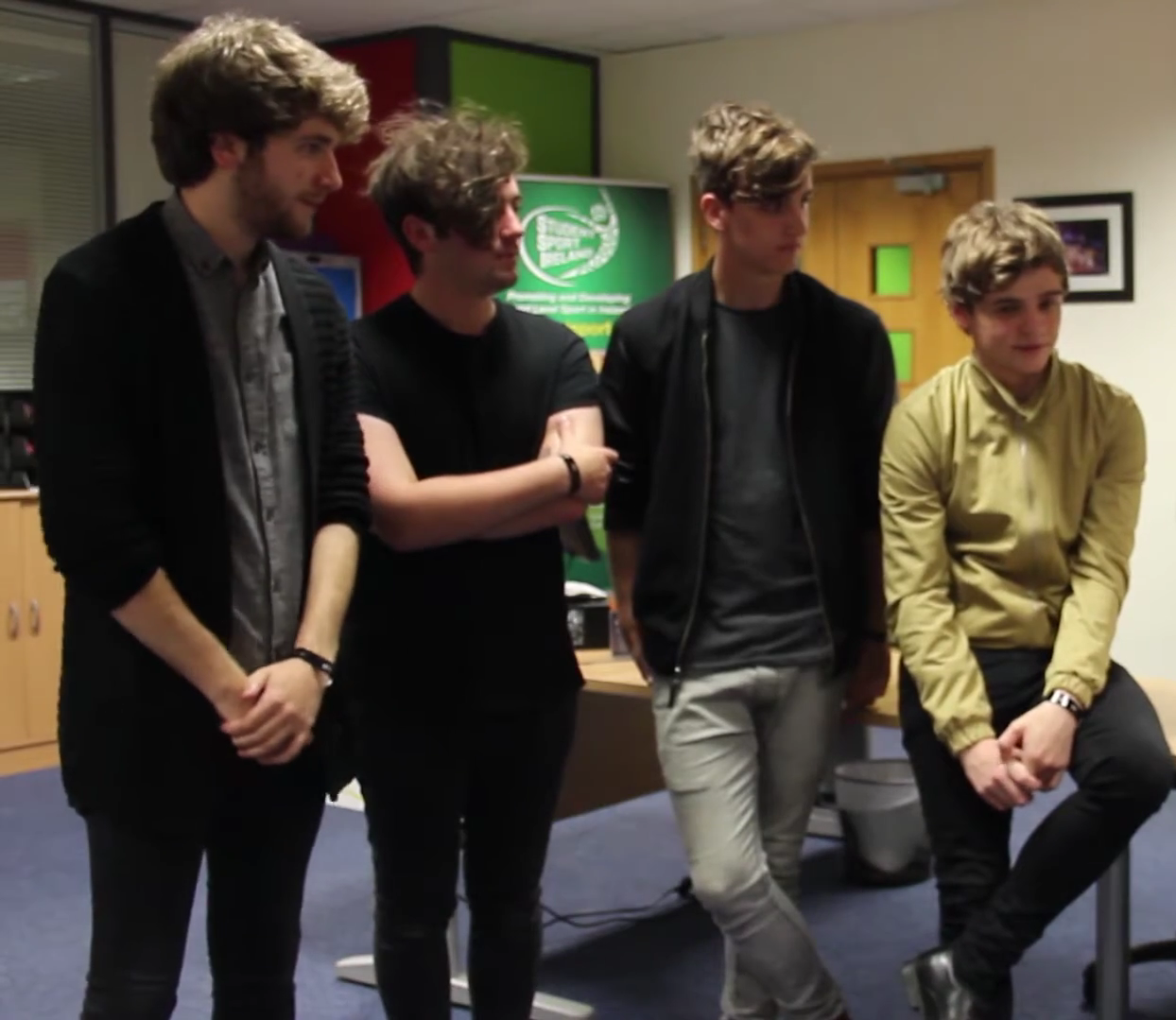
- The Academic in 2016

Background information
- Origin: Killucan, County Westmeath, Ireland
- Genres: Alternative rock, indie rock, indie pop
- Years active: 2013–present
- Labels: Room 6 Records; Downtown; Capitol
- Members: Craig Fitzgerald; Dean Gavin; Matthew Murtagh; Stephen Murtagh
- Website: theacademic.net

The Academic are an Irish indie rock band from Killucan, County Westmeath. The band consists of Craig Fitzgerald, Dean Gavin, and brothers Matthew and Stephen Murtagh.

Their debut studio album, Tales from the Backseat, was released in January 2018, entering the Irish Albums Chart at number one. The album was nominated for Album of the Year at the Choice Music Prize in January 2019. Their second studio album, Sitting Pretty, was released on 10 February 2023 and entered the official Irish Albums Chart at number one.

== History ==
=== Formation and early years (2015–2016) ===
The Academic were formed, when Fitzgerald, Gavin and the Murtagh brothers were all attending St Joseph's Secondary School, Rochfortbridge.

Such was the reaction to the release of their debut EP, Loose Friends, in October 2015, that the band sold out their first show at Dublin venue Vicar Street.

In January 2016, the band were selected by RTÉ 2FM to represent Ireland at Eurosonic Noorderslag in Groningen, which resulted in numerous festival bookings and extensive radio airplay across Europe that year.

=== Tales from the Backseat (2017–2019) ===
The band garnered further media interest in July 2017 with the release of "Bear Claws", an anthemic track which was likened in style to The Strokes. The track received further attention after the premiere of their first-of-a-kind and world's first live looper music video. The video, which was performed live on a Facebook video stream, utilized the delay in the stream to create a musical loop, to which they gradually added vocals and instruments. It was a viral hit and reached over 1 million views on YouTube in 48 hours.

The band announced on 26 October 2017 that their debut LP, Tales from the Backseat, would be released on 12 January 2018. The album was released to critical acclaim, entering the Irish Albums Chart at number one.

Their biggest headline show to date took place at the Iveagh Gardens, Dublin, on 20 July 2018, before they embarked upon a US, European, UK and Ireland tour for the autumn of 2018.

The album was nominated for Album of the Year at the Choice Music Prize in January 2019.

=== Signing to Capitol and Sitting Pretty (2020–present) ===
The band signed to Capitol Records in May 2020. They released their second album, Sitting Pretty, on 10 February 2023. It debuted atop the Irish Albums Chart on 17 February 2023.

Upon finishing their U.S. headliner tour to promote the album, The Academic were one of the openers for English singer-songwriter Louis Tomlinson on the North American, UK and European leg of his Faith in the Future World Tour. In April, October and November 2023, they were among several local acts invited as guest performers for Joe Biden's stop in Ballina on the night of the 15th as part of his presidential trip in his ancestral land of County Mayo.

== Artistry ==
According to a 2018 interview with The Irish Independent, The Academic were inspired by 2000s retro-rock, The Strokes being an "especially formative influence". They also listened to Yeah Yeah Yeahs and Vampire Weekend for their first album, and then Talking Heads, New Order, and Elvis Costello for their second album.

== Members ==
- Craig Fitzgerald – lead vocals, guitar
- Matthew Murtagh – guitar, backing vocals
- Stephen Murtagh – bass, backing vocals
- Dean Gavin – drums, backing vocals

== Discography ==
=== Albums ===
List of albums, with selected details and peak chart positions
Title	Album details	Peak chart positions
Title	Album details	IRE
Tales from the Backseat	Released: 12 January 2018; Label: Room 6, Downtown	1
Sitting Pretty	Released: 10 February 2023; Label: Capitol	1

=== Extended plays ===
List of EPs, with selected details and peak chart positions
Title	EP details	Peak chart positions
Title	EP details	IRE
Loose Friends	Released: 12 January 2018	—
Acting My Age	Released: 10 July 2020	6
Community Spirit	Released: 16 July 2021	—

=== Singles ===
List of singles, with selected chart positions
Title	Year	Peak chart positions	Album
Title	Year	IRE	Album
"Girlfriends"	2013	—	Non-album single
"Different"	2015	67	Loose Friends EP
"Northern Boy"	2015	—	Loose Friends EP
"Mixtape 2003"	2016	—	Non-album single
"Bear Claws"	2017	—	Tales from the Backseat
"Permanent Vacation"	2017	—	Tales from the Backseat
"Why Can't We Be Friends?"	2017	—	Tales from the Backseat
"Bite My Tongue"	2017	—	Tales from the Backseat
"Fake ID"	2017	—	Tales from the Backseat
"Superlike"	2019	—	Non-album singles
"Aftertaste"	2019	—	Non-album singles
"Anything Could Happen"	2020	—	Acting My Age EP
"Kids (Don't End Up Like Me)"	2021	—	Community Spirit EP
"Not Your Summer"	2021	—	Community Spirit EP
"Don't Take It Personally"	2022	—	Sitting Pretty
"Pushing Up Daisies"	2022	—	Sitting Pretty
"Homesick"	2022	—	Sitting Pretty
"My Very Best"	2023	—	Sitting Pretty
"Easy on the Eyes"	2024	—	Non-album singles
"Bye Bye Baby"	2025	—	Non-album singles
"Figure It Out"	2026	—	Non-album singles
