= Feel Good (G-Unit song) =

Song by G-Unit
- Released: November 1, 2007
- Recorded: 2007
- Genre: East Coast hip hop, gangsta rap, hardcore hip hop
- Label: G-Unit, Interscope
- Songwriters: Christopher Lloyd, Curtis Jackson, David Brown, Marvin Bernard
- Producer: Teddy Becks

"Feel Good" was announced as the second promo single from G-Unit's second studio album, Terminate on Sight which was produced by Teddy Becks.

== Background ==
The track premiered on November 1, 2007 and will be included on an upcoming G-Unit album

When asked about the song in an interview, 50 Cent said:

We're going back to the basic concept of the mixtape and creating a new vibe. We are creating a new sound for them to rock in the street. We plan for "Feel Good" to do for G-Unit what "You Should Be Here" did for me. Implant us in the future.

== Music video ==
The video was released to the internet first because of the graphical content.

A second video for the track was released.
