= Wherever You Are (Kodaline song) =

Single by Kodaline

from the album One Day at a Time
- Released: 10 January 2020
- Recorded: 2019
- Genre: Pop, indie pop
- Length: 3:05
- Label: B-Unique

Kodaline singles chronology
"Head Held High" (2018)	"Wherever You Are" (2020)	"Sometimes" (2020)

"Wherever You Are" is a song by Dublin-based alternative rock quartet Kodaline. The song was released on 10 January 2020 as the lead single from the band's fourth studio album One Day at a Time. The song peaked at number sixty-six on the Irish Singles Chart.

== Background ==
When talking about the song, Steve Garrigan said, "Wherever You Are is about loved ones staying in your heart and mind even when they’re not with you. I wrote it specifically for my girlfriend as due to being away on tour all the time, we never really get to see each other."

== Music video ==
A music video to accompany the release of "Wherever You Are" was first released onto YouTube on 15 January 2020.

== Charts ==
Chart (2020)	Peak position
Ireland (IRMA)	66
Scotland Singles (OCC)	76

== Release history ==
Region	Date	Format	Label
United Kingdom	10 January 2020	Digital download; streaming	B-Unique
