= Love Like This (Kodaline song) =

Single by Kodaline

from the album In a Perfect World
- Released: 31 May 2013
- Recorded: 2012
- Genre: Indie folk
- Length: 3:36
- Label: B-Unique
- Songwriter(s): Steve Garrigan; Mark Prendergrast; Vincent May

Kodaline singles chronology
"High Hopes" (2013)	"Love Like This" (2013)	"Brand New Day" (2013)

"Love Like This" is a song by Dublin-based alternative rock quartet Kodaline. The song was released as a digital download on 31 May 2013, as the second single from their debut studio album In a Perfect World (2013). The song peaked at number 8 on the Irish Singles Chart and number 22 on the UK Singles Chart.

== Track listing ==
Digital download – EP
No.	Title	Length
1.	"Love Like This"	3:36
2.	"What It Is"	3:49
3.	"Midnight"	4:18
4.	"Love Like This" (Acoustic)	4:01

== Chart performance ==
=== Weekly charts ===
Chart (2013)	Peak position
Belgium (Ultratip Bubbling Under Flanders)	94
Ireland (IRMA)	8
Scotland (OCC)	19
UK Singles (OCC)	22

== Certifications ==
Region	Certification	Certified units/sales
United Kingdom (BPI)	Silver	200,000^{‡}
^{‡} Sales+streaming figures based on certification alone.

== Release history ==
Region	Date	Format	Label
Ireland	31 May 2013	Digital download	B-Unique
United Kingdom	31 May 2013	Digital download	B-Unique
