= Feeling Good (disambiguation) =

"Feeling Good" is a 1964 song written by Anthony Newley and Leslie Bricusse for the musical The Roar of the Greasepaint—the Smell of the Crowd, recorded by many artists.

Feeling Good or Feelin' Good may also refer to:

== Music ==
=== Albums ===
- Feelin' Good (David Ruffin album), 1969
- Feelin' Good (Gerry Mulligan album), 1965
- Feelin' Good (Lena Horne album), 1965
- Feelin' Good (Nightmares on Wax album), 2013
- Feelin' Good (Sarah Vaughan album), 1972
- Feelin' Good (The Three Sounds album), 1960
- Feeling Good (Art Blakey album), 1986
- Feeling Good (Julie London album), 1965
- Feeling Good (Roy Ayers album), 1982

=== Songs ===
- "Feeling Good", by J. B. Lenoir, 1970
- "Feelin' Good" (Faithless song), 2010
- "Hyper Music" / "Feeling Good", by Muse, including a cover of the Newley/Bricusse song, 2001
- "Feeling Good", by Fitz and the Tantrums from the deluxe edition of Let Yourself Free, 2023
- "Feeling Good", by Infinity, 1998
- "Feeling Good", by Sofi Tukker from Birds of Prey, 2020
- "Feeling Good", by Avicii, 2015

== Other uses ==
- Feeling Good: The New Mood Therapy, a 1980 book by David D. Burns
- Feeling Good (En pleine forme), a 2010 short film directed by Pierre Étaix
- Feeling Good, a 1974–1975 public TV series hosted by Dick Cavett
- "Feeling Good", an episode of Zoboomafoo

== See also ==
- Feel Good (disambiguation)
- Feels So Good (disambiguation)
