= In a Perfect World (Kodaline album) =

Studio album by Kodaline
- Released: 14 June 2013
- Recorded: 2012
- Genres: Indie rock, indie folk, indie pop, alternative rock
- Length: 44:09
- Label: B-Unique/RCA Victor

Kodaline chronology
Love Like This (2013)	In a Perfect World (2013)	Coming Up for Air (2015)

Singles from In a Perfect World
- 1. "High Hopes" Released: 15 March 2013; 2. "Love Like This" Released: 31 May 2013; 3. "Brand New Day" Released: 23 August 2013; 4. "All I Want" Released: 8 October 2013; 5. "One Day" Released: 6 February 2014

In a Perfect World is the debut studio album by Irish rock band Kodaline. The album was released in Ireland on 14 June 2013 and includes the singles "High Hopes" and "Love Like This". On 20 June 2013 the album entered the Irish Albums Chart at number 1.

== Critical reception ==
Professional ratings
Aggregate scores
Source	Rating
Metacritic	47/100
Review scores
Source	Rating
Clash	8/10
Consequence of Sound	3.5/5 stars
DIY	3/5 stars
The Independent	3/5 stars
The Irish Times	2/5 stars
The Guardian	3/5 stars
musicOMH	3.5/5 stars
The Observer	2/5 stars
PopMatters	2/10
Q	1/5 stars

In A Perfect World received generally mixed reviews from critics. The album currently has a score of 47 out of 100 on aggregate review site Metacritic, based on 9 reviews, indicating "mixed or average reviews".

Lewis Corner of Digital Spy gave the album a mixed review, saying that "Each track nods to the album's namesake by being acutely aware of unobtainable aspirations, but accepting the stark reality nonetheless. [...] In A Perfect World is packed with enough heart and soul to make it an enjoyable debut." Caroline Sullivan of The Guardian also gave the album a mixed review stating "Kodaline have already mastered the craft of piling chorus upon unshakable chorus. Most of these 11 songs contain a killer hook, such as the one that transforms High Hopes from wobbly-lipped ballad to hair-tearing tearjerker. [...] All told, there's a lot of bodice-ripping emotion to take in, and it's this, rather than the lack of original ideas, that makes In a Perfect World hard to take in large doses."

Ally Carnwath of The Observer gave the album 2 stars out of 5, and felt "That for all their stadium uplift and notionally anthemic choruses, they never deliver a hook or melodic sucker punch that really floors you." Lauren Murphy of The Irish Times gave a similar review, saying "Kodaline are a bit drab...It sounds like [they] are more focused on ticking boxes in order to appeal to their target audience, than on blazing their own trail by attempting something original." Bevis Man from DIY gave a negative review, saying "Let’s be frank here, what this band needs is a punch in the face and to grow some balls. It’s hard not to imagine the band, all still in their 20s, writing the album wistfully looking out of a window and feeling incredibly sorry for themselves." Q Magazine were highly critical of the album, calling it "Entirely meritless", and awarded 1 star out of 5.

== Singles ==
- "High Hopes" was released as the single from the album on 15 March 2013. The song has peaked to number 1 on the Irish Singles Chart and number 16 on the UK Singles Chart and 13 in Scotland, the song has also charted in Belgium and the Netherlands.
- "Love Like This" was released as the second single from the album on 31 May 2013. The song has peaked to number 8 on the Irish Singles Chart and number 22 on the UK Singles Chart and 19 in Scotland.
- "Brand New Day" was released as the third single from the album on 23 August 2013. The song has peaked to number 29 on the Irish Singles Chart and number 75 on the UK Singles Chart.

== Track listing ==
All tracks are written by Steve Garrigan, Mark Prendergast & Vinny May

No.	Title	Length
1.	"One Day"	4:15
2.	"All I Want"	5:05
3.	"Love Like This"	3:36
4.	"High Hopes"	3:50
5.	"Brand New Day"	3:25
6.	"After the Fall"	3:35
7.	"Big Bad World"	4:21
8.	"All Comes Down"	4:55
9.	"Talk"	4:28
10.	"Pray"	3:33
11.	"Way Back When"	3:26

Deluxe edition DVD
No.	Title	Length
1.	"Lose Your Mind (Live at the Button Factory)"	5:30
2.	"High Hopes (Live at the Button Factory)"	4:01
3.	"Love Like This (Live at the Button Factory)"	3:43
4.	"All Comes Down (Live at the Button Factory)"	5:27
5.	"All I Want (Live at the Button Factory)"	5:54
6.	"The Answer (Live at the Button Factory)"	4:01

iTunes bonus tracks
No.	Title	Length
12.	"The Answer"	3:41
13.	"Perfect World"	2:52
14.	"Lose Your Mind"	4:45
15.	"Latch" (Cover)	3:37
16.	"All I Want" (Acoustic Live video)	5:39
17.	"High Hopes" (Music video)	4:09

== Personnel ==
- Steve Garrigan - lead vocals, rhythm guitar, harmonica, keyboards
- Mark Prendergast - lead guitar, backing vocals, keyboards
- Vinny May - drums, percussion, backing vocals
- Jason Boland - bass guitar, backing vocals

== Charts ==
=== Weekly charts ===
Chart (2013–14)	Peak position
Australian Albums (ARIA)	24
Belgian Albums (Ultratop Flanders)	44
Belgian Albums (Ultratop Wallonia)	79
Dutch Albums (Album Top 100)	8
Irish Albums (IRMA)	1
Scottish Albums (Official Charts)	2
Swiss Albums (Schweizer Hitparade)	8
UK Albums (Official Charts)	3
US Billboard 200	89
US Top Alternative Albums (Billboard)	16
US Top Rock Albums (Billboard)	22
US Heatseekers Albums (Billboard)	7
US Independent Albums (Billboard)	19

=== Year-end charts ===
Chart (2013)	Position
Irish Albums (IRMA)	6
UK Albums Chart	65
Chart (2014)	Position
Irish Albums (IRMA)	10
UK Albums Chart	90

== Certifications ==
Region	Certification	Certified units/sales
Canada (Music Canada)	Gold	40,000^{‡}
Ireland (IRMA)	2× Platinum	30,000^{^}
New Zealand (RMNZ)	Platinum	15,000^{‡}
Poland (ZPAV)	Gold	10,000^{‡}
Switzerland (IFPI Switzerland)	Gold	10,000^{^}
United Kingdom (BPI)	Platinum	288,855
^{^} Shipments figures based on certification alone.^{‡} Sales+streaming figures based on certification alone.

== Release history ==
Region	Date	Format	Label
Ireland	14 June 2013	Digital download, CD	B-Unique
