= High Hopes (Kodaline song) =

Single by Kodaline

from the album In a Perfect World
- Released: 15 March 2013
- Recorded: 2012
- Genre: Indie rock, indie folk
- Length: 3:51
- Label: B-Unique
- Songwriter(s): Steve Garrigan; Mark Prendergast; Vincent May
- Producer(s): Stephen Harris

Kodaline singles chronology
"Give Me a Minute" (2007)	"High Hopes" (2013)	"Love like This" (2013)

"High Hopes" is a song by Dublin-based alternative rock quartet Kodaline. The song was released as a digital download on 15 March 2013, as the lead single from their debut studio album In a Perfect World (2013). The song reached number one on the Irish Singles Chart, their second overall number one single in Ireland after "Give Me a Minute" in 2007 as 21 Demands. It was featured in a trailer for the film Love, Rosie.

== Music video ==
A music video to accompany the release of "High Hopes" was first released onto YouTube on 23 January 2013 at a total length of four minutes and ten seconds and stars Irish actors Liam Cunningham and Niamh Large.

The video starts off with a man in his car ready to gas himself to death. As he sits inside his car, a woman with a wedding dress runs down a hill being chased by a man she has presumably just left at the altar. As the abandoned groom man watches from afar, the suicidal man removes the hose from his exhaust pipe and helps the woman escape in his car. After the successful escape, the depressed man drives the bride to his house. They become closer and eventually fall in love. While out for a walk, the man she presumably left at the altar appears suddenly and shoots them both. The man crawls bleeding toward his lover and grasps her hand while the screen fades to black. The man wakes up in hospital, and it appears he is the only one who has survived the shooting. But as he sits looking forlornly out the hospital window, his love appears and embraces him from behind.

== Track listing ==
Digital download - EP
No.	Title	Length
1.	"High Hopes"	3:51
2.	"The Answer"	3:41
3.	"All My Friends"	5:26
4.	"All I Want" (Everything Everything Remix)	4:57

== Chart performance ==
On 21 March 2013 the song entered the Irish Singles Chart at number 1. On 24 March 2013 the song entered the UK Singles Chart at number 16, their first top 20 UK single. The song has also peaked to number 13 on the Scottish Singles Chart.

=== Weekly charts ===
Chart (2013)	Peak position
Australia (ARIA)	23
Belgium (Ultratip Bubbling Under Flanders)	78
Ireland (IRMA)	1
Netherlands (Single Top 100)	86
Scotland (OCC)	13
Switzerland (Schweizer Hitparade)	38
UK Singles (OCC)	16

=== Year-end charts ===
Chart (2013)	Position
UK Singles (Official Charts Company)	178

== Certifications ==
Region	Certification	Certified units/sales
Australia (ARIA)	Gold	35,000^{^}
Germany (BVMI)	Gold	150,000^{‡}
New Zealand (RMNZ)	Gold	15,000^{‡}
United Kingdom (BPI)	Gold	400,000^{‡}
^{^} Shipments figures based on certification alone.^{‡} Sales+streaming figures based on certification alone.

== Release history ==
Region	Date	Format	Label
Ireland	15 March 2013	Digital download	B-Unique
United Kingdom	15 March 2013	Digital download	B-Unique
