= All I Want (Kodaline song) =

Single by Kodaline

from the album In a Perfect World
- Released: 8 October 2013
- Recorded: 2012
- Genre: Alternative rock, folk rock
- Length: 5:05
- Label: B-Unique
- Songwriters: Steve Garrigan; James Flannigan; Vincent May; Mark Prendergast
- Producer: Stephen Harris

Kodaline singles chronology
"Brand New Day (Kodaline song) Brand New Day" (2013)	"All I Want" (2013)	"One Day" (2014)

Music video
- "All I Want" (Part 1) on YouTube

Music video
- "All I Want" (Part 2) on YouTube

"All I Want" is a song by Dublin-based alternative rock quartet Kodaline taken from their 2013 album In a Perfect World. It was released as the fourth single from the album, topping at #15 on the Irish Singles Chart and #67 on the UK Singles Chart. As of March 25, 2025, the song has amassed 1.25 billion streams on Spotify.

== Music video ==
The music video for the song, directed by Stevie Russell, was released in two separate parts.

Oliver, who has a deformed face, works for a company and is attracted to Mandy, one of his co-workers; however, she is cautious about developing any relationship with him because of his deformity. In the Part 1 video, three co-workers bully Oliver, and they later harass Mandy, but Oliver stands up for her, fighting them off. Mandy warms up to him because he defended her against the bullying co-workers. In the Part 2 video, Oliver forgets to wear his tie while going to work. While getting his tie, his dog, Digby, slips through the open door and gets lost. Digby wanders the streets and passes by a street band (Kodaline) performing. Oliver discovers Digby's disappearance when he returns home, and he immediately goes to search for Digby, prints posters at work, and Mandy lends him her bike to help him distribute them throughout the community. He eventually finds Digby on a farm outside his community.

The director of the two videos, Stevie Russell, plays the main character, Oliver, with his love interest, Mandy, played by Irish actress Amy De Bhrún. James Cosgrave, Tristan McConnell, and Ciaran O'Grady play the bullies.

== Use in other media ==
The song was featured in The Fault in Our Stars movie soundtrack as well as in the pilot of the E! television show The Royals.

It also featured in "Remember The Time," the second episode of the ninth season of Grey's Anatomy, during Meredith's voice-mail to Cristina.

The fifth season of The Vampire Diaries also used the song.

Google used a version of the song in their Zeitgeist video released in December 2012.

The song was featured for Turner Classic Movies year-end tribute for 2014, "TCM Remembers," which memorialized all of the entertainment personnel who died during the year.

The song was also used in the 2016 film Grimsby.

The "In Memorium" video of the 2021 Screen Actors Guild Awards featured the song.

In September 2021, the song served as the victorious piece for Jacob (Jake) Thomsen (Calinoda) on the American music competition television series "Alter Ego," broadcast on Fox.

== Weekly charts ==
Chart (2014)	Peak position
Belgium (Ultratip Bubbling Under Flanders)	57
France (SNEP)	48
Irish Singles Chart	15
Netherlands (Dutch Top 40)	34
Netherlands (Single Top 100)	26
UK Singles (Official Charts Company)	67

== Certifications ==
Region	Certification	Certified units/sales
Denmark (IFPI Danmark)	Platinum	90,000^{‡}
Germany (BVMI)	Gold	150,000^{‡}
Italy (FIMI)	Gold	25,000^{‡}
New Zealand (RMNZ)	3× Platinum	90,000^{‡}
Spain (Promusicae)	Platinum	60,000^{‡}
United Kingdom (BPI)	Platinum	600,000^{‡}
United States (RIAA)	Gold	500,000^{‡}
^{‡} Sales+streaming figures based on certification alone.

== Cover versions ==
Dutch electronic music duo Dash Berlin released a cover of the song featuring English singer Bo Bruce in November 2022.

Pop Mage · Petricor · Emy Smith released a cover in 2023 on Magic Records.
