= Kodaline =

Irish rock band

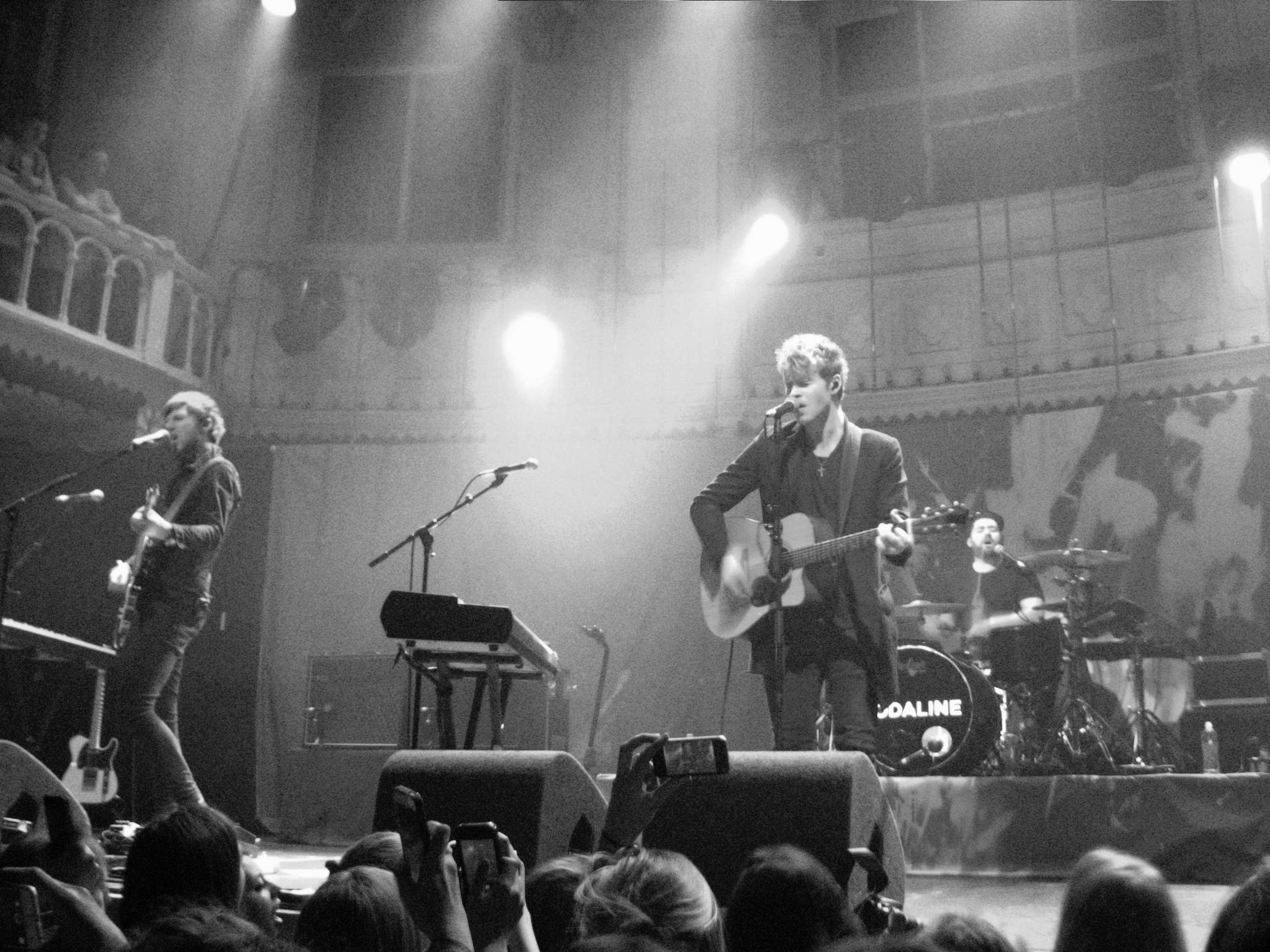
- Kodaline performing in 2015

Background information
- Origin: Swords, County Dublin, Ireland
- Genres: Indie folk, indie rock, indie pop, alternative rock
- Years active: 2005–2026
- Labels: RCA/B-Unique, Fantasy Records
- Members: Steve Garrigan; Vincent May; Mark Prendergast; Jason Boland
- Past members: Conor Linnane
- Website: kodaline.com

Kodaline (/ˈkoʊdəlaɪn/) are an Irish rock band. Originally known as 21 Demands, the band adopted their current name in 2012 to coincide with the changing of their music. The group comprises Steve Garrigan, Vincent May, Mark Prendergast, and Jason Boland.

Garrigan and May grew up in Swords, County Dublin, and have known each other since childhood. May and Garrigan attended Colaiste Choilm CBS, Swords, where they participated in battles of the bands. Boland joined the group in 2012. They have released four albums: In a Perfect World (2013), Coming Up for Air (2015), and Politics of Living (2018). Their fourth album, One Day at a Time, was released on 12 June 2020. In October 2025, the band announced they would be disbanding after the release of a fifth and final album.

== Career ==
=== 2005–2011: 21 Demands ===
As 21 Demands, the band first came to attention in November 2006, when they participated in the fifth series of RTÉ talent show You're a Star; finishing as the series' runners-up. On 3 March 2007, 21 Demands released their own single called "Give Me a Minute" through Pieta House downloads on the RTÉ website. They made history when their single topped the Irish Singles Chart, becoming the first independently released track to achieve this milestone. 21 Demands also wrote the single "One of Those Days" which they played on the Irish SuperValu channel BalconyTV.

=== 2012–2014: In a Perfect World ===
The quartet released their debut extended play—The Kodaline EP—on Friday 7 September 2012, produced by Stephen Harris. "All I Want" was selected as BBC Radio 1 DJ Fearne Cotton's Record of the Week, featured in the season 9 episode of Grey's Anatomy, "Remember the Time", and was used in the background music for Google's 2012: Year in Review video. On 9 December 2012, the BBC announced that Kodaline had been nominated for the Sound of 2013 poll. On 17 June 2013, Kodaline released their first album, In a Perfect World. In a Perfect World includes the singles "High Hopes", "All I Want", "Love Like This", and "Pray", as well as seven new songs. The iTunes deluxe edition of the album contains "The Answer", "Perfect World", "Lose Your Mind", and "Latch", with music videos for "All I Want" and "High Hopes". The CD deluxe edition, instead, contains a CD of live performances of "All I Want", "High Hopes", "Love Like This", "Pray", "All Comes Down", and "The Answer" at The Button Factory in Dublin. Their song "All I Want" was featured on the MTV show Catfish: The TV Show. "All I Want" was also in Season 5, episode 10 of The Vampire Diaries. The songs "Perfect World" and "Brand New Day" from this album, are currently used in the soundtrack for the hit Channel 4 show Gogglebox, the former is the show's main theme tune. In April 2014, Kodaline released a cover version of Paul McCartney's 1980 single "Coming Up" in celebration of Record Store Day. In April 2014, the song "All I Want" was released as part of the soundtrack for The Fault in Our Stars, as well as used in the film. In July 2014, the songs "Pray" and "High Hopes" were featured in trailers for the films Horns and Love, Rosie, respectively. The song "All I Want" was used in TCM Remembers, Turner Classic Movies' annual remembrance of film industry contributors who died in 2014.

=== 2014–2017: Coming Up for Air ===
In December 2014, the band announced their second LP Coming Up for Air, and released a song called "Honest" on YouTube. A few days later they also published the song "Unclear". Following its release on 9 February 2015, the album entered the UK Albums Chart at number 4. "The One" and "Honest" both reached Top 40 in the UK Singles Chart. Lead singer Steve Garrigan appeared on episode 18 of The Midnight Hour.

=== 2017–2019: Politics of Living ===
The lead single "Brother" was released on 23 June 2017. Garrigan once again appeared on The Midnight Hour alongside Eldeniro90 where he premiered new music. The group also released a single, "Follow Your Fire", on 23 March 2018 which was a massive hit in Romania reaching number 7 on the charts. "Shed a Tear" was released as the third single from the album on 15 June 2018. "Worth It" was released as the fourth single from the album on 20 July 2018. "Head Held High" was released as the fifth single from the album on 24 August 2018. The song peaked at number sixty-eight on the Irish Singles Chart. The album titled Politics of Living was released on 28 September 2018.

=== 2020–present: One Day at a Time ===
On 10 January 2020, the band released "Wherever You Are" as the lead single from their fourth album. The song peaked at number sixty-six on the Irish Singles Chart. "Sometimes" was released as the bands second single from their fourth album. The album titled One Day at a Time was released on 12 June 2020. The album peaked at number two on the Irish Albums Chart.

Kodaline released their first live album, Our Roots Run Deep, on 14 October 2022. It was recorded at the Olympia Theatre, Dublin.

On 9 October 2025, Kodaline announced that they would be splitting after over a decade of performing. Following the announcement of their split, farewell shows were announced for Cork and Dublin.

== Musical style and influences ==
Kodaline's music has been described as indie folk, indie rock, indie pop, alternative rock, pop rock with influences of pop, dance-pop and electropop. They are directly influenced by alternative rock and pop acts like Radiohead, Talking Heads, LCD Soundsystem, Sam Cooke, U2, Coldplay, The Smiths, Snow Patrol, Keane and Biffy Clyro.

== Discography ==
Studio albums

- In a Perfect World (2013)
- Coming Up for Air (2015)
- Politics of Living (2018)
- One Day at a Time (2020)
- We Were Only Young (2026)

Live albums

- Our Roots Run Deep (2022)

== Band members ==
=== Current ===
- Steve Garrigan – lead vocals, piano, guitars (2005-present)
- Mark Prendergast – guitars (2005-present)
- Vincent May – drums (2005-present)
- Jason Boland – bass guitar (2012-present)

=== Former ===
- Conor Linnane – bass guitar (2005–2011)

== Awards and nominations ==
Year	Organisation	Award	Result
2012	MTV	Brand New for 2013	Nominated
2012	BBC	Sound of 2013	Nominated
2014	Music Moves Europe Awards	European Border Breakers Awards	Won
2014	Music Moves Europe Awards	Public Choice Award	Won

== Film soundtracks ==
Kodaline have been featured in different movies and shows. Below is a list of some of the films that their music has been played in:

Film or show	Song	Year
All American (CW, Netflix TV Series)	”Shed a Tear”	2019
13 Reasons Why (Netflix TV Series)	"All I Want"	2018
God Friended Me (TV series)	"Shed a Tear"	2018
Grimsby	"All I Want"	2016
The Finest Hours	"Haul Away Joe"	2016
FIFA 17	"Raging"	2016
Boomerang	"All I Want"	2015
T in the Park 2015 (TV series)	"Love Like This"	2015
Britain's Got More Talent (TV series)	"Ready"	2015
French Open Live 2015 (TV mini- series)	"Play the Game"	2015
Aloha	"Love Like This"	2015
The Vampire Diaries (TV series)	"Ready"	2015
The Longest Ride	"Love Like This"	2015
"Crisis"	"Take Control"	2014
Reign	"Love Like This", "Take Control"	2014
Love, Rosie	"High Hopes"	2014
The Fault in our Stars	"All I Want"	2014
Dancing on Ice	"High Hopes"	2014
Sunday Brunch (TV series)	"Honest", "Love Like This"	2013-2014
Gogglebox	"Perfect World", "Brand New Day"	2013
Year in Search 2012: Year In Review by Google	"All I Want"	2012
Grey's Anatomy	”All I Want”	2012

== See also ==
- List of artists who reached number one in Ireland
