= Joe Jonas discography =

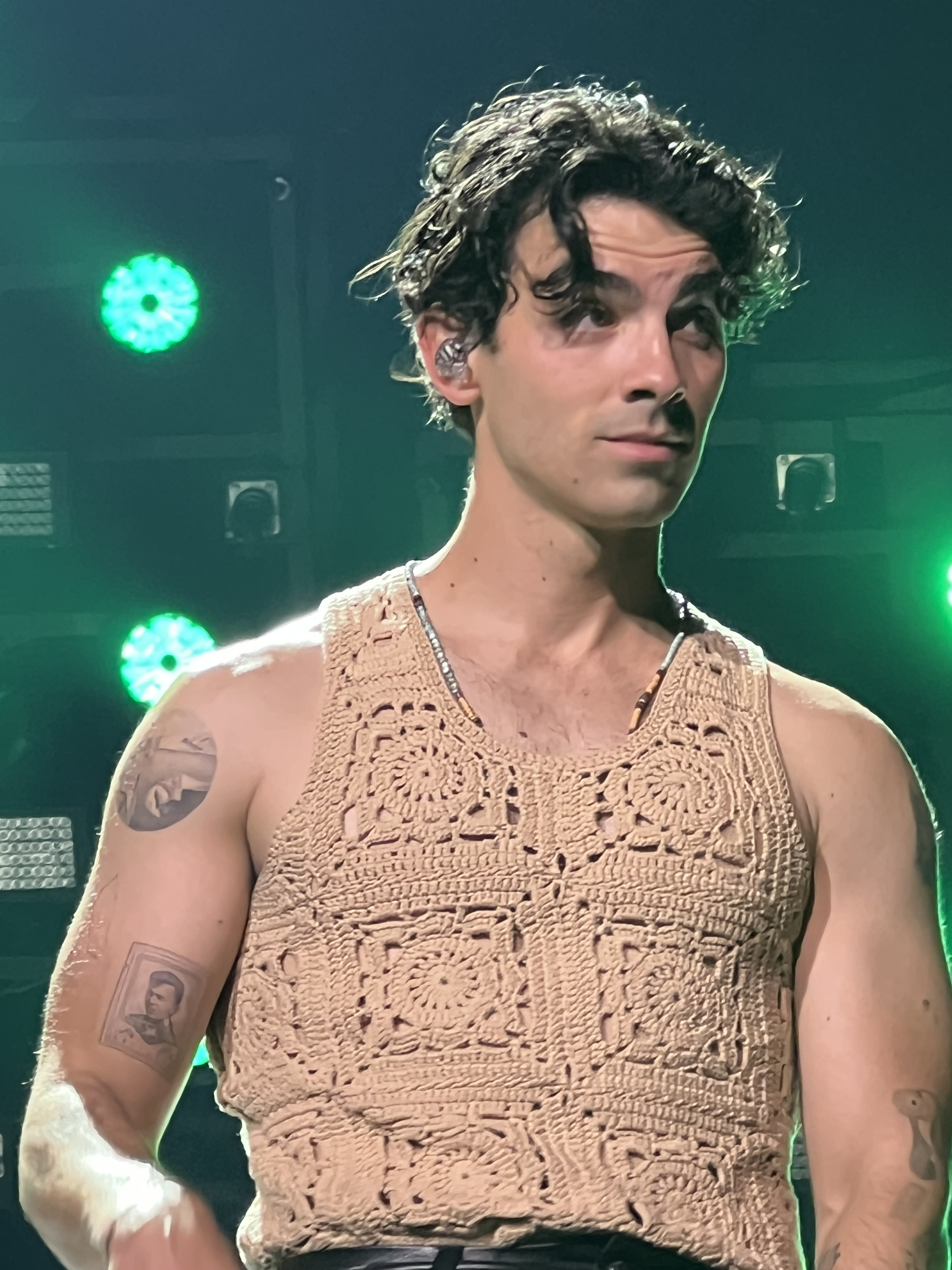
- Jonas in 2023
- Studio albums: 2
- Singles: 19
- Music videos: 14
- Promotional singles: 4

The discography of American singer-songwriter Joe Jonas consists of two studio albums, nineteen singles (including four as a featured artist) and four promotional singles. Jonas released his debut studio album, Fastlife, on October 11, 2011, and followed it up with the release of his second studio album, Music for People Who Believe in Love, on May 23, 2025. He is a member of two bands: the pop rock group Jonas Brothers along with his brothers, Nick and Kevin, and the dance rock group DNCE with drummer Jack Lawless and guitarist JinJoo Lee. Both bands have released successful singles, such as 2019's "Sucker" and 2020's "What a Man Gotta Do" by the Jonas Brothers and 2015's "Cake by the Ocean" and "Toothbrush" by DNCE.

== Albums ==
=== Studio albums ===
List of studio albums, with selected chart positions and certifications
Title	Details	Peak chart positions									Sales
Title	Details	US	AUS	BEL (FL)	BEL (WA)	CAN	FRA	ITA	NL	UK	Sales
Fastlife	Released: October 11, 2011; Label: Hollywood; Formats: CD, vinyl, digital download, streaming	15	—	42	54	23	75	12	85	99	US: 45,000
Music for People Who Believe in Love	Released: May 23, 2025; Label: Republic; Formats: CD, vinyl, digital download, streaming	24	96	55	81	—	—	—	—	—	

== Singles ==
=== As lead artist ===
List of singles as lead artist, showing year released, with selected chart positions, certifications and album name
Title	Year	Peak chart positions										Certifications	Album
Title	Year	US	US Pop	AUS	AUT	BEL	CAN	NOR	SCO	SWI	UK	Certifications	Album
"This Is Me" (with Demi Lovato)	2008	9	—	46	18	—	16	12	68	39	33	RIAA: Platinum; ARIA: Platinum; BPI: Silver	Camp Rock
"Gotta Find You"	2008	30	41	82	31	—	26	—	—	58	87	RIAA: Gold	Camp Rock
"Wouldn't Change a Thing" (with Demi Lovato)	2010	—^{[C]}	—	—	—	—	90	—	57	—	71	RIAA: Gold	Camp Rock 2: The Final Jam
"See No More"	2011	92	37	—	—	64	—	—	46	—	53		Fastlife
"Just in Love" (solo or featuring Lil Wayne)	2011	—^{[A]}	—	—	—	56	—	—	91	—	85		Fastlife
"It's Party Time"	2018	—	—	—	—	—	—	—	—	—	—		Hotel Transylvania 3: Summer Vacation (Original Motion Picture Soundtrack)
"Go It Alone"	2021	—	—	—	—	—	—	—	—	—	—		Rumble (Original Song from Film)
"Not Alone" (with Khalid)	2022	—	—	—	—	—	—	—	—	—	—		Devotion (Original Song from Film)
"Work It Out"	2024	—	—	—	—	—	—	—	—	—	—		Music for People Who Believe in Love
"Thick of It All" (with Alan Walker and Julia Michaels)	2024	—	—	—	—	—	—	—	—	—	—		Walkerworld 2.0
"What This Could Be"	2024	—	—	—	—	—	—	—	—	—	—		Music for People Who Believe in Love
"¿Cómo Pasó?" (with Ela Taubert)	2024	—	—	—	—	—	—	—	—	—	—		Preguntas a Las 11:11
"Burning Down" (with Alex Warren)	2024	—	—	—	—	—	—	—	—	—	—		Non-album singles
"All I Forgot" (with Ashley Cooke)	2025	—	—	—	—	—	—	—	—	—	—		Non-album singles
"Heart by Heart"	2025	—	—	—	—	—	—	—	—	—	—		Music for People Who Believe in Love
"—" denotes releases that did not chart or were not released in that territory.

=== As featured artist ===
List of singles as featured artist, showing year released, with selected chart positions and album name
Title	Year	Peak chart positions									Album
Title	Year	US	AUS	BEL (FL)	BEL (WA)	CAN	ITA	NZ	NOR	UK	Album
"We Are the World 25 for Haiti" (among Artists for Haiti)	2010	2	18	1	1	7	10	8	1	50	Non-album singles
"One Chance to Dance" (Naughty Boy featuring Joe Jonas)	2017	—	—	—	—	—	—	—	—	—	Non-album singles
"Longer Than I Thought" (Loote featuring Joe Jonas)	2018	—	—	—	—	—	—	—	—	—	Single.
"I See Love" (Jonas Blue featuring Joe Jonas)	2018	—	—	—	—	—	—	—	—	—	Blue
"—" denotes releases that did not chart or were not released in that territory.

=== Promotional singles ===
List of singles, with selected chart positions
Title	Year	Peak chart positions		Album
Title	Year	US	US Dance	Album
"Make a Wave" (with Demi Lovato)	2010	84	—	Non-album promotional single
"Eu Não Mudaria Nada Em Você" (with Jullie)	2010	—	—	Camp Rock 2: The Final Jam
"Nada Vou Mudar" (with Mia Rose)	2010	—	—	Camp Rock 2: The Final Jam
"Love Slayer"	2011	—	8	Fastlife
"—" denotes releases that did not chart or were not released in that territory.

== Guest appearances ==
Title	Year	Other artist(s)	Album
"You're My Favorite Song"	2010	Demi Lovato	Camp Rock 2: The Final Jam
"What We Came Here For"	2010	Demi Lovato, Nick Jonas, Alyson Stoner and Anna Maria Perez de Taglé	Camp Rock 2: The Final Jam
"This Is Our Song"	2010	Demi Lovato, Nick Jonas and Alyson Stoner	Camp Rock 2: The Final Jam
"Finish What We Started" (Andrew Maury Remix)	2013	Miles Fisher	Video Music
"I Bet" (Remix)	2015	Ciara	Jackie
"Clouds of Guilt"	2021	William Shatner	Bill
"God Blessed Texas"	2022	—N/a	The Righteous Gemstones: Season 2

== Songwriting discography ==
Discography
Year	Artist	Album	Song	Co-written with
2006	Jonas Brothers	It's About Time	"Time for Me to Fly"	Nicholas Jonas, Kevin Jonas II, PJ Bianco
2006	Jonas Brothers	It's About Time	"One Day at a Time"	Nicholas Jonas, Kevin Jonas II, Michael Mangini, Steve Greenberg
2006	Jonas Brothers	It's About Time	"Mandy"	Nicholas Jonas, Kevin Jonas II
2006	Jonas Brothers	It's About Time	"You Just Don't Know It"	Nicholas Jonas, Kevin Jonas II, Desmond Child
2006	Jonas Brothers	It's About Time	"Underdog"	Nicholas Jonas, Kevin Jonas II, Tor E. Hermansen, Mikkel S. Eriksen, Jess Cates
2006	Jonas Brothers	It's About Time	"7:05"	Nicholas Jonas, Kevin Jonas II, Michael Mangini
2006	Jonas Brothers	It's About Time	"Please Be Mine"	Nicholas Jonas, Kevin Jonas II
2007	Jonas Brothers	Jonas Brothers	"Hold On"	Nicholas Jonas
2007	Jonas Brothers	Jonas Brothers	"Goodnight and Goodbye"	Nicholas Jonas
2007	Jonas Brothers	Jonas Brothers	"That's Just the Way We Roll"	Nicholas Jonas, Kevin Jonas II, William McAuley III
2007	Jonas Brothers	Jonas Brothers	"Hello Beautiful"	Nicholas Jonas, Kevin Jonas II
2007	Jonas Brothers	Jonas Brothers	"Still in Love with You"	Nicholas Jonas,
2007	Jonas Brothers	Jonas Brothers	"Australia"	Nicholas Jonas
2007	Jonas Brothers	Jonas Brothers	"Games"	Nicholas Jonas, Kevin Jonas II
2007	Jonas Brothers	Jonas Brothers	"When You Look Me in the Eyes"	Nicholas Jonas, PJ Bianco, Raymond Boyd
2007	Jonas Brothers	Jonas Brothers	"Inseparable"	Nicholas Jonas
2007	Jonas Brothers	Jonas Brothers	"Just Friends"	Nicholas Jonas
2007	Jonas Brothers	Jonas Brothers	"Hollywood"	Nicholas Jonas, John Fields
2007	Jonas Brothers	Jonas Brothers	"Take a Breath"	Nicholas Jonas, Kevin Jonas II
2008	Jonas Brothers	A Little Bit Longer	"BB Good"	Nicholas Jonas, Kevin Jonas II
2008	Jonas Brothers	A Little Bit Longer	"Burnin' Up"	Nicholas Jonas, Kevin Jonas II
2008	Jonas Brothers	A Little Bit Longer	"Shelf"	Nicholas Jonas, Kevin Jonas II
2008	Jonas Brothers	A Little Bit Longer	"One Man Show"	Nicholas Jonas, Kevin Jonas II
2008	Jonas Brothers	A Little Bit Longer	"Lovebug"	Nicholas Jonas, Kevin Jonas II
2008	Jonas Brothers	A Little Bit Longer	"Tonight"	Nicholas Jonas, Kevin Jonas II, Greg Garbowsky
2008	Jonas Brothers	A Little Bit Longer	"Video Girl"	Nicholas Jonas, Kevin Jonas II
2008	Jonas Brothers	A Little Bit Longer	"Pushin' Me Away"	Nicholas Jonas, Kevin Jonas II
2008	Jonas Brothers	A Little Bit Longer	"Sorry"	Nicholas Jonas, Kevin Jonas II, John Fields
2008	Demi Lovato	Don't Forget	"La La Land"	Nicholas Jonas, Kevin Jonas II, Demi Lovato
2008	Demi Lovato	Don't Forget	"Get Back"	Nicholas Jonas, Kevin Jonas II, Demi Lovato
2008	Demi Lovato	Don't Forget	"On the Line" (with Jonas Brothers)	Nicholas Jonas, Kevin Jonas II, Demi Lovato
2008	Demi Lovato	Don't Forget	"Don't Forget"	Nicholas Jonas, Kevin Jonas II, Demi Lovato
2008	Demi Lovato	Don't Forget	"Gonna Get Caught"	Nicholas Jonas, Kevin Jonas II, Demi Lovato
2008	Demi Lovato	Don't Forget	"Two Worlds Collide"	Nicholas Jonas, Kevin Jonas II, Demi Lovato
2011	Joe Jonas	Fastlife	"All This Time"	Nathaniel Hills, Kevin Cossom, Marcella Araica
2011	Joe Jonas	Fastlife	"Just in Love"	Robin Tadross, LaShawn Daniels, James Fauntleroy II
2011	Joe Jonas	Fastlife	"See No More"	Brian Kennedy, Christopher Brown
2011	Joe Jonas	Fastlife	"Love Slayer"	Nathaniel Hills, Kevin Cossom, Marcella Araica
2011	Joe Jonas	Fastlife	"Fastlife"	Robin Tadross, LaShawn Daniels, James Fauntleroy II
2011	Joe Jonas	Fastlife	"Make You Mine"	Nathaniel Hills, Marcella Araica, Claude Kelly
2011	Joe Jonas	Fastlife	"Sorry"	Robin Tadross, Kevin Cossom, Marcella Araica
2011	Joe Jonas	Fastlife	"Not Right Now"	Nathaniel Hills, James Washington, Kevin Cossom, Marcella Araica
2013	John Legend	Love in the Future	"Dreams"	John Stephens, Kanye West, Darhyl Camper, Jessyca Wilson
2015	Ciara	Jackie (Deluxe)	"I Bet" (Remix) (featuring Joe Jonas)	Ciara Harris, Theron Thomas, Timothy Thomas, Harmony Samuels
2015	DNCE	Swaay	"Cake by the Ocean"	Mattias Larsson, Robin Fredriksson, Justin Tranter
2015	DNCE	Swaay	"Pay My Rent"	Ilya Salmanzadeh, James Ghaleb, Rickard Goransson
2015	DNCE	Swaay	"Toothbrush"	Ilya Salmanzadeh, James Ghaleb, Rickard Goransson
2016	DNCE	DNCE	"DNCE"	Ilya Salmanzadeh, Justin Tranter, James Ghaleb, Rickard Goransson
2016	DNCE	DNCE	"Body Moves"	Justin Tranter, Rami Yacoub, Albin Nedler, Kristoffer Fogelmark
2016	DNCE	DNCE	"Doctor You"	Oscar Görres, Oscar Holter, James Ghaleb
2016	DNCE	DNCE	"Blown" (featuring Kent Jones)	Daryl Jones, Oscar Görres, Oscar Holter, Justin Tranter, Paul Shelton II
2016	DNCE	DNCE	"Good Day"	Mattias Larsson, Robin Fredriksson, Justin Tranter
2016	DNCE	DNCE	"Almost"	Nolan Lambroza, Simon Wilcox, Dewain Whitmore Jr., Neal Persiani
2016	DNCE	DNCE	"Naked"	Mattias Larsson, Robin Fredriksson, Oscar Görres
2016	DNCE	DNCE	"Truthfully"	Justin Tranter, Rami Yacoub, Albin Nedler, Kristoffer Fogelmark
2016	DNCE	DNCE	"Be Mean"	Oscar Görres, Oscar Holter, James Ghaleb
2016	DNCE	DNCE	"Zoom"	Ilya Salmanzadeh, Justin Tranter, Rickard Goransson
2016	DNCE	DNCE	"Unsweet"	Nolan Lambroza, Aaron Zuckerman, Simon Wilcox, Dewain Whitmore Jr., Neal Persiani
2017	DNCE	My Little Pony: The Movie	"Can U Feel It"	Cole Whittle, Paul Blair, Mark Nilan, Sam Hollander, Nate Cyphert
2017	End of the World	Chameleon	"Hollow" (featuring DNCE)	Fukase Satoshi, Nakashima Shinichi, Cole Whittle, Christopher J. Baran
2018	DNCE	Non-album singles	"Dance"	Eric Frederic, John Ryan, Teddy Geiger, Ammar Malik, Neal Persiani
2018	Merk & Kremont	Non-album singles	"Hands Up" (featuring DNCE)	Federico Mercuri, Giordano Cremona, Joshua Record, Anthony Whiting, Andrew Bullimore, Emily Phillips, Eugenio Maimone, Simone Privitera
2018	DNCE	People to People	"Man on Fire"	Ido Zmishlany, Matthew Koma
2019	Jonas Brothers	Music from Chasing Happiness	"Jersey"	Nicholas Jonas, Kevin Jonas II, Jason Evigan, James Ghaleb
2019	Jonas Brothers	Happiness Begins	"Sucker"	Nicholas Jonas, Kevin Jonas II, Ryan Tedder, Adam Feeney, Louis Bell
2019	Jonas Brothers	Happiness Begins	"Cool"	Nicholas Jonas, Kevin Jonas II, Ryan Tedder, Zach Skelton, Casey Smith
2019	Jonas Brothers	Happiness Begins	"Only Human"	Nicholas Jonas, Kevin Jonas II, Karl Schuster
2019	Jonas Brothers	Happiness Begins	"Every Single Time"	Nicholas Jonas, Greg Kurstin, Maureen McDonald
2019	Jonas Brothers	Happiness Begins	"Don't Throw It Away"	Nicholas Jonas, Greg Kurstin, Maureen McDonald
2019	Jonas Brothers	Happiness Begins	"Love Her"	Nicholas Jonas, Kevin Jonas II, Mike Elizondo
2019	Jonas Brothers	Happiness Begins	"Trust"	Nicholas Jonas, Ryan Tedder, Jason Evigan, Ammar Malik
2019	Jonas Brothers	Happiness Begins	"Strangers"	Nicholas Jonas, Greg Kurstin, Maureen McDonald
2019	Jonas Brothers	Happiness Begins	"Hesitate"	Mike Sabath, Justin Tranter, Kennedi Lykken
2019	Jonas Brothers	Happiness Begins	"Comeback"	Nicholas Jonas, Kevin Jonas II, Sylvester Sivertsen, James Ghaleb
2019	Jonas Brothers	Non-album single	"Greenlight" (from Songland)	Nicholas Jonas, Kevin Jonas II, Ester Dean, Shane McAnally, Ryan Tedder, Zach Skelton, John Paciolla
2019	Diplo and Jonas Brothers	Diplo Presents Thomas Wesley, Chapter 1: Snake Oil	"Lonely"	Thomas Pentz, Nicholas Jonas, Kevin Jonas II, Ryan Tedder, Henry Allen, Philip Meckseper
2019	Jonas Brothers	Non-album singles	"Like It's Christmas"	Nicholas Jonas, Kevin Jonas II, Jason Evigan, Freddy Wexler, Gian Stone, Annika Wells
2020	Jonas Brothers	Non-album singles	"What a Man Gotta Do"	Nicholas Jonas, Kevin Jonas II, Ryan Tedder, David Stewart, Jessica Agombar
2020	Jonas Brothers	Non-album singles	"Five More Minutes"	Nicholas Jonas, Kevin Jonas II, Brittany Amaradio, Casey Smith, James Ghaleb, Zach Skelton
2021	Jordan McGraw	Non-album singles	"Her"	Marc Sibley, Nathan Cunningham, Nicholas Jonas, Ross Golan
2021	Jonas Brothers	Non-album singles	"Who's in Your Head"	Nicholas Jonas, Kevin Jonas II, Max Martin, Ilya Salmanzadeh, Rami Yacoub, David Stewart
2021	Joe Jonas	Non-album singles	"Go It Alone"	Marc Sibley, Nathan Cunningham, James Ghaleb
2022	DNCE	Non-album singles	"Move"	Ryan Tedder, Andrew DeRoberts
2022	DNCE	Anything's Possible (Motion Picture Soundtrack)	"Flamingo"	Ryan Tedder, Sean Douglas, Casey Smith, Zach Skelton, Jacob Greenspan
2022	Joe Jonas and Khalid	Non-album single	"Not Alone"	Khalid Robinson, Ryan Tedder, Bernard Harvey
2023	Jonas Brothers	The Album	"Miracle"	Nicholas Jonas, Kevin Jonas II, Jonathan Bellion, Jordan K. Johnson, Stefan Johnson, Alexander Izquierdo, Peter Nappi, Jason Cornet
2023	Jonas Brothers	The Album	"Montana Sky"	Nicholas Jonas, Kevin Jonas II, Jonathan Bellion, Jordan K. Johnson, Stefan Johnson, Peter Nappi, Jason Cornet, Gregory Hein, James Gutch
2023	Jonas Brothers	The Album	"Wings"	Nicholas Jonas, Kevin Jonas II, Jonathan Bellion, Jordan K. Johnson, Stefan Johnson, Peter Nappi, Jason Cornet, Clyde Lawrence, Jordan Cohen
2023	Jonas Brothers	The Album	"Sail Away"	Nicholas Jonas, Kevin Jonas II, Jonathan Bellion, Jordan K. Johnson, Stefan Johnson, Peter Nappi, Jason Cornet, Michael Pollack, Calle Lehmann
2023	Jonas Brothers	The Album	"Americana"	Nicholas Jonas, Kevin Jonas II, Jonathan Bellion, Jordan K. Johnson, Stefan Johnson, Alexander Izquierdo, Peter Nappi, Jason Cornet
2023	Jonas Brothers	The Album	"Celebrate!"	Nicholas Jonas, Kevin Jonas II, Jonathan Bellion, Jordan K. Johnson, Stefan Johnson, Alexander Izquierdo, Peter Nappi, Jason Cornet, Michael Pollack
2023	Jonas Brothers	The Album	"Waffle House"	Nicholas Jonas, Kevin Jonas II, Jonathan Bellion, Peter Nappi, Jason Cornet, Daniel Tashian, Ido Zmishlany, Johnny Simpson, Gregory Hein
2023	Jonas Brothers	The Album	"Vacation Eyes"	Nicholas Jonas, Kevin Jonas II, Jonathan Bellion, Peter Nappi, Jason Cornet
2023	Jonas Brothers	The Album	"Summer in the Hamptons"	Nicholas Jonas, Kevin Jonas II, Jonathan Bellion, Peter Nappi, Jason Cornet, Gregory Hein, Felicia Ferraro, Elisha Noll
2023	Jonas Brothers	The Album	"Summer Baby"	Nicholas Jonas, Kevin Jonas II, Jonathan Bellion, Jordan K. Johnson, Stefan Johnson, Peter Nappi, Jason Cornet, Michael Pollack, Gregory Hein
2023	Jonas Brothers	The Album	"Little Bird"	Nicholas Jonas, Kevin Jonas II, Jonathan Bellion, Jordan K. Johnson, Stefan Johnson, Peter Nappi, Jason Cornet, Michael Pollack, Gregory Hein
2023	Jonas Brothers	The Album	"Walls" (featuring Jon Bellion)	Nicholas Jonas, Kevin Jonas II, Jonathan Bellion, Peter Nappi, Jason Cornet, Johnny Simpson, Clyde Lawrence, Jordan Cohen, Felicia Ferraro, Andrea Rosario, Douglas Davis

== Music videos ==
List of music videos, showing year released and director
Title	Year	Director	Notes
As lead artist
"We Rock" (Cast Video)	2008	—N/a	With of Camp Rock
"Send It On"	2009	F. Michael Blum	Among Disney's Friends for Change
"We Are the World 25 for Haiti"	2010	Paul Haggis	Among Artists for Haiti
"Make a Wave"	2010	F. Michael Blum; Tracy Pion	With Demi Lovato
"It's On"	2010	Brandon Dickerson	With Camp Rock 2: The Final Jam
"Eu Não Mudaria Nada Em Você"	2010	—N/a	With Jullie
"Nada Vou Mudar"	2010	—N/a	With Mia Rose
"See No More"	2011	Paul Minor	
"Just in Love"	2011	Jaci Judelson	
"All This Time"	2012	Michel Sandy	
As featured artist
"One Chance to Dance" (Naughty Boy)	2017	—N/a	
Guest appearances
"Giving Up the Gun" (Vampire Weekend)	2010	The Malloys	
"Boys" (Charli XCX)	2017	Charli XCX	

== Notes ==
Notes

- A: "Just in Love" didn't enter the Billboard Hot 100, but peaked at number 3 on the Bubbling Under Hot 100 Singles.
- B: "Wouldn't Change a Thing" was released as a single under three different versions. The original version from Demi Lovato and Jonas, was released in the United States and Canada on July 25, 2010. In Brazil, a Brazilian-Portuguese version titled "Eu Não Mudaria Nada Em Você", with Jullie was released on August 4. In Portugal, a Portuguese version titled "Nada Vou Mudar", was released on August 9 featuring Mia Rose.
- C: "Wouldn't Change a Thing" didn't enter the Billboard Hot 100, but peaked at number 10 on the Bubbling Under Hot 100 Singles.
