= DNCE discography =

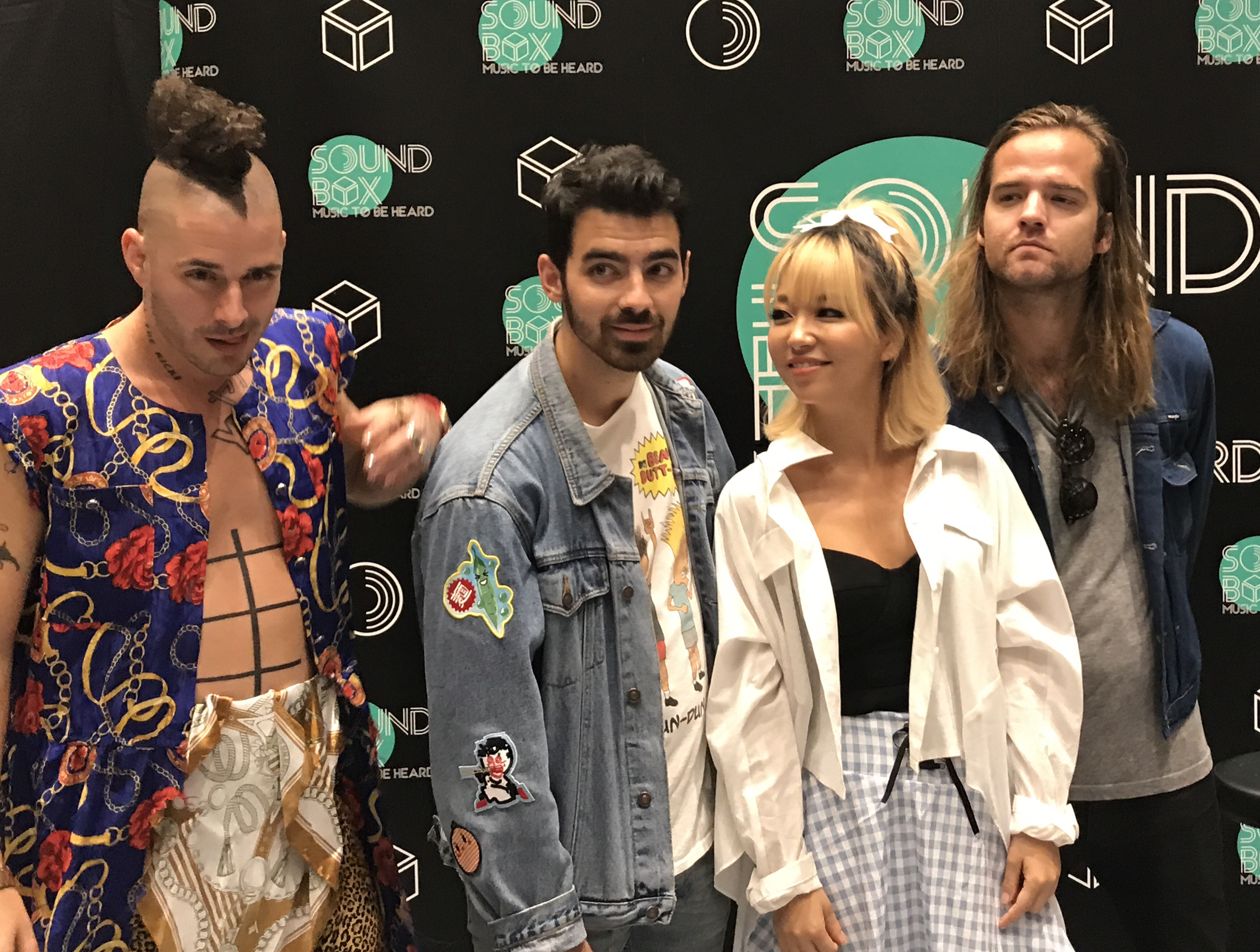
- Cole Whittle, Joe Jonas, JinJoo Lee and Jack Lawless in 2017
- Studio albums: 1
- EPs: 3
- Singles: 12
- Promotional singles: 4
- Music videos: 10

The discography of American band DNCE consists of one studio album, two extended plays, seven singles, four featured singles, four promotional singles, and 11 other guest appearances on other albums. The band has sold 5 million copies worldwide and have collaborated with acts such as Nicki Minaj, Charlie Puth, Rita Ora, Sabrina Carpenter, Fifth Harmony, Tinashe, Hailee Steinfeld, Rod Stewart, and Kygo.

The group released their debut single, "Cake by the Ocean", on September 18, 2015. Though starting out slow, the song went on to become a success in numerous territories, peaking at number 9 on the Billboard Hot 100, and at number 7 on the Canadian Hot 100. They then released their second single, "Toothbrush", which also received decent success, although less of a success than "Cake by the Ocean", peakng at number 44 on the Billboard Hot 100.

After releasing their first two singles (alongside their feature on Hailee Steinfeld's "Rock Bottom"), the group released their debut extended play, Swaay, on the 23rd of October, 2015. The four-track album received a generally positive critical reception upon its release, with Entertainment Weekly writing that it "splits the difference between [Joe's] former band’s slick power pop and the electro-kissed pop stylings of his solo album." The EP would later reach number 39 on the Billboard 200, and would reach as high as number 18 on the Billboard Canadian Albums chart.

That same year, the band would release their third single, "Body Moves", which (alongside three promotional singles) would lead to their debut self-titled studio album, released on the 18th of November, 2016. The album would reach number 17 on the Billboard 200 and would be certified gold. The album would later be re-released on the 8th of November, 2017 in Japan, with six bonus tracks, including the sole single for the reissue, "Kissing Strangers", featuring rapper Nicki Minaj. The band's remix of Rod Stewart's "Da Ya Think I'm Sexy?" would also release that year.

In 2018, the band released their second EP, People to People, on the 15th of June, 2018. This EP did not chart, and was released in Japan with the bonus track "Dance", which also did not chart. After 2018 ended, DNCE went on hiatus as lead singer Joe Jonas and drummer Jack Lawless resumed work with the Jonas Brothers after their reunion in 2019. DNCE returned in February 2022, featuring on Kygo's "Dancing Feet" and releasing two more singles, "Move" and "Got Me Good", alongside contributing the song "Flamingo" to the movie Anything's Possible. After two years, the band would go on hiatus once again in 2024. The band briefly returned in 2024 to release a remix of Joe Jonas' song "Work It Out" alongside a compilation EP including a number of their previous singles.

== Studio albums ==
List of studio albums, with selected chart positions and certifications
Title	Details	Peak chart positions										Certifications
Title	Details	US	AUS	BEL	CAN	FRA	IRL	JPN	SPA	SWI	UK	Certifications
DNCE	Released: November 18, 2016; Label: Republic; Formats: CD, LP, digital download	17	32	73	43	166	76	43	86	89	48	RIAA: Gold

=== Re-issued albums ===
List of compilation albums
Title	Album details
DNCE (Jumbo Edition)	Released: November 8, 2017 (Japan); Label: Republic; Format: CD, digital download

== Extended plays ==
List of extended plays, with selected chart positions and certifications
Title	Details	Peak chart positions			Certifications
Title	Details	US	CAN	DEN	Certifications
Swaay	Released: October 23, 2015; Label: Republic; Formats: CD, digital download	39	18	19	ARIA: Platinum
People to People	Released: June 15, 2018; Label: Republic; Format: CD, digital download	—	—	—	
"—" denotes releases that did not chart or were not released in that territory.

== Miscellaneous ==
=== Streaming-exclusive compilations ===
List of compilations with notes
Title	Details	Notes
Music For People Who Believe In DNCE	Released: September 20, 2024; Format: Streaming, digital download; Label: Republic	Playlist consisting of select songs from the Joe Jonas and DNCE

== Singles ==
=== As lead artist ===
List of singles, with selected chart positions and certifications
Title	Year	Peak chart positions									Certifications	Album
Title	Year	US	AUS	CAN	IRL	ITA	JPN Over.	NZ	SWE	UK	Certifications	Album
"Cake by the Ocean"	2015	9	6	7	6	11	1	10	24	4	RIAA: 5× Platinum; ARIA: 7× Platinum; BPI: 3× Platinum; FIMI: 4× Platinum; IFPI DEN: Gold; IFPI SWE: Platinum; MC: 2× Platinum; RMNZ: 6× Platinum	Swaay
"Toothbrush"	2016	44	33	36	65	—	—	—	—	49	RIAA: Platinum; ARIA: Gold; BPI: Silver; RMNZ: Gold	Swaay
"Body Moves"	2016	—	62	—	—	—	2	— (Note: "Body Moves" did not enter the NZ Top 40 Singles Chart, but peaked at number two on the NZ Heatseekers Singles Chart.)	96	99		DNCE
"Kissing Strangers" (featuring Nicki Minaj)	2017	— (Note: "Kissing Strangers" did not enter the Billboard Hot 100, but peaked at number 3 on the Bubbling Under Hot 100 Singles chart.)	96	73	—	41	—	— (Note: "Kissing Strangers" did not enter the NZ Top 40 Singles Chart, but peaked at number four on the NZ Heatseekers Singles Chart.)	—	—	FIMI: Platinum	Non-album singles
"Dance"	2018	—	—	—	—	—	—	—	—	—		Non-album singles
"Move"	2022	—	—	—	—	—	8	—	—	—		Non-album singles
"Got Me Good"	2022	—	—	—	—	—	—	—	—	—		Non-album singles
"Work It Out" (DNCE Remix)	2024	—	—	—	—	—	—	—	—	—		Music for People Who Believe in DNCE
"—" denotes releases that did not chart or were not released in that territory.

=== As featured artist ===
List of singles, with selected chart positions and certifications
Title	Year	Peak chart positions					Certifications	Album
Title	Year	US Bub.	CAN	ITA	NZ Hot	WW	Certifications	Album
"Rock Bottom" (Hailee Steinfeld featuring DNCE)	2016	3	61	—	—	—	RIAA: Platinum; MC: Gold; RMNZ: Platinum	Haiz
"Da Ya Think I'm Sexy?" (Rod Stewart featuring DNCE)	2017	—	—	—	—	—		Non-album singles
"Hands Up" (Merk & Kremont featuring DNCE)	2018	—	—	42	—	—	FIMI: Platinum	Non-album singles
"Dancing Feet" (Kygo featuring DNCE)	2022	16	68	—	3	165		Thrill of the Chase
"—" denotes releases that did not chart or were not released in that territory.

=== Promotional singles ===
Title	Year	Album
"Blown" (featuring Kent Jones)	2016	DNCE
"Good Day"	2016	DNCE
"Be Mean"	2016	DNCE
"Santa Claus Is Coming to Town" (featuring Charlie Puth, Hailee Steinfeld, Daya, Fifth Harmony, Rita Ora, Tinashe, Sabrina Carpenter and Jake Miller)	2016	Non-album promotional single

=== Other certified songs ===
Title	Year	Certification	Album
"Truthfully"	2016	RMNZ: Gold	DNCE

== Guest appearances ==
Title	Year	Album
"Maybe (Baby)"	2016	Grease: Live
"Born to Hand Jive"	2016	Grease: Live
"Rock n' Roll Party Queen"	2016	Grease: Live
"Rock n' Roll Is Here to Stay"	2016	Grease: Live
"What's Love Got to Do With It"	2016	The Time Is Now
"Hands to Myself"	2016	BBC Radio 1's Live Lounge 2016
"Forever"	2017	The Lego Batman Movie
"Can You Feel It"	2017	My Little Pony: The Movie
"Hollow" (End of the World featuring DNCE)	2017	Chameleon
"Christmas Without You"	2017	A Very ROC Christmas
"Flamingo"	2022	Anything's Possible (Motion Picture Soundtrack)

== Music videos ==
=== As lead artist ===
Title	Year	Director
"Cake by the Ocean"	2015	Black Coffee, Gigi Hadid
"Toothbrush"	2016	Luke Monaghan
"Body Moves" (Victoria's Secret version)	2016	Unknown
"Body Moves"	2016	Hannah Lux Davis
"Kissing Strangers"	2017	Marc Klasfeld
"Good Day"	2017	SONIC

=== As featured artist ===
Title	Year	Director	Notes
"Rock Bottom"	2016	Malia James	Hailee Steinfeld's music video
"Hands Up"	2018	Andrea Gallo	Merk & Kremont's music video
"Dancing Feet"	2022	Johannes Lovund	Kygo's music video

=== As actor ===
Title	Year	Director	Notes
"One More Night"	2017	Zac Ella	End of the World's music video
