= Kissing Strangers =

2017 single by DNCE featuring Nicki Minaj

Single by DNCE featuring Nicki Minaj
- Released: April 14, 2017
- Genre: Pop
- Length: 3:22
- Label: Republic
- Songwriters: Onika Maraj; Justin Tranter; Mattias Larsson; Robin Fredriksson
- Producer: Mattman & Robin

DNCE singles chronology
"Body Moves" (2016)	"Kissing Strangers" (2017)	"Da Ya Think I'm Sexy?" (2017)

Nicki Minaj singles chronology
"Light My Body Up" (2017)	"Kissing Strangers" (2017)	"Swish Swish" (2017)

Music video
- "Kissing Strangers" on YouTube

"Kissing Strangers" is a song by the American band DNCE, featuring vocals from pop-rap rapper Nicki Minaj. It was released as a single through Republic Records on April 14, 2017. It was later included on the bonus edition of the band's debut album DNCE, which was released in 2016 and only available on the 2017 Japan version. The remix was a collaboration with the Puerto Rican singer Luis Fonsi, who was added to the song, was released on July 28, 2017. "Kissing Strangers" is a pop song.

== Background ==
On April 6, 2017, the band posted a picture of Doug the Pug including a phone number listed on his dog tag, if dialed, an instrumental chorus of "Kissing Strangers" will be offered. DNCE and Nicki Minaj teased the collaboration via social media on April 10, 2017. Nicki Minaj revealed photos from the music video, while DNCE released a preview of the song, with an early snippet offered by dialing a phone number.

In an interview by CBS Radio, Joe Jonas of DNCE said: "'Kissing Strangers' is a song about having fun with a stranger, getting to know them a little better, [and then] they're no longer a stranger. Just finding yourself; finding who you want to be with."

"We have the amazing, beautiful, talented Nicki Minaj on the track as well. We shot the music video in L.A. a week ago, and we can't wait to share that." Jonas continued. "We're huge fans of her work, and it was an immediate thought to have her be a part of the song, so we sent her the track, she wrote her verse in like, five minutes, and came out exactly how we'd hopes and she kills it... in the best way."

"I'm really proud of 'Kissing Strangers,'" Justin Tranter, co-writer of the song, told Billboard magazine. "The chorus is about being open-minded to the love that might be in front of you." Cole Whittle said: "I've been working with Justin since we were kids, he's like family to us. He introduced Joe and I, so he's a big part of why DNCE exists."

== Music video ==
Shortly after the song was released, the band posted a teaser of the music video on social media. The teaser is a behind-the-scenes exclusive look at the video production.

The music video was released on May 12, 2017, via Vevo on DNCE's YouTube channel. It was directed by American music video director Marc Klasfeld, and included all DNCE members and Nicki Minaj. In the video, DNCE holds a house party. It starts with an innocent game of spin the bottle, then Nicki Minaj walks through the door, and is invited by Jonas to get up to the stage with him. She drops the microphone and grabs Jonas by his collar, then puts her lips close to his lips.

== Live performances ==
On May 8, 2017, DNCE made their major performance debut of "Kissing Strangers" at the 28th GLAAD Media Awards in New York City, alongside their 2016 song "Cake by the Ocean". "The GLAAD Media Awards is an incredible ceremony," Joe Jonas told Billboard magazine at the event. "To be part of something like this, and to play this song — to have fun and celebrate, that's what it's about." On May 16, 2017, the band performed the track in the elimination episode of The Voice, it ended with dozens of lip-shaped balloons falling down on the band. On July 6, 2017, DNCE performed the song at Univision's Premios Juventud 2017, the annual youth awards. It marks their first-ever performance on Spanish-language television.

== Track listing ==
Digital download
No.	Title	Length
1.	"Kissing Strangers" (featuring Nicki Minaj)	3:22

Digital download – Remix
No.	Title	Length
1.	"Kissing Strangers" (Remix) (with Luis Fonsi featuring Nicki Minaj)	3:22

== Credits and personnel ==
Credits adapted from Tidal.

- Justin Drew Tranter – composer, lyricist, background vocalist
- Mattman & Robin – composer, lyricist, producer, background vocalist, bassist, clapper, drummer, guitarist, maracas player, percussion player, programmer, tambourine player
- Nicki Minaj – composer, lyricist
- Joe Jonas – composer, principal vocalist
- Jack Lawless – background vocalist, drummer
- JinJoo Lee – background vocalist, guitarist
- Cole Whittle – background vocalist, bassist
- Serban Ghenea – mixer

== Charts ==
=== Weekly charts ===
Weekly chart performance for "Kissing Strangers"
Chart (2017)	Peak position
Argentina Anglo (Monitor Latino)	7
Australia (ARIA)	96
Belarus Airplay (Eurofest)	6
Belgium (Ultratip Bubbling Under Flanders)	–
Belgium (Ultratip Bubbling Under Wallonia)	15
Canada Hot 100 (Billboard)	73
Canada CHR/Top 40 (Billboard)	41
Canada Hot AC (Billboard)	41
CIS Airplay (TopHit)	1
CIS Airplay (TopHit) Version without Nicki Minaj	16
Czech Republic Airplay (ČNS IFPI)	26
Italy (FIMI)	41
Latvia (Latvijas Top 40)	11
Mexico Airplay (Billboard)	47
Netherlands (Dutch Tipparade 40)	5
Netherlands (Single Tip)	26
New Zealand Heatseekers (RMNZ)	4
Poland Airplay (ZPAV)	31
Russia Airplay (Tophit)	1
Slovakia Airplay (ČNS IFPI)	63
Ukraine Airplay (Tophit)	80
US Bubbling Under Hot 100 (Billboard)	3
US Adult Pop Airplay (Billboard)	23
US Pop Airplay (Billboard)	28
Venezuela English (Record Report)	5
"*" indicates an unranked position.

=== Year-end charts ===
2017 year-end chart performance for "Kissing Strangers"
Chart (2017)	Position
Argentina Airplay (Monitor Latino)	68
CIS Airplay (Tophit)	8
Israel International Airplay (Media Forest)	22
Latvia Airplay (LaIPA)	39
Russia Airplay (Tophit)	8
Ukraine Airplay (Tophit)	122

== Certifications ==
Certifications and sales for "Kissing Strangers"
Region	Certification	Certified units/sales
Brazil (Pro-Música Brasil)	Gold	30,000^{‡}
Italy (FIMI)	Platinum	50,000^{‡}
^{‡} Sales+streaming figures based on certification alone.

== Release history ==
Release dates for "Kissing Strangers"
Region	Date	Format	Version	Label	Ref.
Various	April 14, 2017	Digital download	Original	Republic	
United States	April 18, 2017	Contemporary hit radio	Original	Republic	
Italy	April 21, 2017	Contemporary hit radio	Original	Universal	
Various	July 28, 2017	Digital download	Remix	Republic	
