= You're Not Alone =

You're Not Alone or You Are Not Alone may refer to:

== Music ==
=== Albums ===
- You Are Not Alone (Kinetics & One Love album), 2012
- You Are Not Alone (Mavis Staples album) or the title song, 2010
- You're Not Alone (Andrew W.K. album) or the title song, 2018
- You're Not Alone (Roy Buchanan album) or the title song, 1978
- You're Not Alone (OK Go and Bonerama EP), 2008
- You're Not Alone (Semisonic EP) or the title song, 2020

=== Songs ===
- "You Are Not Alone", by Michael Jackson, 1995
- "You Are Not Alone" (Modern Talking song), 1999
- "You're Not Alone" (Australian Olympians song), 1988
- "You're Not Alone" (Chicago song), 1988
- "You're Not Alone" (Embrace song), 2000
- "You're Not Alone" (The Enemy song), 2007
- "You're Not Alone" (Joe and Jake song), UK entry for Eurovision 2016
- "You're Not Alone" (Of Mice & Men song), 2013
- "You're Not Alone" (Olive song), 1996; also covered by ATB (2002), Mads Langer (2009), and Scotty Boy & Lizzie Curious (2017)
- "You're Not Alone" (Song4Syria), 2014
- "You're Not Alone" (Tinchy Stryder song), 2009
- "You Are Not Alone", by Adam Brand from Speed of Life, 2020
- "You Are Not Alone", by Anri from Timely!!, 1983
- "You Are Not Alone", by the Eagles from Long Road Out of Eden, 2007
- "You Are Not Alone", by Emeli Sandé from Real Life, 2019
- "You Are Not Alone", by Lil' Kim from 9, 2019
- "You're Not Alone", by Amy Grant from Heart in Motion, 1991
- "You're Not Alone", by Basshunter from Calling Time, 2013
- "You're Not Alone", by Big Time Rush from Elevate, 2011
- "You're Not Alone", by BWO from Big Science, 2009
- "You're Not Alone", by Downhere from Two at a Time: Sneak Peeks & B-Sides, 2010
- "You're Not Alone", by Dragonforce from Maximum Overload, 2014
- "You're Not Alone", by the Lottery Winners from Anxiety Replacement Therapy, 2023
- "You're Not Alone", by Meredith Andrews from The Invitation, 2008
- "You're Not Alone", by Owl City from Mobile Orchestra, 2015
- "You're Not Alone", by Saosin from Saosin, 2006
- "You're Not Alone", by Shaye from Lake of Fire, 2006
- "You're Not Alone", by Shayne Ward from Shayne Ward, 2006

== Other uses ==
- You Are Not Alone (book), a 2011 biography of Michael Jackson, by Jermaine Jackson
- You Are Not Alone (1978 film), a Danish coming-of-age story about two gay teens
- You Are Not Alone (2024 film), a Canadian romantic comedy science fiction film
- "You're Not Alone", an episode of Medical Investigation
- Evangelion: 1.0 You Are (Not) Alone, a 2007 Japanese anime

== See also ==
- Not Alone (disambiguation)
- We Are Not Alone (disambiguation)
