= People to People (EP) =

2018 EP by DNCE

EP by DNCE
- Released: June 15, 2018
- Genre: Funk pop
- Length: 13:05
- Label: Republic
- Producer: Ido Zmishlany; Robin Hannibal; Stuart Crichton

DNCE chronology
DNCE (2016)	People to People (2018)

People to People is the second extended play (EP) by the American band DNCE, released on June 15, 2018, through Republic Records. The production was handled by Robin Hannibal, Stuart Crichton, and Ido Zmishlany. The project marks a more serious sound from the band, which contrasts with earlier, more wackier releases.

The EP was the last project DNCE released before their hiatus, in which the lead singer Joe Jonas and drummer Jack Lawless resumed work with the Jonas Brothers in 2019. This also marked their last project with the bassist and keyboardist Cole Whittle, who did not return to DNCE after the band reunited in early 2022.

People to People received positive to mixed reviews from music critics, who noted its mature nature in comparison to the band's previous works. Jonas's vocals were generally praised, while the songs in the EP were considered good, but also forgettable.

== Background and promotion ==
DNCE released the single "Dance", on January 26, 2018. On the same day, they performed the song on the Ellen DeGeneres Show, which coincided with the host's birthday celebration. On April 6, the band made a featuring appearance on Italian record producer duo Merk & Kremont's single, "Hands Up". Then, on the days leading up to the EP's release, the band teased the upcoming songs on their Instagram account. On June 15, they released their second extended play, People to People, as a surprise release. The cover art was designed by the Mexican-American artist Carlos Ramirez.

In order to promote the record, on June 17, 2018, the band performed the first track from the EP, "TV in the Morning", on The Voice Australia season 7's finale, on which frontman Jonas was acting as a coach next to fellow singers Kelly Rowland, Delta Goodrem and Boy George. DNCE served as the opening act for Bruno Mars on the Latin America leg, as well as in select dates in Europe, for the 24K Magic World Tour (2017–18).

== Music ==
=== Lyrics and themes ===
These new songs represent the evolution that the band has gone through over the last couple of years. They're a little more chill, sophisticated. We've matured together, and so has the music.

– Joe Jonas on the songs featured on their new EP, via Entertainment Focus.

Billboard regarded the songs on the EP as showcasing DNCE in a "different, more serious side to their musicality", with the lead singer Joe Jonas singing about "different aspects of romance, from casual encounters to maintaining the strength of a good and solid relationship". On that regard, Jonas stated that the songs on the EP present a different and more serious side to the band, to which he commented: "I feel like musically, the band's come a long way", adding, "we released 'Cake by the Ocean' two years ago. It's fun, it's wacky, we're so proud of it, but there's a serious side to us as well".

=== Production ===
During an interview for the Official Charts Company, Jonas described the production process for the songs:

We didn’t overthink it, and as a result the songs came pretty quickly – not that we rushed it of course - but most songs were done in a couple of takes. We’re glad we didn’t spend months and months on them as in the past we’ve got bored of songs we’ve worked on for too, or you get 'demo lock', where you're not really sure how to finish the song.

— Jonas on producing People to People, Official Charts Company.

== Critical reception ==
The EP received positive to mixed reviews from critics, who positively commented on Joe Jonas's vocals and the record's funk-inspired sound, but noted that it has forgettable songs.

Talking about People to People, Official Charts Company's Rob Copsey wrote that those are "four solid pop offerings that show a band who aren't afraid to experiment", while noting Prince's funk influences and the playful lyrics. He described "TV in the Morning" as a "post-sex Prince inspired funk with playful lyrics" and also highlighted the minimalist production on "Lose My Cool", calling it "deceptively addictive". In a review for CelebMix, Katrina Rees wrote that the EP has elements that recall the band's previous works, but also displayed a significant maturity both sonically and lyrically. She added that the record is their "most cohesive body of work to date", showcasing a "slick, irresistible sound". Lastly, she praised Jonas's vocals, describing them as "superbly captivating".

Bleached's Thomas Bleach gave People to People a mixed review. He described the EP as "a more chilled out collection of tracks", which presents DNCE as a "little less chaotic" and delivers "smoother harmonies", but that it lacks the spark present on their previous songs. Although Bleach highlighted Jonas's vocals, he thought the songs were not memorable, calling "Lose My Cool" and "Man On Fire" "very experimental" and "ultimately forgettable". However, the writer pointed out the exception of "Still Good", which he called "vulnerable" and "heartfelt". Lauren Gribble of Listen Here Reviews noted the record's funk influences, and praised the lead singer's vocals. She described "Lose My Cool" as "a simplistic beat that allows the group to dive into a minimal pop song". Lastly, she noted that the EP kept the "constant colorful vibe" that the band showcased throughout their discography. The song "Dance" was described by website The Musical Hype as "fun and infectious" but "utterly corny", noting that it follows the formula of previous DNCE hits, which makes it worth listening to.

== Hiatus and subsequent releases ==
After the release of People to People, the band went on a hiatus. During this time Jonas and Lawless resumed work with the Jonas Brothers, following the brothers' reunion in 2019. The EP marked the last project to feature the bassist Cole Whittle, who did not return to the band on subsequent releases, in order to focus on solo material.

In 2022, DNCE resumed work with the release of "Dancing Feet", a collaboration with Norwegian record producer and DJ Kygo, released on February 25, 2022. Three months later, they released the single "Move", which marked their first solo song since the release of the People to People EP. On July 8, 2022, DNCE released the single "Got Me Good".

== Track listing ==
People to People track listing
No.	Title	Writer(s)	Producer(s)	Length
1.	"TV in the Morning"	Robin Hannibal; Cass Lowe	Hannibal	3:44
2.	"Still Good"	Hannibal; Stuart Crichton; Stephen Wrabel; Eric Leva	Hannibal; Crichton^{[a]}	3:21
3.	"Lose My Cool"	Freddy Wexler; Spencer Lee; Kevin Kesse	Ido Zmishlany	2:53
4.	"Man on Fire"	Joseph Jonas; Ido Zmishlany; Matthew Koma	Zmishlany	3:07
Total length:				13:05

Japanese bonus track
No.	Title	Writer(s)	Producer(s)	Length
5.	"Dance"	Jonas; John Ryan; Ammar Malik; Teddy Geiger; Ricky Reed; Neal Persiani; Cole Whittler	Reed	2:59
Total length:				16:04

Note

- ^[a] signifies an additional producer.

== Personnel ==
Credits are adapted from the album's liner notes.

=== DNCE ===
- Joe Jonas – vocals (all tracks); background vocals (2–5); songwriting (4, 5)
- Jack Lawless – drums (all tracks); background vocals (5)
- JinJoo Lee – guitar (all tracks); background vocals (3–5)
- Cole Whittle – bass (all tracks); guitar, songwriting (5); background vocals (3–5)

=== Additional musicians ===
- Robin Hannibal – production, songwriting, engineering, programming, percussion, keyboards, guitar (1, 2); bass, vocal editing (1)
- Cass Lowe – songwriting, background vocals, keyboards (1)
- Teira Lockhart – background vocals (1)
- Joel Van Dijk – guitar (1, 2)
- Stuart Crichton – additional production, songwriting, keyboards (2)
- Ido Zmishlany – production, background vocals, engineering, programming, keyboards (3, 4); drums (4)
- Jared Scharff – guitar (4)
- Matt Bair – guitar (4)
- Andrew Pertes – bass (4)
- Teddy Geiger – background vocals, songwriting (5)
- Ammar Malik – background vocals, songwriting (5)
- John Ryan – production, background vocals (5)
- Ricky Reed – production, background vocals, programming, guitar (5)

=== Technical ===
- Mark "Spike" Stent – mixing
- Michael Freeman – mixing assistance (all tracks)
- Robert Castillo – recording assistance (1, 2)
- Wrabel – songwriting (2)
- Eric Leva – songwriting (2)
- Freddy Wexler – songwriting (3, 4)
- Spencer Lee – songwriting (3, 4)
- Kevin Kesse – songwriting (3, 4)
- Matt Wolach – recording assistance (3, 4)
- Noah "Mailbox" Passovoy – engineering (4)
- Neal Persiani – songwriting (5)
- Ethan Shumaker – engineering (5)
- Serba Ghenea – mixing (5)

== Release history ==
People to People release history
Region	Date	Format	Label	Ref.
Worldwide	June 15, 2018	Digital download; streaming	Republic	
Japan	June 23, 2018	CD	Republic	
