= People to People =

People to People can refer to:

- People to People International, a non-profit group and recipient of the Knight of Peace Award
  - The People to People Student Ambassador Program, the student travel group associated with the above organization
- People to People (EP), 2018 DNCE EP

== See also ==
- "People Are People", Depeche Mode single
