= Not Alone =

Not Alone may refer to:

== Music ==
=== Albums ===
- Not Alone (album), a charity compilation album for Médecins Sans Frontières, 2006
- Not Alone – Rivers Cuomo and Friends: Live at Fingerprints, an EP by Rivers Cuomo, 2009

=== Songs ===
- "Not Alone" (Aram Mp3 song), Armenian entry for Eurovision 2014
- "Not Alone" (Bernard Butler song), 1998
- "Not Alone" (Linkin Park song), 2010
- "Not Alone" (Park Jung-min song), 2011
- "Not Alone" (Zhang Liyin song), 2014
- "Not Alone" (Seventeen song), 2021
- "Not Alone", by All That Remains from The Fall of Ideals, 2006
- "Not Alone", by Benjamin Kheng, a Singaporean patriotic song, 2024
- "Not Alone", by the Browning from Burn This World, 2011
- "Not Alone", by BTS from BTS World: Original Soundtrack, 2019
- "Not Alone", by Crossfaith from Apocalyze, 2013
- "Not Alone", by Dala from Best Day, 2012
- "Not Alone", by Fleur East, 2020
- "Not Alone", by Jesse LeProtti, the South Carolina entry in the American Song Contest, 2022
- "Not Alone", by Joe Jonas and Khalid, 2022
- "Not Alone", by Kate Ryan, 2014
- "Not Alone", by Kygo from Cloud Nine, 2016
- "Not Alone", by NCT 127 from Neo Zone, 2020
- "Not Alone", by Nobuo Uematsu from the Final Fantasy IX soundtrack, 2000
- "Not Alone", by Red from Until We Have Faces, 2011
- "Not Alone", by Starkill from Gravity, 2019
- "Not Alone", by Thrown into Exile from Thrown into Exile, 2013
- "Not Alone", by Withered Hand from New Gods, 2014
- "Not Alone", from A Very Potter Musical, 2009

== Other uses ==
- Not Alone (film), a 2027 animated film produced by Illumination

== See also ==
- "Not Alone Any More", a song by the Traveling Wilburys, 1988
- We Are Not Alone (disambiguation)
- You're Not Alone (disambiguation)
