= We Are Not Alone =

We Are Not Alone or We're Not Alone may refer to:

== Music ==
=== Albums ===
- We Are Not Alone (Breaking Benjamin album), 2004
- We Are Not Alone (StorySide:B album), 2007

=== Songs ===
- "We Are Not Alone", by Frank Zappa from The Man from Utopia
- "We Are Not Alone", by Karla DeVito from The Breakfast Club (Original Motion Picture Soundtrack)
- "We Are Not Alone", by Raffi from Evergreen Everblue
- "We're Not Alone", by Coldrain from Nothing Lasts Forever
- "We're Not Alone", by Dinosaur Jr. from Beyond
- "We're Not Alone", by Echosmith from Talking Dreams
- "We're Not Alone", by Nas from Untitled Nas album

== Media ==
- We Are Not Alone (novel), a 1937 novel by James Hilton
- We Are Not Alone (1939 film), based on Hilton's novel, starring Paul Muni
- We Are Not Alone (1993 film), a Japanese film directed by Yōjirō Takita
- "We Are Not Alone", an episode of 2004 TV series Powers
- We Are Not Alone (2022 film), a British made-for-television sci-fi comedy film

== Other uses ==
- We Are Not Alone, a 1964 book by Walter S. Sullivan
- We Are Not Alone, a support organization for former psychiatric patients

== See also ==
- Not Alone (disambiguation)
- You're Not Alone (disambiguation)
