= Hands Up (Merk & Kremont song) =

2018 single by Merk & Kremont featuring DNCE

Single by Merk & Kremont featuring DNCE
- Released: 6 April 2018
- Genre: Dance
- Length: 2:46
- Label: Universal Italy
- Songwriters: Federico Mercuri; Giordano Cremona; Joseph Jonas; Joshua Record; Anthony Whiting; Andrew Bullimore; Emily Phillips; Eugenio Maimone; Simone Privitera
- Producers: Merk; Kremont; Maimone; Simon Says

Merk & Kremont singles chronology
"Fire" (2018)	"Hands Up" (2018)	"Sushi" (2018)

DNCE singles chronology
"Dance" (2018)	"Hands Up" (2018)	"Dancing Feet" (2022)

Music video
- "Hands Up" on YouTube

"Hands Up" is a song by Italian record producer duo Merk & Kremont, featuring a guest appearance from American band DNCE. It was released through Universal Music Group Italy as a single on 6 April 2018. Production was handled by duo members Merk and Kremont, Eugenio Maimone, and Simon Says, while the vocals were solely handled by DNCE's lead singer, Joe Jonas. The producers and Jonas wrote the song alongside Josh Record, Ant Whiting, BullySongs, and Emily Phillips. The song debuted and peaked at number 56 in the duo's home country of Italy and was also certified platinum.

== Background ==
"Hands Up" is a "funked-up dance track" that sees Joe Jonas singing about "ditching a frustrating relationship" by ghosting the other person in that relationship who caused it to get worse, which causes him to be happy after escaping it and continue living life, especially in the song's chorus: "I throw my hands up / I've already made my mind up / Never get down on my luck / Never get on with my-y-y-y-y-y-y-y / Hands up / I've already made my mind up / Sorry I messed your life up / I'ma get on with mine-ine-ine-ine-ine-ine-ine-ine". A first listen was available on People the day before the release of the song, on 5 April 2018. Merk & Kremont brought out DNCE to perform the song in Milan, Italy, on the day of its release. DNCE announced the song alongside its cover art and release date on 28 March 2018. The official music video for "Hands Up", directed by Andrea Gallo, was released on 10 August 2018. While the people and settings are real, it also includes animations and drawings on real objects.

== Track listing ==
Digital download – Single

1. "Hands Up" (featuring DNCE) – 2:46

Digital download – Remixes EP

1. "Hands Up" (Neero Remix) (featuring DNCE) – 3:42
2. "Hands Up" (Brohug Remix) (featuring DNCE) – 3:27
3. "Hands Up" (Sunstars Remix) (featuring DNCE) – 3:30
4. "Hands Up" (Denis First & Reznikov Remix) (featuring DNCE) – 3:32
5. "Hands Up" (Ludwig Remix) (featuring DNCE) – 3:33
6. "Hands Up" (Raven & Kreyn Remix) (featuring DNCE) – 2:58

== Credits and personnel ==
- Merk & Kremont
  - Merk – production, songwriting
  - Kremont – production, songwriting
- DNCE
  - Joe Jonas – vocals, songwriting
  - Jack Lawless – drums
  - JinJoo Lee – guitar
  - Cole Whittle – bass
- Eugenio Maimone – production, songwriting
- Simon Says – production, songwriting
- BullySongs – background vocals, songwriting
- Ant Whiting – songwriting
- Emily Phillips – songwriting
- Josh Record – songwriting

== Charts ==
=== Weekly charts ===
2018 weekly chart performance for "Hands Up"
Chart (2018)	Peak position
Belarus Airplay (Eurofest)	1
CIS Airplay (TopHit)	4
Italy (FIMI)	56
Russia Airplay (TopHit)	1
Ukraine Airplay (TopHit)	2

2021–2026 weekly chart performance for "Hands Up"
Chart (2021–2026)	Peak position
Belarus Airplay (TopHit)	151
Kazakhstan Airplay (TopHit)	160
Russia Airplay (TopHit)	111
Russia Streaming (TopHit)	98
Ukraine Airplay (TopHit)	61

=== Monthly charts ===
2018 monthly chart performance
Chart (2018)	Peak position
CIS Airplay (TopHit)	5
Russia Airplay (TopHit)	4
Ukraine Airplay (TopHit)	4

2019 monthly chart performance
Chart (2019)	Peak position
CIS Airplay (TopHit)	30
Russia Airplay (TopHit)	46
Ukraine Airplay (TopHit)	4

=== Year-end charts ===
2018 year-end chart performance
Chart (2018)	Position
CIS Airplay (TopHit)	9
Russia Airplay (TopHit)	8
Ukraine Airplay (TopHit)	48

2019 year-end chart performance
Chart (2019)	Position
CIS Airplay (TopHit)	50
Russia Airplay (TopHit)	68
Ukraine Airplay (TopHit)	24

2020 year-end chart performance
Chart (2020)	Position
Ukraine Airplay (TopHit)	93

=== Decade-end charts ===
10s Decade-end chart performance
Chart (2010–2019)	Position
CIS Airplay (TopHit)	60
Russia Airplay (TopHit)	82
Ukraine Airplay (TopHit)	96

== Certifications ==
Region	Certification	Certified units/sales
Italy (FIMI)	Platinum	50,000^{‡}
^{‡} Sales+streaming figures based on certification alone.
