= Swaay =

2015 EP by DNCE

EP by DNCE
- Released: October 23, 2015
- Studio: Conway Recording (Hollywood); Wolf Cousins Studios (Stockholm); MXM Studios (Los Angeles)
- Genre: Funk pop; dance-rock; indie pop; indie rock
- Length: 14:18
- Label: Republic
- Producer: Ilya Salmanzadeh; Mattman & Robin; OzGo

DNCE chronology
Swaay (2015)	DNCE (2016)

Singles from Swaay
- 1. "Cake by the Ocean" Released: September 18, 2015; 2. "Toothbrush" Released: May 17, 2016

Swaay is the debut extended play (EP) by the American band DNCE, released on October 23, 2015, through Republic Records. It consists of four songs, two of which were produced by Ilya, one by the duo Mattman & Robin and the latter produced by OzGo. This marked a stylistic departure from Jonas' previous endeavors, solo and with the band.

The EP's release was supported by two singles, "Cake by the Ocean" and "Toothbrush", with the former peaking at number nine on the Billboard Hot 100 chart. In the United States, Swaay debuted at number 39 on the Billboard 200 and charted for 41 weeks.

Swaay was praised by music critics for its upbeat, funk-pop sound and its on 80's-influenced songs. To support the EP's release, the band embarked on The Greatest Tour Ever Tour, which ran for 13 shows, from November 2 to 20, 2015, across the United States and Canada.

== Background ==
It's tough for artists to get second chances in the music industry these days, and the fact that I get to do it with these guys who love music and are passionate and have a great time onstage is a dream come true [...] Getting a chance to come at it like a new artist and a new band is incredible.

— Joe Jonas on creating DNCE, via interview for Rolling Stone

Two years after the Jonas Brothers break up, former member Joe Jonas pitched the idea for a new group to Jack Lawless, whom he knew for about nine years from working as the drummer for the Jonas Brothers, and they decided it was the right time to start working on the new project. The duo then started working on some new music. While choosing the other band members, Jonas searched for familiar faces, picking JinJoo Lee as guitarist and Cole Whittle to play the keyboard and bass.

On September 10, 2015, Jonas announced the new project through an Instagram video. The post displayed the letters "D-N-C-E", before showing the band member exiting the ocean. The name for the band was taken from a lyric that Jonas wrote about "being too tipsy to spell dance". In an interview with Billboard, the former Jonas Brother explained he wanted to do something different from what he and his brothers released in the past.

In an interview with Complex, the band told that after they finished writing the song, everything started to come together more easily, and they had a sense of what kind of music they wanted to create. One of their goals as a band was to create music that doesn't take itself too serious, and that could possibly make people happy. The group highlighted that Earth, Wind & Fire, the Bee Gees and James Brown were sources of inspiration for them.

Jonas expressed that the new band was a second chance for him to explore his creative freedom. He further stated that he and his younger brother, Nick Jonas, were "very supportive of each other", explaining that DNCE's sound has a completely different style compared to Nick's solo career, and that there's a marketplace for both of them to succeed.

== Development ==
The first song they wrote for DNCE was "Cake by the Ocean". The group worked with Swedish producers Mattman & Robin and American songwriter Justin Tranter, and after a few days of "hanging out and having a few drinks", they came up with the song. Jonas further expressed that he never wanted the development process for the songs to feel heavy in the studio, and that he felt the "vibes were always really good" while recording the songs. Most of the songs were recorded in producer Max Martin's studios, both in Sweden and Los Angeles.

=== Lyrics and themes ===
The idea for the name of "Cake by the Ocean" came after Jonas overheard the producers say the phrase, and realize they were referring to the alcoholic cocktail, Sex on the Beach. It then became an innuendo for having sex. Jonas expressed that he felt the song embodied what DNCE really was. Jessiel Morris from Complex called the song a "funk-fueled jam", while remarking its resemble to the sound of "Get Lucky" (2013). The song was written by Jonas along with Justin Tranter and produced by Mattias Larsson and Robin Fredriksson—the Swedish duo known as Mattman & Robin.

"Toothbrush" is about leaving your toothbrush at your lover's place as a next step in the relationship. Brittany Spanos from Rolling Stone called the song "catchy" and "quirky". Writing for an interview with DNCE for the Los Angeles Times, Mikael Wood called the song an "effervescent disco jam" which features sexually charged lyrical content. During the interview, Jonas said that they "could've made it about how you left your T-shirt at someone's house, or your car keys", but they chose the toothbrush, for the wackiness of the concept.

USA Today wrote that "Pay My Rent" delivers a "jaunty Justin Timberlake-esque funk", which showcases that Jonas is learning from the veteran and former NSYNC member. Lastly, "Jinx", the only ballad present in the EP, was a last minute addition to the track list. Its lyrics talk about the critical moment in a relationship where one doesn't want to mess things up too soon.

== Release and promotion ==
The EP was announced along with the release of the music video for "Cake by the Ocean", where they also revealed the EP's cover, exclusively to Entertainment Weekly. It was released on October 23, 2015, through Republic Records.

=== Singles ===
"Cake by the Ocean" was released as the EP's lead single on September 18, 2015. The music video for the song was directed by Jonas then-girlfriend Gigi Hadid and Black Coffee, and features appearances by The Fat Jewish and Candice Huffine. The song charted at number one on Billboard's Adult Pop Songs chart. It also reached the Top 10 in five countries, the United States (where it peaked at number nine), United Kingdom, Australia, Canada, and Germany. "Cake by the Ocean" is certified 5× Platinum by the Recording Industry Association of America (RIAA). Billboard included "Cake by the Ocean" on their "100 Best Pop Songs of 2016" list.

"Toothbrush" was released as the second single from the EP, being serviced to contemporary hit radio on May 17, 2016. An accompanying music video for the song, directed by Luke Monaghan, was released on the same day. It stars American model Ashley Graham as Jonas' love interest. The video received praise from media outlets for challenging beauty standards and presenting a body-positive image. In the United States, "Toothbrush" was certified Platinum by the RIAA.

=== Touring ===
To further promote the EP, the band embarked on a 13-date tour, called The Greatest Tour Ever Tour, which ran from November 2 to 20, 2015 in cities across the US and Canada. All 13 scheduled dates for the tour were sold out. The Greatest Tour Ever Tour featured special guest, Powers, who also promoted their own EP, Legendary (2015). After their tour ended, DNCE toured alongside Selena Gomez, as the opening act for her Revival Tour, from May 6 to July 9, 2016.

== Commercial performance and reception ==
In the United States, Swaay peaked at number 39 on the US Billboard 200, and charted for 41 weeks. In 2016, it placed at number 83 on the US Billboard Year-End chart. The EP also peaked at number 18 on the Billboard Canadian Albums, charting for 37 weeks.

Upon release, Swaay received positive reviews from critics. Writing for Entertainment Weekly, Kyle Anderson found the EP a "solid step in the right direction" for Joe Jonas and his bandmates. He wrote that Swaay has a "spry, playful chemistry", with particular praise for the closing track, "Jinx". He also noted that the debut record reveals what kind of band DNCE wants to be and that they "got the chops and the instincts to carve out a funky, buoyant place on pop radio".

AllMusic's Matt Collar praised the EP, writing that it displays the band's "exuberant, catchy sound", which creates a "frenetic, party-oriented style of '80s-influenced dance-rock" sound. Richard Baxter of Popology Now described the first track as "one of the quirkiest pop songs of the year", stating that the other songs build off from "Cake by the Ocean", which would lead the listeners to the dance floors. He also noted that the closing song, "Jinx", shifted genres to an "indie pop/rock vibe" that he hoped the band would further explore. Baxter concluded by saying that the EP "provides just enough to leave us wanting more".

== Track listing ==
Swaay track listing
No.	Title	Writer(s)	Producer(s)	Length
1.	"Cake by the Ocean"	Joseph Jonas; Mattias Larsson; Robin Fredriksson; Justin Tranter	Mattman & Robin	3:39
2.	"Pay My Rent"	Jonas; Ilya Salmanzadeh; Rickard Göransson; James Ghaleb	Ilya	3:13
3.	"Toothbrush"	Jonas; Salmanzadeh; Göransson; Ghaleb	Ilya	3:51
4.	"Jinx"	Oscar Görres; Oscar Holter; Tranter	OzGo	3:36
Total length:				14:18

== Personnel ==
Credits are adapted from the album's liner notes.

=== DNCE ===
- Joe Jonas – lead vocals, background vocals (all tracks)
- Jack Lawless – drums, background vocals (2, 3)
- Cole Whittle – bass (2–4); background vocals (2, 3)
- JinJoo Lee – guitar, background vocals (2, 3)

=== Additional musicians ===
- James Ghaleb – guitar (3); background vocals, percussion (2, 3)
- Justin Tranter – background vocals (all tracks)
- Rickard Göransson – background vocals, bass (3); guitar, percussion (2, 3)
- Ilya – keyboards, percussion (3, 4); programming, production (2, 3)
- Mattman & Robin – background vocals, bass, drums, guitar, percussion (1, 2); programming (1–3); production (1)
- Oscar Görres – background vocals, guitar, production (4)
- Oscar Holter – background vocals, programming, production (4)
- Peter Carlsson – drums (2, 3)
- Frankie Jonas – background vocals (4)

=== Technical ===
- Serban Ghenea – mixing (all tracks)
- John Hanes – mixing assistance (1–3)
- Sam Holland – engineering (2, 3)
- John Cranfield – engineering (2–4)
- Cory Bice – engineering assistance (2, 3)
- Jeremy Lertola – engineering assistance (2, 3)

== Charts ==
=== Weekly charts ===
Weekly chart performance for Swaay
Chart (2016)	Peak position
Canadian Albums (Billboard)	18
Danish Albums (Hitlisten)	19
US Billboard 200	39

=== Year-end charts ===
2016 year-end chart performance for Swaay
Chart (2016)	Position
Canadian Albums (Billboard)	46
Danish Albums (Hitlisten)	59
US Billboard 200	83

== Certifications ==
Certifications for Swaay, with pure sales where available
Region	Certification	Certified units/sales
Australia (ARIA)	Platinum	70,000^{‡}
^{‡} Sales+streaming figures based on certification alone.

== Release history ==
Swaay release history
Region	Date	Format	Label	Ref.
Worldwide	October 23, 2015	digital download; streaming	Republic	
Worldwide	January 29, 2016	CD	Republic	
