= DNCE (album) =

Studio album by DNCE
- Released: November 18, 2016
- Genre: Dance-pop
- Length: 49:01
- Label: Republic
- Producer: Aaron Zuckerman; Albin Nedler; Ilya; Kristoffer Fogelmark; Mailbox; Mattman & Robin; OzGo; Oscar Holter; Rami; Sir Nolan

DNCE chronology
Swaay (2015)	DNCE (2016)	People to People (2018)

Singles from DNCE
- 1. "Body Moves" Released: September 30, 2016

DNCE is the debut studio album by American band DNCE. It was released through Republic Records on November 18, 2016. The album features a sole guest appearance from Kent Jones. Production was handled by Ilya, Rami Yacoub, Albin Nedler, Kristoffer Fogelmark, Mattman & Robin, OzGo, Oscar Holter, Sir Nolan, Mailbox, and Aaron Zuckerman. DNCE is a dance-pop album with influences of new wave, dance-rock, disco, and alternative pop. It was supported by only one single, "Body Moves", which was released on September 30, 2016. DNCE serves as the follow-up to the band's debut extended play, Swaay (2015), in which three of its songs are included on the album: singles "Cake by the Ocean" and "Toothbrush", and "Pay My Rent", while "Jinx" appears on its Japanese edition.

Upon release, the album was met with generally positive reviews from music critics, who praised lead singer Joe Jonas' maturity and the band's mainstream appeal. DNCE debuted in the top 20 on the Billboard 200, but performed only moderately well on the album charts in other countries, earning its highest international peak in Australia at number 32.

== Release and promotion ==
In February 2016, DNCE told PopCrush that they were nearly done recording the album and that it was to be released in August. However, the album's release was pushed back by three months to allow the band to properly promote the singles "Cake by the Ocean" and "Toothbrush" from their debut extended play, Swaay (2015), following their success. Billboard reported that recording was finished in August. The band announced the album's title and release date on September 14 through a promotional video. The lead and only single of the album, "Body Moves", was released on September 30, with its official music video being released on October 11. The band then released promotional singles every week during the three weeks directly preceding the album's release: "Blown" (which features Kent Jones) on October 28; "Good Day" on November 4; and "Be Mean" on November 11. "Cake by the Ocean", "Toothbrush", and "Pay My Rent" from Swaay are also included on the album, while "Jinx" appears on its Japanese edition.

== Critical reception ==
Professional ratings
Aggregate scores
Source	Rating
Metacritic	77/100
Review scores
Source	Rating
AllMusic	4/5 stars
Entertainment Weekly	B
Idolator	3/5 stars
The National	3.5/5 stars
Newsday	A−
NME	3/5 stars
Rolling Stone	3.5/5 stars

DNCE received generally favorable reviews from music critics. At Metacritic, which assigns a normalized rating out of 100 to reviews from mainstream publications, it received an average score of 77, based on 4 reviews. Matt Collar of AllMusic wrote that "it's [the band's] stylistically open-minded approach to pop that makes DNCE such a joyous and undeniably fun album." Collar also complimented frontman Joe Jonas for being a "deeply self-aware and confident performer." Nolan Feeney of Entertainment Weekly commented on a lack of clear identity on the album, but conceded that the group "ultimately finds its groove with retro, funk-heavy tracks like new single "Body Moves" and "Blown,"" grading the album a B. Writing for Rolling Stone, Brittany Spanos called the album "a mature spin on the boy band formula that worked so well for Jonas and his brothers in the past," and wrote that "DNCE's greatest strength is never taking themselves too seriously." Rachel Sonis of Idolator gave the album a mixed review, writing that "there's real potential" on the album, but that too many tracks feel "forced" or "like fillers." Newsday rated the song an A−, with reviewer Glenn Gamboa writing that the album represents "lighthearted dance pop done right." Si Hawkins of The National wrote that "DNCE is enormous fun, chock-full of exactly what you hope for when buying an album as a result of one big hit: more of the same," and also praised Jonas' vocals.

== Commercial performance ==
DNCE debuted at number 17 on the Billboard 200 chart dated December 10, 2016 with approximately 25,000 album-equivalent units.

== Track listing ==
Standard edition track listing
No.	Title	Writer(s)	Producer(s)	Length
1.	"DNCE"	Joseph Jonas; Ilya Salmanzadeh; Justin Tranter; Rickard Göransson; James Ghaleb	Ilya	3:50
2.	"Body Moves"	Jonas; Rami Yacoub; Albin Nedler; Kristoffer Fogelmark	Rami; Nedler; Fogelmark	3:56
3.	"Cake by the Ocean"	Jonas; Tranter; Mattias Larsson; Robin Fredriksson	Mattman & Robin	3:39
4.	"Doctor You"	Jonas; Oscar Görres; Oscar Holter; Ghaleb	OzGo; Holter	3:12
5.	"Toothbrush"	Jonas; Salmanzadeh; Göransson; Ghaleb	Ilya	3:51
6.	"Blown" (featuring Kent Jones)	Jonas; Daryl Jones; Görres; Holter; Tranter; Paul Shelton II	OzGo; Holter	3:17
7.	"Good Day"	Jonas; Tranter; Fredriksson; Larsson	Mattman & Robin	3:38
8.	"Almost"	Jonas; Nolan Lambroza; Simon Wilcox; Dewain Whitmore Jr.; Neal Persiani	Sir Nolan	2:55
9.	"Naked"	Jonas; Tranter; Larsson; Fredriksson	Mattman & Robin; OzGo	3:56
10.	"Truthfully"	Jonas; Tranter; Yacoub; Nedler; Fogelmark	Rami; Nedler; Fogelmark; Mailbox^{[a]}	3:02
11.	"Be Mean"	Jonas; Görres; Holter; Ghaleb	OzGo; Holter	3:31
12.	"Zoom"	Jonas; Tranter; Salmanzadeh; Göransson	Ilya; Mailbox	3:41
13.	"Pay My Rent"	Jonas; Salmanzadeh; Göransson; Ghaleb	Ilya	3:13
14.	"Unsweet"	Jonas; Lambroza; Zuckerman; Wilcox; Whitmore; Persiani	Sir Nolan; Zuckerman^{[a]}	3:20
Total length:				49:01

Target exclusive and Japanese version
No.	Title	Writer(s)	Producer(s)	Length
15.	"Jinx"	Görres; Holter; Tranter	OzGo	3:36
16.	"Cake by the Ocean" (live)	Jonas; Tranter; Larsson; Fredriksson	Mattman & Robin	4:51
17.	"Body Moves" (live)	Jonas; Yacoub; Nedler; Fogelmark	Rami; Nedler; Fogelmark	3:57
Total length:				61:25

Jumbo edition
No.	Title	Writer(s)	Producer(s)	Length
18.	"Kissing Strangers" (featuring Nicki Minaj)	Onika Maraj; Tranter; Larsson; Fredriksson	Mattman & Robin	3:23
19.	"Good Day" (Sekai no Owari Remix)	Jonas; Tranter; Larsson; Fredriksson	Mattman & Robin	4:02
20.	"Hollow" (featuring Sekai no Owari)	Jonas; Satoshi Fukase; Shinichi Nakashima; Saori Ikeda; DJ Love; Christopher Baran	CJ Baran	3:02
Total length:				71:52

Notes

- ^{^[a]} signifies a co-producer

== Personnel ==
DNCE

- Joe Jonas – lead vocals (all tracks), background vocals (1, 3, 4, 6–9, 11, 13, 14)
- JinJoo Lee – guitar (1, 2, 4, 6–14), background vocals (2, 4, 6–9, 11–14)
- Cole Whittle – bass (1, 2, 4, 6–14), background vocals (2, 4, 6–9, 11–14)
- Jack Lawless – drums (1, 2, 6–14), background vocals (2, 4, 6–9, 11–14), percussion (10, 12)

Additional musicians

- James Ghaleb – background vocals (1, 4, 5, 7, 11); guitar, percussion (5)
- Justin Tranter – background vocals (1, 3, 6, 7, 9, 12, 13)
- Rickard Göransson – background vocals, bass, guitar (1, 5, 12); percussion (1, 5)
- Ilya – keyboards, percussion, programming (1, 5, 12); bass (1, 12); background vocals, guitar (12)
- Albin Nedler – programming (2, 10), background vocals (2), vocal arrangement (10)
- Kristoffer Fogelmark – background vocals, drums, guitar, programming (2, 10); percussion, vocal arrangement (10)
- Jonas Thander – horn arrangement, saxophones (2)
- Rami Yacoub – programming (2, 10); bass, percussion, vocal arrangement (10)
- Staffan Findin – trombone (2)
- Patrik Skogh – trumpet (2)
- Stefan Persson – trumpet (2)
- Mattman & Robin – background vocals, bass, drums, guitar, percussion, programming (3, 7, 9, 13); tambourine (7, 9), synthesizer programming (9)
- Oscar Görres – background vocals, bass, guitar (4, 6, 11); percussion, tambourine (4, 11); keyboards, programming (6)
- Oscar Holter – background vocals, programming (4, 6, 11); percussion, synthesizer programming, tambourine (4, 11); bass, guitar, keyboards (6)
- Peter Carlsson – drums (5)
- Frankie Jonas – background vocals (6)
- Paul Phamous – background vocals (6)
- Jake Faun – guitar (8)
- Torin Martinez – guitar (8)
- Nolan Lambroza – programming (8, 14)
- Noah "Mailbox" Passovoy – percussion (10, 12); guitar, keyboards, programming (12)
- Max Martin – vocal arrangement (10)

Technical

- Serban Ghenea – mixing (1–7, 9–13)
- Tony Maserati – mixing (8, 14)
- John Hanes – engineering (1, 2, 4, 7, 9–12), mixing assistance (3, 13)
- Noah "Mailbox" Passovoy – engineering (1, 2, 4, 6, 7, 9–12)
- Sam Holland – engineering (1, 5, 11), engineering assistance (12)
- Ben Sedano – engineering (1, 4, 6, 11)
- Albin Nedler – engineering (2, 10)
- Kristoffer Fogelmark – engineering (2, 10)
- Rami – engineering (2, 10)
- John Cranfield – engineering (7, 9, 13)
- Nolan Lambroza – engineering (8, 14)
- Derrick Stockwell – engineering (9), engineering assistance (12)
- Thomas Cullison – engineering (10)
- Ilya – engineering (12)
- Cory Bice – engineering assistance (1, 5, 12)
- Jeremy Lertola – engineering assistance (1, 5, 12)
- David Kim – engineering assistance (10)
- Eric Eylands – engineering assistance (12)

== Charts ==
Chart performance for DNCE
Chart (2016)	Peak position
Australian Albums (ARIA)	32
Belgian Albums (Ultratop Flanders)	126
Belgian Albums (Ultratop Wallonia)	73
Canadian Albums (Billboard)	43
French Albums (SNEP)	166
Irish Albums (IRMA)	76
Japanese Albums (Oricon)	43
New Zealand Heatseekers Albums (RMNZ)	3
Scottish Albums (OCC)	64
Spanish Albums (Promusicae)	86
Swiss Albums (Schweizer Hitparade)	89
UK Albums (OCC)	48
US Billboard 200	17

== Certifications ==
Certifications for DNCE
Region	Certification	Certified units/sales
Brazil (Pro-Música Brasil)	Gold	20,000^{‡}
Denmark (IFPI Danmark)	Gold	10,000^{‡}
Mexico (AMPROFON)	Gold	30,000^{^}
New Zealand (RMNZ)	Platinum	15,000^{‡}
Poland (ZPAV)	Gold	10,000^{‡}
Singapore (RIAS)	Gold	5,000^{*}
United States (RIAA)	Gold	500,000^{‡}
^{*} Sales figures based on certification alone.^{^} Shipments figures based on certification alone.^{‡} Sales+streaming figures based on certification alone.
