= Body Moves =

2016 single by DNCE

Single by DNCE

from the album DNCE
- Released: September 30, 2016
- Genre: Dance-pop
- Length: 3:56
- Label: Republic
- Songwriters: Joseph Jonas; Justin Tranter; Rami Yacoub; Albin Nedler; Kristoffer Fogelmark
- Producers: Rami; Nedler; Fogelmark

DNCE singles chronology
"Toothbrush" (2016)	"Body Moves" (2016)	"Kissing Strangers" (2017)

Music video
- "Body Moves" on YouTube

"Body Moves" is a song by American band DNCE. It was released through Republic Records as the lead and only single from their self-titled debut studio album on September 30, 2016. The band's lead singer, Joe Jonas, wrote the song alongside Justin Tranter and producers Rami Yacoub, Albin Nedler, and Kristoffer Fogelmark. "Body Moves" is a dance-pop song.

== Critical reception ==
Robbie Daw of Idolator commented on the influence of Justin Timberlake's solo debut, Justified (2002), on the track's sound and wrote that "Body Moves" is "a tune that's not only a worth follow-up... but actually manages to top both of its successors."

== Music videos ==
The promotional music video set to the song premiered October 5, 2016 which also doubled as an advertisement for a line of Victoria's Secret lingerie, the video includes models Behati Prinsloo, Taylor Hill, Jasmine Tookes, Sara Sampaio, Elsa Hosk and Josephine Skriver. The official music video for "Body Moves" was directed by Hannah Lux Davis and premiered October 11, 2016. Described by critics as "provocative," the video finds Joe Jonas shirtless and engaging in sexual behaviour with model Charlotte McKinney in an elevator, amongst other clips of the band members and "barely clothed" dancers.

== Live performances ==
DNCE appeared on The Today Show on August 26, 2016, and performed "Body Moves", along with "Cake by the Ocean" and "Toothbrush".

== Credits and personnel ==
- Recording engineer – Noah "Mailbox" Passovoy
- Background vocalist, drums, guitar, programmer, recording engineer, producer, lyricist, composer – Kristoffer Fogelmark
- Background vocalist, programmer, recording engineer, producer, lyricist, composer – Albin Nedler
- Mixer – Serban Ghenea
- Engineer – John Hanes
- Programmer, recording engineer, producer, lyricist, composer – Rami Yacoub
- Background vocalist, drums – Jack Lawless
- Background vocalist, bass – Cole Whittle
- Background vocalist, guitar – JinJoo Lee
- Vocalist, lyricist, composer – Joe Jonas
- Horn arranger, saxophones – Jonas Thander
- Trombone – Staffan Findin
- Trumpet – Stefan Persson
- Trumpet – Patrik Skogh
- Lyricist, composer – Justin Tranter

== Chart performance ==
=== Weekly charts ===
Chart (2016–17)	Peak position
Australia (ARIA)	62
Belgium (Ultratip Bubbling Under Wallonia)	5
Hungary (Rádiós Top 40)	30
Hungary (Single Top 40)	34
Japan Hot 100 (Billboard)	46
Japan Hot Overseas (Billboard)	2
Mexico Ingles Airplay (Billboard)	8
New Zealand Heatseekers (Recorded Music NZ)	2
Scotland Singles (OCC)	42
Slovakia Airplay (ČNS IFPI)	89
Sweden (Sverigetopplistan)	96
UK Singles (OCC)	99
US Dance Club Songs (Billboard)	2
US Pop Airplay (Billboard)	30

=== Year-end Charts ===
Chart (2017)	Position
US Dance Club Songs (Billboard)	28

== Certifications ==
Region	Certification	Certified units/sales
Brazil (Pro-Música Brasil)	Gold	30,000^{‡}
^{‡} Sales+streaming figures based on certification alone.

== Release history ==
Country	Date	Format	Label	Ref.
Worldwide	September 30, 2016	Digital download	Republic	
United States	October 4, 2016	Contemporary hit radio	Republic	
United States	October 17, 2016	Hot adult contemporary	Republic	
Italy	November 4, 2016	Contemporary hit radio	Universal	
