= You're Not Alone (Song4Syria) =

Single
- Released: 2014

"You're Not Alone", full title "Song4Syria: You're Not Alone", is a charity single of ChildrenPlus with proceeds going to the children victims of the Syrian Civil War. The song is performed by nine Muslim nasheed and rap artists: Abdullah Rolle, Faisal Salah, Omar Esa, Khaleel Muhammad, Hassen Rasool, Muslim Belal, Abdul Wahab (also known as UK Apache), Umar Salaams and Masikah and the song is introduced by Ajmal Masroor, Chairman of ChildrenPlus charity. In accordance with more strict interpretations of music in Islam, no musical instruments were used for the recording except for usage of some percussion instruments, such as the daff.

== Charts ==
The release has charted at number 13 in UK's "Asian Download Top 40" published by the Official Charts Company on the chart dated 22 March 2014.
