= Toothbrush (song) =

2016 single by DNCE

Single by DNCE

from the EP Swaay
- Released: May 17, 2016
- Length: 3:51
- Label: Republic
- Songwriters: Joseph Jonas; Ilya Salmanzadeh; James Ghaleb; Rickard Göransson
- Producer: Ilya

DNCE singles chronology
| "Rock Bottom" (2016) | "Toothbrush" (2016) | "Body Moves" (2016) |

Music video
- "Toothbrush" on YouTube

"Toothbrush" is a song by American band DNCE. It was sent to contemporary hit radio on May 17, 2016, as the second and final single from their debut extended play, Swaay (2015). It was also included on their self-titled debut studio album, which was released in 2016. The song was written by the band's lead singer, Joe Jonas, and producer Ilya, alongside James Ghaleb and Rickard Göransson.

== Music video ==
An accompanying music video for "Toothbrush" was directed by Luke Monaghan and premiered May 17, 2016. Featuring model Ashley Graham as Jonas' love interest, the video has received praise for presenting a body-positive image.

== Personnel ==
- Mixer: Serban Ghenea
- Assistant Mixer: John Hanes
- Engineer: Sam Holland
- Assistant Recording Engineer: Cory Bice
- Assistant Recording Engineer: Jeremy Lertola
- Programming, Producer, Keyboards, Percussion, Lyricist, Composer: Ilya Salmanzadeh
- Drums: Peter Carlsson
- Percussion, Lyricist, Composer, Background Vocalist, Guitar: James Alan Ghaleb
- Bass, Percussion, Lyricist, Composer, Guitar: Rickard Göransson
- Lyricist, Composer: Joe Jonas

== Charts ==
Weekly chart performance for "Toothbrush"
| Chart (2016) | Peak position |
|---|---|
| Australia (ARIA) | 33 |
| Belgium (Ultratip Bubbling Under Flanders) | 40 |
| Belgium (Ultratip Bubbling Under Wallonia) | 43 |
| Canada Hot 100 (Billboard) | 36 |
| Canada CHR/Top 40 (Billboard) | 27 |
| Canada Hot AC (Billboard) | 32 |
| Czech Republic Singles Digital (ČNS IFPI) | 67 |
| Hungary (Rádiós Top 40) | 16 |
| Hungary (Single Top 40) | 35 |
| Ireland (IRMA) | 65 |
| Netherlands (Global Top 40) | 38 |
| Netherlands (Single Tip) | 12 |
| Netherlands (Tipparade) | 16 |
| Portugal (AFP) | 86 |
| Scotland Singles (OCC) | 47 |
| Slovakia Airplay (ČNS IFPI) | 58 |
| Slovakia Singles Digital (ČNS IFPI) | 60 |
| Sweden Heatseeker (Sverigetopplistan) | 10 |
| UK Singles (OCC) | 49 |
| US Billboard Hot 100 | 44 |
| US Adult Pop Airplay (Billboard) | 32 |
| US Dance/Mix Show Airplay (Billboard) | 34 |
| US Pop Airplay (Billboard) | 18 |

Year-end chart rankings for "Toothbrush"
| Chart (2016) | Position |
|---|---|
| Netherlands (Global Top 40) | 96 |

== Certifications ==
| Region | Certification | Certified units/sales |
|---|---|---|
| Australia (ARIA) | Gold | 35,000^{‡} |
| Brazil (Pro-Música Brasil) | Platinum | 60,000^{‡} |
| New Zealand (RMNZ) | Gold | 15,000^{‡} |
| United Kingdom (BPI) | Silver | 200,000^{‡} |
| United States (RIAA) | Platinum | 1,000,000^{‡} |
^{‡} Sales+streaming figures based on certification alone.

== Release history ==
| Region | Date | Format | Label | Ref. |
|---|---|---|---|---|
| United States | October 23, 2015 | Digital download | Republic | |
| United States | May 17, 2016 | Contemporary hit radio | Republic | |
