= DNCE =

American dance-rock band

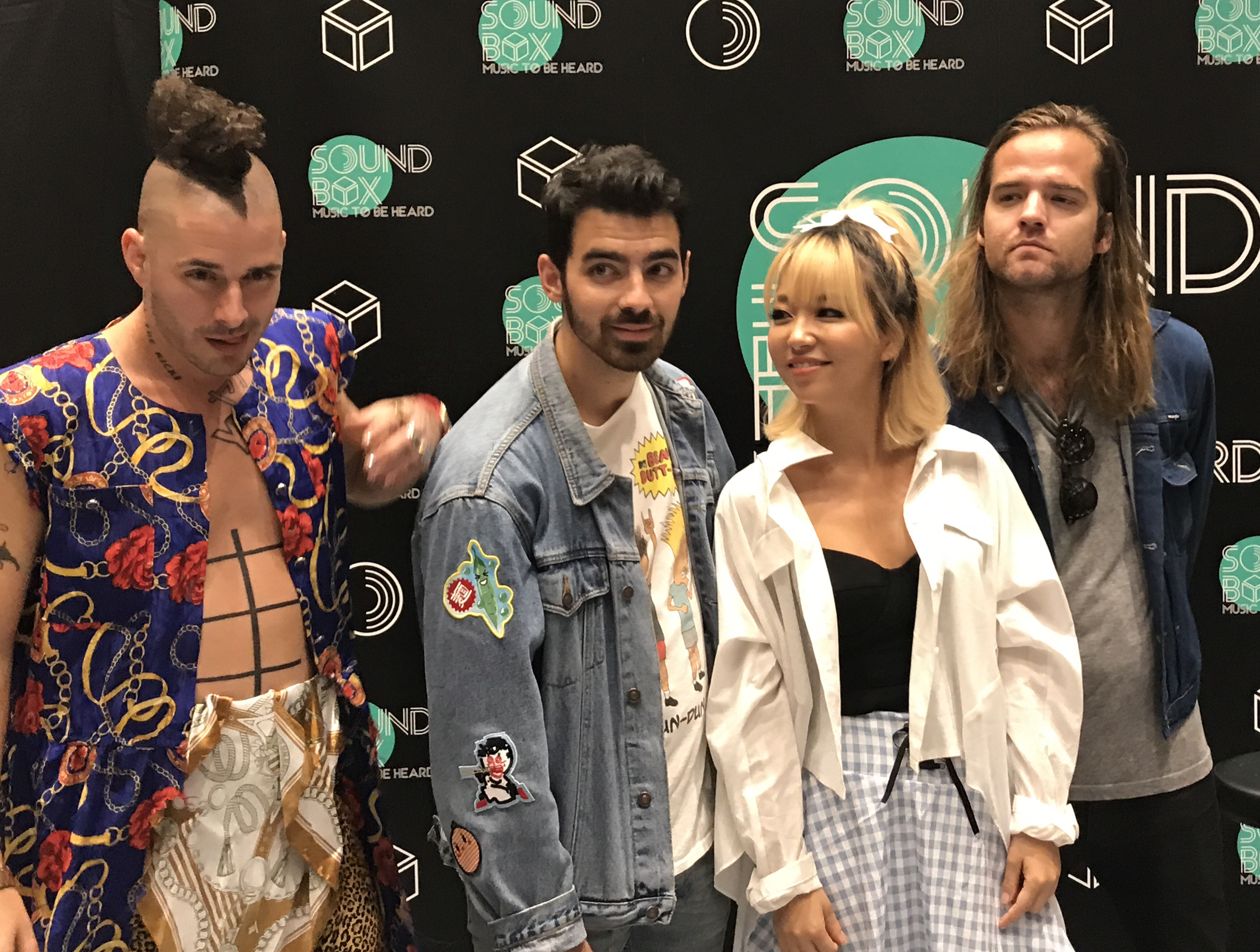
- Original lineup of DNCE at Soundbox in 2017

Background information
- Origin: Los Angeles, California, U.S.
- Genres: Dance-rock; dance-pop; pop rock; funk-pop; alternative rock
- Years active: 2015–2019; 2022–2024
- Label: Republic
- Spinoff of: Jonas Brothers; Semi Precious Weapons
- Past members: Joe Jonas; Jack Lawless; JinJoo Lee; Cole Whittle
- Website: dnce.com

DNCE was an American dance-rock band consisting of lead singer Joe Jonas, drummer Jack Lawless, and guitarist JinJoo Lee. Bassist and keyboardist Cole Whittle was a part of the band from when they formed in 2015 to when they went on hiatus in 2019. DNCE's music is mainly dance-rock, dance-pop, pop rock, and funk-pop. The band signed with Republic Records and released their debut single, "Cake by the Ocean", on September 18, 2015. The song reached the top 10 on several charts, including on the US Billboard Hot 100, where it peaked at number nine. The band's second single, "Toothbrush", was moderately successful.

Their debut extended play (EP), Swaay, was released on October 23, 2015. It peaked at number 39 on the Billboard 200 and was certified platinum. After appearing on the positively-received Grease Live!, their self-titled debut studio album was released on November 18, 2016 and peaked at number 17 on the Billboard 200, earning a gold certification. Their second EP, People to People, was released on June 15, 2018, but did not chart. The band was also nominated for Favorite New Artist for the 2016 Kids' Choice Awards and Best Song to Lip Sync and Best Anthem for the 2016 Radio Disney Music Awards, and performed at the 2017 Fashion Meets Music Festival.

In 2018, after People to People and their non-album single "Dance" had limited success, the band went on an indefinite hiatus. After the group went on a hiatus, Jonas rejoined the Jonas Brothers and Lee began performing with acts such as Charli XCX. In February 2022, DNCE returned (albeit, without Whittle) after their hiatus, with a collaboration with Kygo titled "Dancing Feet". The band released three more songs afterwards ("Move", "Got Me Good", and "Flamingo", the latter for the movie Anything's Possible) before going on hiatus once again in 2024.

== Career ==
=== 2015: Background and origins ===
Lead singer Joe Jonas originally rose to fame as a member of the band the Jonas Brothers, alongside his brothers, Nick and Kevin. Both guitarist JinJoo Lee and drummer Jack Lawless were, for varying tenures, a part of the Jonas Brothers' live backing band, playing guitar and drums respectively. The idea for DNCE first came about while Jonas and Lawless were living together, although the project was put on hold due to the duo's respective busy schedules. Jonas, Lawless, and Lee officially came together to form DNCE in 2015.

Though work on music had already begun, the group struggled to find a fourth member to fit into the band. Jonas began working with American singer-songwriter Justin Tranter for DNCE's music. This led to the friendship of Jonas and bassist and keyboardist Cole Whittle, the now-former bassist in Tranter's band, Semi Precious Weapons. Ultimately, Whittle was added as a full-time member of the band. The group named themselves DNCE, which lyrically spoke of being too drunk to spell the word "dance". Jonas later added that the group decided on the name as it described the "imperfect awesome[ness] of the four of [them] together." Lee later added that "much like the spelling of the word, you don't have to be a perfect dancer to dance in life."

=== 2015–2016: Initial releases and success ===
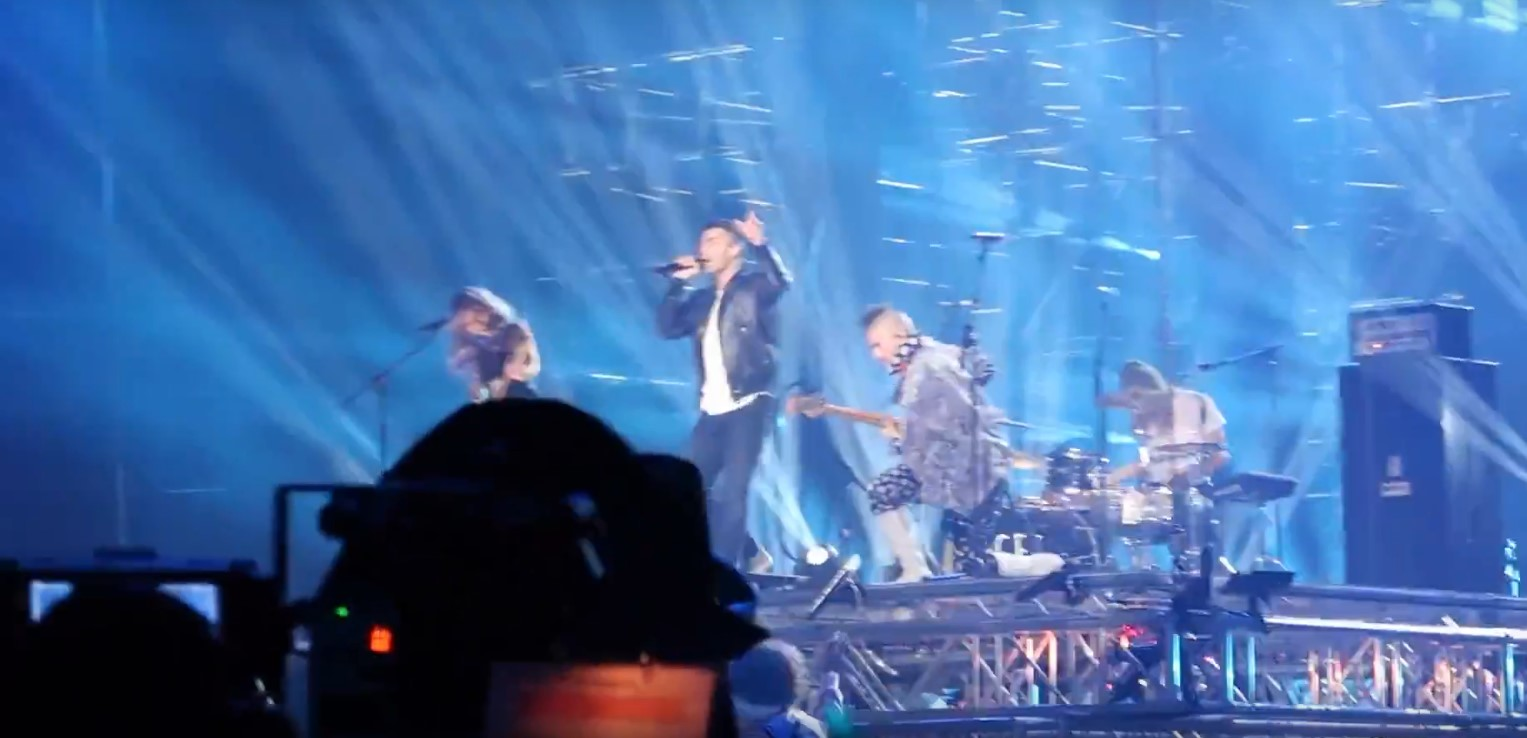
DNCE performing at the 2016 MTV Europe Music Awards (in order from left to right; JinJoo Lee, Joe Jonas, Cole Whittle, Jack Lawless)

The group began performing secret shows in New York City to rehearse for their upcoming tour and promotional performances. DNCE made an official Instagram account in September 2015 and Jonas later posted a teaser video for the band on his account, tagging the band's official page, on September 10, 2015. The band released their debut single, "Cake by the Ocean", on September 18, 2015. Though starting out slow, the song managed to reach the top 10 across several charts, including a number nine peak on the Billboard Hot 100. The band released their debut extended play, Swaay, on October 23, 2015. The band embarked on a 14-date tour in November 2015, known as the Greatest Tour Ever. All 14 scheduled dates for the tour sold out. The tour received critical praise, and featured unreleased songs as well as covers of older classics.

On January 31, 2016, DNCE made a cameo during Fox's television special Grease: Live; a live production of the Broadway musical Grease. The band performed as Johnny Casino and the Gamblers during a high school dance scene, which incorporated a 1950s-inspired rendition of "Cake by the Ocean" and a cover of the Crickets' "Maybe Baby" alongside the Grease songs "Born to Hand Jive" and "Rock & Roll Is Here to Stay". In an interview with Rolling Stone, Jonas explained that DNCE was approached by the producers of the special following a show in New York City, and that he had always been a fan of Grease. In February 2016, the band joined American singer Selena Gomez as opening acts for her Revival Tour. On February 26, 2016, DNCE was featured on American singer and actress Hailee Steinfeld's single, "Rock Bottom", from the update of her debut extended play, Haiz, which was then considered the main version of the song. On April 22, 2016, the group appeared on BBC One's The Graham Norton Show, performing "Cake by the Ocean". "Toothbrush" was chosen as the second single from Swaay, being sent to contemporary hit radio on May 17, 2016. The song peaked at number 44 on the Billboard Hot 100.

On September 14, 2016, DNCE announced their self-titled debut studio album and its release date. The album includes three songs from Swaay: "Cake by the Ocean", "Toothbrush", and "Pay My Rent", while the last song from the EP, "Jinx" only stayed on the EP. The lead single of the album, "Body Moves", was released on September 30. Three promotional singles were subsequently released for three Fridays in a row: "Blown" (featuring Kent Jones) on October 28, "Good Day" on November 4, and "Be Mean" on November 11. The album was released on November 18, the next Friday. On April 14, 2017, the band released the single "Kissing Strangers", featuring Trinidadian-American rapper Nicki Minaj. The single was released on the "Jumbo Edition" of the album, alongside two additional remixes of "Good Day" and "Hollow" and three bonus tracks from the Target-exclusive version. On August 25, 2017, DNCE was featured on a remade version of British singer-songwriter Rod Stewart's single, "Da Ya Think I'm Sexy?".

=== 2018–2019: People to People and hiatus ===
To start out 2018, DNCE released the non-album single, "Dance" on January 26. This release was the first single from the band (as a main artist) to not chart at all. On April 6, they were featured on Italian record producer duo Merk & Kremont's single, "Hands Up", which only hit number 42 on Italy's FIMI Singles Chart, although it was certified platinum in that country. On June 15, they released their second extended play, People to People. The EP, although positively-received by critics, did not hit any chart. It would later be released in Japan with "Dance" as a bonus track.

On February 28, 2019, the Jonas Brothers announced their comeback, in which Jonas and Lawless resumed work with them, which caused DNCE to go on hiatus for more than three years. The Jonas Brothers' comeback would be more successful than DNCE's recent endeavors, with the band's comeback single "Sucker" debuting at number 1 on the Billboard Hot 100, alongside hitting number one on four other charts. Even after DNCE's breakup, however, The Jonas Brothers have frequently performed "Cake by the Ocean" in their live set. Lawless and Lee joined the Jonas Brothers in their backing band for their Remember This Tour from August to October 2021 before DNCE reunited, in which they added "Toothbrush" to the set.

=== 2022–2024: Reformation and second hiatus ===
On February 7, 2022, DNCE announced their return, in which Cole Whittle did not return to the band as he started his solo music career when they were on hiatus. On February 25, 2022, DNCE was featured on Norwegian record producer and DJ Kygo's single "Dancing Feet", as their comeback single. On May 6, 2022, they released the single "Move". On July 8, 2022, they released the single "Got Me Good". Exactly two weeks later, on July 22, 2022, DNCE released the song "Flamingo" as part of the soundtrack for the movie Anything's Possible. After limited success from their comeback and the absence of releases since "Flamingo", the band would go on hiatus again in 2024.

The band briefly returned in 2024 to release a remix of Joe Jonas' song "Work It Out" alongside a compilation EP including a number of their previous singles.

== Artistry ==
In 2016, band member Cole Whittle said, "Musically, we sound like disco funk hits played by a good garage band." The band's influences included the Electric Light Orchestra, Sly and the Family Stone, Weezer, Earth, Wind & Fire, Hall & Oates, Prince, the Bee Gees, and Led Zeppelin.

== Members ==
- Joe Jonas: lead vocals – Jonas first rose to prominence as a member of the Jonas Brothers, a band that has considerable success across music, film and television.
- Jack Lawless: drums, percussion, backing vocals – Jack Lawless played drums for the Jonas Brothers from their Marvelous Party Tour (2007) until their disbandment, and again from their 2019 reunion onwards. Lawless and Jonas were roommates, with Lawless continuing to perform with the band on subsequent tours. In 2010, Lawless became the drummer for alternative rock band Ocean Grove; the group released their debut extended play in 2011.
- JinJoo Lee: guitar, backing vocals – Lee is from South Korea and, like Lawless, has previously toured with acts such as the Jonas Brothers, playing the guitar. She was a member of CeeLo Green's touring band from 2010 to 2011, and later worked with JoJo and Charli XCX.
- Cole Whittle: bass guitar, keyboards, backing vocals – Whittle rose to fame as the bassist for Semi Precious Weapons. The band released three studio albums during their run, with their final release coming in 2014. He has also recently contributed as a songwriter, alongside fellow Semi Precious Weapons member Justin Tranter. Whittle did not return to DNCE when they reunited in 2022 in order to focus on his solo career.

== Discography ==
=== Studio albums ===
- DNCE (2016)

=== Extended plays ===
- Swaay (2015)
- People to People (2018)
- Music for People Who Believe in DNCE (2024)

== Filmography ==
Television
Year	Title	Role	Notes
2016	Grease: Live	Johnny Casino and the Gamblers	Television special

== Tours ==
=== Headlining ===
- The Greatest Tour Ever Tour (2015–2016)
- DNCE in Concert (2017)
- DNCE GOGO SAIKO Japan Tour (2017)

=== As opening act ===
- Revival Tour (Selena Gomez) (2016)
- 24K Magic World Tour (Bruno Mars) (2017–2018)

== Awards and nominations ==
Year	Award	Category	Nominee	Result
2016	American Music Awards	Favorite Pop/Rock Band/Duo/Group	DNCE	Nominated
2016	American Music Awards	New Artist of the Year	DNCE	Nominated
2016	Kids' Choice Awards	Favorite New Artist	DNCE	Nominated
2016	Radio Disney Music Awards	Best Anthem	"Cake by the Ocean"	Nominated
2016	Radio Disney Music Awards	Best New Artist	DNCE	Nominated
2016	Radio Disney Music Awards	Best Song to Lip Sync	"Cake by the Ocean"	Nominated
2016	MTV Europe Music Awards	Best New Act	DNCE	Nominated
2016	MTV Europe Music Awards	Best Push Act	DNCE	Won
2016	MTV Video Music Awards	Best New Artist	DNCE	Won
2016	MTV Video Music Awards Japan	International New Artist	DNCE	Won
2016	Teen Choice Awards	Choice Music: Breakout Artist	DNCE	Nominated
2016	Teen Choice Awards	Choice Music: Group	DNCE	Nominated
2016	Teen Choice Awards	Choice Music: Party Song	"Cake by the Ocean"	Won
2016	Teen Choice Awards	Choice Music Single: Group	"Cake by the Ocean"	Nominated
2016	Teen Choice Awards	Choice Summer Music Star: Group	DNCE	Nominated
2017	iHeartRadio Music Awards	Best Cover Song	"Hands to Myself"	Nominated
2017	iHeartRadio Music Awards	Best Duo/Group of the Year	DNCE	Nominated
2017	People's Choice Awards	Favorite Breakout Artist	DNCE	Nominated
2017	Radio Disney Music Awards	Song of the Year	"Cake by the Ocean"	Nominated
2017	Radio Disney Music Awards	Best Song to Lip Sync To	"Cake by the Ocean"	Nominated
2017	Radio Disney Music Awards	Breakout Artist of the Year	DNCE	Nominated
