= Beatbullyz =

British musical group

- Years active: 2005 - 2012
- Past members: Daniel Dubose, Andrew Bullimore, Stuart Anderson, Phil Murphey, Alex Yeoman

Beatbullyz was a musical group from the Swindon area of England. The group was influenced by hip hop, ska, funk, soul, and big beat. The band was fronted by Daniel Dubose (Bozo) and Andrew Bullimore (Bully), both of whom created the music. The group was on the roster of Big Weekend Records, Bullimore's record label. The Beatbullyz street team was known as "The Minotaurs".

A review in the British newspaper, The Guardian, stated that the group held the potential to be "the UK answer to Black Eyed Peas." Endorsements for the Beatbullyz were also given by BBC Radio 1 DJs Scott Mills, Fearne Cotton, Huw Stephens and Greg James.

== Past members ==
- Daniel Dubose AKA Bozo (lyricist)
- Andrew Bullimore AKA Bully (producer and singer)
- Stuart Anderson AKA Disco (drummer)
- Phil Murphey AKA Philonius Funk (Scratch DJ)
- Alex Yeoman AKA YoYo (Bassist)

== Formation ==
Beatbullyz formed after the end of Bullimore's previous musical projects, Nebulae (live drum and bass) and Bully Live (solo drum and bass). A former Salisbury College sound engineering student, Bullimore began singing on his own tracks and joined with old friend Dubose, whom he had known for many years, to embark on songwriting together. Bullimore and Dubose had previously trained together in martial arts. During this period, Stuart Anderson (who had previously been the drummer with Nebulae) joined the group and Phil Murphey (DJ) would later complete the original line-up.

== Career ==
Since their formation, the Beatbullyz have had a busy career performing at local venues in Swindon. In 2008, they came 1st in Channel 4's unsigned band competition, which won them a chance to star in the soap opera Hollyoaks. In the same year, they released their album Rootz. In 2009, they got their break in the form of Radio 1's Big Weekend in Swindon, where they appeared on the "BBC Introducing" stage, introduced by Radio 1 DJ Huw Stephens. He invited them back for the Maida Vale Session in July. In August that year, they performed at the Moonfest as well as supporting Example in the later part of 2009.

In February 2010, they shared a stage with Scouting for Girls and backed N Dubz on their tour throughout March into April. Dappy from N Dubz said "Beatbullyz are too unique, I love them, no-one sounds like them, Beatbullyz all the way man." They played their own gigs throughout April, including a performance at the Playaway Festival. The next month they were back at Radio 1's Big Weekend in Wales where Fearne Cotten introduced them, pledging her support when they headlined the BBC Introducing stage. They released their debut single Skillz that May.

In 2010 they shared a stage with Eliza Doolittle and performed at the Wireless Festival in July. They unveiled their second release, Bounce and then their third release Human Nature and the last release single Heartbeat Ft Lizzy Paterson.Beatbullyz played at the Big Arts Day in Swindon at Lydiard Park. They carried on touring, sharing the stage with such acts as Professor Green and Tinchy Stryder at Spa Bidlington. They recorded a track with, Lizzie Patterson, sister of Robert Patterson, in 2010. In August, they supported Jason Derulo on his UK tour as well as doing their own tour ending in February 2011. In September 2010, Beatbullyz released their album Human Nature and throughout December supported JLS on their tour across the UK in 2010. They supported Example in their hometown Swindon at the MECA. Bozo is featured on a track with another local from Swindon, Daine Gooden. In May 2011 they supported Coolio.

In 2011, Beatbullyz released a non-album single called Shout and an official music video on 31 July 2011. After Beatbullyz released the single, they split up and went onto solo projects. https://www.swindonadvertiser.co.uk/news/9516934.beatbullyz-split/

Beatbullyz never managed to chart in the UK Top 40.

== Disbanding ==
On 6 February 2012, the group announced the end of Beatbullyz on its Facebook fan page and promoted a final live performance at Swindon's MECA venue.

== Awards ==
- 2003 Diesel:U:Music award (dance category)

== Discography ==
=== Albums ===
Human Nature

- Released 19 September 2010
1. "Golden City"
2. "Bounce"
3. "How The Story Goes"
4. "Pieces"
5. "Human Nature"
6. "Skills"
7. "Starlight"
8. "Keyz To Life"
9. "Heartbeat"

=== Singles ===
- "Skills" (May 2010)
- "Bounce" (July 2010)
- "Human Nature" (August 2010)
- "Heartbeat Ft Lizzy Paterson" (August 2010)
- "Shout" (31 July 2011)

=== Music Videos ===
- "Skills" (May 2010)
- "Bounce" (July 2010)
- "Human Nature" (August 2010)
- "Heartbeat Ft Lizzy Paterson" (August 2010)
- "Shout" (31 July 2011)
