= Cake by the Ocean =

2015 debut single by DNCE

Single by DNCE

from the EP Swaay
- Released: September 18, 2015
- Recorded: 2015
- Genre: Pop; dance; disco-pop; funk
- Length: 3:39
- Label: Republic
- Songwriters: Joseph Jonas; Justin Tranter; Mattias Larsson; Robin Fredriksson
- Producer: Mattman & Robin

DNCE singles chronology
"Cake by the Ocean" (2015)	"Rock Bottom" (2016)

Alternative cover
- Live version cover

Music video
- "Cake by the Ocean" on YouTube

"Cake by the Ocean" is the debut single by American band DNCE. It was released through Republic Records as the lead single from their debut extended play, Swaay, on September 18, 2015, with the song being released on the EP a month later on October 23. It was also included on their self-titled debut studio album, which was released on November 18, 2016. The song was produced by Mattman & Robin and was written by the duo alongside group member Joe Jonas and Justin Tranter, the latter of whom previously being a member of Semi Precious Weapons with another member of DNCE, Cole Whittle.

"Cake by the Ocean" is a 1970s inspired pop, dance, and disco-pop song. Lyrically, the song is about sexual intercourse. The song became a huge success, charting at number nine on the Billboard Hot 100. It has also charted in multiple countries, including Australia, Canada, Ireland, Italy, Japan (where it hit the top of the charts), New Zealand, Sweden, and the United Kingdom. The song was also certified platinum in seven countries and was certified Gold in Denmark. "Cake by the Ocean" was received positively by music critics, and it has appeared in several forms of media, including films, shows, video games, commercials, and trailers.

== Composition ==
"Cake by the Ocean" was co-written by Joe Jonas, Justin Tranter, and Swedish duo Mattman & Robin, who also produced the song. Lyrically, the song is about sexual intercourse, but is also often interpreted to be referring to the cocktail Sex on the Beach. The song's title originated from Mattman & Robin's repeatedly confusing the phrase "sex on the beach" for "cake by the ocean". The original version includes the phrases, "go fucking crazy" and "God damn", which necessitated the production of "clean" versions with altered wording to ensure broadcasting obscenity requirements were met.

"Cake by the Ocean" is composed in the key of E minor and has a tempo of 119 beats per minute, with DNCE's vocals ranging from E_{3} to D_{5}. It is a 1970s-inspired pop, dance, and disco-pop song.

== Release ==
"Cake by the Ocean" was released through Republic Records as the lead single from their debut extended play, Swaay, on September 18, 2015. It earned a second release in 2016, after being included on their self-titled debut studio album.

To promote the single, DNCE have performed the song numerous times live. They did so as musical guests on The Ellen DeGeneres Show and The Graham Norton Show. They performed a 1950s rock-inspired version of "Cake by the Ocean" for their cameo in Grease: Live as Johnny Casino and the Gamblers. The band performed the song live at the 2016 Radio Disney Music Awards, the 2016 Kids' Choice Awards, and the 2016 Billboard Music Awards in the US, and the 2016 Royal Variety Performance in the UK. The Jonas Brothers, Joe's group at the time, performed the song as part of the medley of hits along with Nick's debut hit "Jealous" and the recently released "Sucker" at the 2019 Billboard Music Awards. DNCE joined the Jonas Brothers in performing the song during the Global Citizen Festival 2022. Jonas Brothers also performed the song at Capital's Summertime Ball at Wembley Stadium on June 11, 2023.

== Music video ==
The video, directed by Black Coffee and Jonas' then-girlfriend Gigi Hadid, was released on October 16, 2015. It depicts DNCE performing "in front of a giant piece of cake on the beach" when a cake-throwing battle ensues between The Fat Jewish (Josh Ostrovsky) and "a bunch of bikini clad women who are 'Team DNCE'". Both vie "to become the 'cake fight champion', but as it turns out, everyone is a winner, as the scene becomes one giant beach party". It features product placement scenes by the dating app Bumble, including a shot of a hand swiping through photos of women and a Bumble-branded towel being waved.

== Critical reception and accolades ==
"Cake by the Ocean" earned positive reviews from music critics. At the Radio Disney Music Awards, the song received nominations for Song of the Year and Best Anthem, and two nominations for Best Song to Lip Sync. At the Teen Choice Awards, it won Choice Music: Party Song. Billboard included "Cake by the Ocean" on their "100 Best Pop Songs of 2016" list.

A critic for Billboard wrote "Joe Jonas' group took a song about basically nothing, put a blistering pop-funk beat behind it, added some major scream-along hooks, and emerged with a top 10 smash to rival anything little bro [Jonas] has produced on his own." Issy Sampson of The Guardian called the song a "frothy pop dream" and praised the "easy-to-chant chorus, only with the added thrill of hearing a former Disney star swear and make references to 'eating cake by the ocean'."

== Commercial performance ==
"Cake by the Ocean" debuted at number 79 on the US Billboard Hot 100 issued for November 7, 2015. On March 5, 2016, the song moved from number 11 to number 10 and became Jonas' fourth career top-10 entry, making him the sixth artist to reach the top 10 as a soloist and with two groups. It peaked at number nine in its 19th week on the chart and spent 46 weeks in total. The Recording Industry Association of America (RIAA) certified the single 5× Platinum, which denotes five million units based on sales and track-equivalent on-demand streams. On the Canadian Hot 100, "Cake by the Ocean" peaked at number seven and was certified 9× Platinum by Music Canada.

The song reached number four in the United Kingdom and the British Phonographic Industry (BPI) certified it 3× Platinum. In Italy, it peaked at number 11 and was certified 4× Platinum. "Cake by the Ocean" reached number six in Australia and was certified 7× Platinum. In New Zealand, the song peaked at number 10 and was certified 5× Platinum. "Cake by the Ocean" charted within the top five of national record charts, at number one in Argentina, Ecuador, Israel, number two in Slovenia, number five in Austria, the Czech Republic, Serbia. It received a 2× Platinum certification Poland, Spain, and Platinum in France, Germany, the Netherlands, Sweden.

== Usage in media ==
The song is featured in the films Pitch Perfect 3, Bad Moms, Middle School: The Worst Years of My Life, Malibu Rescue, The King of Staten Island, Sing 2, and in trailers for Mike and Dave Need Wedding Dates, Hotel Transylvania 3: Summer Vacation and The Lost City. It has also been featured in the television shows Every Year After, Telenovela, South Park, No Tomorrow, The Real O'Neals, The Challenge XXX: Dirty 30, Mary + Jane, The Wilds, My Life with the Walter Boys, and Percy Jackson and the Olympians. Furthermore, the song appeared in an Indonesian Mizone commercial in August 2016, and the clean version of the song is a playable track in Just Dance 2017. It was also featured in the Brazilian teen soap-opera Malhação during its 24th season.

== Lyrical changes ==
On September 28, 2024, at a Jonas Brothers concert at the LDLC Arena in Décines-Charpieu, in the Metropolis of Lyon, Joe Jonas changed the lyric "Walk for me, baby / I'll be Diddy, you'll be Naomi" to "Walk for me, baby / I’ll be watching you be Naomi". The changes came as the rapper, born Sean Combs, was arrested and charged with racketeering and sex trafficking by force.

== Personnel ==
- Mixer: Serban Ghenea
- Assistant mixer: John Hanes
- Bass, programming, guitar, percussion, background vocalist, producer, Lyricist, composer, drums: Mattias Larsson
- Background vocalist, programming, producer, lyricist, composer, percussion, bass, drums, guitar: Robin Frederiksson
- Background vocalist, lyricist, composer: Justin Tranter
- Lyricist, composer, lead vocalist: Joe Jonas

== Charts ==
=== Weekly charts ===
Weekly chart positions for "Cake by the Ocean"
Chart (2015–2016)	Peak position
Argentina (Monitor Latino)	1
Australia (ARIA)	6
Austria (Ö3 Austria Top 40)	5
Belgium (Ultratop 50 Flanders)	13
Belgium (Ultratop 50 Wallonia)	16
Canada Hot 100 (Billboard)	7
Canada AC (Billboard)	2
Canada CHR/Top 40 (Billboard)	4
Canada Hot AC (Billboard)	2
CIS Airplay (TopHit)	6
Czech Republic Airplay (ČNS IFPI)	5
Czech Republic Singles Digital (ČNS IFPI)	17
Denmark (Tracklisten)	18
Ecuador (National-Report)	1
France (SNEP)	23
Germany (GfK)	6
Germany Airplay (BVMI)	1
Hungary (Dance Top 40)	9
Hungary (Rádiós Top 40)	3
Hungary (Single Top 40)	11
Hungary (Stream Top 40)	12
Ireland (IRMA)	6
Israel International Airplay (Media Forest)	1
Italy (FIMI)	11
Japan Hot Overseas (Billboard)	1
Lebanon (Lebanese Top 20)	19
Mexico (Billboard Ingles Airplay)	1
Mexico Anglo (Monitor Latino)	3
Netherlands (Dutch Top 40)	10
Netherlands (Single Top 100)	19
New Zealand (Recorded Music NZ)	10
Norway (VG-lista)	33
Poland Airplay (ZPAV)	1
Portugal (AFP)	15
Russia Airplay (TopHit)	4
Serbia (Radiomonitor)	5
Slovakia Airplay (ČNS IFPI)	41
Slovakia Singles Digital (ČNS IFPI)	18
Slovenia (SloTop50)	2
Spain (Promusicae)	16
Sweden (Sverigetopplistan)	24
Switzerland (Schweizer Hitparade)	13
UK Singles (Official Charts)	4
Ukraine Airplay (TopHit)	6
US Billboard Hot 100	9
US Adult Contemporary (Billboard)	6
US Adult Pop Airplay (Billboard)	1
US Dance Airplay (Billboard)	8
US Dance Club Songs (Billboard)	33
US Pop Airplay (Billboard)	2
Venezuela English (Record Report)	1

=== Year-end charts ===
2016 year-end chart positions for "Cake by the Ocean"
Chart (2016)	Position
Argentina (Monitor Latino)	5
Australia (ARIA)	35
Austria (Ö3 Austria Top 40)	40
Belgium (Ultratop Flanders)	32
Belgium (Ultratop Wallonia)	48
Brazil (Brasil Hot 100)	52
Canada (Canadian Hot 100)	15
Canada Radio Songs (Nielsen)	2
CIS (Tophit)	18
Denmark (Tracklisten)	54
France (SNEP)	70
Germany (Official German Charts)	36
Hungary (Dance Top 40)	28
Hungary (Rádiós Top 40)	1
Hungary (Single Top 40)	28
Iceland (Plötutíóindi)	14
Israel (Media Forest)	1
Italy (FIMI)	26
Netherlands (Dutch Top 40)	42
Netherlands (Single Top 100)	38
New Zealand (Recorded Music NZ)	30
Poland (ZPAV)	28
Russia Airplay (Tophit)	18
Slovenia (SloTop50)	19
Spain (PROMUSICAE)	37
Sweden (Sverigetopplistan)	50
Switzerland (Schweizer Hitparade)	35
Ukraine Airplay (Tophit)	43
UK Singles (Official Charts Company)	23
US Billboard Hot 100	18
US Adult Contemporary (Billboard)	11
US Adult Top 40 (Billboard)	6
US Dance/Mix Show Songs (Billboard)	34
US Mainstream Top 40 (Billboard)	13

2017 year-end chart positions for "Cake by the Ocean"
Chart (2017)	Position
Argentina (Monitor Latino)	41
Hungary (Dance Top 40)	46
Israel (Media Forest)	43
US Adult Contemporary (Billboard)	18

2025 year-end chart positions for "Cake by the Ocean"
Chart (2025)	Position
Hungary (Rádiós Top 40)	97

== Certifications ==
Certifications for "Cake by the Ocean"
Region	Certification	Certified units/sales
Australia (ARIA)	7× Platinum	490,000^{‡}
Belgium (BRMA)	Platinum	20,000^{‡}
Brazil (Pro-Música Brasil)	Diamond	250,000^{‡}
Canada (Music Canada)	9× Platinum	720,000^{‡}
Denmark (IFPI Danmark)	2× Platinum	180,000^{‡}
France (SNEP)	Platinum	133,333^{‡}
Germany (BVMI)	Platinum	400,000^{‡}
Italy (FIMI)	4× Platinum	200,000^{‡}
Netherlands (NVPI)	Platinum	30,000^{‡}
New Zealand (RMNZ)	6× Platinum	180,000^{‡}
Poland (ZPAV)	2× Platinum	40,000^{‡}
Portugal (AFP)	Platinum	20,000^{‡}
Spain (Promusicae)	2× Platinum	80,000^{‡}
Sweden (GLF)	3× Platinum	120,000^{‡}
United Kingdom (BPI)	3× Platinum	1,800,000^{‡}
United States (RIAA)	5× Platinum	5,000,000^{‡} / 1,684,000
^{‡} Sales+streaming figures based on certification alone.

== Release history ==
Release dates and format(s) for "Cake by the Ocean"
Region	Date	Format	Label	Ref.
United States	September 18, 2015	Digital download	Republic	
United States	September 18, 2015	Streaming	Republic	
United States	September 29, 2015	Contemporary hit radio	Republic	
