= Jack Lawless =

American drummer (born 1987)

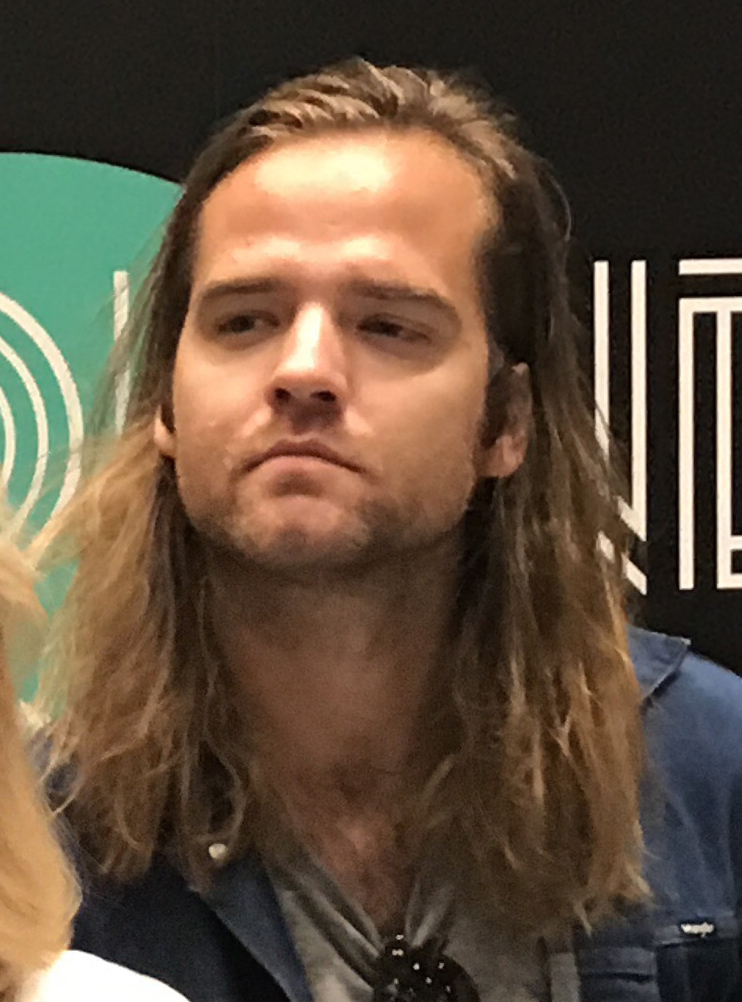
- Lawless with DNCE in 2017

Background information
- Born: September 20, 1987 (age 38); New Jersey, U.S.
- Genres: Pop rock; power pop; dance-rock
- Occupation: Drummer
- Years active: 2007–present
- Member of: Ocean Grove; Bort
- Formerly of: DNCE

Jack Lawless (born September 20, 1987) is an American musician. He was the drummer for the band DNCE before their second hiatus in 2024 and currently drummer for band Ocean Grove. He is the live drummer for the pop rock group Jonas Brothers. He grew up in Middletown Township, New Jersey, part of Monmouth County.

== Career ==
Lawless has performed with the Jonas Brothers since 2006.

In 2008, Lawless played the drums on Demi Lovato's debut album Don't Forget.

He was formerly the drummer for the band DNCE (with Joe Jonas as lead singer and Jinjoo Lee as guitarist) which debuted in 2015.

The Jonas Brothers' backing band included Ryan Liestman on keyboards, John Taylor on guitar, Greg Garbowsky on bass, and Lawless on drums.
