= JinJoo Lee =

South Korean-American guitarist (born 1987)

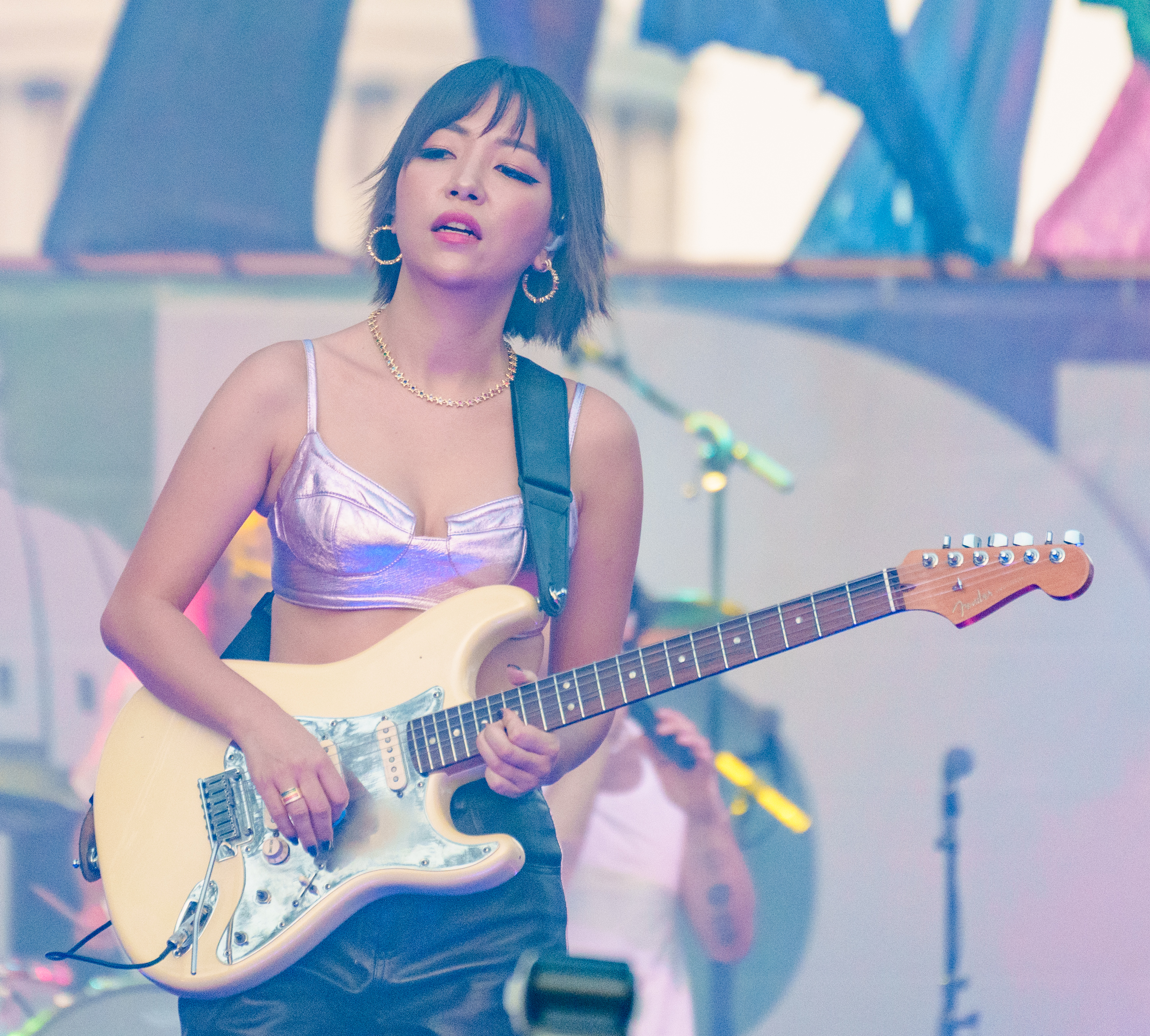
- Lee performing with DNCE in 2022

Background information
- Born: November 15, 1987 (age 38); Incheon, South Korea
- Genres: Pop rock; rock
- Occupation: Guitarist
- Years active: 2009–present
- Formerly of: DNCE

Korean name
- Hangul: 이진주
- RR: I Jinju
- MR: I Chinju

JinJoo Lee (Korean: 이진주; born November 15, 1987) is a Korean-American musician, best known as the guitarist for the pop rock band DNCE.

== Early life ==
JinJoo Lee was born in Incheon, South Korea on November 15, 1987. Lee taught herself to play guitar at the age of 12, to join her family's band as the guitarist. She moved to Los Angeles at 19, where she learned English and attended the Musicians Institute in Hollywood. She is the sister-in-law of gospel singer Sohyang.

== Career ==
Lee has performed with JoJo, the Jonas Brothers, Charli XCX, Jordin Sparks, and CeeLo Green's all-female backing band, Scarlet Fever, from 2010 to 2011. She is the guitarist for the band DNCE, which debuted in 2015.

=== DNCE ===
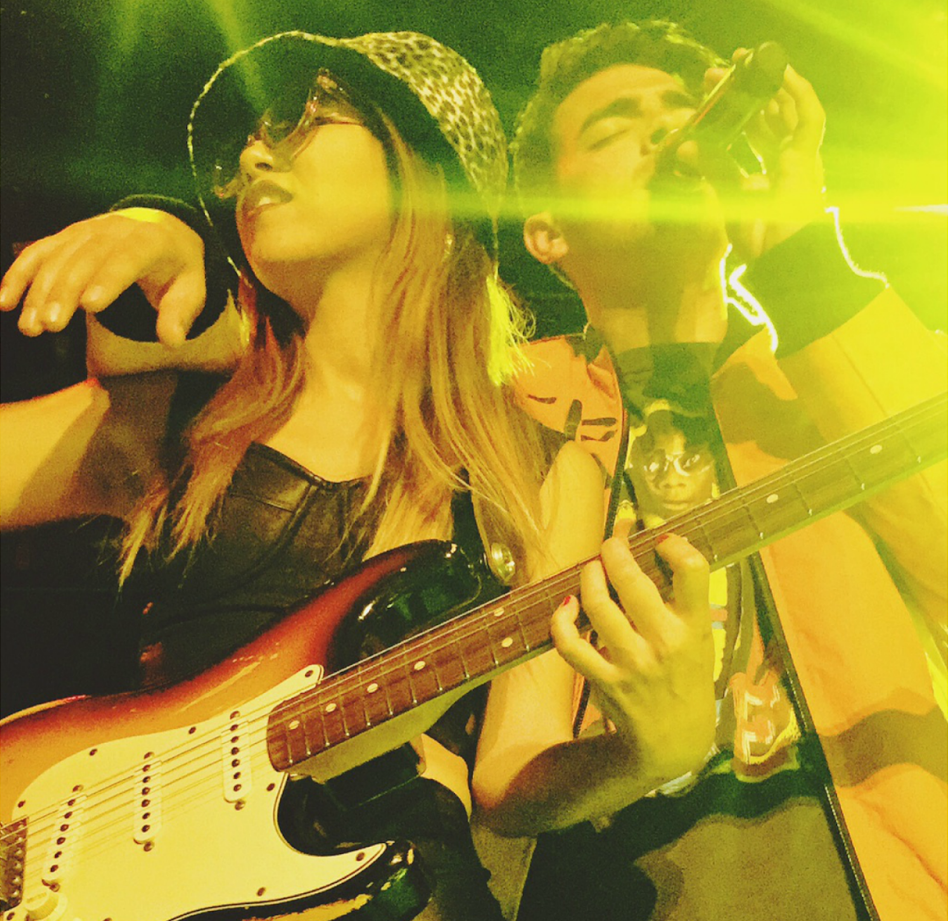
Lee and Jonas in 2015

Lee met Joe Jonas in 2009, when touring with the Jonas Brothers. She was the only woman in the band, and when asked about it said, "It's the best thing ever...because they are very simple. Guys are so simple and easy. I don't know, I love working with guys. It's always been like that for my career. I was the only female in the band the entire time, so I'm very used to it. I'm very comfortable, and they're funny and silly."
