= Julia Michaels discography =

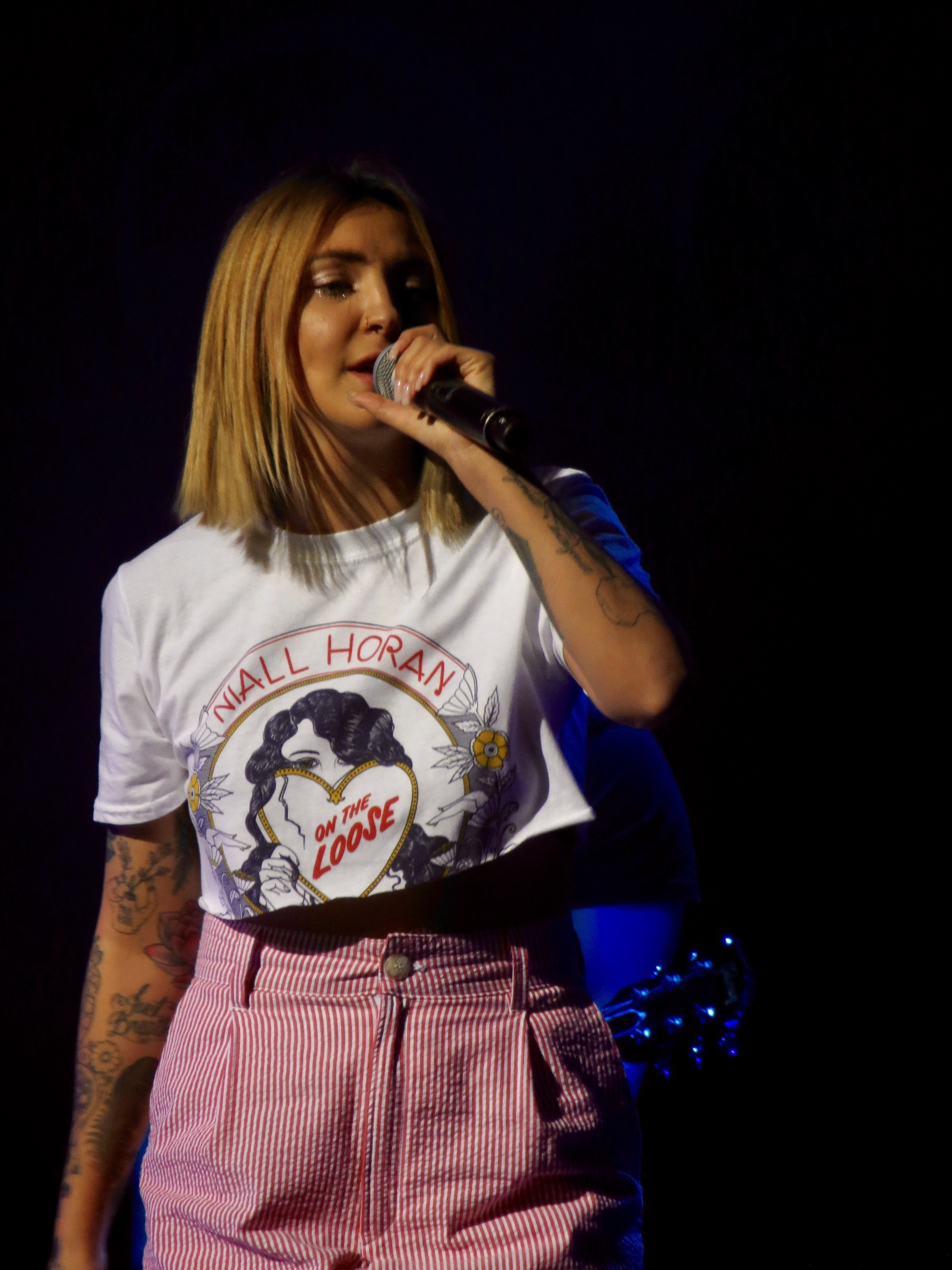
- Michaels performing in 2018
- Studio albums: 1
- EPs: 6
- Singles: 33
- Music videos: 26
- Promotional singles: 11

American singer Julia Michaels has released one studio album, six extended plays (EP), thirty-two singles (including nine as a featured artist) and eleven promotional singles. She released her self-titled debut EP in 2010 and a second, Futuristic, two years later. Michaels signed with Republic Records in 2016 and released her debut single, "Issues", on January 13, 2017. The song peaked at number 11 on the US Billboard Hot 100 and reached the top 10 in various countries, including Australia, Belgium, Denmark, Norway, and the UK. It preceded her third EP, Nervous System (2017), which charted in the top 50 in the US, Canada, and Sweden. The EP was further supported by the singles "Uh Huh" and "Worst in Me". Michaels was featured on Clean Bandit's single "I Miss You" (2017), which reached the top 10 in Belgium, Ireland, the Netherlands, and the UK.

In 2018, Michaels did several features and contributed the song "Heaven" to the Fifty Shades Freed soundtrack. It peaked at number four in Norway and was certified Platinum there, in Canada, and in the US. She released two EPs in 2019. Inner Monologue Part 1 charted in the top 50 in Australia, Canada, and Sweden and produced the singles "Anxiety", featuring Selena Gomez, and "What a Time", featuring Niall Horan. The former entered the charts in Australia, Canada, and Ireland, and the latter went Platinum in Canada and the US. Later that year, Michaels featured on JP Saxe's single "If the World Was Ending", which reached number 27 on the Billboard Hot 100 and the top 30 in several other countries. It received a 3× Platinum certification in Australia, 2× Platinum in Canada, and Platinum in many other countries. Her debut studio album, Not in Chronological Order (2021), peaked at number 183 in the US, number 91 in Australia, and number 97 in Canada.

== Albums ==
=== Studio albums ===
List of studio albums, showing selected chart positions
Title	Album details	Peak chart positions		
Title	Album details	US	AUS	CAN
Not in Chronological Order	Released: April 30, 2021; Label: Republic; Formats: CD, LP, digital download, streaming	183	91	97

== Extended plays ==
List of extended plays, showing selected chart positions and certifications
Title	Details	Peak chart positions						Certifications
Title	Details	US	AUS	CAN	NOR	NZ Heat.	SWE	Certifications
Julia Michaels	Released: July 20, 2010; Label: SA Trackworks; Format: Digital download, streaming	—	—	—	—	—	—	
Futuristic	Released: April 18, 2012; Label: Mighty Generation; Format: Digital download, streaming	—	—	—	—	—	—	
Nervous System	Released: July 28, 2017; Label: Republic; Format: Digital download, streaming, CD	48	97	41	—	1	24	MC: Gold
Inner Monologue Part 1	Released: January 24, 2019; Label: Republic; Formats: Digital download, streaming	99	43	45	—	—	39	
Inner Monologue Part 2	Released: June 28, 2019; Label: Republic; Formats: Digital download, streaming	—	91	—	14	—	—	
Second Self	Released: May 23, 2025; Label: GFY Records; Formats: Digital download, streaming	—	—	—	—	—	—	
"—" denotes a recording that did not chart or was not released in that territory.

== Singles ==
=== As lead artist ===
List of singles as lead artist, showing year released, with selected chart positions, certifications and album name
Title	Year	Peak chart positions										Certifications	Album
Title	Year	US	AUS	BEL (FL)	CAN	DEN	IRE	NOR	NZ	SWE	UK	Certifications	Album
"Issues"	2017	11	5	8	17	3	11	3	11	11	10	RIAA: 5× Platinum; MC: 6× Platinum; BPI: 2× Platinum; ARIA: 3× Platinum; RMNZ: 4× Platinum; BEA: Platinum; FIMI: 2× Platinum; GLF: 4× Platinum; IFPI DEN: 3× Platinum; IFPI NOR: 3× Platinum	Nervous System
"Uh Huh"	2017	—	88	—	—	—	—	—	— (Note: "Uh Huh" did not enter the NZ Top 40 Singles Chart, but peaked at number 5 on the NZ Heatseekers Chart.)	—	—	MC: Gold	Nervous System
"Worst in Me"	2017	—	—	—	—	—	—	—	— (Note: "Worst in Me" did not enter the NZ Top 40 Singles Chart, but peaked at number 8 on the NZ Heatseekers Chart.)	—	—	MC: Gold	Nervous System
"Hurt Somebody" (with Noah Kahan)	2018	—	14	— (Note: "Hurt Somebody" did not enter the Ultratop 50, but peaked at number eight on the Ultratip chart.)	—	—	—	—	29	88	—	RIAA: Gold; MC: 2× Platinum; BPI: Gold; ARIA: 5× Platinum; RMNZ: 3× Platinum; GLF: Gold; IFPI DEN: Gold; IFPI NOR: Gold	Hurt Somebody and Busyhead
"Heaven"	2018	— (Note: "Heaven" did not enter the Billboard Hot 100, but peaked at number eight on the Bubbling Under Hot 100 Singles chart.)	—	— (Note: "Heaven" did not enter the Ultratop 50, but peaked at number seven on the Ultratip chart.)	65	24	48	4	— (Note: "Heaven" did not enter the NZ Top 40 Singles Chart, but peaked at number six on the NZ Heatseeker Singles Chart.)	23	77	RIAA: Platinum; MC: Platinum; BPI: Gold; RMNZ: Platinum; IFPI DEN: Platinum; IFPI NOR: Platinum	Fifty Shades Freed
"Jump" (featuring Trippie Redd)	2018	—	—	—	—	—	—	—	— (Note: "Jump" did not enter the NZ Top 40 Singles Chart, but peaked at number seven on the NZ Heatseeker Singles Chart.)	— (Note: "Jump" did not enter the Swedish Singellista Chart, but peaked at number 17 on the Swedish Heatseeker Chart.)	—	MC: Gold; ARIA: Gold	Non-album single
"Anxiety" (featuring Selena Gomez)	2019	— (Note: "Anxiety" did not enter the US Billboard Hot 100, but peaked at number 28 on the Digital Song Sales chart.)	67	—	69	—	79	—	— (Note: "Anxiety did not enter the NZ Top 40 Singles Chart, but peaked at number 8 on the NZ Hot Singles Chart.)	— (Note: "Anxiety" did not enter the Swedish Singellista Chart, but peaked at number 10 on the Swedish Heatseeker Chart.)	— (Note: "Anxiety" did not enter the UK Singles Chart, but peaked at number 19 on the UK Video Streaming Chart.)	MC: Gold	Inner Monologue Part 1
"What a Time" (featuring Niall Horan)	2019	—	100	—	95	—	26	—	— (Note: "What a Time" did not enter the NZ Top 40 Singles Chart, but peaked at number 23 on the NZ Hot Singles Chart.)	—	71	RIAA: 2× Platinum; MC: Platinum; BPI: Platinum; RMNZ: 2× Platinum; IFPI DEN: Platinum	Inner Monologue Part 1
"Okay" (with LANY)	2019	—	—	—	—	—	—	—	— (Note: "Okay" did not enter the NZ Top 40 Singles Chart, but peaked at number 16 on the NZ Hot Singles Chart.)	—	—		Non-album single
"Hurt Again"	2019	—	—	—	—	—	—	—	— (Note: "Hurt Again" did not enter the NZ Top 40 Singles Chart, but peaked at number 16 on the NZ Hot Singles Chart.)	—	—		Inner Monologue Part 2
"If You Need Me"	2019	—	—	—	—	—	—	—	— (Note: "If You Need Me" did not enter the NZ Top 40 Singles Chart, but peaked at number 19 on the NZ Hot Singles Chart.)	—	—		Non-album single
"Heartless" (with Diplo featuring Morgan Wallen)	2020	—	—	—	—	—	—	—	— (Note: "Heartless" did not enter the NZ Top 40 Singles Chart, but peaked at number 19 on the NZ Hot Singles Chart.)	—	—		Diplo Presents Thomas Wesley, Chapter 1: Snake Oil
"Lie Like This"	2020	—	—	—	—	—	—	—	—	—	—		Not in Chronological Order
"Kissin' in the Cold" (with JP Saxe)	2020	—	—	—	—	—	—	—	— (Note: "Kissin' in the Cold" did not enter the NZ Top 40 Singles Chart, but peaked at number 32 on the NZ Hot Singles Chart.)	—	—		Non-album single
"All Your Exes"	2021	—	—	—	—	—	—	—	— (Note: "All Your Exes" did not enter the NZ Top 40 Singles Chart, but peaked at number 27 on the NZ Hot Singles Chart.)	—	—		Not in Chronological Order
"Love Is Weird"	2021	—	—	—	—	—	—	—	— (Note: "Love Is Weird" did not enter the NZ Top 40 Singles Chart, but peaked at number 33 on the NZ Hot Singles Chart.)	—	—		Not in Chronological Order
"Fingers Crossed" (with Trevor Daniel)	2021	—	—	—	—	—	—	—	— (Note: "Fingers Crossed" did not enter the NZ Top 40 Singles Chart, but peaked at number 35 on the NZ Hot Singles Chart.)	—	—		That Was Then
"Only One" (with Khea and Becky G featuring Di Genius)	2021	—	—	—	—	—	—	—	—	—	—		Non-album singles
"Sorry to Me Too"	2022	—	—	—	—	—	—	—	— (Note: "Sorry to Me Too" did not enter the NZ Top 40 Singles Chart, but peaked at number 30 on the NZ Hot Singles Chart.)	—	—		Non-album singles
"In a Perfect World" (with Dean Lewis)	2023	—	—	—	—	—	—	—	— (Note: "In a Perfect World" did not enter the NZ Top 40 Singles Chart, but peaked at number 10 on the NZ Hot Singles Chart.)	— (Note: "In a Perfect World" did not enter the Swedish Singellista Chart, but peaked at number five on the Swedish Heatseeker Chart.)	—		Non-album singles
"Thick of It All" (with Alan Walker and Joe Jonas)	2024	—	—	—	—	—	—	—	—	—	—		Walkerworld 2.0
"Heaven II"	2024	—	—	—	—	—	—	—	—	—	—		Second Self
"Scissors" (with Maren Morris)	2025	—	—	—	—	—	—	—	— (Note: "Scissors" did not enter the NZ Top 40 Singles Chart, but peaked at number 39 on the NZ Hot Singles Chart.)	—	—		Second Self
"GFY"	2025	—	—	—	—	—	—	—	—	—	—		Second Self
"Try Your Luck"	2025	—	—	—	—	—	—	—	—	—	—		Second Self
"No Heartbreak's Killed Me Yet"	2025	—	—	—	—	—	—	—	—	—	—		Non-album single
"Kingmaker" (with Maisie Peters)	2026	—	—	—	—	—	—	—	—	—	—		Florescence
"—" denotes a recording that did not chart or was not released in that territory.

=== As featured artist ===
List of singles as featured artist, showing year released, with selected chart positions, certifications and album name
Title	Year	Peak chart positions										Certifications	Album
Title	Year	US	AUS	BEL (FL)	CAN	DEN	IRE	NOR	NLD	NZ	UK	Certifications	Album
"Carry Me" (Kygo featuring Julia Michaels)	2016	—	77	— (Note: "Carry Me" did not enter the Ultratop 50, but peaked at number 40 on the Ultratip chart.)	—	—	—	39	81	—	133	MC: Gold	Cloud Nine
"Friends" (Remix) (Justin Bieber and BloodPop featuring Julia Michaels)	2017	—	—	—	—	—	—	—	—	—	—		Non-album single
"I Miss You" (Clean Bandit featuring Julia Michaels)	2017	92	20	5	50	14	3	18	10	17	4	RIAA: Gold; MC: 2× Platinum; BPI: 2× Platinum; ARIA: 3× Platinum; BEA: Platinum; FIMI: Platinum; IFPI DEN: Platinum; RMNZ: 3× Platinum	What Is Love?
"Coming Home" (Keith Urban featuring Julia Michaels)	2018	50	84	—	84	—	—	—	—	—	—	RIAA: Gold; ARIA: Gold	Graffiti U
"Light Me Up" (RL Grime featuring Miguel and Julia Michaels)	2018	—	—	—	—	—	—	—	—	—	—		Nova
"There's No Way" (Lauv featuring Julia Michaels)	2018	—	37	— (Note: "There's No Way" did not enter the Ultratop 50, but peaked at number 26 on the Ultratip chart.)	—	—	55	—	—	— (Note: "There's No Way" did not enter the NZ Top 40 Singles Chart, but peaked at number 10 on the NZ Hot Singles Chart.)	—	RIAA: Gold; ARIA: Platinum; RMNZ: Platinum; IFPI DEN: Gold	Non-album single
"Lie to Me" (5 Seconds of Summer featuring Julia Michaels)	2018	—	38	—	—	—	42	—	—	— (Note: "Lie to Me" did not enter the NZ Top 40 Singles Chart, but peaked at number 9 on the NZ Hot Singles Chart.)	—	MC: Gold; BPI: Silver; RMNZ: Platinum	Youngblood
"Peer Pressure" (James Bay featuring Julia Michaels)	2019	—	68	— (Note: "Peer Pressure" did not enter the Ultratop 50, but peaked at number 42 on the Ultratip chart.)	—	—	62	—	—	— (Note: "Peer Pressure" did not enter the NZ Top 40 Singles Chart, but peaked at number four on the NZ Hot Singles Chart.)	85	RIAA: Gold; BPI: Silver; MC: Gold; RMNZ: Platinum	Oh My Messy Mind
"If the World Was Ending" (JP Saxe featuring Julia Michaels)	2019	27	29	13	13	39	17	15	25	20	14	RIAA: 4× Platinum; ARIA: 3× Platinum; BEA: Platinum; BPI: 2× Platinum; IFPI DEN: Platinum; MC: 8× Platinum; RMNZ: 3× Platinum	Hold It Together and Dangerous Levels of Introspection
"Cut!" (Maren Morris featuring Julia Michaels)	2024	—	—	—	—	—	—	—	—	— (Note: "Cut!" did not enter the NZ Top 40 Singles Chart, but peaked at number 15 on the NZ Hot Singles Chart.)	—		Intermission and Dreamsicle
"Want This Beer" (with Josh Ross)	2024	—	—	—	—	—	—	—	—	—	—		Non-album singles
"Air" (Gryffin and Excision featuring Julia Michaels)	2025	—	—	—	—	—	—	—	—	—	—		Non-album singles
"Raft in the Sea" (Danny L Harle featuring Julia Michaels)	2026	—	—	—	—	—	—	—	—	—	—		Non-album singles
"—" denotes a recording that did not chart or was not released in that territory.

=== Promotional singles ===
List of promotional singles, showing year released, with selected chart positions, certifications and album name
Title	Year	Peak chart positions						Certifications	Album
Title	Year	US Bub.	AUS	CAN	IRE	NZ Heat.	SWE Heat.	Certifications	Album
"Help Me Out" (with Maroon 5)	2017	18	83	80	86	3	8		Red Pill Blues
"In This Place"	2018	—	—	—	—	—	—		Ralph Breaks the Internet
"Cool Anymore" (Jordan Davis featuring Julia Michaels)	2019	—	—	—	—	—	—	RIAA: Gold; MC: Gold	Jordan Davis
"Give It to You"	2020	—	—	—	—	— (Note: "Give It to You" did not enter the NZ Heatseekers Singles Chart, but peaked at number 30 on the NZ Hot Singles Chart.)	—		Non-album singles
"Just One Look"	2021	—	—	—	—	—	—		Non-album singles
"—" denotes a recording that did not chart or was not released in that territory.

== Other charted songs ==
List of other charted songs, showing year released, with selected chart positions, certifications and album name
Title	Year	Peak chart positions					Certifications	Album
Title	Year	AUS	IRE	NLD	NZ Hot	SWE Heat.	Certifications	Album
"Like to Be You" (Shawn Mendes featuring Julia Michaels)	2018	78	69	53	— (Note: "Like to Be You" did not enter the NZ Top 40 Singles Chart or Hot Singles Chart, but peaked at number four on the NZ Heatseeker Singles Chart.)	6	RMNZ: Gold	Shawn Mendes
"Into You"	2019	—	—	—	39	—		Inner Monologue Part 1
"17"	2019	—	—	—	40	—		Inner Monologue Part 2
"Little Did I Know"	2021	—	—	—	21	—		Not in Chronological Order
"—" denotes a recording that did not chart or was not released in that territory.

== Guest appearances ==
List of non-single guest appearances, showing artists, albums and credits
Title	Year	Artist(s)	Album	Credits
"Surrender"	2014	Cash Cash	Blood, Sweat & 3 Years	Uncredited vocalist
"Straight Into the Fire"	2015	Zedd	True Colors	Uncredited vocalist
"Daisy"	2015	Zedd	True Colors	Uncredited vocalist
"Trade Hearts"	2015	Jason Derulo	Everything Is 4	Featured artist
"Are You"	2018	—N/a	Fifty Shades Freed	Lead artist
"Keep Talking"	2018	Rita Ora	Phoenix	Featured artist
"Real Life Stuff"	2020	Diplo and Clever	Diplo Presents Thomas Wesley, Chapter 1: Snake Oil	Featured artist
"Gone"	2023	NF	Hope	Featured artist
"Runaway"	2023	King	New Life	Featured artist
"A Wish Worth Making"	2023	—N/a	Wish	Lead artist
"This Wish (Demo)"	2023	—N/a	Wish	Lead artist
"At All Costs (Demo)"	2023	Benjamin Rice	Wish	Lead artist
"I'm a Star (Demo)"	2023	—N/a	Wish	Lead artist
"Knowing What I Know Now (Demo)"	2023	—N/a	Wish	Lead artist
"Louder"	2024	Kygo and Chance Peña	Kygo	Featured artist

== Music videos ==
List of music videos, showing year released and directors
Title	Year	Director	Ref.
"Issues"	2017	Tabitha Denholm	
"Uh Huh"	2017	Emil Nava	
"I Miss You" (Clean Bandit featuring Julia Michaels)	2017	Clean Bandit	
"Heaven"	2018	Sophie Muller	
"Comin' Home" (Keith Urban featuring Julia Michaels)	2018	Andy Hines	
"Jump" (featuring Trippie Redd)	2018	NYLA Projects	
"There's No Way" (LAUV featuring Julia Michaels)	2018	Malia James	
"In This Place"	2018	Unknown	
"What a Time" (featuring Niall Horan)	2019	Boni Mata	
"Happy"	2019	Boni Mata	
"Deep"	2019	Boni Mata	
"Apple"	2019	Clare Gillen	
"Peer Pressure" (James Bay featuring Julia Michaels)	2019	NYLA Projects	
"Okay" (with LANY)	2019	Unknown	
"Body"	2019	Boni Mata	
"17"	2019	Boni Mata	
"If You Need Me"	2019	Blaine Hogan	
"If the World Was Ending" (JP Saxe featuring Julia Michaels)	2019	Jason Lester	
"Cool Anymore" (Jordan Davis featuring Julia Michaels)	2019	Eric Ryan Anderson	
"Heartless" (with Diplo featuring Morgan Wallen)	2020	Brandon Dermer	
"Give It to You"	2020	Motion Music	
"Lie Like This"	2020	Jason Lester	
"All Your Exes"	2021	Blythe Thomas	
"Little Did I Know"	2021	Blythe Thomas	
"Fingers Crossed" (Trevor Daniels featuring Julia Michaels)	2021	Grant Spanier	
"Only One" (with Khea and Becky G featuring Di Genius)	2021	Navs	
