= List of songs written by Justin Tranter =

Justin Tranter is an American singer-songwriter and activist. After reaching notoriety as the lead singer of rock band Semi Precious Weapons, Tranter turned to writing for other artists and developed a close writing partnership with Julia Michaels. During that time, they have scored numerous Billboard chart-toppers and were labelled as one of Rolling Stone's "20 Biggest Breakouts of 2015" for their writing efforts of that year.

This list of songs is split into the full list of contributions and those that have performed in the charts across various countries. Additionally, the international singles and certifications are placed by order of the song's initial release, which may coincide with an album release.

== International singles and certifications ==
List of written or produced contributions that were made singles, with year released, artist(s) involved, selected chart positions, certifications and album name
Title	Year	Peak chart positions										Certifications	Album
Title	Year	US	CAN	AUS	BEL (FL)	NOR	GER	NZ	SWI	SWE	UK	Certifications	Album
"Centuries" (Fall Out Boy)	2014	10	26	55	68	—	71	32	—	60	22	RIAA: x4 Platinum; BPI: Platinum; BVMI: Gold	American Beauty/ American Psycho
"Run" (Nicole Scherzinger)	2014	—	—	—	—	—	—	—	—	—	46		Big Fat Lie
"Good for You" (Selena Gomez or featuring ASAP Rocky)	2015	5	8	10	25	9	29	14	25	24	23	RIAA: x3 Platinum; BPI: Gold; MC: x2 Platinum; ARIA: x2 Platinum; RMNZ: Gold; BVMI: Gold; FIMI: Platinum; GLF: x2 Platinum; IFPI DEN: Platinum; ZPAV: Platinum	Revival
"Love Myself" (Hailee Steinfeld)	2015	30	15	92	4	20	—	19	64	35	180	RIAA: x2 Platinum; BPI: Gold; MC: x2 Platinum; RMNZ: Gold; FIMI: Platinum; GLF: Platinum; IFPI DEN: Gold	Haiz EP
"Cake by the Ocean" (DNCE)	2015	9	7	1	13	33	6	10	13	24	4	RIAA: x5 Platinum; BPI: x2 Platinum; MC: x2 Platinum; ARIA: x3 Platinum; RMNZ: x2 Platinum; BVMI: Platinum; FIMI: x4 Platinum; GLF: Platinum; SNEP: Platinum; ZPAV: x2 Platinum	Swaay EP
"Me & the Rhythm" (Selena Gomez)	2015	—	57	—	—	—	—	—	—	—	—		Revival
"Hands to Myself" (Selena Gomez)	2015	7	5	13	50	18	52	5	40	20	14	RIAA: x2 Platinum; BPI: Platinum; MC: Platinum; ARIA: x2 Platinum; RMNZ: Platinum; IFPI DEN: Platinum; FIMI: Platinum; IFPI NOR: Gold; GLF: x2 Platinum	Revival
"Used to Love You" (Gwen Stefani)	2015	52	57	58	—	—	—	—	—	—	157	RIAA: Gold	This Is What the Truth; Feels Like
"Sorry" (Justin Bieber)	2015	1	1	2	2	2	3	1	2	1	1	RIAA: Diamond; BPI: x4 Platinum; MC: x7 Platinum; ARIA: x7 Platinum; RMNZ: x5 Platinum; BVMI: Platinum; FIMI: x6 Platinum; IFPI DEN: x4 Platinum; GLF: x7 Platinum; SNEP: Diamond	Purpose
"Touch" (Pia Mia)	2015	—	—	47	—	—	—	—	—	—	47	BPI: Silver	Non-album single
"Rock Bottom" (Hailee Steinfeld or featuring DNCE)	2015	—	61	39	—	—	—	—	—	—	—	RIAA: Platinum; RMNZ: Gold	Haiz EP
"Make Me Like You" (Gwen Stefani)	2016	54	62	97	31	—	—	—	—	—	140	RIAA: Gold	This Is What the Truth; Feels Like
"Misery" (Gwen Stefani)	2016	—	—	74	—	—	—	—	—	—	171		This Is What the Truth; Feels Like
"Close" (Nick Jonas featuring Tove Lo)	2016	14	12	37	33	—	61	11	39	41	25	RIAA: Platinum; BPI: Gold; RMNZ: Platinum; GLF: Platinum; IFPI DEN: Gold; FIMI: Gold	Last Year Was Complicated
"Carry Me" (Kygo featuring Julia Michaels)	2016	—	—	77	40	39	—	—	—	—	133	MC: Gold	Cloud Nine
"Slumber Party" (Britney Spears or featuring Tinashe)	2016	86	51	—	—	—	—	—	—	—	77		Glory
"Issues" (Julia Michaels)	2017	11	17	5	8	3	29	11	22	11	10	RIAA: x5 Platinum; BPI: Platinum; MC: x6 Platinum; ARIA: x3 Platinum; RMNZ: Platinum; BVMI: Platinum; FIMI: x2 Platinum; BEA: Platinum; GLF: x4 Platinum; SNEP: Diamond	Nervous System EP
"Believer" (Imagine Dragons)	2017	4	7	33	40	13	23	21	6	22	42	RIAA: x5 Platinum; BPI: x2 Platinum; MC: x7 Platinum; ARIA: x3 Platinum; RMNZ: Platinum; BVMI: Platinum; FIMI: x4 Platinum; IFPI DEN: Platinum; GLF: x2 Platinum; BEA: Platinum	Evolve
"Cold" (Maroon 5 featuring Future)	2017	16	12	27	33	28	43	29	30	25	24	RIAA: Platinum; BPI: Gold; MC: x3 Platinum; ARIA: Platinum; BVMI: Gold; FIMI: x2 Platinum; PMB: x2 Platinum; IFPI DEN: Gold; PME: Gold; SNEP: Gold	Red Pill Blues
"Heavy" (Linkin Park featuring Kiiara)	2017	45	46	33	4	—	12	35	8	82	43	RIAA: Gold; BPI: Silver; ARIA: Gold; BVMI: Gold; FIMI: Gold; IFPI SWI: Gold	One More Light
"Kissing Strangers" (DNCE featuring Nicki Minaj)	2017	—	73	96	—	—	—	—	—	—	—	FIMI: Platinum	DNCE (Jumbo Edition)
"Bad Liar" (Selena Gomez)	2017	20	11	13	45	28	36	17	31	23	21	RIAA: Platinum; BPI: Gold; MC: Platinum; ARIA: Platinum; FIMI: Gold	Non-album single
"Uh-Huh" (Julia Michaels)	2017	—	—	86	—	—	—	—	—	—	—		Nervous System EP
"Bad at Love" (Halsey)	2017	5	22	42	—	—	—	—	—	—	—	RIAA: x5 Platinum; BPI: Silver; MC: x3 Platinum; ARIA: Platinum; PMB: Gold	Hopeless Fountain; Kingdom
"I Don't Know Why" (Imagine Dragons)	2017	—	96	—	—	—	—	—	—	96	—		Evolve
"Walking the Wire" (Imagine Dragons)	2017	—	—	—	—	—	97	—	80	—	—	FIMI: Gold	Evolve
"Friends" (Justin Bieber and BloodPop)	2017	20	4	2	15	1	4	2	3	2	2	RIAA: Platinum; BPI: Platinum; MC: x2 Platinum; ARIA: x2 Platinum; RMNZ: Gold; BVMI: Platinum; FIMI: x2 Platinum; IFPI DEN: Platinum; GLF: Gold; PME: Gold	Non-album single
"If I'm Lucky" (Jason Derulo)	2017	—	75	59	1	—	31	—	77	54	28	BPI: Silver; BVMI: Gold; NVPI: Gold	Non-album single
"You Make It Feel Like Christmas" (Gwen Stefani featuring Blake Shelton)	2017	—	—	—	10	—	33	—	62	—	71	RIAA: Gold	You Make It Feel; Like Christmas
"Help Me Out" (Maroon 5 featuring Julia Michaels)	2017	—	80	83	—	—	—	—	—	—	—		Red Pill Blues
"Into It" (Camila Cabello)	2018	—	75	—	—	—	—	—	—	—	—		Camila
"Make Me Feel" (Janelle Monae)	2018	99	98	—	3	—	—	—	—	—	74	RIAA: Gold	Dirty Computer
"Thru Your Phone" (Cardi B)	2018	50	80	—	—	—	—	—	—	—	—	RIAA: Platinum	Invasion of Privacy
"Valentine" (5 Seconds of Summer)	2018	—	—	85	19	—	—	—	—	—	—		Youngblood
"I'm a Mess" (Bebe Rexha)	2018	35	25	41	17	18	86	18	93	—	77	RIAA: Platinum; BPI: Silver; MC: x2 Platinum; ARIA: Platinum; PMB: x3 Platinum; ZPAV: Platinum	Expectations
"Natural" (Imagine Dragons)	2018	13	12	28	5	9	16	37	3	39	49	BPI: Silver; MC: Platinum; BEA: Gold; IFPI AUT: Gold; BVMI: Gold; FIMI: Platinum; ZPAV: x3 Platinum; AFP: Platinum; AMPFV: Gold; SNEP: Gold	Origins
"There's No Way" (Lauv featuring Julia Michaels)	2018	—	—	37	17	—	—	—	86	94	—	RIAA: Gold; ARIA: Platinum	Non-album single
"Swan Song" (Dua Lipa)	2019	—	99	68	50	—	99	—	96	67	24	ZPAV: Gold	Alita: Battle Angel OST
"What a Time" (Julia Michaels featuring Niall Horan)	2019	—	95	—	—	—	—	—	—	—	—	MC: Platinum	Inner Monologue Part 1
"Fake Smile" (Ariana Grande)	2019	26	25	22	—	—	—	—	—	54	—		Thank U, Next
"The First One" (Astrid S)	2019	—	—	—	—	5	—	—	—	—	—		Trust Issues EP
"Parents" (Yungblud)	2019	—	—	—	31	—	—	—	—	—	—		The Underrated Youth EP
"Easy" (Camila Cabello)	2019	—	82	76	—	—	—	—	—	—	86		Romance
"Lose You to Love Me" (Selena Gomez)	2019	1	1	2	7	2	7	2	2	6	3	RIAA: x2 Platinum; BPI: Platinum; MC: x2 Platinum; ARIA: x2 Platinum; RMNZ: Gold; BEA: Gold; IFPI NOR: Platinum; FIMI: Gold; PME: Gold; SNEP: Gold	Rare
"Look at Her Now" (Selena Gomez)	2019	27	13	29	9	15	43	23	20	53	26	ZPAV: Gold	Rare
"Invisible" (Zara Larsson)	2019	—	—	—	—	—	—	—	—	44	—		Klaus OST
"Tongue Tied" (Marshmello, Yungblud and Blackbear)	2019	—	—	—	83	—	100	—	—	—	62		Non-album single
"Living Proof" (Camila Cabello)	2019	—	84	—	—	—	—	—	—	—	—		Romance
"Stupid" (Tate McRae)	2019	—	60	—	—	—	—	—	—	—	—	MC: Gold	All the Things I Never Said EP
"Dance Again" (Selena Gomez)	2020	—	96	—	—	—	—	—	—	—	—		Rare
"Boyfriend" (Selena Gomez)	2020	59	66	54	41	—	86	—	63	—	55		Rare: Deluxe Edition
"Alice" (Lady Gaga)	2020	84	78	59	—	—	—	—	—	—	29		Chromatica
"911" (Lady Gaga)	2020	—	85	76	—	—	—	—	—	—	—	FIMI: Gold	Chromatica
"Take Care of You" (Ella Henderson)	2020	—	—	—	—	—	—	—	—	—	50		TBA
"Love Me Land" (Zara Larsson)	2020	—	—	—	—	—	—	—	—	8	—	GLF: Gold	Poster Girl
"Cotton Candy" (Yungblud)	2020	—	—	—	46	—	—	—	—	—	98		Weird!
"Baby, I'm Jealous" (Bebe Rexha featuring Doja Cat)	2020	58	—	60	—	—	—	—	—	—	86		Better Mistakes

== Full discography ==
Year	Artist	Song	Album
2013	Bleu	"Endwell" feat. Justin Tranter and Mike Taylor	To Hell with You
2013	Timeflies	"I Choose U"	After Hours
2014	Breathe Carolina	"Please Don't Say"	Savages
2014	Breathe Carolina	"Mistakes"	Savages
2014	Victoria Duffield	"Cherry Red" feat. Jerzee	Accelerate
2014	Fall Out Boy	"Centuries"	American Beauty/American Psycho
2014	Nicole Scherzinger	"Run"	Big Fat Lie
2014	Nicole Scherzinger	"Cold World	Big Fat Lie
2015	Fifth Harmony	"Like Mariah" feat. Tyga	Reflection
2015	Seven Lions	"Lose Myself" feat. Lynn Gunn	The Throes of Winter EP
2015	Kelly Clarkson	"Nostalgic"	Piece by Piece
2015	Rich White Ladies	"Wimbledon"	Rich White Ladies EP
2015	Courtney Love	"Killer Radio"	Miss Narcissist EP
2015	Selena Gomez	"Good for You" solo or feat. ASAP Rocky	Revival
2015	Hailee Steinfeld	"Love Myself"	Haiz EP
2015	Timeflies	"Prosecco"	Just for Fun
2015	DNCE	"Cake by the Ocean"	Swaay EP
2015	Selena Gomez	"Me & the Rhythm"	Revival
2015	Selena Gomez	"Revival"	Revival
2015	Selena Gomez	"Hands to Myself"	Revival
2015	Selena Gomez	"Body Heat"	Revival
2015	Selena Gomez	"Perfect"	Revival
2015	Jussie Smollett	"Born to Love"	Empire OST
2015	Gwen Stefani	"Used to Love You"	This Is What the Truth Feels Like
2015	Justin Bieber	"Sorry"	Purpose
2015	DNCE	"Pay My Rent"	Swaay EP
2015	DNCE	"Jinx"	Swaay EP
2015	Pia Mia	"Touch"	Non-album single
2015	Hailee Steinfeld	"You're Such A"	Haiz EP
2015	Hailee Steinfeld	"Rock Bottom" solo or feat. DNCE	Haiz EP
2015	Hailee Steinfeld	"Hell Nos and Headphones"	Haiz EP
2015	Shapov	"Our World" feat. Justin Tranter	Axtone Ten
2016	Gwen Stefani	"Make Me Like You"	This Is What the Truth Feels Like
2016	Simple Plan	"Problem Child"	Taking One for the Team
2016	The Knocks	"Tied to You" feat. Justin Tranter	55
2016	Jordan Smith	"Leave a Little Light On"	Something Beautiful
2016	Gwen Stefani	"Misery"	This Is What the Truth Feels Like
2016	Gwen Stefani	"You're My Favourite"	This Is What the Truth Feels Like
2016	Gwen Stefani	"Where Would I Be?"	This Is What the Truth Feels Like
2016	Gwen Stefani	"Truth"	This Is What the Truth Feels Like
2016	Gwen Stefani	"Send Me a Picture"	This Is What the Truth Feels Like
2016	Gwen Stefani	"Red Flag"	This Is What the Truth Feels Like
2016	Gwen Stefani	"Asking 4 It" feat. Fetty Wap	This Is What the Truth Feels Like
2016	Gwen Stefani	"Naughty"	This Is What the Truth Feels Like
2016	Gwen Stefani	"Me Without You"	This Is What the Truth Feels Like
2016	Gwen Stefani	"Rare"	This Is What the Truth Feels Like
2016	Gwen Stefani	"Loveable"	This Is What the Truth Feels Like
2016	Gwen Stefani	"Rocket Ship"	This Is What the Truth Feels Like
2016	Gwen Stefani	"Getting Warmer"	This Is What the Truth Feels Like
2016	Gwen Stefani	"Obsessed"	This Is What the Truth Feels Like
2016	Gwen Stefani	"Splash"	This Is What the Truth Feels Like
2016	Gwen Stefani	"War Paint"	This Is What the Truth Feels Like
2016	Nick Jonas	"Close" feat. Tove Lo	Last Year Was Complicated
2016	Erika Jayne	"How Many Fucks"	Non-album single
2016	Kygo	"Carry Me" feat. Julia Michaels	Cloud Nine
2016	Fifth Harmony	"Dope"	7/27
2016	Various artists	"Hands"	Non-album single
2016	Goldroom	"Lying to You"	West of the West
2016	Stanaj	"Sleep Alone"	The Preview
2016	Laura Marano	"La La"	Non-album single
2016	Britney Spears	"Invitation"	Glory
2016	Britney Spears	"Do You Wanna Come Over?"	Glory
2016	Britney Spears	"Slumber Party" solo or feat. Tinashe	Glory
2016	Britney Spears	"Just Like Me"	Glory
2016	Britney Spears	"Better"	Glory
2016	Britney Spears	"Change Your Mind (No Seas Cortes)"	Glory
2016	Dagny	"Fight Sleep"	Ultraviolet EP
2016	Dagny	"Too Young"	Ultraviolet EP
2016	Vice	"Steady 1234" feat. Jasmine Thompson and Skizzy Mars	Non-album single
2016	JoJo	"Music."	Mad Love
2016	JoJo	"I Can Only" feat. Alessia Cara	Mad Love
2016	JoJo	"Edibles"	Mad Love
2016	Kacey Musgraves	"Ribbons and Bows"	A Very Kacey Christmas
2016	DNCE	"DNCE"	DNCE
2016	DNCE	"Blown" feat. Kent Jones	DNCE
2016	DNCE	"Good Day"	DNCE
2016	DNCE	"Naked"	DNCE
2016	DNCE	"Zoom"	DNCE
2016	John Legend	"What You Do to Me"	Darkness and Light
2016	John Legend	"Love You Anyway"	Darkness and Light
2017	Julia Michaels	"Issues"	Nervous System EP
2017	Sofia Carson	"Back to Beautiful" feat. Alan Walker	Non-album single
2017	Imagine Dragons	"Believer"	Evolve
2017	DNCE	"Forever"	The Lego Batman Movie OST
2017	Maroon 5	"Cold" feat. Future	Red Pill Blues
2017	Linkin Park	"Heavy" feat. Kiiara	One More Light
2017	Betty Who	"Free to Fly" feat. Warren G	The Valley
2017	Betty Who	"Make You Memories"	The Valley
2017	DNCE	"Kissing Strangers" feat. Nicki Minaj	Non-album single
2017	Skylar Stecker	"How Did We"	Everything, Everything OST
2017	Selena Gomez	"Bad Liar"	Non-album single
2017	Jasmine Thompson	"Wanna Know Love"	Wonderland EP
2017	Jasmine Thompson	"Drama"	Wonderland EP
2017	Jasmine Thompson	"Words"	Wonderland EP
2017	Shakira	"When a Woman"	El Dorado
2017	Julia Michaels	"Uh Huh"	Nervous System EP
2017	Halsey	"Bad at Love"	Hopeless Fountain Kingdom
2017	Imagine Dragons	"I Don't Know Why"	Evolve
2017	Imagine Dragons	"Walking the Wire"	Evolve
2017	Imagine Dragons	"Start Over"	Evolve
2017	The Vamps	"Paper Hearts"	Night & Day: Night Edition
2017	Julia Michaels	"Worst in Me"	Nervous System EP
2017	Julia Michaels	"Make It Up to You"	Nervous System EP
2017	Julia Michaels	"Just Do It"	Nervous System EP
2017	Julia Michaels	"Pink"	Nervous System EP
2017	Oliver	"Chemicals" feat. MNDR	Full Circle
2017	Kesha	"Finding You"	Rainbow
2017	Kesha	"Boots"	Rainbow
2017	Justin Bieber	"Friends" with BloodPop	Non-album single
2017	In Real Life	"Eyes Closed"	She Do
2017	Sofia Carson	"Ins and Outs"	Non-album single
2017	Jason Derulo	"If I'm Lucky"	Non-album single
2017	Against the Current	"Legends Never Die"	Non-album single
2017	Superfruit	"How You Feeling?"	Future Friends
2017	Gwen Stefani	"You Make It Feel Like Christmas" feat. Blake Shelton	You Make It Feel Like Christmas
2017	Robin Schulz	"Like You Mean It" feat. Rhys	Uncovered
2017	Gwen Stefani	"My Gift Is You"	You Make It Feel Like Christmas
2017	Gwen Stefani	"When I Was a Little Girl"	You Make It Feel Like Christmas
2017	Gwen Stefani	"Under the Christmas Lights"	You Make It Feel Like Christmas
2017	Gwen Stefani	"Never Kissed Anyone with Blue Eyes Before You"	You Make It Feel Like Christmas
2017	Gwen Stefani	"Christmas Eve"	You Make It Feel Like Christmas
2017	Bea Miller	"Repercussions"	Aurora
2017	Maroon 5	"Help Me Out" with Julia Michaels	Red Pill Blues
2017	Nick Jonas	"Home"	Ferdinand OST
2017	Now United	"Summer in the City"	Non-album single
2018	Camila Cabello	"Into It"	Camila
2018	Julia Michaels	"Are You"	Fifty Shades Freed OST
2018	Janelle Monae	"Make Me Feel"	Dirty Computer
2018	Calise Cromwell	"Don't Call Back"	Non-album single
2018	Billy Raffoul	"Acoustic"	1975 EP
2018	Swt Valli Hi	"WTLJ"	Non-album single
2018	Bleachers	"Keeping a Secret"	Love, Simon OST
2018	Cardi B	"Thru Your Phone"	Invasion of Privacy
2018	Keith Urban	"Gemini"	Graffiti U
2018	Leon Bridges	"Beyond"	Good Thing
2018	Leon Bridges	"Forgive You"	Good Thing
2018	Leon Bridges	"Mrs."	Good Thing
2018	Raye	"Crew" with Ray BLK and Kojo Funds	Side Tapes
2018	Julia Michaels	"Jump" feat. Trippie Redd	Non-album single
2018	Brynn Cartelli	"Walk My Way"	Non-album single
2018	Juice Wrld	"Black & White"	Goodbye & Good Riddance
2018	HMLTD	"Pictures of You"	Hate Music Last Time Delete
2018	Bebe Rexha	"I'm a Mess"	Expectations
2018	Christina Aguilera	"Right Moves" feat. Keida and Shenseea	Liberation
2018	5 Seconds of Summer	"Valentine"	Youngblood
2018	5 Seconds of Summer	"Talk Fast"	Youngblood
2018	5 Seconds of Summer	"Moving Along"	Youngblood
2018	5 Seconds of Summer	"If Walls Could Talk"	Youngblood
2018	5 Seconds of Summer	"Empty Wallets"	Youngblood
2018	5 Seconds of Summer	"Monster Among Men"	Youngblood
2018	5 Seconds of Summer	"Meet You There"	Youngblood
2018	5 Seconds of Summer	"When You Walk Away"	Youngblood
2018	5 Seconds of Summer	"Best Friend"	Youngblood
2018	Shea Diamond	"Keisha Complexion"	Seen It All EP
2018	Shea Diamond	"Good Pressure"	Seen It All EP
2018	Shea Diamond	"Seen It All"	Seen It All EP
2018	Years & Years	"Hallelujah"	Palo Santo
2018	Years & Years	"Preacher"	Palo Santo
2018	Jess Kent	"Bass Bumps"	Non-album single
2018	Imagine Dragons	"Natural"	Origins
2018	Bayli	"Out for Love"	Non-album single
2018	Liam Payne	"Home with You"	First Time EP
2018	Shawn Wasabi	"Squeez@" feat. Raychel Jay	Non-album single
2018	Jess Kent	"Girl"	Non-album single
2018	The Glitch Mob	"Rise" feat. Mako and The Word Alive	League of Legends OST
2018	Lauv	"There's No Way" feat. Julia Michaels	Non-album single
2018	Lady Gaga	"Heal Me"	A Star is Born OST
2018	Alma	"Cowboy"	Non-album single
2018	Shawn Wasabi	"Mango Love" feat. Satica	Mangotale
2018	Gwen Stefani	"Cheer for the Elves"	You Make It Feel Like Christmas: Deluxe Edition
2018	Gwen Stefani	"Secret Santa"	You Make It Feel Like Christmas: Deluxe Edition
2018	Glowie	"Body"	Where I Belong
2018	K/DA	"Pop/Stars" feat. (G)I-dle, Madison Beer and Jaira Burns	Non-album single
2018	Imagine Dragons	"Only"	Origins
2018	Isabela Merced	"I'll Stay"	Non-album single
2018	Rita Ora	"Keep Talking" feat. Julia Michaels	Phoenix
2019	Alma	"When I Die"	Non-album single
2019	Julia Michaels	"Happy"	Inner Monologue Part 1
2019	Julia Michaels	"What a Time" feat. Niall Horan	Inner Monologue Part 1
2019	Dua Lipa	"Swan Song"	Alita: Battle Angel OST
2019	Illenium	"Crashing" feat. Bahari	Ascend
2019	Terror Jr	"Yamaguchi"	Unfortunately, Terror Jr
2019	Ariana Grande	"Fake Smile"	Thank U, Next
2019	Bea Miller	"It's Not U It's Me" feat. 6lack	Non-album single
2019	Sara Bareilles	"No Such Thing"	Amidst the Chaos
2019	Sara Bareilles	"Poetry By Dead Men"	Amidst the Chaos
2019	Stephanie Rice	"Pages"	Non-album single
2019	Tritonal	"Little Bit of Love" feat. Rachel Platten	U & Me
2019	Astrid S	"The First One"	Trust Issues EP
2019	Yungblud	"Parents"	The Underrated Youth EP
2019	Shea Diamond	"Don't Shoot"	Non-album single
2019	Jonas Brothers	"Hesitate"	Happiness Begins
2019	Jonas Brothers	"First"	Happiness Begins
2019	X Ambassadors	"Recover"	Orion
2019	Bea Miller	"Feel Something"	Non-album single
2019	Julia Michaels	"Priest"	Inner Monologue Part 2
2019	Julia Michaels	"Shouldn't Have Said It"	Inner Monologue Part 2
2019	Tori Kelly	"Language"	Inspired by True Events
2019	G Flip	"Stupid"	About Us
2019	King Princess	"Ain't Together"	Cheap Queen
2019	Meghan Trainor	"Genetics" solo or featuring The Pussycat Dolls	Treat Myself
2019	HMLTD	"Loaded"	West of Eden
2019	Cashmere Cat	"Without You"	Princess Catgirl
2019	James Arthur	"Finally Feel Good"	You
2019	Anthony Ramos	"Mind Over Matter"	The Good & The Bad
2019	Yungblud	"Original Me" feat. Dan Reynolds	Weird!
2019	Camila Cabello	"Easy"	Romance
2019	Shawn Wasabi	"Marble Tea" feat. Raychel Jay	Mangotale
2019	Grace VanderWaal	"I Don't Like You"	Letters, Vol. 1
2019	Selena Gomez	"Lose You to Love Me"	Rare
2019	Selena Gomez	"Look at Her Now"	Rare
2019	Selena Gomez	"Dance Again (Selena Gomez song)"	Rare
2019	Selena Gomez	"Let Me Get Me"	Rare
2019	Selena Gomez	"Kinda Crazy"	Rare
2019	Isabela Merced	"Papi"	Non-album single
2019	Dove Cameron	"So Good"	Non-album single
2019	Bea Miller	"That Bitch"	Non-album single
2019	Missio	"Sing to Me"	Death Stranding: Timefall
2019	Zara Larsson	"Invisible"	Klaus OST
2019	Marshmello	"Tongue Tied" with Yungblud and Blackbear	Non-album single
2019	Camila Cabello	"Living Proof"	Romance
2019	Kesha	"My Own Dance"	High Road
2019	Tate McRae	"Stupid"	All the Things I Never Said
2019	Camila Cabello	"Dream of You"	Romance
2020	Selena Gomez	"Dance Again"	Rare
2020	Selena Gomez	"Let Me Get Me"	Rare
2020	Selena Gomez	"Kinda Crazy"	Rare
2020	Shawn Wasabi	"Home Run" feat. Raychel Jay	Mangotale
2020	Dua Lipa	"Boys Will Be Boys"	Future Nostalgia
2020	Billy Raffoul	"In the Name of Love"	A Few More Hours at YYZ EP
2020	Selena Gomez	"Boyfriend"	Rare: Deluxe Edition
2020	Selena Gomez	"She"	Rare: Deluxe Edition
2020	The Aces	"My Phone is Trying to Kill Me"	Under My Influence
2020	Alma	"LA Money"	Have U Seen Her?
2020	Alma	"Nightmare"	Have U Seen Her?
2020	Alma	"Mama"	Have U Seen Her?
2020	Isabela Merced	"Chocolate"	The Better Half of Me EP
2020	Isabela Merced	"The Chase"	The Better Half of Me EP
2020	Lady Gaga	"Alice"	Chromatica
2020	Lady Gaga	"911"	Chromatica
2020	Twice	"More & More"	More & More EP
2020	Ella Henderson	"Take Care of You"	Non-album single
2020	Tom Morello	"Stand Up" with Shea Diamond, Dan Reynolds and The Bloody Beetroots	Non-album single
2020	Zara Larsson	"Love Me Land"	Poster Girl
2020	The Chicks	"Sleep at Night"	Gaslighter
2020	The Chicks	"Texas Man"	Gaslighter
2020	The Chicks	"My Best Friend's Weddings"	Gaslighter
2020	The Chicks	"Young Man"	Gaslighter
2020	Kiiara	"I Still Do"	Lil Kiiwi
2020	Yungblud	"Lemonade" with Denzel Curry	A Weird! AF Halloween EP
2020	Pvris	"Wish You Well"	Use Me
2020	Isabela Merced	"Don't Go" with Danna Paola	Non-album single
2020	Bebe Rexha	"Baby, I'm Jealous" feat. Doja Cat	Better Mistakes
2020	Yungblud	"Cotton Candy"	Weird!
2020	Bea Miller	"Wisdom Teeth"	Elated! EP
2020	Demi Lovato	"Commander in Chief"	Non-album single
2020	YDE	"Stopped Buying Diamonds"	Non-album single
2020	Bea Miller	"Feel Something Different" with Amine	Elated! EP
2020	Bea Miller	"Hallelujah"	Elated! EP
2020	Bea Miller	"Forever Is a Lie"	Elated! EP
2020	Bea Miller	"Self Crucify"	Elated! EP
2020	Kennedi	"I Don't Wanna Like You Yet"	Self EP
2020	Anne-Marie	"Think of Christmas"	Happiest Season OST
2020	Bebe Rexha	"Blame It on Christmas" with Shea Diamond	Happiest Season OST
2020	Shea Diamond	"Mrs. Claus"	Happiest Season OST
2020	Brandy Clark	"Only Time of Year"	Happiest Season OST
2020	Kennedi	"Christmas Morning"	Happiest Season OST
2020	Charlie Hanson	"Chosen Family"	Happiest Season OST
2020	YDE	"BlindLife"	Non-album single
2020	Yungblud	"Love Song"	Weird!
2020	Britney Spears	"Matches" with Backstreet Boys	Glory: Super Deluxe
2020	Citizen Queen	"Call Me Queen"	Non-album single
2021	Citizen Queen	"No Ego"	Non-album single
2021	Zara Larsson	"Right Here"	Poster Girl
2021	Zara Larsson	"Poster Girl"	Poster Girl
2021	Zara Larsson	"FFF"	Poster Girl
2021	Ali Gatie	"Bigger Person"	The Idea of Her
2021	Leon Bridges	"Steam"	Gold-Diggers Sound
2021	Shea Diamond	"Smile"	Smile (Single)
2021	Demi Lovato	"Lonely People"	Dancing with the Devil... The Art of Starting Over
2021	Demi Lovato	"The Way You Don't Look at Me"	Dancing with the Devil... The Art of Starting Over
2021	Demi Lovato	"Melon Cake"	Dancing with the Devil... The Art of Starting Over
2021	Demi Lovato	"The Kind of Lover I Am"	Dancing with the Devil... The Art of Starting Over
2021	Demi Lovato	"15 Minutes"	Dancing with the Devil... The Art of Starting Over
2021	Demi Lovato	"Good Place"	Dancing with the Devil... The Art of Starting Over
2021	Demi Lovato	"Gray"	Dancing with the Devil... The Art of Starting Over
2021	Citizen Queen	"Y"	Non-album single
2021	JoJo	"Creature of Habit"	Non-album single
2021	Jake Wesley Rogers	"Weddings and Funerals"	Pluto EP
2021	Jake Wesley Rogers	"Middle of Love"	Pluto EP
2021	Jake Wesley Rogers	"Under the Sun"	Pluto EP
2021	Jake Wesley Rogers	"Momentary"	Pluto EP
2021	Bebe Rexha	"Mama"	Better Mistakes
2021	Bebe Rexha	"Break My Heart Myself (feat. Travis Barker)"	Better Mistakes
2021	Bebe Rexha	"Better Mistakes"	Better Mistakes
2021	Bebe Rexha	"Empty"	Better Mistakes
2021	Bebe Rexha	"Death Row"	Better Mistakes
2022	YDE	"Where's the Fun in Truth"	SEND HELP
2022	YDE	"Normal to Feel"	SEND HELP
2022	YDE	"Uncomfortable"	SEND HELP
2022	YDE	"Old Her"	SEND HELP
2022	YDE	"People Can Change"	SEND HELP
2022	YDE	"Never Too Young"	SEND HELP
2022	Sofia Carson	"Come Back Home (Sofia Carson song)"	Purple Hearts (soundtrack)
2022	Sofia Carson	"I Didn't Know"	Purple Hearts (soundtrack)
2022	Sofia Carson	"I Hate the Way"	Purple Hearts (soundtrack)
2022	Sofia Carson	"Blue Side of the Sky"	Purple Hearts (soundtrack)
2022	Billy Porter and Shea Diamond	"Impossible is Possible"	Anything's Possible (film) OST
2022	Billy Porter	"But I Like It"	Anything's Possible (film) OST
2022	Michaela Jaé Rodriguez	"Candy Cigarette"	Anything's Possible (film) OST
2022	Brittany Campbell	"Moons"	Anything's Possible (film) OST
2022	Jake Wesley Rogers	"Call it Love"	LOVE EP
2022	Jake Wesley Rogers	"Lavender Forever"	LOVE EP
2022	Jake Wesley Rogers	"Hindsight"	LOVE EP
2022	Jake Wesley Rogers	"Dark Bird"	LOVE EP
2022	Imagine Dragons	"Waves"	Mercury – Acts 1 & 2
2022	Imagine Dragons	"My Life"	Mercury – Acts 1 & 2
2022	Imagine Dragons	"Lonely"	Mercury – Acts 1 & 2
2022	Imagine Dragons with JID	"Enemy (Imagine Dragons and JID song)"	Mercury – Acts 1 & 2
2022	Måneskin	"Supermodel (Måneskin song)"	Rush!
2022	Chappell Roan	"My Kink is Karma"	The Rise and Fall of a Midwest Princess
2022	John Legend	"Waterslide"	Legend (John Legend album)
2022	Raye	"Hard out Here"	My 21st Century Blues
2022	Tayla Parx	"Rich"	TBA
2022	Sofia Carson	"Timeless"	Sofia Carson
2022	Sofia Carson	Two Tears in a Bucket	Sofia Carson
2022	Ari Abdul	"HUSH"	Fallen Angel EP
2023	Kesha	"Hate Me Harder"	Gag Order (album)
2023	Måneskin	"HONEY (ARE U COMING?)"	Rush!
2023	TALK	"A Little Bit Happy"	Lord of the Flies & Birds & Bees
2023	TALK	"Wasteland"	Lord of the Flies & Birds & Bees
2023	TALK	"History"	Lord of the Flies & Birds & Bees
2023	TALK	"Fall 4 U"	Lord of the Flies & Birds & Bees
2023	TALK	"Talking to Aliens"	Lord of the Flies & Birds & Bees
2023	TALK	"This Is It"	Lord of the Flies & Birds & Bees
2023	Reneé Rapp	"Pretty Girls"	Snow Angel
2023	Reneé Rapp	"Gemini Moon"	Snow Angel
2023	Reneé Rapp	"I Wish"	Snow Angel
2023	Reneé Rapp	"Poison Poison"	Snow Angel
2023	Baby Tate	"Jersey"	Baby Tate Presents - Sexploration: The Musical
2023	Baby Tate	"Luv Everybody"	Baby Tate Presents - Sexploration: The Musical
2023	BoyWithUke	"Blue"	Lucid Dreams
2023	Billy Porter	"Baby Was a Dancer"	Black Mona Lisa
2023	Billy Porter	"Fashion"	Black Mona Lisa
2023	Billy Porter	"Broke a Sweat"	Black Mona Lisa
2023	Billy Porter	"More to Learn"	Black Mona Lisa
2023	Billy Porter	"New Shoes"	Black Mona Lisa
2023	Billy Porter	"Funk Is On the One"	Black Mona Lisa
2023	Billy Porter	"Black Mona Lisa"	Black Mona Lisa
2023	Paravi	"Revenge Body"	PARAVI
2023	Baek A-yeon	"LIME (I'm So)"	LIME (I'm So)
2023	Jake Wesley Rogers	"Window"	Window
2023	Idina Menzel	"My Love For Life"	Drama Queen
2023	Miley Cyrus	"River"	Endless Summer Vacation
2023	John Legend	"Don't Need to Sleep"	Don't Need to Sleep
2023	The Cast of Grease: Rise of the Pink Ladies	"Different This Year"	Grease: Rise of the Pink Ladies (Original Soundtrack)
2023	The Cast of Grease: Rise of the Pink Ladies	"Good Girl Act"	Grease: Rise of the Pink Ladies (Original Soundtrack)
2023	The Cast of Grease: Rise of the Pink Ladies	"New Cool"	Grease: Rise of the Pink Ladies (Original Soundtrack)
2023	The Cast of Grease: Rise of the Pink Ladies	"Different This Year" (Reprise)	Grease: Rise of the Pink Ladies (Original Soundtrack)
2023	The Cast of Grease: Rise of the Pink Ladies	"Girl Gang"	Grease: Rise of the Pink Ladies (Original Soundtrack)
2023	The Cast of Grease: Rise of the Pink Ladies	"I Want More"	Grease: Rise of the Pink Ladies (Original Soundtrack)
2023	The Cast of Grease: Rise of the Pink Ladies	"World Without Boys"	Grease: Rise of the Pink Ladies (Original Soundtrack)
2023	The Cast of Grease: Rise of the Pink Ladies	"Same Sky"	Grease: Rise of the Pink Ladies (Original Soundtrack)
2023	The Cast of Grease: Rise of the Pink Ladies	"In the Club"	Grease: Rise of the Pink Ladies (Original Soundtrack)
2023	The Cast of Grease: Rise of the Pink Ladies	"Take the Wheel"	Grease: Rise of the Pink Ladies (Original Soundtrack)
2023	The Cast of Grease: Rise of the Pink Ladies	"Sorry to Distract"	Grease: Rise of the Pink Ladies (Original Soundtrack)
2023	The Cast of Grease: Rise of the Pink Ladies	"Carelessly"	Grease: Rise of the Pink Ladies (Original Soundtrack)
2023	The Cast of Grease: Rise of the Pink Ladies	"Pointing Fingers"	Grease: Rise of the Pink Ladies (Original Soundtrack)
2023	The Cast of Grease: Rise of the Pink Ladies	"The Boom"	Grease: Rise of the Pink Ladies (Original Soundtrack)
2023	The Cast of Grease: Rise of the Pink Ladies	"Merely Players"	Grease: Rise of the Pink Ladies (Original Soundtrack)
2023	The Cast of Grease: Rise of the Pink Ladies	"Election Song"	Grease: Rise of the Pink Ladies (Original Soundtrack)
2023	The Cast of Grease: Rise of the Pink Ladies	"Girls Can't Drive"	Grease: Rise of the Pink Ladies (Original Soundtrack)
2023	The Cast of Grease: Rise of the Pink Ladies	"Finding My Light"	Grease: Rise of the Pink Ladies (Original Soundtrack)
2023	The Cast of Grease: Rise of the Pink Ladies	"High Rollin"	Grease: Rise of the Pink Ladies (Original Soundtrack)
2023	The Cast of Grease: Rise of the Pink Ladies	"Hit Me Again"	Grease: Rise of the Pink Ladies (Original Soundtrack)
2023	The Cast of Grease: Rise of the Pink Ladies	"Pulling Strings"	Grease: Rise of the Pink Ladies (Original Soundtrack)
2023	The Cast of Grease: Rise of the Pink Ladies	"Crushing Me"	Grease: Rise of the Pink Ladies (Original Soundtrack)
2023	The Cast of Grease: Rise of the Pink Ladies	"Hand Jive"	Grease: Rise of the Pink Ladies (Original Soundtrack)
2023	The Cast of Grease: Rise of the Pink Ladies	"Land Don't Look So Bad"	Grease: Rise of the Pink Ladies (Original Soundtrack)
2023	The Cast of Grease: Rise of the Pink Ladies	"Face to Face"	Grease: Rise of the Pink Ladies (Original Soundtrack)
2023	The Cast of Grease: Rise of the Pink Ladies	"I'm in Love"	Grease: Rise of the Pink Ladies (Original Soundtrack)
2023	The Cast of Grease: Rise of the Pink Ladies	"Brutal Honesty"	Grease: Rise of the Pink Ladies (Original Soundtrack)
2023	The Cast of Grease: Rise of the Pink Ladies	"Please Please Please"	Grease: Rise of the Pink Ladies (Original Soundtrack)
2023	The Cast of Grease: Rise of the Pink Ladies	"All In"	Grease: Rise of the Pink Ladies (Original Soundtrack)
2023	The Cast of Grease: Rise of the Pink Ladies	"Think Pink"	Grease: Rise of the Pink Ladies (Original Soundtrack)
2024	Chappell Roan	"Good Luck, Babe!"	Non-album single
2024	Le Sserafim	"Swan Song"	Easy
2024	Crash Adams	"Good Side"	Crashing Into Your Living Room, Vol. 1
2024	Chinchilla	"MF Diamond"	Flytrap
2024	Blu DeTiger	"Moxie"	All I Ever Want Is Everything
2024	Russell Dickerson	"Good Day to Have a Great Day"	Good Day To Have A Great Day
2024	Saweetie	"NANi"	NANi
2024	Jake Wesley Rogers	"Loser"	Loser
2024	Katseye	"Tonight I Might"	SIS (Soft Is Strong)
2024	Rose Gray	"Angel of Satisfaction"	Louder, Please
2024	Rose Gray	"Switch"	Louder, Please
2024	David Kushner	"Love Is Going to Kill Us"	The Dichotomy
2024	Caroline Kingsbury	"Take My Phone Away"	Take My Phone Away
2024	Keith Urban	"Love Is Hard"	High
2024	YDE	"Defense of Love"	8
2024	Nicki Minaj	"Love Me Enough"	Pink Friday 2
2025	Cynthia Erivo	"Play The Woman"	I Forgive You
2025	Demi Lovato	"Sorry To Myself"	It's Not That Deep
2025	Joe Jonas	"Parachute"	Music for People Who Believe in Love
2025	Selena Gomez & Benny Blanco	"Call Me When You Break Up"	I Said I Love You First
2025	Rose Gray	"Everything Changes (But I Won't)"	Louder, Please
2025	Katseye	"Mean Girls"	Beautiful Chaos
2025	Julia Michaels	"Try Your Luck"	Second Self
2025	Naomi Sharon	"Can We Do This Over"	TBA
2025	Katy Perry	"Bandaids"	Non-album single
2025	Jonas Brothers	"Best Night"	A Very Jonas Christmas Movie: Original Soundtrack
2026	Katseye	"Internet Girl"	Non-album single
2026	Katseye	"Pinky Up"	Wild
2026	Le Sserafim	"Boompala"	Pureflow Pt. 1
2026	Le Sserafim, Illit & Katseye	"Iconic by Mistake"	Non-album single
2026	Rose Gray	"Club to Your Arms"	TBA
2026	Rose Gray	"Just Be Bodies"	TBA
2026	Rose Gray	"Blink Twice"	TBA
2026	Katy Perry	"Watch It Burn"	Non-album single
2026	Le Sserafim	"Made My Night"	Made My Night
