= Nervous System (EP) =

EP by Julia Michaels
- Released: July 28, 2017
- Recorded: January 2016; April – May 2017
- Studio: Westlake, MXM, Conway and Henson Recording (Los Angeles, California); Treehouse X Studio (Suffolk, United Kingdom); Wolf Cousins (Stockholm, Sweden)
- Genre: Pop
- Length: 21:55
- Label: Republic
- Producer: Benny Blanco; Julia Michaels; Mattman & Robin; Stargate

Julia Michaels chronology
Futuristic (2012)	Nervous System (2017)	Inner Monologue Part 1 (2019)

Singles from Nervous System
- 1. "Issues" Released: January 13, 2017; 2. "Uh Huh" Released: June 2, 2017; 3. "Worst in Me" Released: September 18, 2017

Nervous System is the third extended play and major-label debut by American singer-songwriter Julia Michaels, released by Republic Records on July 28, 2017. Most of the tracks on the EP were composed by Michaels and her frequent writing partner, Justin Tranter, as well as the EP's producers, Benny Blanco, Stargate and Mattman & Robin, who produced the album alongside Michaels herself. Musically, it is a pop record and lyrically it explores a former romantic relationship of Michaels'.

The album's first single, "Issues", was released on January 13, 2017, and peaked at number 11 on the Billboard Hot 100, alongside charting within the top 10 on charts in Australia, Belgium, Denmark, Norway, and the United Kingdom. "Uh Huh", the second single from Nervous System, was released on June 2, 2017. "Worst in Me", the third and final single from the EP, was released on September 18, 2017.

Upon its release, the EP received mixed to positive reviews from music critics, who complimented the EP's sound but questioned its impact. Commercially, the EP peaked at number 48 on the Billboard 200 and topped the New Zealand Heatseekers Albums chart. The album was also certified Gold by Music Canada (MC). To promote the album, Michaels opened for fellow singer Shawn Mendes on his Illuminate World Tour, specifically on his Oceania leg.

== Background and recording ==
From 2013 to 2016, Julia Michaels became well known for writing songs for Selena Gomez, Justin Bieber, Demi Lovato, Britney Spears, Gwen Stefani and several other artists. When she wrote and recorded the song "Issues" in January 2016, after a fight with her boyfriend, she showed the song to Charlie Walk. Two months later, he signed her a record contract with Republic Records. She had no idea that "Issues" would be a hit, so she decided to record the rest of her EP in April and May 2017. She said to Music Choice:

"I did a mini-album because this is all very new to me, and I didn't wanna do an EP because I feel like that's too little. I feel like that's a chapter and I feel like an album is the book, and I'm not ready for the book".

All the tracks of the EP are brand new songs, Michaels did not bring any rejected songs from other artists or old songs that she wrote. Michaels composed most of the songs with her writing partner Justin Tranter and Stargate, Mattman & Robin and Benny Blanco produced and helped write the songs.

== Composition and lyrical content ==
The record opens with the singer's lead single "Issues", a midtempo song that talks about a relationship between people who have "issues", but love each other enough to work past them. The second single of the EP, "Uh Huh", is described by Mike Wass of Idolator as "brighter, bolder and more instant" than "Issues", as well labeling the chorus as "obscenely catchy". In "Worst in Me" Michaels discusses a troubled relationship. Variety opined that the relationship described in the song is similar to the one in "Issues", but that in "Worst in Me", Michaels is "less hopeful about how it'll turn out".

"Make It Up to You" is an uptempo dance-pop track that talks about Michaels' "wickedness" toward her lover, but in the end, she feels sorry for him. The fifth track on the record, "Just Do It" is a midtempo song that starts with a simple bass melody before incorporating elements such as synthesizers, percussion elements and guitars. "Pink" is described by Michaels as "the most twerky song of the album" and "very explanatory". The last track, "Don't Wanna Think", is the only song on the record written entirely by Michaels and is a piano ballad that follows a basic sequence of F–C–Am–F as its chord progression.

== Singles ==
The EP's lead single, "Issues", was released on the 13th of January, 2017. The song would become Michaels' signature hit, peaking at number 11 on the Billboard Hot 100 in the United States, where it has been certified 5× Platinum by the Recording Industry Association of America (RIAA), for equivalent sales of 5,000,000 units. The song also charted within the top 10 in multiple other countries, including the United Kingdom, Belgium, Norway, Denmark, and Australia. Its highest peak was a position at number 2 on the Ultratop 50 chart in Wallonia, Belgium. The song's music video was released on the 7th of March, 2017, and was directed by Tabitha Denholm.

The second single, "Uh Huh", was released on the 2nd of June, 2017, and was less successful than "Issues", although it would peak at number 5 on the New Zealand Heatseekers chart, alongside being certified Gold by Music Canada (MC) for equivalent sales of 40,000 units. Its music video was released on the 11th of June, 2017, and was directed by Emil Nava. The third single "Worst in Me", was released as the EP's final single on the 18th of September, 2017. The song peaked at number 8 on the New Zealand Heatseekers chart, and was also certified Gold by Music Canada, although it did not have a music video.

== Commercial performance ==
Upon its release, the album charted at number 41 on the Billboard 200 and number 24 on the Digital Albums chart in the United States. Internationally, the album charted at number 41 on the Canadian Albums Chart, where it was certified Gold by Music Canada for equivalent sales of 40,000 units. In Australia, the album charted at number 91 on the ARIA Charts. In Sweden, the album charted at number 24 on the Sverigetopplistan chart. Its highest peak was a position at the top of the New Zealand Heatseekers Albums chart.

== Critical reception ==
Professional ratings
Review scores
Source	Rating
Allmusic	(favourable)
AXS	6.6/10
Pitchfork	6.6/10
Variety	(favourable)

Katherine St. Asaph, writing for Pitchfork, rated the EP 6.6 out of 10, writing that "the songs are refreshingly unique but their impact is varied." She complimented Michaels' "modest persona and writing style she likens to therapy." Chris Willman of Variety wrote that the EP "reveals Michaels as a gifted enough singer and confession-inclined enough songwriter that leaving out the middleman was definitely the way to go." Willman called the EP "even more promising than her resume." Neil Z. Yeung of AllMusic called the EP a "seven-song set of forward-thinking pop." AXS, similar to Pitchfork, would rate the EP 6.6 out of 10.

== Track listing ==
No.	Title	Writer(s)	Producer(s)	Length
1.	"Issues"	Julia Michaels; Benjamin Levin; Tor Erik Hermansen; Mikkel Storleer Eriksen; Justin Tranter	Stargate; Benny Blanco	2:56
2.	"Uh Huh"	Michaels; Mattias Larsson; Robin Fredriksson; Tranter	Mattman & Robin	2:58
3.	"Worst in Me"	Michaels; Larsson; Fredriksson; Tranter	Mattman & Robin	3:26
4.	"Make It Up to You"	Michaels; Larsson; Fredriksson; Tranter	Mattman & Robin	3:35
5.	"Just Do It"	Michaels; Larsson; Fredriksson; Tranter	Mattman & Robin	3:12
6.	"Pink"	Michaels; Larsson; Fredriksson; Tranter	Mattman & Robin	2:48
7.	"Don't Wanna Think"	Michaels	Michaels	2:59
Total length:				21:55

Japanese bonus tracks
No.	Title	Writer(s)	Producer(s)	Length
8.	"Anxiety" (featuring Selena Gomez)	Scott Harris; Gomez; Michaels; Ian Kirkpatrick	Kirkpatrick	3:30
9.	"What a Time" (featuring Niall Horan)	Riley Knapp; Casey Barth; Michaels; Tranter	Kirkpatrick; RKCB	2:53
Total length:				28:17

== Personnel ==
Credits adapted from the liner notes of Nervous System.

Recorded, engineered, mixed and mastered at

- Los Angeles, California (Westlake Studios, MXM Studios, Conway Studios, Henson Recording Studios)
- Suffolk, United Kingdom (Treehouse X Studios)
- New York City (Sterling Sound)
- Partille, Sweden (Studio Borgen)
- Stockholm, Sweden (Wolf Cousins Studios)

Performers and production

- Julia Michaels – vocals (all tracks); background vocals (2, 3, 4, 5, 6); production, piano (7)
- Benny Blanco – production, instrumentation, programming (1)
- Stargate – production, instrumentation, programming (1)
- Justin Tranter – background vocals (2, 5)
- Dave Schwerkolt – engineering (1)
- Chris Sclafani – engineering (1)
- Spike Stent – mixing (all tracks)
- Michael Freeman – assistant engineer mix (1)
- Geoff Swish – assistant engineer mix (1)
- Tom Coyne – mastering (1)
- Randy Merrill – mastering (all tracks)
- Mattman & Robin – production, programming, drums, bass, synths (2, 3, 4, 5, 6); percussion, claps (2, 3, 4, 5); piano (2, 3); toms (2); guitar (2, 4, 5); strings (5)
- Sam Holland – engineering (2, 5)
- Cory Bice – engineering (2, 5)
- Jeremy Lertola – assistant engineering (2, 5)
- Jon Sher – engineering (3, 6)
- Mattias Bylund – strings recording, strings editing, string arrangement, strings (3)
- Mattias Johansson – violin (3)
- Jungen B. Linderholm – cello (3)
- Benjamin Rice – recording (7)

== Charts ==
Weekly chart performance for Nervous System
Chart (2017)	Peak position
Australia (ARIA)	97
Canadian Albums (Billboard)	41
New Zealand Heatseeker Albums (RMNZ)	1
Swedish Albums (Sverigetopplistan)	24
US Billboard 200	48
US Digital albums (Billboard)	24

== Certifications ==
Certifications for Nervous System
Region	Certification	Certified units/sales
Canada (Music Canada)	Gold	40,000^{‡}
^{‡} Sales+streaming figures based on certification alone.
