= Lie to Me (5 Seconds of Summer song) =

Single by 5 Seconds of Summer featuring Julia Michaels

from the album Youngblood
- Released: 21 December 2018
- Length: 2:29
- Label: Capitol
- Songwriters: Ashton Irwin; Luke Hemmings; Calum Hood; Julia Michaels; Alexandra Tamposi; Andrew Watt
- Producer: Andrew Watt

5 Seconds of Summer singles chronology
"Killer Queen" (2018)	"Lie to Me" (2018)	"Who Do You Love" (2019)

Julia Michaels singles chronology
"There’s No Way" (2018)	"Lie to Me" (2018)	"Anxiety" (2019)

Music video
- "Lie to Me" on YouTube

"Lie to Me" is a song by Australian pop rock band 5 Seconds of Summer. It is the third track on the band's third studio album Youngblood, released on 15 June 2018. The song was re-recorded featuring additional vocals by American singer-songwriter Julia Michaels, who also co-wrote the song and was released on 21 December 2018 as the album's fourth and final single.

An acoustic version was released on 1 February 2019.

== Reception ==
Brooke Bajgrowicz of Billboard said "The new version of 'Lie to Me' has Julia Michaels' soft vocals changing up the narrative. While the original lyrics have the guys broken over a love not lining up, the words in the latest rendition readjust to explore both sides of the relationship."

Daniel Kreps of Rolling Stone described the acoustic version as "a slowed-down, piano-led take" and described the accompanying music video as picturesque.

== Music video ==
On 25 April 2018 the band send out a tweet that simply said "Lie To Me video." which lead a lot of fans to believe that a music video for the song would soon be released. However, the video wasn't released until 19 January 2019.

The video was directed by Brendan Vaughan and depicts lead singer Luke Hemmings singing the song while sitting in and on a car in the middle of a racetrack. The other band members are seen sitting on the bleachers, watching as two other cars circle, and eventually crash into, the car Hemmings is sitting in. The video ends with shots of the band performing the song together and the car exploding.

Drummer Ashton Irwin explained the symbolism of the video, saying "The lie to me Video represents to me when someone closest to you is in a toxic situation, and they take an emotional beating over and over. With no attempt to escape. It’s absolutely heartbreaking. All you can do is watch."

== Track listings ==
Digital download (duet version)
No.	Title	Length
1.	"Lie to Me" (featuring Julia Michaels)	2:29

Digital download (acoustic version)
No.	Title	Length
1.	"Lie to Me" (acoustic)	2:35

== Charts ==
=== Weekly charts ===
Chart (2018–19)	Peak position
Australia (ARIA)	38
Hungary (Rádiós Top 40)	23
Ireland (IRMA)	42
Lithuania (AGATA)	33
Malaysia (RIM)	16
Netherlands (Dutch Top 40 Tiparade)	14
New Zealand Heatseekers (RMNZ)	6
Portugal (AFP)	87
Romania (Airplay 100)	69
Singapore (RIAS)	20
Slovakia (Singles Digitál Top 100)	75
UK Singles (OCC)	99

=== Year-end charts ===
Chart (2019)	Position
Australian Artist (ARIA)	30
Hungary (Rádiós Top 40)	75

== Certifications ==
Region	Certification	Certified units/sales
Australia (ARIA)	3× Platinum	210,000^{‡}
Brazil (Pro-Música Brasil)	Platinum	40,000^{‡}
Canada (Music Canada)	Gold	40,000^{‡}
New Zealand (RMNZ)	Platinum	30,000^{‡}
Poland (ZPAV)	Gold	10,000^{‡}
Portugal (AFP)	Gold	5,000^{‡}
United Kingdom (BPI)	Silver	200,000^{‡}
^{‡} Sales+streaming figures based on certification alone.

== Release history ==
Region	Date	Format	Version	Label	Ref.
Various	15 June 2018	Digital download; streaming	Album	Capitol	
Various	21 December 2018	Digital download; streaming	Duet version	Capitol	
Italy	1 February 2019	Contemporary hit radio	Duet version	Universal	
Various	1 February 2019	Digital download; streaming	Acoustic Single	Capitol	
