= Anxiety (Julia Michaels song) =

Single by Julia Michaels featuring Selena Gomez

from the EP Inner Monologue Part 1
- Released: January 24, 2019
- Recorded: 2018
- Genre: Pop
- Length: 3:30
- Label: Republic
- Songwriters: Julia Michaels; Scott Harris; Selena Gomez; Ian Kirkpatrick
- Producer: Ian Kirkpatrick

Julia Michaels singles chronology
"Lie to Me" (2018)	"Anxiety" (2019)	"Peer Pressure" (2019)

Selena Gomez singles chronology
"Taki Taki" (2018)	"Anxiety" (2019)	"I Can't Get Enough" (2019)

Audio video
- "Julia Michaels - Anxiety (Audio) ft. Selena Gomez" on YouTube

"Anxiety" is a song by American singer and songwriter Julia Michaels featuring guest vocals from American singer Selena Gomez, from her fourth EP, Inner Monologue Part 1 (2019). The song was written by Michaels, Gomez, Scott Harris, and its producer Ian Kirkpatrick. It was released as the EP's lead single, and was promoted to Australian radio, where it became the most-added song the week after its release.

== Background and composition ==
In an interview with Zane Lowe, Michaels said "I was like, 'I think it'd be really awesome to have a song with two women on it that struggle with the same thing, that are talking about something other than two women fighting for a guy's attention, or something like that. It's almost like a female empowerment song without it being a female empowerment song". Upon its release, Gomez said on Instagram: "This song is really close to my heart as I've experienced anxiety and I know a lot of my friends do too."

"Anxiety" lyrically chronicles struggles with mental health. Musically, it is composed of "snaps and a razor-sharp guitar", as well as "an upbeat acoustic lick and earworm of a melody". Gomez and Michaels "trade cleverly arranged verses about the often-isolating experience of anxiety and depression".

== Critical reception ==
Paul Fletcher from iHeart Radio said "The track is centered around a plucky acoustic guitar part that settles into a slick pop groove. Both Michaels and Gomez offer endearingly frank verses about grappling with depression and social anxiety, though their lyrics are also tinged with a bit of self-deprecating humor." Ashley Iasimone, writing for Billboard, called the single "poignant".

== Charts ==
Chart (2019)	Peak position
Australia (ARIA)	67
Canada Hot 100 (Billboard)	69
Ireland (IRMA)	79
Lithuania (AGATA)	91
New Zealand Hot Singles (RMNZ)	8
Swedish Heatseeker (Sverigetopplistan)	10
US Digital Song Sales (Billboard)	28

== Certifications ==
Region	Certification	Certified units/sales
Brazil (Pro-Música Brasil)	Gold	20,000^{‡}
Canada (Music Canada)	Gold	40,000^{‡}
^{‡} Sales+streaming figures based on certification alone.

== Release history ==
Country	Date	Format	Label	Ref.
Various	January 24, 2019	Digital download; streaming	Republic	
Australia	January 24, 2019	Contemporary hit radio	Republic	
