= Worst in Me =

Single by Julia Michaels

from the EP Nervous System
- Released: September 18, 2017
- Recorded: April – May 2017
- Studio: Wolf Cousins Studios (Stockholm, Sweden); Conway Studios (Los Angeles, California)
- Genre: Pop; tropical house
- Length: 3:27
- Label: Republic
- Songwriters: Julia Michaels; Mattias Larsson; Robin Fredriksson; Justin Tranter
- Producer: Mattman & Robin

Julia Michaels singles chronology
"Uh Huh" (2017)	"Worst in Me" (2017)	"I Miss You" (2017)

Audio video
- "Worst In Me" on YouTube

"Worst in Me" is a song recorded by American singer and songwriter Julia Michaels from her third extended play Nervous System (2017), served as the third track of the EP. The song was written by Michaels, Justin Tranter and its producers Mattias Larsson and Robin Fredriksson, who composed the duo Mattman & Robin. The song was released by Republic Records to impact Hot AC radio as the third single from Nervous System on September 18, 2017. "Worst in Me" is a midtempo piano-driven pop song with tropical house elements. The song explores Michael's feelings for a former romantic partner in the light of their collapsed relationship. Michaels mentioned the song as one of her favorites.

Michaels performed the song on James Corden's Late Late Show and again on The Tonight Show with Jimmy Fallon. The song became a top 30 hit on two US charts: the Adult Contemporary chart and the Adult Top 40, although it failed to enter the Billboard Hot 100.

== Background and recording ==
"Worst in Me" was written somewhere between April and May 2017 by Julia Michaels, Justin Tranter, Robin Fredriksson and Mattias Larsson. The song was produced by the production duo Mattman & Robin and they played bass, clapping, drums, percussion, piano and synthesizer and they handled the programming. The song was mixed by Mike "Spike" Stent at Mixsuite UK/LA and strings were recorded, arranged, played and edited by Mattias Bylund at Studio Willow-Valley, located at Goteborg, Sweden. Jungen B. Linderholm played cello and Mattias Johansson played violin. Background vocals were sung by Michaels.

== Composition and lyrical interpretation ==
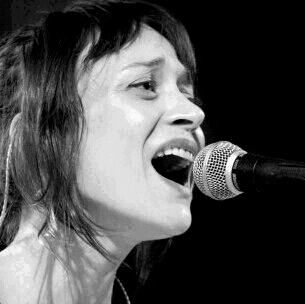
Pitchfork critic Katherine St. Asap compared the song's lyrical content to that of "Fast as You Can," performed by American singer-songwriter Fiona Apple (above)

The song's lyrics discuss a troubled relationship; Variety opined that the relationship described in the song is similar to the one in "Issues," but that in "Worst in Me," Michaels is "less hopeful about how it'll turn out." In a review of the single's parent EP, Pitchfork's Katherine St. Asaph commented that the song, along with "Issues," "might as well be SongMeanings explanations of (Fiona Apple's) 'Fast as You Can.'" Rolling Stone described the song as "wistful." Idolator described the song as "emo-sounding."

== Critical reception ==
In her EP review for Pitchfork, St. Asaph regarded the song as one of the EP's weaker tracks, opining that it "leans a bit too much into the accept-me-at-my-worst confessional that’s become (fairly or not) singer-songwriter cliche: tell rather than show."

== Chart performance ==
Although "Worst in Me" failed to enter the Billboard Hot 100, the song became Michaels' second-highest peaking entry on two Billboard charts. On the Adult Top 40, the song debuted on the chart dated October 28, 2017, at number 39. In its fifth week on the chart, on the chart dated November 25, 2017, the song achieved a peak of number 29. The song also peaked within the top 30 on the Billboard Adult Contemporary singles chart, where it debuted and peaked at number 30 on the chart dated October 7, 2017.

== Live performances ==
Julia Michaels performed the song on The Tonight Show with Jimmy Fallon on Monday, October 23, 2017. Previously, in July 2017, she had performed the song on James Corden's Late Late Show.

== Credits and personnel ==
Recording and management

- Recorded at Wolf Cousins Studios (Stockholm, Sweden) and Conway Studios (Los Angeles, California)
- Strings Recorded and Edited at Studio Borgen (Partille, Sweden)
- Mastered at Sterling Sound (New York City)
- Thanks for the Songs Richard (BMI) All Rights on behalf of Itself and Thanks for the Songs Richard Administered by Warner-Tamerlane Publishing Corp., Wolf Cousins (STIM)/Warner Chappell Music Scandinavia (STIM), Justin's School for Girls (BMI) Warner-Tamerlane Publishing Corp (BMI)

Personnel

- Julia Michaels – vocals, songwriting, background vocals
- Justin Tranter – songwriting
- Mattias Larsson – songwriting; production for Wolf Cousins Productions, programming, drums, percussion, bass, piano, synths, claps (as part of Mattman & Robin)
- Robin Fredriksson – songwriting; production for Wolf Cousins Productions, programming, drums, percussion, bass, piano, synths, claps (as part of Mattman & Robin)
- Jon Sher – engineering
- Mark "Spike" Stent – mixing
- Mattias Bylund – strings recording, strings editing, string arrangement, strings
- Mattias Johansson – violin
- Jungen B. Linderholm – cello
- Randy Merrill – mastering

Credits adapted from Nervous System liner notes.

== Charts ==
Chart (2017)	Peak position
New Zealand Heatseekers (RMNZ)	8
US Adult Contemporary (Billboard)	30
US Adult Pop Airplay (Billboard)	29

== Certifications ==
Region	Certification	Certified units/sales
Canada (Music Canada)	Gold	40,000^{‡}
^{‡} Sales+streaming figures based on certification alone.
