= I Miss You (Clean Bandit song) =

Single by Clean Bandit featuring Julia Michaels

from the album What Is Love?
- Released: 27 October 2017
- Studio: Club Ralph (London, England); Westlake Recording Studios (Los Angeles, California)
- Length: 3:25
- Label: Atlantic
- Songwriters: Julia Michaels; Jack Patterson; Grace Chatto
- Producers: Jack Patterson; Mark Ralph; Grace Chatto

Clean Bandit singles chronology
"Disconnect" (2017)	"I Miss You" (2017)	"Solo" (2018)

Julia Michaels singles chronology
"Worst in Me" (2017)	"I Miss You" (2017)	"Hurt Somebody" (2018)

Music video
- "I Miss You" on YouTube

"I Miss You" is a song by British electronic music group Clean Bandit, featuring vocals from American singer and songwriter Julia Michaels. It was written by Michaels, Jack Patterson and Grace Chatto, with production handled by the latter two and Mark Ralph. The song was released to digital retailers on 27 October 2017, as the third single from Clean Bandit's second studio album, What Is Love? (2018).

== Background ==
On 16 October 2017, Clean Bandit first announced the song and its release date on social media, along with the single cover and a pre-order set up on streaming services. Shortly afterwards, Michaels revealed on Twitter that she "wrote ['I Miss You'] at the height of an emotional roller coaster. When I was stuck at the top, this flew out of me." The group posted the first snippet of the song on social media two days later, in which Michaels' layered voice can be heard "singing the melody over a piano piece".

Michaels later confirmed via a tweet that she wrote the song while Jack Patterson was playing the piano. Chatto spoke to Billboard on the meaning behind the track, saying: "It's a simple song, about the unbelievable pain of breaking up with someone you love." She also regarded Justin Bieber's 2015 single "Sorry", a highly successful song co-written by Michaels, as one of her favourites of all time, calling working with Michaels "a real honour".

== Critical reception ==
Allison Stubblebine of Billboard described the song as "packed with the bright symphonic elements synonymous with any Clean Bandit project". Mike Wass of Idolator called it "a sublime banger that packs an emotional punch", praising Clean Bandit for providing "faultless, intricate, multi-layered production", as well as "introducing some Asian sounds into the mix without it sounding forced or gimmicky".

== Music video ==
The self-directed music video, filmed at the Epping Ongar Railway and the locations on the South Coast in the United Kingdom and a desert in Los Angeles, sees the ensemble, all dressed in red, dancing around, intercut with landscape shots. Chatto described the filming process as "very special". She added: "We got to know each other better in the blazing heat, we experimented with special effects and train tracks." Jack Patterson said that he was "desperately trying to finish [the music video] in time to go on tour".

== Credits and personnel ==
Recording and management

- Recorded at Club Ralph (London, England) and Westlake Recording Studios (Los Angeles, California)
- Mixed at Club Ralph (London, United Kingdom)
- Mastered at Metropolis Mastering (London, United Kingdom)
- Published by EMI Music Publishing Ltd and Warner-Tamerlane Publishing Corp. (BMI)/Thanks for the Songs Richard (BMI) administered by Warner-Tamerlane Publishing Corp

Personnel

- Julia Michaels – vocals, songwriting
- Jack Patterson – songwriting, production, mixing, piano, synthesisers
- Grace Chatto – songwriting, production, mixing, cello
- Mark Ralph – production, mixing
- Keith Gretlein – engineering, vocal engineering
- Drew Smith – engineering
- Tom AD Fuller – engineering
- Rob Cohen – vocal engineering
- Luke Patterson – percussion
- Stuart Hawkes – mastering

Credits adapted from What Is Love? liner notes.

== Charts ==
=== Weekly charts ===
Chart (2017–18)	Peak position
Australia (ARIA)	20
Australia Dance (ARIA)	2
Austria (Ö3 Austria Top 40)	57
Belgium (Ultratop 50 Flanders)	5
Belgium Dance (Ultratop Flanders)	5
Belgium (Ultratop 50 Wallonia)	5
Belgium Dance (Ultratop Wallonia)	3
Canada Hot 100 (Billboard)	50
Colombia Airplay (National-Report)	54
Croatia International Airplay (Top lista)	1
Czech Republic Airplay (ČNS IFPI)	96
Czech Republic Singles Digital (ČNS IFPI)	22
Denmark (Tracklisten)	14
France (SNEP)	72
Germany (GfK)	49
Greece International (IFPI)	39
Hungary (Rádiós Top 40)	23
Hungary (Stream Top 40)	15
Ireland (IRMA)	3
Israel International Airplay (Media Forest)	1
Italy (FIMI)	75
Latvia Streaming (DigiTop100)	23
Mexico Airplay (Billboard)	14
Netherlands (Dutch Top 40)	17
Netherlands (Mega Top 50)	39
Netherlands (Single Top 100)	10
Netherlands (Dutch Dance Top 30)	1
New Zealand (Recorded Music NZ)	17
Norway (VG-lista)	18
Philippines (Philippine Hot 100)	93
Portugal (AFP)	32
Scotland Singles (Official Charts)	8
Slovakia Airplay (ČNS IFPI)	83
Slovakia Singles Digital (ČNS IFPI)	21
Slovenia Airplay (SloTop50)	44
Spain (Promusicae)	50
Sweden (Sverigetopplistan)	34
Switzerland (Schweizer Hitparade)	43
UK Singles (Official Charts)	4
US Billboard Hot 100	92
US Adult Pop Airplay (Billboard)	27
US Dance Club Songs (Billboard)	39
US Hot Dance/Electronic Songs (Billboard)	6
US Pop Airplay (Billboard)	29

=== Year-end charts ===
Chart (2017)	Position
Hungary (Stream Top 40)	98

Chart (2018)	Position
Australia (ARIA)	63
Belgium (Ultratop Flanders)	32
Belgium (Ultratop Wallonia)	48
Denmark (Tracklisten)	58
France (SNEP)	142
Hungary (Rádiós Top 40)	80
Ireland (IRMA)	37
Netherlands (Single Top 100)	59
Portugal (AFP)	90
UK Singles (Official Charts Company)	48
US Hot Dance/Electronic Songs (Billboard)	15

== Certifications ==
Region	Certification	Certified units/sales
Australia (ARIA)	3× Platinum	210,000^{‡}
Austria (IFPI Austria)	Gold	15,000^{‡}
Belgium (BRMA)	Platinum	20,000^{‡}
Canada (Music Canada)	2× Platinum	160,000^{‡}
Denmark (IFPI Danmark)	Platinum	90,000^{‡}
France (SNEP)	Platinum	200,000^{‡}
Germany (BVMI)	Gold	200,000^{‡}
Italy (FIMI)	Platinum	50,000^{‡}
New Zealand (RMNZ)	3× Platinum	90,000^{‡}
Poland (ZPAV)	Platinum	50,000^{‡}
Portugal (AFP)	Platinum	10,000^{‡}
Spain (Promusicae)	Gold	30,000^{‡}
United Kingdom (BPI)	2× Platinum	1,200,000^{‡}
United States (RIAA)	Gold	500,000^{‡}
^{‡} Sales+streaming figures based on certification alone.

== Release history ==
Region	Date	Format	Version	Label	Ref.
Italy	October 26, 2017	Contemporary hit radio	Original	Warner	
Worldwide	October 27, 2017	Digital download	Original	Atlantic; Warner	
Various	October 27, 2017	Digital download	Naations Remix	Atlantic; Warner	
United States	November 7, 2017	Contemporary hit radio	Original	Atlantic	
United Kingdom	November 17, 2017	Contemporary hit radio	Original	Atlantic	
Various	November 17, 2017	Digital download	Cahill Remix	Atlantic; Warner	
Various	November 17, 2017	Digital download	Matoma Remix	Atlantic; Warner	
Various	December 8, 2017	Digital download	Acoustic	Atlantic; Warner	
Various	December 15, 2017	Digital download	Tokio Myers Remix	Atlantic; Warner	
Various	January 5, 2018	Digital download	Yungen Remix	Atlantic; Warner	
Various	February 16, 2018	Digital download	Remixes EP	Atlantic; Warner	
