= What a Time =

Single by Julia Michaels featuring Niall Horan

from the EP Inner Monologue Part 1
- Released: March 29, 2019
- Recorded: 2018
- Genre: Pop
- Length: 2:53
- Label: Republic
- Songwriters: Julia Michaels; Justin Tranter; Casey Barth; Riley Knapp
- Producers: Kirkpatrick; RKCB

Julia Michaels singles chronology
"Peer Pressure" (2019)	"What a Time" (2019)	"Okay" (2019)

Niall Horan singles chronology
"Seeing Blind" (2018)	"What a Time" (2019)	"Nice to Meet Ya" (2019)

Music video
- "What a Time" on YouTube

"What a Time" is a song by American singer and songwriter Julia Michaels featuring Irish singer-songwriter Niall Horan, from her fourth EP, Inner Monologue Part 1 (2019). The song was written by Michaels, Justin Tranter, Casey Barth, and Riley Knapp, and produced by Ian Kirkpatrick and RKCB. It was sent to Australian radio on March 29, 2019, as the lead single from the EP and was the second most added song days after its release. It was nominated at the Teen Choice Awards 2019 for Choice Collaboration.

== Composition ==
"What a Time" has been described as a slow pop song. Lyrically, "What a Time" has been referred to as "mourn[ing] the end of a relationship". The chorus, which contains the lyrics "I think of that night in the park, it was getting dark / And we stayed up for hours / What a time, what a time, what a time," has been described by MTV as "powerful".

== Live performances ==
On February 18, 2019, Michaels and Horan performed the song for the first time on The Late Late Show with James Corden. On January 15, 2020, Michaels performed a solo version of the song at the House of Blues Chicago on the Honda Stage.

== Music video ==
The music video was released on February 7, 2019, and was directed by Boni Mata. The video features the singer and a look-alike of Horan in a flower-strewn apartment where the two reminisce about past relationships. An acoustic video was released on March 28, 2019.

== Accolades ==
Awards
Year	Organization	Award	Recipient	Result	Ref.
2019	Teen Choice Awards	Choice Collaboration	Julia Michaels	Nominated	

== Charts ==
Chart performance for "What a Time"
Chart (2019–2021)	Peak position
Australia (ARIA)	100
Canada Hot 100 (Billboard)	95
Ireland (IRMA)	26
New Zealand Hot Singles (RMNZ)	23
UK Singles (Official Charts)	71

== Certifications ==
Certifications for "What a Time"
Region	Certification	Certified units/sales
Brazil (Pro-Música Brasil)	3× Platinum	120,000^{‡}
Canada (Music Canada)	Platinum	80,000^{‡}
Denmark (IFPI Danmark)	Platinum	90,000^{‡}
New Zealand (RMNZ)	2× Platinum	60,000^{‡}
Poland (ZPAV)	Gold	25,000^{‡}
Portugal (AFP)	Gold	5,000^{‡}
Spain (Promusicae)	Gold	30,000^{‡}
United Kingdom (BPI)	Platinum	600,000^{‡}
United States (RIAA)	2× Platinum	2,000,000^{‡}
^{‡} Sales+streaming figures based on certification alone.

== Release history ==
Region	Date	Format	Label	Ref.
Australia	March 29, 2019	Contemporary hit radio	Republic	
