= Inner Monologue Part 1 =

EP by Julia Michaels
- Released: January 24, 2019
- Recorded: 2018–2019
- Genre: Pop
- Length: 18:13
- Label: Republic
- Producer: Casey Barth; Louis Bell; Frank Dukes; Ian Kirkpatrick; Riley Knapp; Benjamin Rice

Julia Michaels chronology
Nervous System (2017)	Inner Monologue Part 1 (2019)	Inner Monologue Part 2 (2019)

Singles from Inner Monologue Part 1
- 1. "Anxiety" Released: January 24, 2019; 2. "What a Time" Released: March 29, 2019

Inner Monologue Part 1 is the fourth extended play by American singer and songwriter Julia Michaels, released on January 24, 2019, through Republic Records. It follows her 2017 EP Nervous System. The EP features six songs, including collaborations with Selena Gomez and Niall Horan. Michaels went on a tour in the second quarter of 2019 in support of the EP.

== Music ==
The EP features songs with "a syncopated rhythm, a jumble of words, negative space, and [...] undeniable hooks". "Anxiety" features lyrics about mental health "over snaps and a razor-sharp guitar"; Paper magazine commented that it has "an upbeat acoustic lick and earworm of a melody" and "the dynamic duo trading cleverly arranged verses about the often-isolating experience of anxiety and depression". Upon its release, Gomez said on Instagram: "This song is really close to my heart as I've experienced anxiety and I know a lot of my friends do too."

"Into You" features "stadium echoes, booms and a strobing vibe that strikes just left of Lorde", while third track "Happy" includes Michaels "strained-voice and desperate, break[ing] out of beat to reflect on how writing lovesick songs might affect her life as a whole".

== Release ==
Michaels released the EP a day earlier than originally planned, having first announced it would be released on January 25, 2019.

== Critical reception ==
Inner Monologue Part 1 received mostly mixed to positive reviews. While many found a strong interest and strength in the opening single “Anxiety”, others found weakness in some other tracks. Mike Nied of Idolator commented that the EP "offers another glimpse into the songwriter-turned-superstar's inner workings" and that it is "bookended by a pair of must-hear duets". Nied stated that "What a Time" "mourns the end of a relationship", and Billboard called "Anxiety" "poignant".

== Promotion ==
The EP was promoted with the release of four music videos; "What a Time" on February 7, "Happy" on February 28 "Deep" on March 6 and "Apple" on March 13.

Michaels embarked on the Inner Monologue Tour in 2019. This is her first headlining tour. The tour started on March 4, 2019, at the House of Blues at Disney Springs in Orlando, FL.

== Track listing ==
Credits adapted from Tidal.

No.	Title	Writer(s)	Producer(s)	Length
1.	"Anxiety" (featuring Selena Gomez)	Julia Michaels; Scott Harris; Selena Gomez; Ian Kirkpatrick	Kirkpatrick	3:30
2.	"Into You"	Michaels; Adam Feeney; Louis Bell	Bell; Frank Dukes	3:12
3.	"Happy"	Michaels; Justin Tranter; Casey Barth; Riley Knapp	Kirkpatrick; RKCB	3:11
4.	"Deep"	Michaels	Kirkpatrick; Benjamin Rice^{[p]}	2:43
5.	"Apple"	Michaels	Kirkpatrick; Rice^{[p]}	2:44
6.	"What a Time" (featuring Niall Horan)	Michaels; Tranter; Barth; Knapp	Kirkpatrick; RKCB	2:53
Total length:				18:13

Note

- ^{^[p]} signifies a primary and vocal producer.

== Personnel ==
Musicians

- Julia Michaels – vocals (all tracks), ukulele (track 5)
- Ian Kirkpatrick – guitar (tracks 1, 2), keyboards (1, 4, 5), programming (1, 4), background vocals (1)
- Juan Ariza – guitar, piano (tracks 2, 6)
- Frank Dukes – guitar, programming (track 2)
- Louis Bell – guitar, programming (track 2)
- Casey Barth – background vocals, bass guitar, strings (tracks 3, 6)
- Riley Knapp – background vocals, guitar (tracks 3, 6)
- Benjamin Rice – programming (track 4)

Technical

- Ryan Smith – mastering
- Mark "Spike" Stent – mixing (tracks 1, 3–6)
- Manny Marroquin – mixing (track 2)
- Michael Freeman – mixing assistance (tracks 3, 5)
- Matt Tuggle – engineering assistance (tracks 4–6)

== Charts ==
Chart (2019)	Peak position
Australian Albums (ARIA)	43
Belgian Albums (Ultratop Flanders)	106
Belgian Albums (Ultratop Wallonia)	172
Canadian Albums (Billboard)	45
Swedish Albums (Sverigetopplistan)	39
US Billboard 200	99
US Digital Albums (Billboard)	17
US Top Album Sales (Billboard)	63
