= Jump (Julia Michaels song) =

Single by Julia Michaels featuring Trippie Redd
- Released: May 4, 2018
- Length: 3:27
- Label: Republic
- Songwriter(s): Justin Tranter; Michael Lamar White IV; Julia Michaels; Nick Monson
- Producer(s): Nick Monson

Julia Michaels singles chronology
"Coming Home" (2018)	"Jump" (2018)	"Light Me Up" (2018)

Music video
- "Julia Michaels, Trippie Redd - Jump" on YouTube

"Jump" is a song by American singer Julia Michaels featuring fellow American singer and rapper Trippie Redd. The song was released on May 4, 2018.

== Music video ==
The music video was released on June 7, 2018.

== Charts ==
=== Weekly charts ===
Chart (2018)	Peak position
New Zealand Heatseekers (RMNZ)	7
Romania (Airplay 100)	17
Swedish Heatseeker (Sverigetopplistan)	17

=== Year-end charts ===
Chart (2018)	Position
Romania (Airplay 100)	85

== Certifications ==
Region	Certification	Certified units/sales
Australia (ARIA)	Gold	35,000^{‡}
Brazil (Pro-Música Brasil)	Gold	20,000^{‡}
Canada (Music Canada)	Gold	40,000^{‡}
^{‡} Sales+streaming figures based on certification alone.
