= Uh Huh (Julia Michaels song) =

Single by Julia Michaels

from the EP Nervous System
- Released: June 2, 2017
- Recorded: April 2017
- Studio: Wolf Cousins Studios (Stockholm, Sweden); MXM Studios (Los Angeles, California)
- Genre: Pop
- Length: 2:57
- Label: Republic; Universal
- Songwriters: Julia Michaels; Mattias Larsson; Robin Fredriksson; Justin Tranter
- Producer: Mattman & Robin

Julia Michaels singles chronology
"Issues" (2017)	"Uh Huh" (2017)	"Worst in Me" (2017)

Music video
- "Uh Huh" on YouTube

"Uh Huh" is a song recorded by American singer and songwriter Julia Michaels from her third extended play Nervous System (2017), and served as the second track of the EP. The song was written by Michaels, Justin Tranter and producers Mattias Larsson and Robin Fredriksson, who composed the duo Mattman & Robin. The song was released by Republic Records as the second single from Nervous System on June 2, 2017. "Uh Huh" is a midtempo guitar-driven punk pop song that talks about the fight of mind and emotion. Michaels described it as "the feeling of the breath before the kiss".

It was accompanied by a music video directed by Emil Nava and premiered on her Vevo channel on July 24, 2017.

== Background and writing ==
"Uh Huh" was written in April 2017 by Julia Michaels, Justin Tranter, Robin Fredriksson and Mattias Larsson. When talking about the idea of the song, Michaels said "I really wanted to capture that initial feeling of being next to somebody that you want so bad to kiss you...and it hasn't happened yet."

== Recording and composition ==
Recording sessions for the song took place at Wolf Cousins Studios, Stockholm, Sweden and MXM Studios, Los Angeles, California and was engineered by Sam Holland and Cory Bice with assistance from Jeremy Lertola. The producers of the song, Mattman & Robin, did the programming and played drums, percussion, toms, guitar, bass, piano, synths and claps with the background vocals being provided by Michaels and Tranter. Mark "Spike" Stent mixed the track and Randy Merrill completed the audio mastering at Sterling Sound, New York City.

Musically, "Uh Huh" is a two minutes and fifty-seven second mid-tempo pop song with punk pop influences. In terms of music notation, "Uh Huh" was composed using 4/4 common time in the key of E major, with a moderate tempo of 69 beats per minute. The song follows the chord progression of E–C♯m–G♯m–A and Michaels' vocal range spans from the low note B_{3} to the high note of F♯_{5}, giving the song one octave and five notes of range.

Lyrically, the song talks about the fight of mind and emotion which Michaels has described as "the feeling of the breath before the kiss."

== Music video ==
=== Background and release ===
The official lyric video for the song was released on June 11, 2017, on Michael's YouTube and Vevo channels. The official music video was released on July 25, 2017, and it was directed by Emil Nava and produced by MaryAnn Tanedo. Michaels' love interest in the music video is Thomas Edwin. The music video was recorded in a set at Los Angeles, California.

=== Synopsis ===
It's about embracing who we are, and who we are underneath who we are.

— Michaels in Vevo's "Uh Huh" footnotes.

The music video starts with a "very personal" and "candid" conversation about breakups, life, love and family between Michaels and Edwin. Nava asked them to start the shoot like that, he said "We forced a conversation that you would never have on the first date...We made a point of really trying to scratch the surface on the first conversation." The music video has a reference to the movie Birdman, when Michaels is in one location but the colors are changing. The scene of switching clothes between suit and dress, was Michaels' idea. About that Michaels said "I think something that is really incredible, especially in this day in age, is sexuality and exploring that with each other, and feeling so comfortable with each other that you can do that."

== Critical reception ==
Mike Wass of Idolator called it "brighter, bolder and more instant" than her previous single "Issues", as well labeling the chorus as "obscenely catchy". He also claimed "it doesn't sound like anything else on radio, which is quite an achievement given that her sparse, emotional approach is being imitated by everyone from songwriting clients to random copycats." MTV's Madeline Roth said "the songwriter-to-the-stars has unleashed 'Uh Huh', a loved-up earworm that finds her crazy in lust with a special someone. This bop should have no issues creepin' onto your summertime playlist." Raisa Bruner of Time stated "the singer-songwriter behind 'Issues' now brings us second single 'Uh Huh', a more up-tempo modern pop tune with an acoustic scratchiness and unexpected vocal kick. Michaels is making her mark on the pop landscape with her ability to keep coming up with songs that sound completely different from other charting tunes."

== Credits and personnel ==
Recording and management

- Recorded at Wolf Cousins Studios (Stockholm, Sweden) and MXM Studios (Los Angeles, California)
- Mastered at Sterling Sound (New York City)
- Thanks for the Songs Richard (BMI) All Rights on behalf of Itself and Thanks for the Songs Richard Administered by Warner-Tamerlane Publishing Corp., Wolf Cousins (STIM)/Warner Chappell Music Scandinavia (STIM), Justin's School for Girls (BMI) Warner-Tamerlane Publishing Corp (BMI)

Personnel

- Julia Michaels – vocals, songwriting, background vocals
- Justin Tranter – songwriting, background vocals
- Mattias Larsson – songwriting; production for Wolf Cousins Productions, programming, drums, percussion, toms, guitar, bass, piano, synths, claps (as part of Mattman & Robin)
- Robin Fredriksson – songwriting; production for Wolf Cousins Productions, programming, drums, percussion, toms, guitar, bass, piano, synths, claps (as part of Mattman & Robin)
- Sam Holland – engineering
- Cory Bice – engineering
- Jeremy Lertola – assistant engineering
- Mark "Spike" Stent – mixing
- Randy Merrill – mastering

Credits adapted from Nervous System liner notes.

== Charts ==
Chart (2017)	Peak position
Australia (ARIA)	88
Czech Republic (Singles Digitál Top 100)	84
New Zealand Heatseekers (RMNZ)	5
Slovakia (Singles Digitál Top 100)	88
US Pop Airplay (Billboard)	38

== Certifications ==
Region	Certification	Certified units/sales
Canada (Music Canada)	Gold	40,000^{‡}
^{‡} Sales+streaming figures based on certification alone.

== Release history ==
Region	Date	Format	Label	Ref.
Worldwide	June 2, 2017	Digital download	Republic; Universal	
United States	June 27, 2017	Top 40 radio	Republic	
