= Issues (Julia Michaels song) =

Single by Julia Michaels

from the EP Nervous System
- Released: January 13, 2017
- Recorded: January 2016
- Studio: Westlake Studios (Los Angeles, California); Treehouse X Studios (Suffolk, United Kingdom)
- Genre: Pop
- Length: 2:56
- Label: Republic
- Songwriters: Julia Michaels; Benjamin Levin; Tor Erik Hermansen; Mikkel Storleer Eriksen; Justin Tranter
- Producers: Stargate; Benny Blanco

Julia Michaels singles chronology
"Carry Me" (2016)	"Issues" (2017)	"Uh Huh" (2017)

Music video
- "Issues" on YouTube

"Issues" is the debut single recorded by American singer and songwriter Julia Michaels, from her third EP, Nervous System (2017). The song was co-written with Justin Tranter, and its producers Benny Blanco and Stargate. Released by Republic Records on January 13, 2017, as the lead single from the EP, it is a confessional downtempo pop song. Lyrically, it is a raw ode to Michaels' anxiety.

The song peaked in the top 10 of the record charts in Australia, Belgium, the Czech Republic, Denmark, France, Norway, Scotland and UK. In the US, the song peaked at number 11 on the Billboard Hot 100. "Issues" is certified Platinum or higher in twelve countries including Diamond in France. The song's accompanying music video was directed by Tabitha Denholm. It depicts Michaels hosting a party with a group of friends.

The video premiered on March 7, 2017. "Issues" received a Song of the Year nomination at the 60th Annual Grammy Awards. Michaels promoted the song in a number of appearances, including live performances at The Tonight Show Starring Jimmy Fallon, the 2017 Radio Disney Music Awards, Wango Tango, the 2017 Billboard Music Awards, the 2017 iHeartRadio Much Music Video Awards, the 2017 MTV Video Music Awards and The Today Show.

== Background and composition ==
"Issues" was written by Michaels, and Justin Tranter. A few artists, who Stargate and Benny Blanco refused to name, laid claim to the song. However, Michaels refused to give the song away as it felt "too much my story to give to someone else. In 2017, a demo of the song by British singer Charli XCX was leaked and revealed that she had recorded the song before Michaels decided to keep it.

Recording sessions for "Issues" took place at Westlake Recording Studios, Los Angeles, California, and Treehouse X Studio, Suffolk, United Kingdom. It was engineered by Dave Schwerkolt and Chris Sclafani. Mark "Spike" Stent mixed the track at Mixsuite UK with assistance from Michael Freeman and Geoff Swish. Blanco and Stargate, who produced the song, also performed all the instruments and programming. Tom Coyne and Randy Merrill completed the audio mastering at Sterling Sound, New York City.

Musically, "Issues" is a confessional downtempo pop song. In terms of music notation, "Issues" was composed using 4/4 common time in the key of A♭ major, with a moderate tempo of 114 beats per minute. The song follows the chord progression of D♭-E♭-A♭/C-D♭sus2 and Michaels' vocal range spans from the low note C_{4} to the high note of E♭_{5}, giving the song one octave and two notes of range. Lyrically, Michaels has described the song as a raw ode to her own anxieties.

== Critical reception ==
The song received generally positive reviews from music critics. A writer for Billboard praised the song, writing, "with blunt, honest lyricism and razor-sharp songwriting, Michaels' decision to choose minimal production proves to be wise, helping to frame her intriguing vocals expertly in order to give fans a delicious first taste of what is yet to come". Writing for Idolator, Mike Wass stated "it can be hard for songwriters to carve out a unique voice when they step out on their own, but it doesn't look like that will be a problem for Julia".

== Music video ==
The official music video for the song, directed by Tabitha Denholm, was released on March 7, 2017. It features Michaels experiencing the unknown that every relationship goes through. It portrays the singer in a "loving" relationship which "feels like it could fall apart any moment". The male role is played by Alex Koch. The official lyric video for the song was released after the music video on May 17, 2017. It was directed by Pedro Chaves and shot in London, England. The video displays the life of several people and several backgrounds.

== Chart performance ==
"Issues" debuted at number 87 on the US Billboard Hot 100 issued for February 11, 2017. The song peaked at number 11 in its 18th week on the chart and spent 29 weeks in total. The Recording Industry Association of America (RIAA) certified it 5× Platinum, which denotes five million units based on sales and track-equivalent on-demand streams. On the Canadian Hot 100, "Issues" peaked at number 17 and was certified 6× Platinum by Music Canada.

The song reached number seven in France and was certified Diamond. In Sweden, it peaked at number 11 and was certified 4× Platinum. "Issues" was certified 3× Platinum in Norway and Australia, reaching number three in the former country and number five in the latter. In New Zealand and the United Kingdom, the song peaked at number 11 and number 10, respectively, attaining 4× Platinum certification in New Zealand and Platinum certification in the UK. It charted within the top 15 of national record charts, at number two in Belgium, number three in Denmark, number seven in Scotland, number nine in Czech Republic, number 11 in Ireland, Malaysia, Slovakia, and number 15 in the Netherlands. The song received a 2× Platinum certification in Denmark, Italy, Spain, and Platinum in Belgium, Germany.

== Live performances ==
Michaels made her late night television debut on March 20, 2017, performing "Issues" on The Tonight Show Starring Jimmy Fallon. She also performed "Issues" at the 2017 Radio Disney Music Awards on April 30, 2017, and at Wango Tango on May 13, 2017. At the 2017 Billboard Music Awards, Michaels was selected as the T-Mobile Breakthrough Artist and gave a performance of "Issues" that was regarded one of the night's best by several media outlets. Michaels also performed the song at the 2017 iHeartRadio Much Music Video Awards on June 18, 2017 and at the 2017 MTV Video Music Awards on August 27, 2017. The latter performance was cut short on TV as MTV decided to cut to a commercial break, which upset many people. The song was performed on The Today Show in August 2017.

== Track listing ==
Digital download
No.	Title	Length
1.	"Issues"	2:56

Digital download – acoustic version
No.	Title	Length
1.	"Issues" (Acoustic)	2:55

Digital download – Alan Walker remix
No.	Title	Length
1.	"Issues" (Alan Walker remix)	3:01

== Credits and personnel ==
Recording and management

- Recorded and Tracked at Westlake Studios (Los Angeles, California) and Treehouse X Studio (Suffolk, United Kingdom)
- Mixed at Mixsuite UK
- Mastered at Sterling Sound (New York City)
- Published by Please Don't Forget To Play Me Music/Administered by Universal Music Publishing (GMR), EMI Music Publishing (ASCAP), EMI Music Publishing (ASCAP), Warner-Tamerlane Publishing Corp. (BMI) Thanks for the Songs Richard (BMI) All Rights on behalf of Itself and Thanks for the Songs Richard Administered by Warner-Tamerlane Publishing Corp, Justin's School for Girls/Warner-Tamerlane Publishing Corp/All Rights Administered by Warner-Tamerlane Publishing Corp (BMI)

Personnel

- Julia Michaels – vocals, songwriting
- Benjamin Levin – songwriting, production for Matza Ball Productions, Inc., programming, instrumentation
- Tor Erik Hermansen – songwriting; production for 45th and 3rd Music, LLC, programming, instrumentation (as part of Stargate)
- Mikkel Storleer Eriksen – songwriting; production for 45th and 3rd Music, LLC, programming, instrumentation (as part of Stargate)
- Justin Tranter – songwriting
- Dave Schwerkolt – engineering
- Chris Sclafani – engineering
- Mark "Spike" Stent – mixing
- Michael Freeman – assistant engineer for mix
- Geoff Swish – assistant engineer for mix
- Tom Coyne – mastering
- Randy Merrill – mastering

Credits adapted from Nervous System liner notes.

== Charts ==
=== Weekly charts ===
Weekly chart positions for "Issues"
Chart (2017–18)	Peak position
Australia (ARIA)	5
Austria (Ö3 Austria Top 40)	36
Belgium (Ultratop 50 Flanders)	8
Belgium (Ultratop 50 Wallonia)	2
Canada Hot 100 (Billboard)	17
Canada AC (Billboard)	37
Canada CHR/Top 40 (Billboard)	15
Canada Hot AC (Billboard)	20
Czech Republic Airplay (ČNS IFPI)	9
Czech Republic Singles Digital (ČNS IFPI)	10
Denmark (Tracklisten)	3
France (SNEP)	7
Germany (GfK)	29
Hungary (Single Top 40)	38
Ireland (IRMA)	11
Italy (FIMI)	52
Lebanon (Lebanese Top 20)	19
Malaysia (RIM)	11
Netherlands (Dutch Top 40)	15
Netherlands (Single Top 100)	20
New Zealand (Recorded Music NZ)	11
Norway (VG-lista)	3
Philippines (Philippine Hot 100)	54
Poland Airplay (ZPAV)	41
Portugal (AFP)	20
Romania (Airplay 100)	4
Romania Airplay (Media Forest)	1
Scottish Singles Sales (Official Charts)	7
Slovakia Airplay (ČNS IFPI)	54
Slovakia Singles Digital (ČNS IFPI)	11
Spain (Promusicae)	48
Sweden (Sverigetopplistan)	11
Switzerland (Schweizer Hitparade)	22
UK Singles (Official Charts)	10
US Billboard Hot 100	11
US Adult Contemporary (Billboard)	17
US Adult Pop Airplay (Billboard)	7
US Pop Airplay (Billboard)	4
US Dance Airplay (Billboard)	7
US Rhythmic Airplay (Billboard)	35

=== Year-end charts ===
2017 year-end chart positions for "Issues"
Chart (2017)	Position
Australia (ARIA)	15
Belgium (Ultratop Flanders)	15
Belgium (Ultratop Wallonia)	6
Canada (Canadian Hot 100)	31
Denmark (Tracklisten)	4
France (SNEP)	45
Germany (Official German Charts)	93
Hungary (Stream Top 40)	41
Latvia Airplay (LaIPA)	73
Netherlands (Dutch Top 40)	56
Netherlands (Single Top 100)	34
New Zealand (Recorded Music NZ)	34
Romania (Airplay 100)	12
Spain (PROMUSICAE)	61
Sweden (Sverigetopplistan)	20
Switzerland (Schweizer Hitparade)	31
UK Singles (Official Charts Company)	35
US Billboard Hot 100	29
US Adult Top 40 (Billboard)	25
US Dance/Mix Show Airplay (Billboard)	43
US Mainstream Top 40 (Billboard)	19

2018 year-end chart position for "Issues"
Chart (2018)	Position
Romania (Airplay 100)	76

=== Decade-end chart ===
Decade-end chart position for "Issues"
Chart (2010–2019)	Position
Norway (VG-lista)	16

== Certifications ==
Certifications for "Issues"
Region	Certification	Certified units/sales
Australia (ARIA)	3× Platinum	210,000^{‡}
Belgium (BRMA)	Platinum	20,000^{‡}
Brazil (Pro-Música Brasil)	2× Platinum	120,000^{‡}
Canada (Music Canada)	6× Platinum	480,000^{‡}
Denmark (IFPI Danmark)	3× Platinum	270,000^{‡}
France (SNEP)	Diamond	233,333^{‡}
Germany (BVMI)	Platinum	400,000^{‡}
Italy (FIMI)	2× Platinum	100,000^{‡}
New Zealand (RMNZ)	4× Platinum	120,000^{‡}
Norway (IFPI Norway)	3× Platinum	180,000^{‡}
Poland (ZPAV)	3× Platinum	150,000^{‡}
Portugal (AFP)	2× Platinum	20,000^{‡}
Spain (Promusicae)	2× Platinum	80,000^{‡}
United Kingdom (BPI)	2× Platinum	1,200,000^{‡}
United States (RIAA)	5× Platinum	5,000,000^{‡}
Streaming
Sweden (GLF)	4× Platinum	32,000,000^{†}
^{‡} Sales+streaming figures based on certification alone.^{†} Streaming-only figures based on certification alone.

== Release history ==
Release dates and format(s) for "Issues"
Region	Date	Format	Version	Label	Ref.
Worldwide	January 13, 2017	Digital download	Original	Republic	
United States	February 6, 2017	Hot adult contemporary	Original	Republic	
United States	February 7, 2017	Contemporary hit radio	Original	Republic	
United Kingdom	March 10, 2017	Contemporary hit radio	Original	Republic	
Worldwide	March 24, 2017	Digital download	Acoustic Version	Republic	
Italy	April 18, 2017	Contemporary hit radio	Original	Universal	
Worldwide	May 5, 2017	Digital download	Alan Walker remix	Republic	
