= Julia Michaels =

American singer and songwriter (born 1993)

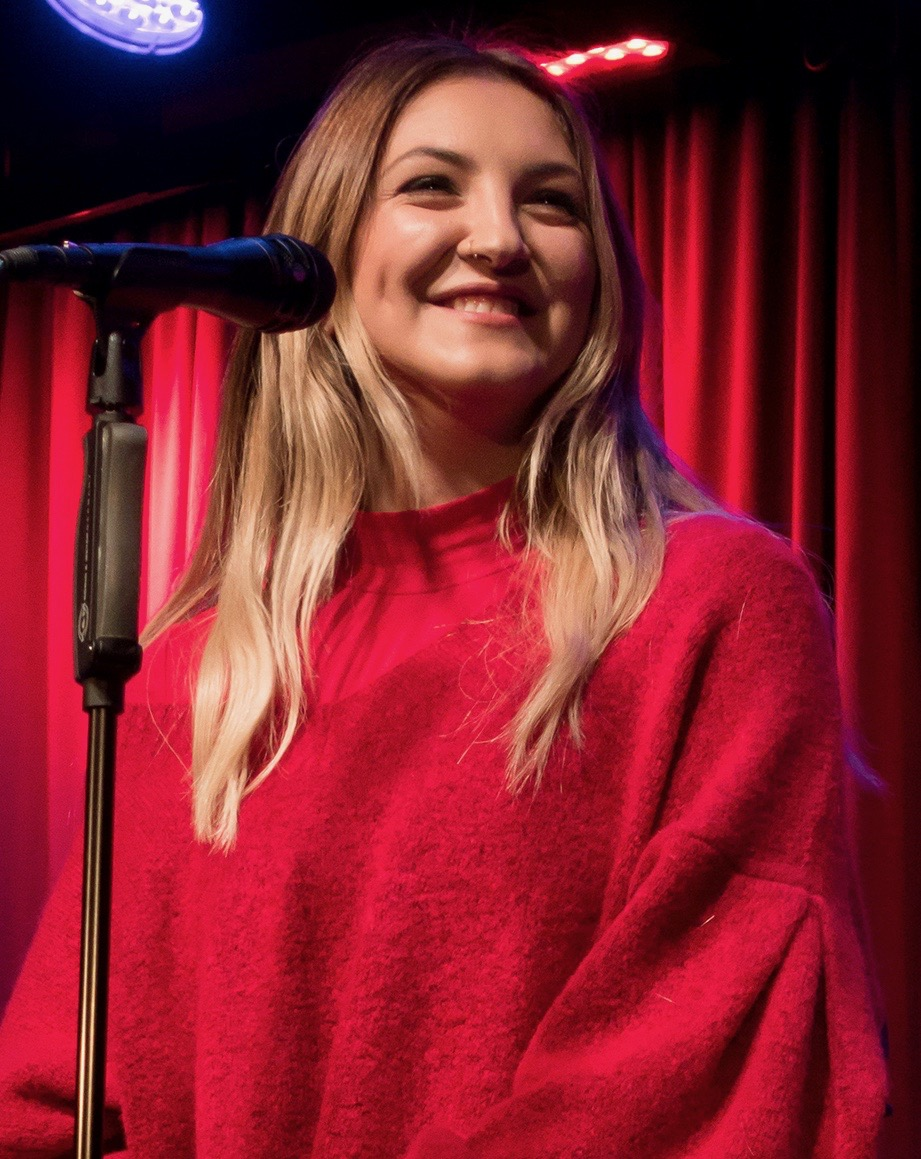
- Michaels in 2017

Background information
- Born: Julia Carin Cavazos; November 13, 1993 (age 33); Davenport, Iowa, U.S.
- Origin: Santa Clarita, California, U.S.
- Genres: Pop; EDM
- Occupations: Singer; songwriter
- Instruments: Vocals; ukulele; piano
- Works: Discography; songs written
- Years active: 2010–present
- Labels: Republic; GFY
- Spouse: Mat Rule (m. 2026)

Logo

Signature
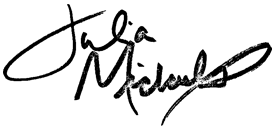

Julia Carin Michaels (née Cavazos; born November 13, 1993) is an American singer and songwriter. She has received six Grammy Award nominations, including twice for Song of the Year and Best New Artist, as well as nominations from the MTV Video Music Awards, Billboard Music Awards, and American Music Awards.

Born in Iowa and raised in California, Michaels began her career writing for other artists at the age of 16. Following her success from doing so, she signed to Republic Records as a recording artist to release her 2017 debut single, "Issues". The song peaked at number 11 on the Billboard Hot 100, received quintuple platinum certification by the Recording Industry Association of America (RIAA), and preceded her third extended play (EP), Nervous System (2017). The EP and its follow-up, Inner Monologue Part 1 (2019), both moderately entered the Billboard 200. Her debut studio album, Not in Chronological Order (2021), was met with critical praise despite commercial failure.

In her songwriting career, Michaels has been credited on songs for Selena Gomez, Olivia Rodrigo, Demi Lovato, Ed Sheeran, Fifth Harmony, Shawn Mendes, Britney Spears, Justin Bieber, Gwen Stefani, Sabrina Carpenter, and Tate McRae, among others. She has co-written two Billboard Hot 100-number one songs: Bieber's "Sorry" and Gomez's "Lose You to Love Me". As a guest performer, she appeared on the singles "If the World Was Ending" by JP Saxe, "I Miss You" by Clean Bandit, and "Coming Home" by Keith Urban. In 2023, she wrote songs for Disney's centennial animated film, Wish.

== Early life ==
Julia Michaels was born in Davenport, Iowa, but moved to Santa Clarita, California, about 35 miles northwest of Los Angeles, with her family including her older sister Jaden, who is also a songwriter. Her father is of Mexican and Puerto Rican descent. He changed his name from Juan Manuel Cavazos to John Michaels to pursue an acting career. Michaels began singing at age 12. When she was 14, she met songwriter Joleen Belle, with whom she wrote the theme song to Austin & Ally and many other songs for TV and film. At 19, she met Lindy Robbins, with whom she wrote "Fire Starter" for Demi Lovato and "Miss Movin' On" for Fifth Harmony.

Michaels has said her inspirations include Fiona Apple, Lisa Mitchell, Laura Marling, Missy Higgins, Paramore, Juliet Simms, Sarah Blasko, and The Fray. Michaels had been writing in the Hollywood Pop Circuits since she was 16. By the age of 20, she met her songwriting partner Justin Tranter—with whom she frequently collaborates— and co-wrote songs for mainstream artists including Justin Bieber, Selena Gomez, and R5. Together with the Norwegian musician Kygo she performed "Carry Me" at the closing ceremony of the 2016 Summer Olympics in Rio de Janeiro, Brazil.

== Career ==
At the age of 17, Michaels' first professional job was to write the theme song for the Disney Channel show Austin & Ally in 2010. While doing demos in 2012, she took on another job by Disney as background vocals for the song "Let It Go" from the movie Frozen.

In January 2017, Michaels released her first solo single, "Issues". According to Michaels, many big-name artists fought for the song, but she kept it for herself. She said, "It was the first time I'd written a song that sounded so much like myself that I couldn't picture anyone else singing it." In April 2017, her new song "How Do We Get Back to Love" was premiered on the HBO series Girls. Michaels's EP Nervous System was released on July 28, 2017. Her second single "Uh Huh" was released on June 2, 2017. From November 25 to December 6, 2017, Michaels was the opening act for Shawn Mendes's Illuminate World Tour on the Oceania Leg.

At the 2018 Grammy Awards, she was nominated for two awards, Best New Artist and Song of the Year for "Issues". On February 8, 2018, "Heaven" was released which was included in the soundtrack for the film Fifty Shades Freed. On May 4, 2018, "Jump" was released featuring Trippie Redd. From March 12 to May 12, 2018, Julia was the opening act for the European dates of Niall Horan's Flicker World Tour.

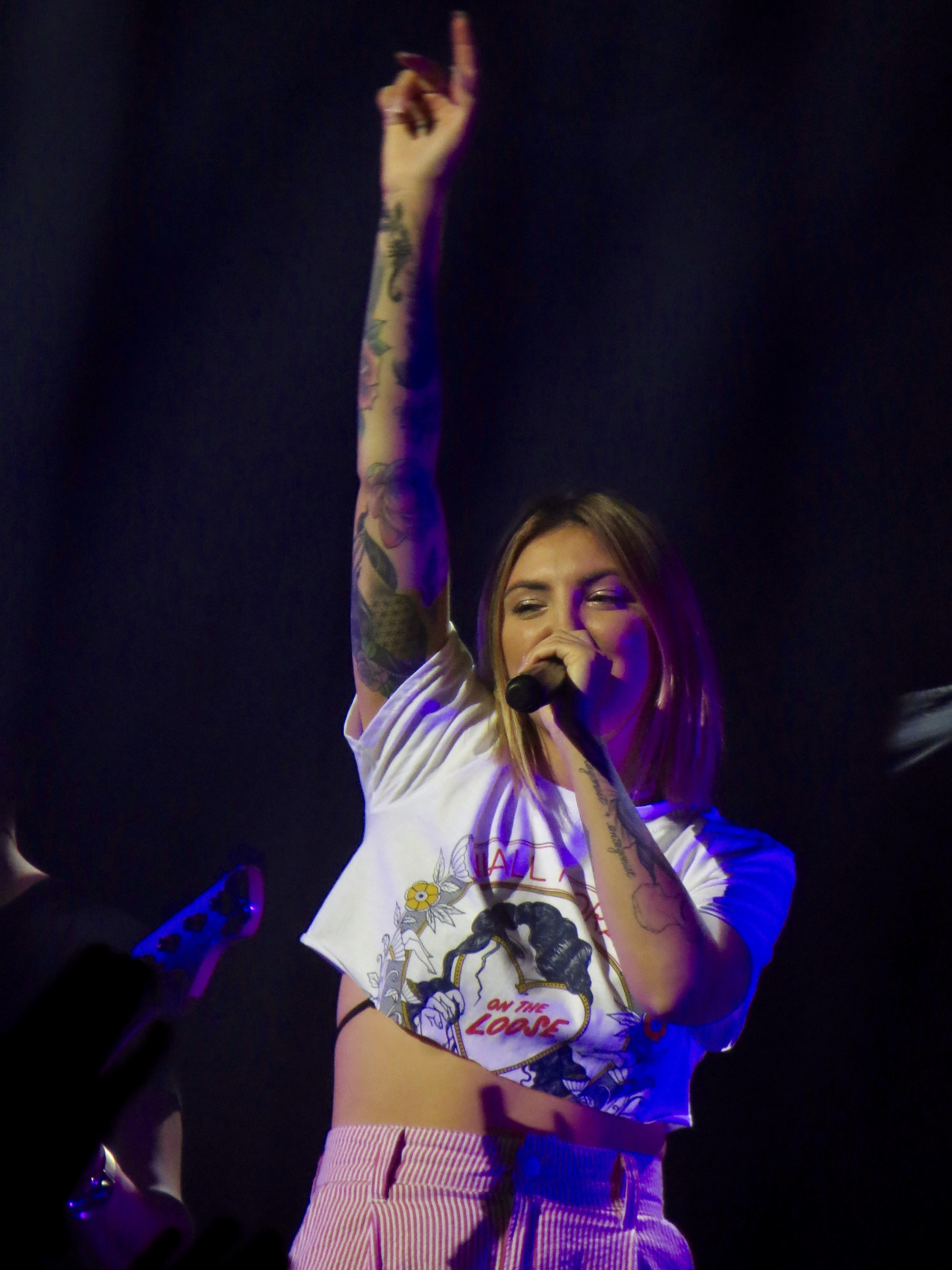
Michaels performing in 2018

From May 30 to October 15, 2018, Michaels was the opening act for Maroon 5's Red Pill Blues Tour on the North American leg. She collaborated with Lauv on the single "There's No Way", released September 27, 2018. In November 2018, she appeared on the soundtrack to the Disney film Ralph Breaks the Internet, where she performed "In This Place", a pop rendition of the film's musical number "A Place Called Slaughter Race."

On December 21, 2018, Michaels was featured on 5 Seconds of Summer's song, "Lie to Me". "Lie to Me" charted in multiple countries and was later certified platinum in Australia and Gold in Canada.

From January 23 to February 5, 2019, Michaels opened for Keith Urban on the Australian leg of his Graffiti U World Tour. On January 24, 2019, Michaels released her EP, Inner Monologue Part 1. In June 2019, she began teasing songs from Inner Monologue Part 2, including "17" and "Falling for Boys".

On May 11, 2020, Michaels appeared in the second-season episode of Songland and released the song "Give It to You".

On October 1, 2020, Michaels released the song "Lie Like This" as the lead single from her forthcoming debut studio album. On March 26, 2021, "All Your Exes" was released. On April 14, Michaels announced the title of her album, Not in Chronological Order, and its release date of April 30, 2021.

In 2023, she co-wrote songs for the Disney animated film, Wish. Michaels was featured on NF's song "Gone" on his 2023 studio album Hope. In 2024, she featured on the song "Want This Beer" by Josh Ross.

In an Instagram story in August 2024, Michaels confirmed she was an independent artist. It was announced in 2025 that she had started her own independent label, GFY Records, which she began releasing music from.

== Personal life ==
Michaels was in a three-year relationship with record producer Sir Nolan, about whom she wrote Clean Bandit's song "I Miss You".

After collaborating on "There's No Way", Michaels and fellow artist Lauv were in a relationship for several months at the end of 2018.

In July 2019, Michaels started dating Canadian musician JP Saxe. This relationship arose from their collaboration on the duet "If the World Was Ending". In September 2022, it was reported that they had broken up.

Since July 2022, Michaels has been in a relationship with tattoo artist Mat Rule. They announced their engagement in April 2025.

== Filmography ==
| Year | Title | Role | Notes |
|---|---|---|---|
| 2018 | The Voice | Herself | Advisor for Team Adam Levine and musical guest: fourteenth season |
| 2018 | Songwriter | Herself | Documentary |
| 2019 | American Idol | Herself/guest performer | seventeenth season: collaborated with Alyssa Raghu and Logan Johnson |
| 2020 | Songland | Herself | Episode: "Julia Michaels" |
| 2023 | Wish | Songwriter/Singer | |
| 2023 | Glisten and the Merry Mission | Cinnameg (voice) | |

== Discography ==
- Not in Chronological Order (2021)

== Tours ==
Headlining

- Inner Monologue Tour (2019)

Opening act

- Shawn Mendes – Illuminate World Tour (2017)
- Niall Horan – Flicker World Tour (2018)
- Maroon 5 – Red Pill Blues Tour (2018)
- Keith Urban – Graffiti U World Tour (2019)
- Pink – Beautiful Trauma World Tour (2018)

== Awards and nominations ==
Name of the award ceremony, year presented, category, nominee(s) of the award, and the result of the nomination
| Award ceremony | Year | Category | Nominee(s)/work(s) | Result | Ref. |
|---|---|---|---|---|---|
| American Music Awards | 2017 | New Artist of the Year | Herself | Nominated | |
| Astra Film Awards | 2024 | Best Original Song | "This Wish" | Nominated | |
| Billboard Music Awards | 2017 | Top Covered Artist | "Issues" | Nominated | |
| BMI London Awards | 2019 | Pop Award Songs | "I Miss You" | Won | |
| BMI London Awards | 2020 | Pop Award Songs | "2002" | Won | |
| BMI Pop Awards | 2015 | Award-Winning Song | "Slow Down" | Won | |
| BMI Pop Awards | 2016 | Award-Winning Song | "Good for You" | Won | |
| BMI Pop Awards | 2017 | Award-Winning Song | "Close" | Won | |
| BMI Pop Awards | 2017 | Award-Winning Song | "Hands to Myself" | Won | |
| BMI Pop Awards | 2017 | Award-Winning Song | "Sorry" | Won | |
| BMI Pop Awards | 2018 | Award-Winning Song | "All in My Head (Flex)" | Won | |
| BMI Pop Awards | 2018 | Award-Winning Song | "Heavy" | Won | |
| BMI Pop Awards | 2018 | Award-Winning Song | "Issues" | Won | |
| BMI Pop Awards | 2020 | Award-Winning Song | "Drew Barrymore" | Won | |
| BMI Pop Awards | 2021 | Award-Winning Song | "If the World Was Ending" | Won | |
| BMI Pop Awards | 2021 | Award-Winning Song | "Lose You to Love Me" | Won | |
| Canadian Country Music Association Awards | 2025 | Musical Collaboration of the Year | "Want This Beer" (with Josh Ross) | Nominated | |
| CMT Music Awards | 2019 | Video of the Year | "Coming Home" | Nominated | |
| CMT Music Awards | 2019 | Collaborative Video of the Year | "Coming Home" | Won | |
| Grammy Awards | 2018 | Best New Artist | Herself | Nominated | |
| Grammy Awards | 2018 | Song of the Year | "Issues" | Nominated | |
| Grammy Awards | 2021 | Song of the Year | "If the World Was Ending" | Nominated | |
| Grammy Awards | 2022 | Album of the Year (Note: as songwriter) | Back of My Mind | Nominated | |
| Grammy Awards | 2023 | Best Country Song | "Circles Around This Town" | Nominated | |
| Grammy Awards | 2025 | Album of the Year (Note: as songwriter) | Short n' Sweet | Nominated | |
| Hollywood Music in Media Awards | 2023 | Original Song – Animated Film | "This Wish" | Nominated | |
| iHeartRadio Music Awards | 2018 | Best New Pop Artist | Herself | Nominated | |
| iHeartRadio Music Awards | 2018 | Best Remix | "Friends" | Nominated | |
| iHeartRadio Music Awards | 2021 | Best Lyrics | "If the World Was Ending" | Nominated | |
| MTV Video Music Awards | 2017 | Best New Artist | Herself | Nominated | |
| MTV Europe Music Awards | 2017 | Best New | Herself | Nominated | |
| MTV Europe Music Awards | 2017 | Best Push | Herself | Nominated | |
