= James Bay discography =

Discography

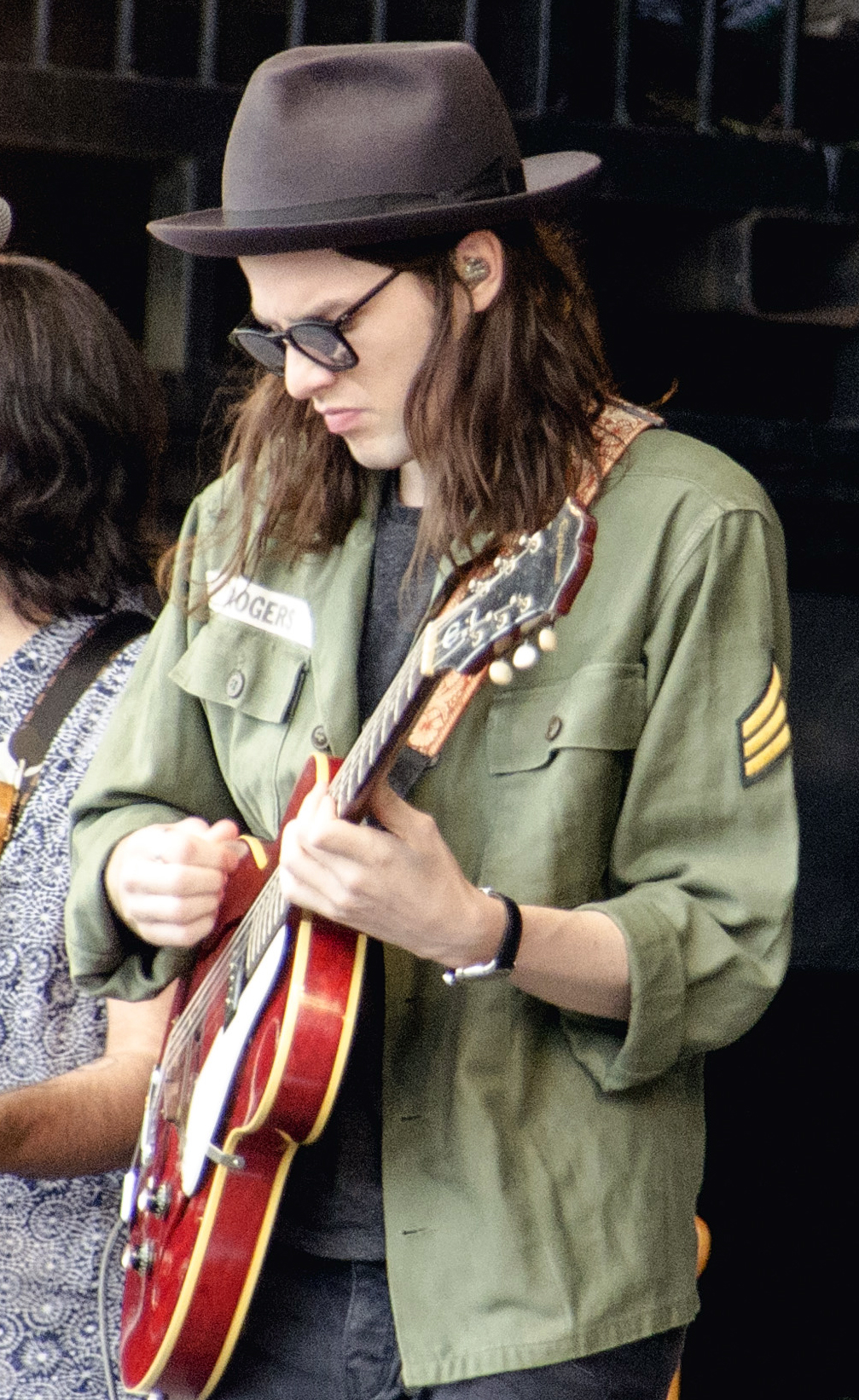
- Bay performing at the Glastonbury Festival on 26 June 2015
- Studio albums: 4
- EPs: 3
- Singles: 24
- Music videos: 22

English singer-songwriter James Bay has released four studio albums, three extended plays, twenty four singles and twenty two music videos.

== Studio albums ==
Title	Details	Peak chart positions										Certifications
Title	Details	UK	AUS	AUT	BEL (FL)	GER	IRE	NLD	NZ	SWI	US	Certifications
Chaos and the Calm	Released: 23 March 2015; Label: Republic; Formats: CD, DL, LP	1	3	2	10	3	1	5	6	1	15	BPI: 3× Platinum; ARIA: Gold; BVMI: Gold; IFPI AUT: Gold; IFPI SWI: Gold; RMNZ: Gold; RIAA: Platinum
Electric Light	Released: 18 May 2018; Label: Virgin EMI, Republic; Formats: CD, DL, LP	2	14	20	24	14	12	13	21	6	21	BPI: Silver
Leap	Released: 8 July 2022; Label: Mercury, Republic; Formats: CD, DL, LP	4	64	—	—	36	—	—	—	9	— (Note: Leap did not enter the US Billboard 200, but peaked at number 95 on the US Album Sales Chart.)	
Changes All the Time	Released: 4 October 2024; Label: Mercury, Republic; Formats: CD, DL, LP	4	—	—	—	—	—	—	—	47	—	
"—" denotes a recording that did not chart or was not released in that territory.

== Extended plays ==
Title	Details	Peak chart positions		
Title	Details	CAN	SWI	US Heat
The Dark of the Morning	Released: 18 July 2013; Label: Universal Republic; Formats: Digital download, 10"	—	—	24
Let It Go	Released: 3 May 2014; Label: Republic; Format: CD, Digital download	—	35	—
Other Sides	Released: 13 January 2015; Label: Republic; Format: Digital download	—	—	—
Oh My Messy Mind	Released: 10 May 2019; Label: Republic; Formats: Digital download, streaming	59	—	—
"—" denotes a recording that did not chart or was not released in that territory.

== Singles ==
=== As lead artist ===
Title	Year	Peak chart positions										Certifications	Album
Title	Year	UK	AUS	AUT	BEL (FL)	GER	IRE	NLD	NZ	SWI	US	Certifications	Album
"Let It Go"	2014	10	8	45	— (Note: "Let It Go" did not enter the Flanders Ultratop 50, but peaked at number 23 on the Ultratip chart.)	22	21	18	10	94	16	BPI: 5× Platinum; ARIA: 3× Platinum; BEA: Gold; BVMI: Platinum; MC: 5× Platinum; NVPI: Platinum; RIAA: 6× Platinum; RMNZ: 6× Platinum	Chaos and the Calm
"Hold Back the River"	2014	2	4	4	7	4	1	14	8	4	— (Note: "Hold Back the River" did not enter the Billboard Hot 100, but peaked at number 1 on the Bubbling Under Hot 100 chart.)	BPI: 5× Platinum; ARIA: 3× Platinum; BVMI: Platinum; IFPI AUT: Gold; IFPI SWI: Gold; NVPI: 2× Platinum; RIAA: Platinum; RMNZ: 4× Platinum	Chaos and the Calm
"Scars"	2015	48	40	—	—	—	71	—	— (Note: "Scars" did not enter the NZ Top 40 Singles Chart, but peaked at number 4 on the NZ Heatseekers chart.)	—	—	BPI: Silver; RMNZ: Gold	Chaos and the Calm
"If You Ever Want to Be in Love"	2015	96	—	—	— (Note: "If You Ever Want to Be in Love" did not enter the Flanders Ultratop 50, but peaked at number three on the Ultratip chart.)	—	—	29	—	—	—	BPI: Platinum; RMNZ: Platinum	Chaos and the Calm
"Best Fake Smile"	2016	54	—	—	— (Note: "Best Fake Smile" did not enter the Flanders Ultratop 50, but peaked at number four on the Ultratip chart.)	—	87	33	—	—	—	BPI: Gold	Chaos and the Calm
"Running"	2016	60	—	—	—	—	—	—	—	—	—		Chaos and the Calm
"Wild Love"	2018	39	—	—	— (Note: "Wild Love" did not enter the Flanders Ultratop 50, but peaked at number 23 on the Ultratip chart.)	—	75	—	— (Note: "Wild Love" did not enter the NZ Top 40 Singles Chart, but peaked at number 10 on the NZ Heatseeker Singles Chart.)	—	—	BPI: Gold; RMNZ: Gold	Electric Light
"Pink Lemonade"	2018	—	—	—	—	—	—	—	—	—	—		Electric Light
"Us" (solo or with Alicia Keys)	2018	— (Note: "US" did not enter the UK Singles Chart, but peaked at number 98 on the UK Singles Sales Chart.)	—	—	—	—	99	—	—	—	—	BPI: Platinum; RIAA: Platinum; RMNZ: Platinum	Electric Light
"Just for Tonight"	2018	—	—	—	—	—	—	—	—	—	—		Electric Light
"Peer Pressure" (featuring Julia Michaels)	2019	85	68	—	— (Note: "Peer Pressure" did not enter the Flanders Ultratop 50, but peaked at number 38 on the Ultratip chart.)	—	62	—	— (Note: "Peer Pressure" did not enter the NZ Top 40 Singles Chart, but peaked at number four on the NZ Hot Singles Chart.)	88	—	BPI: Silver; RMNZ: Platinum	Oh My Messy Mind
"Bad"	2019	—	—	—	—	—	—	—	— (Note: "Bad" did not enter the NZ Top 40 Singles Chart, but peaked at number 14 on the NZ Hot Singles Chart.)	—	—		Oh My Messy Mind
"Chew on My Heart"	2020	— (Note: "Chew on My Heart" did not enter the UK Singles Chart, but peaked at number 41 on the UK Singles Sales Chart.)	—	—	36	—	—	31	—	—	—		Leap
"Give Me the Reason"	2022	— (Note: "Give Me the Reason" did not enter the UK Singles Chart, but peaked at number 12 on the UK Singles Sales Chart.)	—	—	—	—	—	—	—	—	—		Leap
"One Life"	2022	— (Note: "One Life" did not enter the UK Singles Chart, but peaked at number 47 on the UK Singles Sales Chart.)	—	—	—	—	—	—	— (Note: "One Life" did not enter the NZ Top 40 Singles Chart, but peaked at number 38 on the NZ Hot Singles Chart.)	—	—		Leap
"Everybody Needs Someone"	2022	—	—	—	—	—	—	—	—	—	—		Leap
"Save Your Love"	2022	—	—	—	—	—	—	—	—	—	—		Leap
"Goodbye Never Felt So Bad"	2023	—	—	—	—	—	—	—	—	—	—		Non-album singles
"All My Broken Pieces"	2023	—	—	—	—	—	—	—	—	—	—		Non-album singles
"Up All Night" (with the Lumineers and Noah Kahan)	2024	— (Note: "Up All Night" did not enter the UK Singles Chart, but peaked at number 99 on the UK Singles Sales Chart.)	—	—	—	—	—	—	— (Note: "Up All Night" did not enter the NZ Top 40 Singles Chart, but peaked at number six on the NZ Hot Singles Chart.)	—	—		Changes All the Time
"Easy Distraction"	2024	—	—	—	—	—	—	—	—	—	—		Changes All the Time
"Sunshine in the Room" (with Jon Batiste)	2025	—	—	—	—	—	—	—	— (Note: "Sunshine in the Room" did not enter the NZ Top 40 Singles Chart, but peaked at number 38 on the NZ Hot Singles Chart.)	—	—		Changes All the Time (Deluxe)
"You and Me Time" (featuring Sheryl Crow)	2025	—	—	—	—	—	—	—	—	—	—		Changes All the Time (Deluxe)
"—" denotes a single that did not chart or was not released.

=== As featured artist ===
Title	Year	Peak chart positions								Album
Title	Year	BEL (FL)	CAN AC	IRE	NED Tip	NZ Hot	SWE	US Dance	US Pop	Album
"Funeral" (Maisie Peters featuring James Bay)	2021	—	—	—	—	—	—	—	—	Trying: Season 2 (Apple TV+ Original Series Soundtrack)
"Chasing Stars" (Alesso and Marshmello featuring James Bay)	2021	40	44	93	29	15	74	10	30	Non-album single
"—" denotes a single that did not chart or was not released.

== Other charted and certified songs ==
Title	Year	Peak chart positions					Certifications	Album
Title	Year	UK	BEL (FL) Tip	BEL (WA) Tip	SCO	US Rock	Certifications	Album
"Craving"	2015	121	—	—	—	—		Chaos and the Calm
"Move Together"	2015	171	—	—	—	—		Chaos and the Calm
"Incomplete"	2015	179	—	—	—	—		Chaos and the Calm
"When We Were on Fire"	2015	181	10	29	—	—		Chaos and the Calm
"Need the Sun to Break"	2015	—	—	—	—	—	BPI: Silver; RIAA: Gold; RMNZ: Gold	Chaos and the Calm
"Clocks Go Forward"	2015	153	—	—	67	—		Chaos and the Calm
"If I Ain't Got You"	2015	—	—	—	—	—	RMNZ: Gold	James Bay Spotify Session 2015
"Slide"	2018	—	—	—	—	48		Electric Light
"Rescue"	2019	—	—	—	—	43		Oh My Messy Mind
"—" denotes a song that did not chart.

== Songwriting and other appearances ==
Song	Year	Artist(s)	Album	Contribution
"Raging"	2016	Kygo (featuring Kodaline)	Cloud Nine	Co-writer; guitarist
"Two Way"	2016	KT Tunstall	Kin	Co-writer; guitarist; singer
"Kings Highway"	2017	Tom Petty	Cars 3	Singer; guitarist
"Blue No More"	2018	Buddy Guy (featuring James Bay)	The Blues Is Alive and Well	Singer; guitarist
"Minute to Myself"	2019	Tori Kelly	Inspired by True Events	Co-writer; guitarist
"Repair"	2019	Westlife	Spectrum	Co-writer
"Without You"	2019	Westlife	Spectrum	Co-writer
"In a Rocket"	2020	Beoga	"Carousel"	Co-writer
"Funeral"	2021	Maisie Peters	Trying (Apple TV, Series 2)	Co-writer; singer; guitarist
"Biblical"	2021	Calum Scott	Bridges	Co-writer
"Waste"	2024	Myles Smith	A Minute...	Featured artist

== Music videos ==
Title	Year	Director(s)
"Move Together"	2013	Hobby Holmes
"When We Were on Fire"	2013	Alex Shahmiri
"Need the Sun to Break"	2013	Alex Shahmiri
"Clocks Go Forward"	2013	Alex Shahmiri
"Stealing Cars"	2013	Alex Shahmiri
"Hold Back the River"	2014	Mathy & Fran
"Let It Go"	2015	Daniel Kragh-Jacobsen
"Scars"	2015	Nils d'Aulaire, Benno Nelson
"If You Ever Want to Be in Love"	2015	Sophie Muller
"Best Fake Smile"	2016	Emil Nava
"Wild Love"	2018	Marc Klasfeld
"Pink Lemonade"	2018	Philip Andelman
"Us"	2018	Bryan Schlam
"Just for Tonight"	2018	Jackson Ducasse
"Peer Pressure" (featuring Julia Michaels)	2019	Martin Langreve, Magnus Jonsson
"Bad"	2019	Martin Langreve
"Chew on My Heart"	2020	Philip Andelman
"Chasing Stars" (with Alesso & Marshmello)	2021	Jake Jelicich
"Chasing Stars" (Stripped)	2021	Jake Jelicich
"Give Me the Reason"	2022	
"One Life"	2022	Ozzie Pullin
"Save Your Love"	2022	Alexa Cha
