= Sport Relief 2016 =

- Genre: Telethon
- Presented by: Main telethon: Gary Lineker; David Walliams; Davina McCall; Claudia Winkleman; John Bishop; Greg James; Alesha Dixon; Clash of the Titans; Dan Walker; Ore Oduba
- Country of origin: United Kingdom
- Original language: English

Production
- Executive producer: Richard Curtis
- Production location: Queen Elizabeth Olympic Park from Copper Box
- Camera setup: Multiple

Original release
- Network: BBC One, BBC Two
- Release: 18 March – 19 March 2016

Related
- Sport Relief 2014; Sport Relief 2018

Sport Relief 2016 is a fundraising event organised by Sport Relief. A number of run-up events took place and the main event consisted of a live telethon broadcast on BBC One and BBC Two from the evening of Friday 18 March 2016 to early the following morning. Due to the closure of BBC Television Centre, the live studio event is now broadcast from the Queen Elizabeth Olympic Park in London.

== Main event ==
The live telethon was broadcast on BBC One and BBC Two from the evening of Friday 18 March 2016 to early the following morning along with a number of run-up events and was presented by Gary Lineker, Davina McCall, David Walliams, Claudia Winkleman, John Bishop, Greg James, and Alesha Dixon.

=== Presenters ===
Times (approx)	Presenters
19:00–20:30	Gary Lineker and David Walliams
20:30–22:00	John Bishop, Davina McCall and Claudia Winkleman
22:00–22:40	John Bishop, Davina McCall and Claudia Winkleman (BBC Two)
22:40–01:40	Greg James and Alesha Dixon

=== Appeal Film Presenters ===
Stars including Danny Dyer, Clare Balding, Olivia Colman, Rochelle Humes and Marvin Humes presented appeal films.

=== Official single ===
James Bay has recorded the official Sport Relief Single for 2016, a new version of his single "Running" recorded at the Abbey Studios in London.

=== Sketches and Features ===
Title	Brief Description	Starring
Clash of the Titans	Steve Redgrave and Freddie Flintoff lead two teams of celebrities into battle, across an array of Olympic Events live from the Olympic Park including: Wrestling, Women's Track Cycling, Rhythmic Gymnastics, Synchronised Swimming and Triathlon	Steve Redgrave, Freddie Flintoff, Mark Wright, Hugh Dennis, Maddy Hill, Dan Snow, Russell Kane, Clara Amfo, Will Young, Sophie Raworth, Darren Gough, Harry Judd, Paddy McGuinness, Kate Garraway, Omid Djalili with Dan Walker and Ore Oduba
Luther	DCI John Luther is one of Britain's best loved detectives but now it's time to go behind the scenes and meet his family, The Luthers	Idris Elba, Ruth Wilson, Lenny Henry, Rio Ferdinand, Denise Lewis, Louis Smith, Ian Wright, David Haye, Cecilia Noble
Some Mothers Do 'Ave 'Em	Frank Spencer returns and things go awry with some Sporting Heroes	Michael Crawford, Bradley Wiggins, Michele Dotrice, Gemma Arterton, David Walliams, Jenson Button, Andy Murray, Roy Hodgson, Arsène Wenger, Boris Johnson and Paul McCartney
Little Britain	Sports agent Mickey Perm (Flanagan) is tasked with getting Peter Crouch back into the England squad. Only there's a catch – he will be playing for the England Women's Football Team, ‘The Lionesses’. So Mickey enlists Emily Howard to teach Peter how to be a ‘lady’.	David Walliams, Peter Crouch, Micky Flanagan and England Women's Football Team
Behind the Scenes of Some Mothers Do 'Ave 'Em	A look behind the scenes at the return of Some Mothers Do 'Ave 'Em after 40 years away	Michael Crawford and Bradley Wiggins
Smithy for FIFA President	Smithy returns as he campaigns to be the new FIFA President	James Corden
Dizzy Penalties	Greg James takes on John Bishop in a Dizzy Penalty shoot out	Greg James and John Bishop
Jack Whitehall's Football Mission	Jack Whitehall is on a quest to make the England Football Team great once more	Jack Whitehall, Kevin Pietersen, Gareth Bale, Kris Akabusi, Ryan Giggs, Rob Brydon, Tom Jones, Alex Jones, Aled Jones, Robbie Savage, Ruth Jones
Alan Partridge	Alan returns for Sport Relief	Steve Coogan

=== Musical Performances ===
Artist	Song	Notes
James Bay	"Running" and "Hold Back the River"	Official Sport Relief Single.
Birdy	'Wings"	

== Within Other Shows ==
TV programmes that led up to the main event included:

- The Great Comic Relief Bake Off
- Jo Brand's Hell of a Walk for Sport Relief
- Famous, Rich and Homeless
- Let's Play Darts for Sport Relief
- Pointless Celebrities
- The Sport Relief Games Show
- Hell on High Seas
- Eddie Izzard Marathon Man

== Donation progress ==
Time	Amount	Notes
8:29pm	£4,043,587	1hr, 29 mins after show start
9:58pm	£25,086,139	2hr, 58 mins after show start
00:53am	£51,794,847	5hr, 53 mins after show start
01:35am	£55,444,906	Final total for the night
