= Sport Relief =

Sporting charity

- Logo from the 2008 telethon
- Genre: Charity telethon
- Created by: Comic Relief; BBC Sport
- Presented by: Gary Lineker; Davina McCall; Claudia Winkleman; Ore Oduba; Freddie Flintoff; Paddy McGuinness
- Country of origin: United Kingdom
- Original language: English

Production
- Production locations: BBC Television Centre (2002–12); Copper Box Arena (2014–16); Dock10 (2018–20)
- Camera setup: Multi-camera
- Running time: Various

Original release
- Network: BBC One; BBC Two
- Release: 13 July 2002 – 13 March 2020

Related
- Children in Need (1980–present); Comic Relief (1985–present)

Sport Relief was a biennial charity event from Comic Relief, in association with BBC Sport, established in 2002.

It was the idea of Kevin Cahill, CBE, who had joined Comic Relief in 1991 to establish a new department as Director of Education and Communications and went on to become its creative director and CEO. Now joint Honorary Life President with Sir Lenny Henry, Cahill joined having created the Education Department at the National Theatre in London and been its first Head.

In 2021, Comic Relief announced that from 2022 it was changing from alternating Sport Relief and Red Nose Day campaigns to Red Nose Day becoming annual and Sport Relief evolving into a year-round brand. The annual Red Nose Day telethon would now take place at Dock10, MediaCityUK in Salford.

== On television ==
Like Red Nose Day, historically the Sport Relief telethon show began after the six o'clock news, with the usual BBC One schedule suspended at 7pm in favour of a live programme, with a break at 10pm for the News. However, whilst the BBC News at Ten was aired on BBC One, Sport Relief continued on BBC Two, and then resumed on BBC One at 10:35pm, with each hour overseen by a different celebrity host team. All the celebrity talent who represent Comic Relief's campaigns agree to do so for no fee.

=== Presenters ===
- Gary Lineker (2002–2020)
- Paddy McGuinness (2018–2020)
- Alex Scott (2020)
- Emma Willis (2020)
- Rylan Clark-Neal (2020)
- Oti Mabuse (2020)
- Tom Allen (2020)
- Maya Jama (2020)
- Jamie Theakston (2002–2004)
- Clare Balding (2002–2014)
- Ulrika Jonsson (2002)
- Gabby Logan (2004–2014)
- Tess Daly (2004)
- Davina McCall (2006–2018)
- Chris Evans (2006)
- Richard Hammond (2008–2012)
- Claudia Winkleman (2010–2018)
- Fearne Cotton (2010–2014)
- James Corden (2010–2012)
- Patrick Kielty (2010–2012)
- Christine Bleakley (2010)
- David Walliams (2012–2016)
- Dermot O'Leary (2012)
- Miranda Hart (2012)
- Ore Oduba (2012–2018)
- Jack Whitehall (2014)
- Greg James (2016)
- Alesha Dixon (2016)
- Freddie Flintoff (2018)

== Official singles ==
The first Sport Relief single in 2002 was "Your Song", re-recorded as a duet by original artist Elton John and Italian opera singer Alessandro Safina, reaching number 4 on the chart. In 2004, "Some Girls" by Rachel Stevens made it to number 2 and in 2006, the third ever Sport Relief single, "Don't Stop Me Now"/"Please, Please" by McFly, was the first to top the UK Singles Chart, selling 36,496 units in the week ending 29 July 2006. In 2008, the Sport Relief single was by Leona Lewis with her single "Footprints in the Sand", though it was officially released as a double A-side with "Better in Time". In 2010, the single was "Morning Sun", sung by Robbie Williams. In 2012, the song was "Proud", sung by JLS and in 2014 "Word Up!" sung by Little Mix both peaking at the 6th position. In 2016, "Running" sung by James Bay peaked at No. 60.

Release Date	Title	Artists	Peak Position
15 July 2002	"Your Song"	Elton John; Alessandro Safina	4
12 July 2004	"Some Girls"	Rachel Stevens	2
17 July 2006	"Don't Stop Me Now" "Please, Please"	McFly	1
9 March 2008	"Better in Time" "Footprints in the Sand"	Leona Lewis	2
8 March 2010	"Morning Sun"	Robbie Williams	45
19 March 2012	"Proud"	JLS	6
16 March 2014	"Word Up!"	Little Mix	6
11 March 2016	"Running"	James Bay	60

== History ==
=== 2002 event ===
The first Sport Relief show was presented by Gary Lineker, Ulrika Jonsson, Jamie Theakston and Clare Balding and included Stephen Fry hosting a special edition of They Think It's a Question of Sport, John Inverdale and Suzi Perry resurrecting the classic 1970s series Superstars. The first ever bout of Celebrity Boxing when Bob Mortimer beat Les Dennis on points on Saturday 13 July 2002. The final total on the night was £10,072,068.

Other items were Sport in the Square where cast members from EastEnders and Holby City/Casualty took part in a series of sporting challenges, Runaround, with Johnny Vegas, music from Gareth Gates and Will Young and contributions from Nick Hancock, Patrick Kielty, Angus Deayton, Ronni Ancona, Alistair McGowan, Audley Harrison, Alec Stewart, Tanni Grey-Thompson and Sir Steve Redgrave.

One of the highlights of the campaign came at the end of the final of the Stella Artois tennis championship when there was a surprise additional match for Sport Relief between the Prime Minister, Tony Blair and Pat Cash against Ilie Năstase and Alistair McGowan. Blair and Cash won the specially reduced set 4–1. Tony Hawks was the courtside commentator and the game was shown live on Sunday Grandstand.

=== 2004 event ===
The second Sport Relief was on Saturday 10 July 2004. The main show was on BBC One from 19.00 to 00.30. The first half was presented by Gary Lineker and Gabby Logan and the second half by Jamie Theakston and Tess Daly.

In the first half of the show (19.00–21.00), Cilla Black hosted a celebrity version of Inter-Channel Superstars where the BBC squad took on teams from ITV, Channel 4 and Five, the stars of Strictly Come Dancing performed a special routine to a re-mix of iconic BBC Sport theme tunes, Bruce Forsyth was on hand to present a cheque, Patrick Kielty was live in the studio to talk about the Indian railway project he had visited, Rachel Stevens performed the Sport Relief single "Some Girls", Dick and Dom introduced Ray Stubbs being swung from a crane into a giant ball of dung and Stephen Fry hosted another edition of A Question of Sport Relief.

While the News and Lottery were on BBC One, there was a brand new show on BBC Two, Stars in Fast Cars which featured Alan Davies, Jodie Kidd, Patrick Kielty, Jimmy Carr and Darren Jordon competing in a variety of car related races and stunts.

The second half of the main show was back on BBC One from 21.30 BC to 00.30. BC Angus Deayton looked at Sports Stars in adverts, Lionel Richie and Badly Drawn Boy performed live in the studio, Jon Culshaw unveiled his Wayne Rooney impersonation, and Paul Whitehouse's Ron Manager interrogated David Beckham about his texting technique. Eamonn Holmes was the host when Rugby took on Football with teams that included Dion Dublin, Lee Sharpe, Martin Offiah and Matt Dawson and in this year's Celebrity Boxing Ben Fogle beat Sid Owen. Colin Jackson, Sir Steve Redgrave and Arsène Wenger were amongst the sporting names who also appeared live on the show.

The show also included highlights of some of the Sport Relief Miles which had attracted 81,000 at giant and local events in all parts of the UK. Jo Brandy was on hand to represent them and talk about her experiences at the Brighton Mile.

Throughout the night, there were also a whole series of appeal films to show where the Sport Relief money had already been spent and where the need was greatest. They were made by BBC Bristol and included Nick Knowles in Africa, Patrick Kielty in India and Victoria Beckham in Peru.

The campaign itself involved 253 celebrities and raised £16 million. The final total on the night of the telethon was £11,078,359.

=== 2006 event ===
The third Sport Relief took place on 15 July 2006, with a whole day of programming across the BBC that culminated in the main evening show on BBC One at 7pm. Gary Lineker, Chris Evans and Davina McCall were the hosts for the entire evening.

The programme came live from TC1 at Television Centre and featured its line up of notable names.

The second half was back on BBC One from 22.30 to 01.00. It included golf legend Nick Faldo competing against Lineker and Evans in a comedy pitching competition on the roof of the studio where they had to get their balls into the mouths of giant cut outs of Bruce Forsyth and Jimmy Tarbuck, the second part of A Question of Sport Relief, Jon Culshaw's live performance as George W. Bush, Catherine Tate in a new football sketch as Joanie "Nan" Taylor from The Catherine Tate Show and Sir Steve Redgrave and Colin Jackson taking part in a live power pint competition. There was also the last ever edition of Footballer's Wives which had been transferred from ITV for the night and included a guest appearance by Graham Norton as Brendan Spunk, José González performed in the studio, several members of the Sport Relief Red Socks cricket team were there to talk about their tour to India, including Harry Judd, Nick Hancock, Nick Knowles, Jack Russell and Phil Tufnell whilst Derek Acorah starred in a new sketch based in the Match of the Day studio. The third Sport Relief Celebrity Boxing bout was won by Jack Osbourne who defeated the former S Club 7 singer Bradley McIntosh. It was presented by Mark Durden-Smith with Dave Spikey as ringmaster.

British pop band McFly covered the hit song "Don't Stop Me Now" originally by Queen as the official single for the event. It reached number one on the UK Singles Chart.

The final total raised during Sport Relief 2006 was £18 million.

=== 2008 event ===
Sport Relief moved to March in 2008. BBC One's night of fundraising was held on Friday 14 March and the Sport Relief Miles took place all around the UK on Sunday 16 March. It was presented on stage by Richard Hammond, Gary Lineker & Davina McCall. Bruce Forsyth & Tess Daly presented Sport Relief Does Strictly Come Dancing. Richard Hammond, Jeremy Clarkson & James May presented Top Ground Gear Force. Jimmy Carr presented A Question of Sport Relief with the team captains Sue Barker and Gary Lineker. Sir Alan Sugar presented Sport Relief Does the Apprentice. There were occasional appearances by Jonathan Ross, Jimmy Carr, Michael Parkinson, Patrick Kielty, Claudia Winkleman & Tess Daly.

The BBC presented another version of Sport Relief Does the Apprentice with 10 celebrities. Also, new for this year, a special episode of Strictly Come Dancing was shown.

That year's Celebrity Boxing saw Ben Shephard of GMTV beat Lemar on judge's vote.

The final total raised on the television broadcast was £19,640,321. During the telethon, a mystery donor donated £5.5million to the charity.

=== 2010 event ===
Sport Relief was broadcast on 19–21 March 2010. The appeal show was aired as usual on BBC One and BBC Two on 19 March from 19:00 to 01:30. A special of Strictly Come Dancing (filmed on The Live Tour on Saturday 6 February) aired as well as Let's Dance for Sport Relief.

On CBBC there were special shows dedicated to Sport Relief including a special edition of Dani's House and Paddy McGuiness hosted a new series, Sport Relief does We Are the Champions.

The total raised on the night of broadcast was £31,633,091.

James Corden also performed various comedy sketches with British athletes like Andy Murray (tennis), David Beckham (football) and Tom Daley (diving).

Lawrence Dallaglio embarked on a gruelling cycle from Rome to Edinburgh during the RBS 6 Nations Championship to raise money for Sport Relief and the Dallaglio Foundation. The Dallaglio Cycle Slam took place over the course of a month, seeing a team cycling through all of the RBS 6 Nations countries, taking in each of the international rugby stadia along the way. The aim was to raise £1million and £1.14 million was raised with 50% going to Sport Relief 2010.

=== 2012 event ===
The 2012 event appeal ran from 23 to 25 March 2012, with the television show airing on 23 March 2012.

On the night, there were specials from Outnumbered with Frank Lampard and Christine Bleakley, Miranda at Royal Albert Hall Tennis Tournament with many sports stars, Twenty Twelve with Zara Phillips and Sir Steve Redgrave talking about how they should advertise the Olympics on Sport Relief, Strictly Come Dancing Underwater with Chelsee Healey and Harry Judd, Horrible Histories and Stephen Fry with Amir Khan and Jermain Defoe, Benidorm meets Britain's Got Talent with the new judges, Saturday Kitchen with the English football team QI, A Question of Sport with Sue Barker as you have never seen her before, Celebrity Juice, Mo Farah takes on the race of his life against Misery Bear, 8 out of 10 Cats, Mock the Week, Kate Moss, Stella McCartney, Colin Jackson and Linford Christie are among the star names appearing with Jennifer Saunders and Joanna Lumley in a special edition of Absolutely Fabulous and Jake Humphrey presents a special Never Mind the Buzzcocks with Louise Redknapp and Melanie C alongside the regulars.

On the night, there were performances from LMFAO, Snow Patrol, and JLS who performed the Sport Relief single with Emeli Sandé and rugby players in the chorus. JLS also did a concert for Sport Relief.

The total raised on the night of broadcast was £50,447,197.

==== Before the main event ====
In January 2012, there was a series called The Great Sport Relief Bake Off, which had celebrities competing. Anita Rani won the series, which also featured Angela Griffin, Arlene Phillips, Sarah Hadland, James Wong, Saira Khan, Pearl Lowe, Joe Swift and Fi Glover amongst the other contestants who took part. Another series of Let's Dance for Sport Relief ran up to the telethon weekend for five weeks. It was won by Rowland Rivron who danced to "Weapon of Choice" by Fatboy Slim. A new series of Sport Relief Does Glee Club started on Monday 12 March running with one episode each weekday. The first eight episodes were 30 minutes long then there was a live semi-final and final, on Sport Relief day, which were 45 minutes long.

Segments of this and past Sport Relief events aired as part of Sport Relief Goes Global weeks after the event, in which parts of the program could be viewed in other countries including sketches from Miranda, Outnumbered, Smithy, and "David Walliams Swims the Thames".

=== 2014 event ===
Sport Relief 2014 took place from Friday 21 to Sunday 23 March 2014. The official campaign launch took place on Tuesday 21 January 2014. The Annual Live Telethon was broadcast live from the Queen Elizabeth Olympic Park for the first time, on Friday 21 March. It was hosted by Gary Lineker, David Walliams, Davina McCall, Fearne Cotton, Jack Whitehall and Claudia Winkleman. The Clash of the Titans was hosted by Gabby Logan and Clare Balding.

In January 2014, the BBC announced that the 2014 edition of its Sport Relief broadcast on 21 March 2014 would feature a new Only Fools and Horses sketch.

During the three weeks before the telethon, Sport Relief's Top Dog aired on BBC Two with Gaby Roslin as host.

The Sport Relief Mile was joined by three major cycling events (in London, Manchester and Glasgow) and over 600 Swimathons, under the umbrella title of "The Sport Relief Games". The main public faces of the three sections of the "games" were Jessica Ennis-Hill, Ellie Simmonds and Chris Hoy. Advance entry opened on 24 September 2013, nearly four months ahead of the official campaign launch.

John Bishop and Sebastian Coe competed against each other for the Clash of the Titans event at the Queen Elizabeth Olympic Park along with their celebrity teams.

The total raised on the night of broadcast was £51,242,186.

=== 2016 event ===
Sport Relief 2016 took place from Friday 18 to Sunday 20 March 2016. The Sport Relief Mile and Swimathon both returned. John Bishop, Gary Lineker, David Walliams, Claudia Winkleman, Davina McCall, Greg James and Alesha Dixon hosted. Ore Oduba and Dan Walker hosted Clash of the Titans taking over from Logan and Balding.

The total raised on the night of broadcast was £55,444,906.

=== 2018 event ===
Sport Relief 2018 took place from Saturday 17 to Friday 23 March 2018 and was broadcast live from dock10 studios. The total raised on the night of broadcast was £38,195,278.

=== 2020 event ===
Sport Relief 2020 was the last ever Sport Relief event held from Monday 9 to Friday 13 March 2020. Gary Lineker and Paddy McGuinness returned as hosts for the Sport Relief night of TV from the dock10 studios, which aired on BBC One on 13 March. The total raised on the night of broadcast was £40,540,355.

== Sport Relief Mile ==
The Sport Relief Mile was created to give the campaign a focus with an event that was open to anyone to run, walk, jog, wheel, bounce or crawl, regardless of ability or age. It was also designed to celebrate the 50th anniversary of Sir Roger Bannister's first sub-four-minute mile. Participants could also choose to cover 3 miles or 6 miles (close to, but slightly shorter than, the 5K and 10K distances more commonly used in mass runs).

81,000 people took part in the first Sport Relief Mile, sponsored by Fitness First, in 2004. Sainsbury's was the official sponsor of the Mile.

In 2006, more than 423,000 people took part in the Sport Relief Mile, making it one of the biggest mass participation events in history. The Sport Relief Mile Show on BBC One on the morning of Saturday 15 July was presented by John Inverdale and Colin Jackson and drew an audience of almost a million with an 18% share.

Among the 20,000 participants who took part at London's Embankment were Lord Coe, Dame Kelly Holmes, Sportacus, McFly, Michael Watson, Tessa Sanderson, G4, Jamie Oliver and Sadie Frost.

Televised Miles were also held in Brighton, Southampton, Plymouth, Bristol, Cardiff, Belfast, Manchester, Glasgow, Newcastle/Gateshead, Leeds, Hull, Nottingham, Birmingham and Ipswich.

Children from Amsterdam, Netherlands (The British School of Amsterdam) took part in 2008 and along with children from Voorschoten, Netherlands (The British School in the Netherlands) again in 2010.

John Inverdale has hosted every Sport Relief Mile Show, initially with Colin Jackson in 2004 and 2006, with Jake Humphrey in 2008, with Chris Hollins, Fern Britton & Helen Skelton in 2010 and from 2012 alongside The One Show presenters Matt Baker & Alex Jones.

The Sport Relief Mile was changed for 2014 where participants can run, swim or cycle 1 mile or indeed do all three. The Sport Relief Games were broadcast on Sunday 23 March 2014 on BBC One and were hosted from London by John Inverdale, Alex Jones and Matt Baker with reporters in Cardiff, Glasgow & Belfast. The second Sport Relief Games was shown on Sunday 20 March 2016 on BBC One.

The last Sport Relief Mile was held in 2016, with the campaign's focus moving back to individual challenges instead of mass events from 2018 onwards.

== Other events ==
Sport Relief provides material for the BBC and is part of a UK registered charity 326568 called Charity Projects.

In 2009, the charity awarded a total of £36m in grants with net assets of £120m, of which £97m is in fixed asset investments such as funds in equities and bonds. The charity reported staff costs of £6m plus agency staff costs of £6m. The charity will also be receiving a UK government grant of £5m in 2010.

In 2006, David Walliams swam the English Channel to raise money for Sport Relief. He trained for 9 months with Professor Greg Whyte of the English Institute for Sport and was also helped by the "King of the Channel", Mike Read, chairman of the Channel Swimming Association. Walliams' feat was documented for a BBC programme called Little Britain's Big Swim. Walliams also swam the Gibraltar Strait for the 2008 campaign.

In 2006, the BBC staged a celebrity elimination show jumping competition called Only Fools on Horses, which raised over £250,000.

On 26 July 2009, Eddie Izzard began running a series of 43 marathons over 51 days for Sport Relief. On 15 September, Izzard arrived in Trafalgar Square, marking the end of his 43rd marathon in only 51 days. He ran 42.195 kilometres (26.219 mi) a day, 6 days a week for 7 weeks straight, covering 1,166 miles (1,876 km) across the UK. Izzard raised over £1,152,510 for Sport Relief. On 23 February 2016, Izzard began a series of 27 marathons in 27 days running across South Africa for Sport Relief; the number 27 refers to the number of years spent in prison by Nelson Mandela. He completed the last marathon on 20 March, arriving at the statue of Mandela outside the Union Buildings in Pretoria, covering 1,134 kilometres (705 mi), in temperatures in excess of 40 °C (104 °F), and raising £1,648,087. He had attempted this effort in 2012, but was forced to back out due to health concerns.

In 2014, Davina McCall took on a Sport Relief challenge to raise money for the appeal. This was called Davina: Beyond Breaking Point, which saw the presenter tackle bike riding, running and swimming for seven days as she travelled from the north of the country (outside Edinburgh Castle) to the end (in Central London). Alex Jones also took part in a Sport Relief challenge which saw her climb up a rock in Utah, United States. Extensive coverage of this event was shown on The One Show.

== Partners ==
- Amazon
- Bannatyne
- Better
- BBC (TV broadcasts)
- BT
- Bing
- Ernst & Young
- Fitness First
- HSBC
- Highland Spring
- John Smith's
- Kellogg's
- Manchester City F.C.
- Oracle
- Barclays Premier League
- RBS
- Royal Caribbean International
- Rugby Football League (RFL)
- Ryman
- Sainsbury's
- Sock Shop
- Sports Direct
- Speedo
- The FA
- Unilever

== See also ==
- Comic Relief
- Sport Aid
- Children in Need
