= If You Ever Want to Be in Love =

Single by James Bay

from the album Chaos and the Calm
- Released: 29 October 2015
- Recorded: 2013–14
- Studio: Blackbird (Nashville, Tennessee)
- Genre: Blues rock; alternative rock
- Length: 3:58
- Label: Republic
- Songwriters: James Bay; Jimmy Hogarth; Steve McEwan
- Producer: Jacquire King

James Bay singles chronology
"Scars" (2015)	"If You Ever Want to Be in Love" (2015)	"Best Fake Smile" (2016)

Music video
- "If You Ever Want to Be in Love" on YouTube

"If You Ever Want to Be in Love" is a song by English singer-songwriter James Bay. It was released in the United Kingdom on 29 October 2015 through Republic Records as the fourth single from his debut studio album Chaos and the Calm (2014) after originally being included on Bay's 2014 Let It Go EP. The single was certified platinum in the United Kingdom in August 2024.

== Background ==
Bay told PopCrush the song is "about a few different experiences and scenarios" saying "I was really keen to [move away from home] when I was 18, and I moved about 2-3 hours away ... Suddenly, I was really aware of the feeling every time I went home back to the town where I grew up in. When [I'd see my home town friends] again, there was always that talk of we're all back in this town -- it was a small town. We'd come together and one of the stories amongst all of this is always, "I saw that girl who I had something going on with and it really it sort of fizzled out and didn't end up being anything because we both went to different parts of the country." Some people have that feeling of "what if?" and that slight feeling of regret that they moved away. So the song is kind of referencing that whole part of your life where you leave and whenever you come back to visit, there's those things that make you think "What if I hadn't left?" There's those reminders, maybe still there. Or maybe you've come back to visit as well and it's kind of about chance meeting between two people who started from the same place, went away and came back again."

== Music video ==
A music video to accompany the release of "If You Ever Want to Be in Love" was first released onto YouTube on 29 October 2015 at a total length of four minutes and forty-three seconds. The clip was directed by Sophie Mueller and was filmed at Fiddler's Elbow in Camden, a pub James often played before becoming famous.

== Charts ==
=== Weekly charts ===
Chart (2015–16)	Peak position
Belgium (Ultratip Bubbling Under Flanders)	53
Slovenia (SloTop50)	46
UK Singles (OCC)	96

=== Year-end charts ===
Chart (2018)	Position
Iceland (Plötutíóindi)	31

== Certifications ==
Region	Certification	Certified units/sales
Denmark (IFPI Danmark)	Gold	45,000^{‡}
Italy (FIMI)	Gold	25,000^{‡}
New Zealand (RMNZ)	Platinum	30,000^{‡}
Portugal (AFP)	Gold	10,000^{‡}
United Kingdom (BPI)	Platinum	600,000^{‡}
^{‡} Sales+streaming figures based on certification alone.

== Release history ==
Region	Date	Format	Label
United Kingdom	29 October 2015	Digital download, streaming	Republic
