= Running (James Bay song) =

Single by James Bay

from the album Chaos and the Calm
- Released: 11 March 2016
- Recorded: 2016
- Studio: Abbey Road (London, UK)
- Genre: Alternative rock
- Length: 3:40
- Label: Republic
- Songwriter(s): James Bay
- Producer(s): James Bay

James Bay singles chronology
"Best Fake Smile" (2016)	"Running" (2016)	"Wild Love" (2018)

Music video
- "Running" on YouTube

"Running" is a song by English singer-songwriter James Bay. The song was released on 11 March 2016 through Republic Records as the sixth and final single from his debut studio album Chaos and the Calm (2015) after originally being included on Bay's 2014 Let It Go EP. The single version was re-recorded in 2016 at Abbey Road Studios for Sport Relief 2016 with 54 pence from every download going to the fundraising appeal . Bay told Digital Spy "There's a universally positive message, which is Sport Relief's ethos. It's about saying we can help, we can work together, and we can achieve something better."

Bay performed the song live on stage at the Sports Relief 2016 on 18 March 2016.

== Reception ==
Michelle Geslani from Consequence of Sound said "Maybe it’s the soothing hum of the piano, the sing-a-long worthy melodies that rise and fall with grace, or the soulful devotion of the whole thing... Either way, it’s a captivating listen through and through."

== Music video ==
A music video to accompany the release of "Running" was directed by James Russell and released onto YouTube on 11 March 2016.

== Charts ==
Chart (2016)	Peak position
UK Singles (OCC)	60

== Release history ==
Region	Date	Format	Label
Worldwide	11 March 2016	Digital download, streaming	Republic Records
