= Us (James Bay song) =

- Duet single cover

Single by James Bay

from the album Electric Light
- Released: 30 March 2018
- Genre: Pop rock; Indie rock
- Length: 3:01
- Label: Republic
- Songwriters: James Bay; Jonathan Green
- Producers: James Bay; Paul Epworth; Jon Green

James Bay singles chronology
"Pink Lemonade" (2018)	"Us" (2018)	"Just for Tonight" (2018)

Alicia Keys singles chronology
"Blended Family (What You Do for Love)" (2016)	"Us" (2018)	"Calma (Alicia remix)" (2019)

"Us" is a song recorded by English singer-songwriter James Bay, from his second studio album, Electric Light (2018). The song was released by Republic Records on 30 March 2018 as the third single off the album.

== Background and release ==
Bay told Entertainment Weekly: "I've been lucky enough to meet people all over the world and witness the phenomenal strength of crowds. I wrote this song to explore unity and inclusion. Looking through the lens of my own personal relationships, this song turned out to be a particularly important moment on the album for me."

The song was re-released as a duet with Alicia Keys on 22 May 2018.

== Music video ==
The official music video to accompany the release of "Us" was directed by Bryan Schlam and first released on YouTube on 18 April 2018, through James Bay's official YouTube account.

Throughout the clip, Bay plays piano in an empty room. The visuals cycle through intimate shots of ordinary life: one person stares into a bathroom mirror, another reclines in the grass next to sprinklers, eats at a diner, daydreams in church. The video ends with the diverse cast united for the camera, emphasizing the title "Us" with the words "me", "you", "them", "him" and "her" crossed out.

== Reception ==
Ruth Kiane from Entertainment Weekly said: "The guitar-led track is more mellow than up-tempo second single "Pink Lemonade" and electro-inspired album lead "Wild Love" its smooth lyrics and sultry notes fit well into the singer's oeuvre. "I believe in something, I believe in us," sings Bay, which is reminiscent of his work on his debut Chaos and the Calm.

== Live performances ==
- The Voice (American season 14)
- Late Night with Seth Myers, 2018

== Track listing ==
Digital download
No.	Title	Length
1.	"Us" (album version)	3:01

Digital download – acoustic version
No.	Title	Length
1.	"Us" (acoustic)	3:01

Digital download – duet version
No.	Title	Length
1.	"Us" (with Alicia Keys)	3:07

== Charts ==
Chart (2018)	Peak position
Belgium (Ultratop 50 Wallonia) Duet version	4

== Certifications ==
Region	Certification	Certified units/sales
Brazil (Pro-Música Brasil)	2× Platinum	80,000^{‡}
Denmark (IFPI Danmark)	Platinum	90,000^{‡}
Italy (FIMI)	Gold	35,000^{‡}
New Zealand (RMNZ)	Platinum	30,000^{‡}
Poland (ZPAV)	Gold	25,000^{‡}
Portugal (AFP)	Gold	5,000^{‡}
Spain (Promusicae)	Gold	30,000^{‡}
United Kingdom (BPI)	Platinum	600,000^{‡}
United States (RIAA)	Platinum	1,000,000^{‡}
^{‡} Sales+streaming figures based on certification alone.

== Release history ==
Country	Date	Format	Version	Label	Ref.
Various	30 March 2018	Digital download; streaming	Original	Republic	
Various	27 April 2018	Digital download; streaming	Acoustic	Republic	
Various	22 May 2018	Digital download; streaming	Duet	Republic	
