= Pink Lemonade (song) =

2018 single by James Bay

Single by James Bay

from the album Electric Light
- Released: 7 March 2018
- Genre: Dance-rock
- Length: 4:14
- Label: Republic
- Songwriters: James Bay; Jonathan Green
- Producers: James Bay; Paul Epworth; Jon Green

James Bay singles chronology
"Wild Love" (2018)	"Pink Lemonade" (2018)	"Us" (2018)

"Pink Lemonade" is a song recorded by English singer-songwriter James Bay, from his second studio album, Electric Light (2018). The song was released by Republic Records on 7 March 2018 as the second single off the album.

In April, Bay performed the song on Late Night with Seth Meyers.

== Music video ==
The official music video was directed by Phil Andelman and released on 26 March 2018.

"The clip opens with Bay wearing a sparkling crew neck sweater while he and his band play on an Ed Sullivan Show type of broadcast playing into the living rooms of quiet suburban homes. Bay, who takes on the role as an astronaut trapped on Earth, is seen sneaking into a house's garage late at night to build a rocket ship. The highly anticipated blast off at the end of the video reveals the truth — a young Bay sitting in a 'rocket' made out of a silver cardboard box, and the fantasy of escaping our planet vanishes."

Bay said, "The inspiration behind the video comes from the theme of escape that runs through the song. I was reminded of a time when I was about 4 years old and I told my parents I'd had enough of living with them and would be leaving home."

== Reception ==
Rania Aniftos from Rolling Stone called the single "catchy" and a "delicious new rock song".

Jon Blisten, also from Rolling Stone, said, "'Pink Lemonade' marks a notable departure from both the stripped-down folk of Bay's debut album, but also the textured electronic sound of Electric Light's lead single, 'Wild Love'. Instead, the tune embraces a dance-rock sound reminiscent of The Strokes or Hot Hot Heat."

== Track listing ==
Album version
No.	Title	Writer(s)	Length
1.	"Pink Lemonade" (Album version)	James Bay; Jonathan Green	4:14

Album version
No.	Title	Writer(s)	Length
1.	"Pink Lemonade" (Acoustic)	James Bay; Jonathan Green	4:23

== Charts ==
Weekly chart performance for "Pink Lemonade"
Chart (2018)	Peak position
US Rock & Alternative Airplay (Billboard)	26

== Certifications ==
Region	Certification	Certified units/sales
Canada (Music Canada)	Gold	40,000^{‡}
^{‡} Sales+streaming figures based on certification alone.

== Release history ==
Country	Date	Format	Version	Label	Ref.
Various	7 March 2018	Digital download, streaming	album version	Republic	
Various	20 April 2018	Digital Download, streaming	acoustic version	Republic	
