= Best Fake Smile =

Single by James Bay

from the album Chaos and the Calm
- Released: 2 March 2016
- Recorded: 2013–14
- Studio: Blackbird (Nashville, Tennessee)
- Genre: Blues rock; alternative rock
- Length: 3:26
- Label: Republic
- Songwriters: Iain Archer; James Bay
- Producer: Jacquire King

James Bay singles chronology
"If You Ever Want to Be in Love" (2015)	"Best Fake Smile" (2016)	"Running" (2016)

Music video
- "Best Fake Smile" on YouTube

"Best Fake Smile" is a song by English singer-songwriter James Bay. It was released in the United Kingdom on 2 March 2016 through Republic Records as the fifth single from his debut studio album Chaos and the Calm (2014).

== Music video ==
A music video to accompany the release of "Best Fake Smile" was first released onto YouTube on 3 March 2016 at a total length of three minutes and fifty-seven seconds.

== Track listing ==
Digital download
No.	Title	Writer(s)	Length
1.	"Best Fake Smile"	Iain Archer; James Bay	3:26

== Charts ==
=== Weekly charts ===
Chart (2014–2016)	Peak position
Belgium (Ultratip Bubbling Under Flanders)	4
Hungary (Rádiós Top 40)	13
Ireland (IRMA)	87
Latvia (Latvijas Top 40)	40
UK Singles (OCC)	54
Netherlands (Dutch Top 40)	33

=== Year-end charts ===
Chart (2016)	Position
Hungary (Rádiós Top 40)	36

== Certifications ==
Region	Certification	Certified units/sales
United Kingdom (BPI)	Gold	400,000^{‡}
^{‡} Sales+streaming figures based on certification alone.

== Release history ==
Region	Date	Format	Label
United Kingdom	2 March 2016	Digital download	Republic
