= Scars (James Bay song) =

2015 single by James Bay

Single by James Bay

from the album Chaos and the Calm
- Released: 28 August 2015
- Recorded: 2013–14
- Studio: Blackbird (Nashville, Tennessee)
- Genre: Blues rock; soul; folk rock
- Length: 4:32
- Label: Republic
- Songwriter: James Bay
- Producer: Jacquire King

James Bay singles chronology
"Hold Back the River" (2014)	"Scars" (2015)	"If You Ever Want to Be in Love" (2015)

"Scars" is a song by English singer-songwriter James Bay from his debut studio album Chaos and the Calm (2015). It was released exclusively to digital retailers on 8 January 2015 by Republic Records. The song is to be released on 28 August 2015 as the third single from Bay's debut studio album Chaos and the Calm (2015). An audio video supporting the song was also uploaded on January 8, 2015, on YouTube. The song was written by Bay himself and produced by Jacquire King.

== Background and release ==
The song was released on 8 January 2015. Prior to this, it was also immediately available buy pre-ordering his debut studio album Chaos and the Calm, which was released on March 23, 2015.

== Critical reception ==
The song earned early acclaim from Aimee Curran of Baeble Music, whom praised Bay's "soulful, indie sound" and that "there's no reason why you wouldn't want it in your permanent music catalog." On 13 January 2015, Spotify listed the song at number 4 on the Top 10 Most Viral Tracks in the UK.

== Music video ==
The music video was released on 28 August 2015 and directed by Benno Nelson and Nils d'Aulaire.

== Live performances ==
Bay has performed the song at the Bing Lounge on 4 June 2014, at the Beacons Festival on 21 August 2014 and recently at BBC Radio 1's Future Festival in January 2015.

== Track listing ==
- Digital download
1. "Scars" – 4:32

== Charts ==
Chart (2015)	Peak position
Australia (ARIA)	40
Ireland (IRMA)	71
New Zealand Heatseekers (RMNZ)	4
UK Singles (OCC)	48

== Certifications ==
Region	Certification	Certified units/sales
New Zealand (RMNZ)	Gold	7,500^{*}
United Kingdom (BPI)	Silver	200,000^{‡}
^{*} Sales figures based on certification alone.^{‡} Sales+streaming figures based on certification alone.

== Release history ==
Country	Date	Format	Label
Worldwide	8 January 2015	Digital download	Republic
United Kingdom	8 January 2015	Digital download	Virgin
