= Premier Builders Guild =

- Founded: 2009
- Founders: Michael Bernstein, Founder Howard Swimmer, Founder
- Headquarters: 201 South Highland Ave. Pittsburgh, Pennsylvania, United States

The Premier Builders Guild was a Pennsylvania-based organization that assisted small manufacturers of boutique guitars and amplifiers in producing and marketing their products. The group was founded by Michael Bernstein and Howard Swimmer in 2009 in Arroyo Grande, California, and was brought to an end in 2016.

Brands associated with the guild include Fano Guitars, Tone King, Two-Rock Amplifiers, Gjika Amplification, and guitars by Gene Baker, Jason Z. Schroeder, Roger Giffin, Saul Koll, and Johan Gustavsson.
