= Bad (James Bay song) =

- "Live at Round Chapel, London" version

Single by James Bay

from the EP Oh My Messy Mind
- Released: 10 May 2019
- Length: 3:45
- Label: Republic
- Songwriter(s): James Bay; Dan Wilson
- Producer(s): James Bay; Dan Wilson

James Bay singles chronology
"Peer Pressure" (2019)	"Bad" (2019)	"Chew on My Heart" (2020)

"Bad" is a song by English singer-songwriter James Bay. The song was released by Republic Records on 10 May 2019, through digital download and streaming formats. In May 2019, Bay performed the track live on The Late Show with Stephen Colbert.

A live version was released on 7 June 2019

== Music video ==
The music video for "Bad" was directed by Martin Landgrave and released on 27 June 2019. In the clip, Bay is sitting on a chair, playing guitar, as he floats through New York City. He sings the lyrics as he travels from Central Park to Times Square.

== Track listing ==
- Digital download
1. "Bad" – 3:45
- Digital download
1. "Bad" (Live at Round Chapel, London) – 3:54

== Charts ==
Chart (2019)	Peak position
New Zealand Hot Singles (RMNZ)	14

== Certifications ==
Region	Certification	Certified units/sales
Brazil (Pro-Música Brasil)	Gold	20,000^{‡}
^{‡} Sales+streaming figures based on certification alone.
