= Leap (James Bay album) =

Studio album by James Bay
- Released: 8 July 2022
- Studio: Blackbird, Nashville; London
- Length: 43:40
- Label: Mercury; Republic
- Producer: Dave Cobb; Finneas; Gabe Simon; Ian Fitchuk; James Bay; Sacha Skarbek; Jon Green; Benjamin Rice; Afterhrs

James Bay chronology
Oh My Messy Mind (2019)	Leap (2022)	Changes All the Time (2024)

Singles from Leap
- 1. "Give Me the Reason" Released: 24 March 2022; 2. "One Life" Released: 13 May 2022; 3. "Everybody Needs Someone" Released: 24 June 2022; 4. "Save Your Love" Released: 8 July 2022

Professional ratings
Review scores
Source	Rating
The Arts Desk	3/5 stars
Clash	8/10
Evening Standard	3/5 stars
Gigwise	6/10 stars
NME	4/5 stars

Leap is the third studio album by English singer-songwriter James Bay, released on 8 July 2022 through Mercury and Republic Records. It was preceded by the singles "Give Me the Reason", "One Life" and "Everybody Needs Someone", and includes production and songwriting from Dave Cobb, Foy Vance, Ian Fitchuk, Joel Little and Finneas.

== Recording ==
The album was recorded "in a mixture of in person and remote sessions" in Nashville and London.

== Critical reception ==
Roy Sang of Clash described Leap as "a warm hug to those hankering to see the silver lining amidst the storms of life" and felt that it "exhibits a more unguarded side of Bay than seen previously as a successful attempt to augment his artistic palette". Ali Shutler of NME characterised the album as "a bold, self-assured collection of songs about satisfaction" and "very much a return to those breakout acoustic campfire songs" from earlier in his career, commenting that "Bay has never sounded so sure of himself", concluding that Leap is a "touching, delicate record that finally sees Bay entirely comfortable with who he is".

Reviewing the album for the Evening Standard David Smyth called the album a "retreat to the sounds that made [Bay] big in the first place", writing that "Too much of the rest stays in his comfort zone, mid-paced and melodic. He's back in the middle of the road, waiting to see if the masses will rejoin him." Joe Muggs of The Arts Desk found that the "woah-woahs and undeniable emotional gut punches are all there, so the album will do fine" and Bay's "talent" to be "absolutely undeniable", but in light of the "far rawer emotion" of artists like Sam Fender, wondered if Bay "might not be capable of something much more lastingly powerful if he punched through the homilies and got to something a bit more individualist".

== Commercial performance ==
Leap debuted at number four on the UK Albums Chart. At the midweek stage, Bay was 300 chart units ahead of the number two album.

== Track listing ==
Leap track listing
No.	Title	Writer(s)	Producer(s)	Length
1.	"Give Me the Reason"	James Bay; Foy Vance; Gabe Simon	Gabe Simon	3:54
2.	"Nowhere Left to Go"	Bay; Jacob Kasher Hindlin; Michael Pollack	Joel Little	3:24
3.	"Save Your Love"	Bay; Hindlin; Ammar Malik; Finneas O'Connell; John Ryan	Finneas; Benjamin Rice	3:23
4.	"Everybody Needs Someone"	Bay; James Murray; Mustafa Omer; Phil Plested	Dave Cobb	3:28
5.	"One Life"	Bay; Bianca Ghermezian; Ethan Gruska; Matt Morris; Stephen Wrabel; Steve Robson	Ian Fitchuk; Bay	3:25
6.	"Silent Love"	Bay; Jon Green; Sacha Skarbek	Jon Green; Sacha Skarbek; Bay	3:35
7.	"Love Don't Hate Me"	Bay; Jimmy Hogarth; Green	Cobb	3:27
8.	"Brilliant Still"	Bay; Jamie Scott; Jonny Coffer	Cobb	3:33
9.	"Right Now"	Bay; Ilsey Juber	Cobb; Bay	4:12
10.	"We Used to Shine"	Bay; Simon Aldred	Cobb	3:48
11.	"Endless Summer Nights"	Bay; Green; Paul Epworth	Cobb	3:29
12.	"Better"	Bay; Aldred	Bay	4:02
Total length:				43:40

Leap deluxe edition bonus tracks
No.	Title	Writer(s)	Producer(s)	Length
13.	"Chew on My Heart"	Bay; Andrew Haas; Ian Franzino; Ryan	Ryan; Afterhrs	3:15
14.	"One Life" (acoustic)	Bay; Ghermezian; Gruska; Morris; Wrabel; Robson	Fitchuk; Bay	3:19
15.	"Give Me the Reason" (stripped acoustic)	Bay; Vance; Simon	Simon	3:52
16.	"Chew on My Heart" (acoustic)	Bay; Haas; Franzino; Ryan	Green	3:17
Total length:				57:23

== Personnel ==
Musicians

- James Bay – vocals (all tracks), acoustic guitar (1, 3, 5, 6, 14–16), electric guitar (1, 2, 4, 5, 7–15), background vocals (4, 5, 7, 9–13), percussion (5, 16), keyboards (9), slide guitar (12), programming (13)
- Foy Vance – background vocals (1)
- Gabe Simon – background vocals, electric guitar, organ, percussion, piano, programming, synthesizer (1)
- Ian Fitchuk – drums (1), bass guitar (5, 14); acoustic guitar, background vocals, electric guitar, keyboards, programming (5); percussion (14)
- Alex Tomkins – piano (1)
- Josh Moore – programming (1, 5, 14)
- Joel Little – bass guitar, drum programming, keyboards (2)
- Finneas – drum programming, bass guitar, piano, synth bass, synthesizer (3)
- Lucy Smith – background vocals (4, 7, 8, 11)
- Brian Allen – bass guitar (4, 7, 8, 10, 11)
- Nate Smith – drums (4, 7–11), electronic percussion (7–10), percussion (8–10)
- Philip Towns – keyboards, synth bass (4, 8–11); piano (4, 7); Mellotron, synthesizer (7, 8, 10, 11)
- Dave Cobb – percussion (4, 7, 11), tom-toms (4, 11)
- Reuben James – Wurlitzer electric piano (5)
- Jon Green – background vocals, percussion (6, 16); electric guitar, keyboards, synthesizer (6); acoustic guitar, bass guitar, drums, piano, programming (16)
- Sacha Skarbek – background vocals, Mellotron, piano (6)
- Brennan Aerts – drum programming (9)
- Davide Rossi – strings (9)
- Andrew Haas – bass guitar, drums, electric guitar, keyboards, programming (13)
- Ian Franzino – drums, programming (13)
- John Ryan – background vocals, drums, electric guitar, keyboards, programming (13)
- Forest Miller – violin (13)
- Todd Lombardo – acoustic guitar (14)
- Mads Hauge – keyboards, percussion, programming (16)
- Jimmy Hogarth – percussion, programming (16)

Technical

- Bob Ludwig – mastering
- Mark "Spike" Stent – mixing (1, 3, 5–8, 10–12, 14)
- Serban Ghenea – mixing (2)
- Tom Elmhirst – mixing (4, 9, 13), engineering (13)
- Kolton Lee – mixing (15)
- Serge Courtois – mixing (16)
- Buckley Miller – engineering (1, 5, 14)
- Gabe Simon – engineering (1, 15)
- Henri Davies – engineering (1, 3, 12)
- Joel Little – engineering (2)
- John Hanes – engineering (2)
- Matt Wiggins – engineering (2)
- Darrell Thorp – engineering (4, 7–11)
- Marcus Locock – engineering (5, 14)
- Maximilian Von Ameln – engineering (6)
- Adam Lunn – engineering (9)
- Brennan Aerts – engineering (9)
- Afterhrs – engineering (13)
- John Ryan – engineering (13)
- Jimmy Hogarth – engineering (16)
- Josh Moore – editing (1, 5)
- Matt Wolach – mixing assistance (1, 3, 5–8, 10–12, 14)
- Bryce Bordone – mixing assistance (2)
- Matthew Scatchell – mixing assistance (13)
- Andrea Mastroiacovo – engineering assistance (1, 5, 14)
- Art Smith – engineering assistance (1, 2)
- Sean Badum – engineering assistance (1, 5, 14)
- Philip Smith – engineering assistance (4, 7–10)
- Gabrielle Stok – engineering assistance (13)
- Jeff Gunnell – engineering assistance (13)
- Nick Spencer – engineering assistance (13)
- Alex Tomkins – editing assistance (1, 15)

== Charts ==
Chart performance for Leap
Chart (2022)	Peak position
Australian Albums (ARIA)	64
German Albums (Offizielle Top 100)	36
Scottish Albums (OCC)	2
Swiss Albums (Schweizer Hitparade)	9
UK Albums (OCC)	4
US Top Album Sales (Billboard)	95
