= Oh My Messy Mind =

EP by James Bay
- Released: 10 May 2019
- Length: 12:57
- Label: Republic
- Producer: James Bay; Joel Little; Dan Wilson; Ariel Rechtshaid; Sacha Skarbek

James Bay chronology
Electric Light (2018)	Oh My Messy Mind (2019)	Leap (2022)

Singles from Oh My Messy Mind
- 1. "Peer Pressure" Released: 22 February 2019; 2. "Bad" Released: 10 May 2019

Oh My Messy Mind is an extended play by British singer-songwriter James Bay. The EP was released on 10 May 2019.

In a press release, Bay said "I wanted to be honest about some of my own stories and other stories I was being pulled into. I regularly write things down in a stream of consciousness to empty my head. Oh My Messy Mind is a line I wrote on a particularly dark day a little while ago. It seemed to reflect a weight that I felt I was carrying at the time, and that comes back now and again. The songwriting that followed was me looking for a release."

Bay promoted the EP with appearances on The Artist’s Den, The Late Show with Stephen Colbert, and Today.

== Critical reception ==
Mitch Mosk from Atwood Magazine called the EP "breathtaking" saying, "Though it's a bite-sized four tracks in length, the EP packs a serious punch in its assertion of James Bay's inimitable artistry."

== Track listing ==
Oh My Messy Mind track listing
No.	Title	Writer(s)	Length
1.	"Peer Pressure" (featuring Julia Michaels)	James Bay; Julia Michaels	2:55
2.	"Bad"	Bay; Dan Wilson	3:45
3.	"Rescue"	Bay; Ryan Tedder	2:54
4.	"Break My Heart Right"	Bay; Jon Green	3:23
Total length:			12:57

== Charts ==
Chart performance for Oh My Messy Mind
Chart (2019)	Peak position
Canadian Albums (Billboard)	59
