= Swimathon Foundation =

The Swimathon Foundation runs an annual fund raising swimathon which takes place at participating swimming pools across the UK. It is considered to be the world's largest swimming fund raising event.

The event has been run nationally every year since 1988 when it was originally sponsored by Penguin (chocolate biscuits) before being taken over by British Telecom for a number of years. Prior to that a London event sponsored by LBC was run in the autumn of 1986. Over the years, more than £10 million has been raised for worthwhile causes.

In its current configuration there are three separate challenges: Distance Challenge, SimplySwim and Corporate Challenge. For the Distance Challenge, individuals can choose to swim 5 km (3.1 mi), 2.5 km (1.6 mi) or 1.5 km (0.93 mi) or they can create a team of two to five people to swim 5 km (3.1 mi). The SimplySwim challenge allows individuals or teams to set their own targets for swimming any number of laps over any number of days up to and including the main event weekend. The event is open to all ages, with the youngest successful challenger to complete the 5 km feat being 6 years old (Leo Stuchbury - 1993) The Corporate Challenge is for teams of two to five swimmers who must complete 5 km (3.1 mi) as a team representing a company.

Duncan Goodhew has been involved in the Swimathon event for many years as a public figurehead to the fundraising campaign.
