= Electric Light (album) =

Studio album by James Bay
- Released: 18 May 2018
- Length: 48:26
- Label: Virgin EMI; Republic
- Producer: Paul Epworth; Jon Green

James Bay chronology
Chaos and the Calm (2014)	Electric Light (2018)	Oh My Messy Mind (2019)

Singles from Electric Light
- 1. "Wild Love" Released: 8 February 2018; 2. "Pink Lemonade" Released: 7 March 2018; 3. "Us" Released: 30 March 2018; 4. "Just for Tonight" Released: 10 August 2018

Electric Light is the second studio album by British singer-songwriter James Bay. The album was released on 18 May 2018 through Republic Records.

== Background ==
On 7 March 2018, Bay announced that his second album was called Electric Light and would be released on 18 May 2018. In a press release, he said: "If I had to describe my first album visually it would probably be a flame – while this new album is about a real sonic and artistic evolution for me. The feeling of a 100 watt bulb expanding and brightening is what I envisioned. Electric Light came to my mind and I knew it was perfect."

== Critical reception ==
Professional ratings
Aggregate scores
Source	Rating
Metacritic	71/100
Review scores
Source	Rating
AllMusic	4/5 stars
The A.V. Club	B
Clash	7/10
Cryptic Rock	3.5/5 stars
The Guardian	2/5 stars
The Independent	3/5 stars
MusicOMH	4/5 stars
NME	3/5 stars
Q Magazine	4/5 stars
Variety	Positive

At Metacritic, which assigns a normalised rating out of 100 to reviews from mainstream critics, the album has an average score of 71 based on 13 ratings, indicating "generally favorable reviews". Jordan Bassett of NME stated "'Electric Light' is all over the place. There are hip-hop style spoken-word skits on the record and, actually, it sometimes sounds more like a lush, exploratory mixtape than a coherent album." He rated the album 3/5. Q magazine was quoted as saying the album contains "an admirable desire for transformation." Stereogum wrote "It’s a genuinely thrilling piece of work, one that converted me into a James Bay fan on impact."

== Track listing ==
Standard edition
No.	Title	Writer(s)	Producer(s)	Length
1.	"Intro"	James Bay	Bay	0:58
2.	"Wasted on Each Other"	Bay; Jonathan Green	Bay; Green; Paul Epworth^{[b]}	3:58
3.	"Pink Lemonade"	Bay; Green	Bay; Green; Epworth^{[b]}	4:14
4.	"Wild Love"	Bay; Green	Bay; Green; Epworth^{[b]}	3:17
5.	"Us"	Bay; Green	Bay; Green; Epworth^{[b]}	3:01
6.	"In My Head"	Bay; Green	Bay; Green; Epworth^{[b]}	3:07
7.	"Interlude"	Bay	Bay	1:01
8.	"Just for Tonight"	Bay; Green	Bay; Green; Epworth^{[b]}	3:37
9.	"Wanderlust"	Bay; Green	Bay; Green^{[a]}; Epworth^{[a]}	4:16
10.	"I Found You"	Bay; James Napier	Bay; Green^{[a]}; Epworth^{[a]}	5:06
11.	"Sugar Drunk High"	Bay; Green	Bay; Green	3:39
12.	"Stand Up"	Bay; Green; Epworth	Bay; Green^{[a]}; Epworth^{[a]}	4:59
13.	"Fade Out"	Bay; Green	Bay; Green; Epworth^{[b]}	3:52
14.	"Slide"	Bay; Green; Allen Ginsberg	Bay; Green; Epworth^{[b]}	3:21
Total length:				48:26

Target exclusive edition (bonus tracks)
No.	Title	Writer(s)	Producer(s)	Length
15.	"Confirmation"	Bay; Green	Bay; Green	3:14
16.	"Young Hearts in the Dark"	Bay; Green	Bay; Green; Epworth^{[b]}	3:17
Total length:				54:59

Deluxe and Japanese edition bonus tracks
No.	Title	Length
15.	"Wild Love" (acoustic)	3:09
16.	"Pink Lemonade" (acoustic)	4:23
17.	"Us" (acoustic)	3:03
Total length:		59:04

Japanese edition bonus tracks
No.	Title	Writer(s)	Producer(s)	Length
18.	"Confirmation"	Bay; Green	Bay; Green	3:14
19.	"Young Hearts in the Dark"	Bay; Green	Bay; Green; Epworth^{[b]}	3:17
Total length:				65:43

Notes

- ^{^[a]} signifies a co-producer
- ^{^[b]} signifies an additional producer

== Personnel ==
Musicians

- Ashley Jones – spoken word (tracks 1, 7)
- Nick Selting – spoken word (tracks 1, 7)
- James Bay – lead vocals, background (tracks 2–6, 8–14); electric guitar (2–6, 8–13), drums (2–4, 6, 13), clapping (2, 5), acoustic guitar (5, 8, 9), piano (6), baritone guitar (9), percussion (10)
- Jon Green – background vocals (tracks 2–6, 8–14), bass guitar (2–6, 8, 9, 11–13), electric guitar (2, 4, 5, 8, 9), clapping (2, 5), keyboards (2–6, 8–13), drums (3, 5, 6, 8, 9, 11–13), piano (5, 6, 14), percussion (6, 8, 9, 12), drum programming (6), baritone guitar (9); acoustic guitar, sound effects (12)
- Paul Epworth – drum programming (tracks 2, 6, 10), synthesizer programming (2), keyboards (4, 12); percussion, programming (4); additional vocals, drums, finger clicking (10); synthesizer (13)
- Eddie Serafica – programming (tracks 3, 11), drum programming (3)
- Gerry Morgan – drums (tracks 5, 8)
- Davide Rossi – string arrangement, strings (tracks 5, 10, 12)
- Capital Children's Choir – vocals (track 6)
- Harry Edwards – programming (tracks 10, 13); bass guitar, synth bass (10); drum programming (12)
- David Ryan Harris – spoken word (track 14)

Technical

- Bob Ludwig – mastering
- Tom Elmhirst – mixing (tracks 2–6, 8–13)
- Matt Wiggins – mixing (track 14), engineering (2–6, 8–10, 12–14)
- Bryan Schlam – engineering (tracks 1, 7)
- Eddie Serafica – engineering (tracks 2–3, 5, 6, 9, 11–14)
- Paul Epworth – engineering (track 4)
- Jon Green – engineering (track 8)
- Brandon Bost – mixing assistance (tracks 2–6, 8–14)
- Luke Pickering – engineering assistance (tracks 2–6, 8–10, 12–14)
- Riley MacIntyre – engineering assistance (tracks 2–6, 8–10, 12–14)

Visuals

- James Bay – art direction
- Joe Spix – design
- Sarah Piantadosi – photography

== Charts ==
Chart (2018)	Peak position
Australian Albums (ARIA)	14
Austrian Albums (Ö3 Austria)	20
Belgian Albums (Ultratop Flanders)	24
Belgian Albums (Ultratop Wallonia)	81
Canadian Albums (Billboard)	14
Czech Albums (ČNS IFPI)	43
Dutch Albums (Album Top 100)	13
French Albums (SNEP)	156
German Albums (Offizielle Top 100)	14
Irish Albums (IRMA)	12
Italian Albums (FIMI)	75
Japanese Albums (Oricon)	140
New Zealand Albums (RMNZ)	21
Norwegian Albums (VG-lista)	25
Portuguese Albums (AFP)	22
Scottish Albums (OCC)	3
Spanish Albums (PROMUSICAE)	81
Swedish Albums (Sverigetopplistan)	26
Swiss Albums (Schweizer Hitparade)	6
UK Albums (OCC)	2
US Billboard 200	21

== Certifications ==
Region	Certification	Certified units/sales
New Zealand (RMNZ)	Gold	7,500^{‡}
United Kingdom (BPI)	Silver	60,000^{‡}
^{‡} Sales+streaming figures based on certification alone.
