= Changes All the Time =

Studio album by James Bay
- Released: 4 October 2024
- Length: 41:55
- Label: Mercury
- Producer: James Bay; Gabe Simon

James Bay chronology
Leap (2022)	Changes All the Time (2024)

Singles from Changes All the Time
- 1. "Up All Night" Released: 19 July 2024; 2. "Easy Distraction" Released: 30 August 2024

Singles from Changes All the Time (Deluxe Edition)
- 1. "Sunshine in the Room Up" Released: 31 January 2025; 2. "You and Me Time" Released: 18 April 2025

Changes All the Time is the fourth studio album by English singer-songwriter James Bay. It was released on 4 October 2024 by Mercury Records. It was preceded by the release of two singles: "Up All Night" and "Easy Distraction" on 19 July 2024 and 30 August 2024, respectively. The album was co-produced by Bay and Gabe Simon.

The album was originally scheduled to be released on 20 September 2024, but was pushed back by two weeks for unknown reasons.

A deluxe edition was released on 18 April 2025, featuring four new tracks.

== Track listing ==
Changes All the Time track listing
No.	Title	Writer(s)	Length
1.	"Up All Night" (with the Lumineers and Noah Kahan)	James Bay; Gabe Simon; Mark Broughton	3:23
2.	"Everburn"	Bay; Ollie Green	3:18
3.	"Hope"	Bay; Steve Robson; Bill Maybury	4:39
4.	"Easy Distraction"	Bay; Brandon Flowers; Ariel Rechtshaid; Tommy King	3:50
5.	"Speed Limit"	Bay; Natalie Hemby	4:02
6.	"Talk"	Bay; Simon	3:16
7.	"Hopeless Heart"	Bay; Jon Green; Jimmy Hogarth	3:22
8.	"Some People"	Bay; Dan Wilson; Simon	2:40
9.	"Go On"	Bay; David Hodges	4:10
10.	"Crystal Clear"	Bay; Kevin Garrett	3:29
11.	"Dogfight"	Bay; Holly Humberstone; Phil Plested	5:46
Total length:			41:55

Changes All the Time (Deluxe) track listing
No.	Title	Writer(s)	Length
12.	"The Elephant" (with Maggie Antone)	Bay; Humberstone	4:41
13.	"Latchkey Kid"	Bay; Hemby	3:49
14.	"Sunshine in the Room Up" (with Jon Batiste)	Bay; Jon Green	3:02
15.	"You and Me Time" (with Sheryl Crow)	Bay; Trent Dabbs; Jon Green	3:45

== Personnel ==
Musicians

- James Bay – lead vocals (all tracks), background vocals (tracks 1–7, 9–11), electric guitar (1–7, 9–11), acoustic guitar (1, 2, 4, 6–11), percussion (1), bass guitar (3, 5)
- Gabe Simon – background vocals (tracks 1–4, 6–9, 11), percussion (1–4, 6, 8, 9), acoustic guitar (1, 2, 4, 7), drums (1, 3–5), Moog bass (1, 4), bass guitar (1, 9, 10), piano (2, 3, 6, 11); lap steel guitar, mandolin (3); electric guitar, synthesizer (9); African percussion, glockenspiel (11)
- Mark Broughton – piano (tracks 1, 2, 4), Wurlitzer electric piano (5), keyboards (7), Hammond organ (9)
- The Lumineers – vocals, piano (track 1)
- Noah Kahan – vocals (track 1)
- Donovan Hepburn – percussion (tracks 2, 4, 6, 7, 9–11), drums (2, 6, 7, 9), background vocals (2, 11)
- Tom Peel – bass guitar (tracks 2, 4, 6, 7, 9, 11)
- Luke Bullard – electric guitar (tracks 2, 4, 6, 7, 9, 11), background vocals (4)
- Lucy Bay – background vocals (track 3), percussion (4), vocals (5)
- Reuben James – background vocals, Hammond organ, piano (track 3)
- Ada Bay – background vocals (track 3)
- Carrie Karpinen – drums (tracks 4, 9)
- June Simon – percussion (track 4), background vocals (11)

Technical

- James Bay – production
- Gabe Simon – production
- Ted Jensen – mastering
- Ryan Hewitt – mixing
- Mark Broughton – engineering
- Konrad Snyder – engineering (tracks 4, 9)
- Tyler Spratt – mixing assistance
- Liam Hebb – engineering assistance
- Tommy Bosustow – engineering assistance (track 3)
- Maddie Harmon – production coordination

== Charts ==
Chart performance for Changes All the Time
Chart (2024)	Peak position
Scottish Albums (OCC)	3
Swiss Albums (Schweizer Hitparade)	47
UK Albums (OCC)	4
