= Peer Pressure (James Bay song) =

Single by James Bay featuring Julia Michaels

from the EP Oh My Messy Mind
- Released: 22 February 2019
- Length: 2:56
- Label: Republic
- Songwriter(s): James Bay; Julia Michaels
- Producer(s): Joel Little

James Bay singles chronology
| "Just for Tonight" (2018) | "Peer Pressure" (2019) | "Bad" (2019) |

Julia Michaels singles chronology
| "Anxiety" (2019) | "Peer Pressure" (2019) | "What a Time" (2019) |

Music video
- "Peer Pressure" on YouTube

"Peer Pressure" is a song by English singer-songwriter James Bay, featuring vocals of American singer Julia Michaels. The song was released by Republic Records on 22 February 2019, through digital download and streaming formats. "Peer Pressure" was written by the two artists, and produced by New Zealand musician Joel Little.

== Music video ==
A music video to accompany the release of "Peer Pressure" was first premiered onto YouTube on 29 March 2019 at a total length of three minutes.

== Live performances ==
On 16 April 2019, Bay and Michaels performed the song for the first time on The Ellen DeGeneres Show.

== Charts ==
=== Weekly charts ===
| Chart (2019) | Peak position |
|---|---|
| Australia (ARIA) | 68 |
| Belgium (Ultratip Bubbling Under Flanders) | 38 |
| Ireland (IRMA) | 62 |
| Lithuania (AGATA) | 95 |
| New Zealand Hot Singles (RMNZ) | 4 |
| Scotland (OCC) | 42 |
| Sweden Heatseeker (Sverigetopplistan) | 6 |
| Switzerland (Schweizer Hitparade) | 88 |
| UK Singles (OCC) | 85 |
| US Adult Pop Airplay (Billboard) | 21 |
| US Hot Rock & Alternative Songs (Billboard) | 16 |

=== Year-end charts ===
| Chart (2019) | Position |
|---|---|
| US Hot Rock Songs (Billboard) | 68 |

== Certifications ==
| Region | Certification | Certified units/sales |
|---|---|---|
| Brazil (Pro-Música Brasil) | Gold | 20,000^{‡} |
| Canada (Music Canada) | Gold | 40,000^{‡} |
| Denmark (IFPI Danmark) | Gold | 45,000^{‡} |
| New Zealand (RMNZ) | Platinum | 30,000^{‡} |
| Portugal (AFP) | Platinum | 10,000^{‡} |
| Spain (PROMUSICAE) | Gold | 30,000^{‡} |
| United Kingdom (BPI) | Silver | 200,000^{‡} |
| United States (RIAA) | Gold | 500,000^{‡} |
^{‡} Sales+streaming figures based on certification alone.
