= Hold Back the River (James Bay song) =

2014 single by James Bay

Single by James Bay

from the album Chaos and the Calm and the EP Hold Back the River
- B-side: "Wait in Line" (CD)
- Released: 17 November 2014
- Recorded: 2013–2014
- Studio: Blackbird (Nashville, Tennessee)
- Genre: Indie rock; folk rock
- Length: 3:58
- Label: Republic
- Songwriters: Iain Archer; James Bay
- Producer: Jacquire King

James Bay singles chronology
"Let It Go" (2014)	"Hold Back the River" (2014)	"Scars" (2014)

Music video
- "Hold Back the River" by James Bay on YouTube

"Hold Back the River" is a song by English singer-songwriter James Bay. It was released on 17 November 2014 by Republic Records, part of Bay's EP also called Hold Back The River. The song was written by the Ivor Novello award winner Iain Archer with Bay and produced by Jacquire King. The song peaked at number 2 on the UK Singles Chart. It was nominated for a Grammy Award for Best Rock Song. The song was used in the movie The Space Between Us.

== Charts ==
=== Weekly charts ===
Chart (2014–2015)	Peak position
Australia (ARIA)	4
Austria (Ö3 Austria Top 40)	4
Belgium (Ultratop 50 Flanders)	7
Belgium (Ultratip Bubbling Under Wallonia)	3
Canada Hot 100 (Billboard)	56
Colombia (National-Report Top Rock)	2
Czech Republic Airplay (ČNS IFPI)	50
Czech Republic Singles Digital (ČNS IFPI)	19
Denmark (Tracklisten)	20
Euro Digital Song Sales (Billboard)	2
France (SNEP)	72
Germany (GfK)	4
Hungary (Rádiós Top 40)	27
Hungary (Single Top 40)	32
Hungary (Stream Top 40)	19
Ireland (IRMA)	1
Italy (FIMI)	7
Japan Hot 100 (Billboard)	76
Netherlands (Dutch Top 40)	14
Netherlands (Single Top 100)	12
New Zealand (Recorded Music NZ)	8
Norway (VG-lista)	24
Poland Airplay (ZPAV)	16
Scottish Singles Sales (Official Charts)	2
Slovakia Airplay (ČNS IFPI)	14
Slovakia Singles Digital (ČNS IFPI)	16
Slovenia (SloTop50)	5
Spain (Promusicae)	25
Sweden (Sverigetopplistan)	17
Switzerland (Schweizer Hitparade)	4
UK Singles (Official Charts)	2
US Bubbling Under Hot 100 Singles (Billboard)	1
US Adult Alternative Airplay (Billboard)	2
US Adult Pop Airplay (Billboard)	16
US Alternative Airplay (Billboard)	9
US Hot Rock & Alternative Songs (Billboard)	8
US Rock & Alternative Airplay (Billboard)	13

=== Year-end charts ===
Chart (2015)	Position
Australia (ARIA)	19
Austria (Ö3 Austria Top 40)	35
Belgium (Ultratop Flanders)	44
France (SNEP)	194
Germany (Official German Charts)	33
Italy (FIMI)	43
Netherlands (Dutch Top 40)	44
Netherlands (Single Top 100)	33
New Zealand (Recorded Music NZ)	24
Slovenia (SloTop50)	9
Sweden (Sverigetopplistan)	45
Switzerland (Schweizer Hitparade)	32
UK Singles (OCC)	8
US Hot Rock Songs (Billboard)	19

=== Decade-end charts ===
Chart (2010–2019)	Position
UK Singles (OCC)	64

== Certifications ==
Region	Certification	Certified units/sales
Australia (ARIA)	3× Platinum	210,000^{‡}
Austria (IFPI Austria)	Gold	15,000^{*}
Brazil (Pro-Música Brasil)	2× Platinum	120,000^{‡}
Canada (Music Canada)	4× Platinum	320,000^{‡}
Denmark (IFPI Danmark)	2× Platinum	180,000^{‡}
Germany (BVMI)	Platinum	600,000^{‡}
Italy (FIMI)	3× Platinum	150,000^{‡}
Netherlands (NVPI)	2× Platinum	60,000^{‡}
New Zealand (RMNZ)	4× Platinum	120,000^{‡}
Norway (IFPI Norway)	2× Platinum	20,000^{‡}
Portugal (AFP)	Gold	10,000^{‡}
Spain (Promusicae)	Gold	30,000^{‡}
Sweden (GLF)	3× Platinum	120,000^{‡}
Switzerland (IFPI Switzerland)	Gold	15,000^{‡}
United Kingdom (BPI)	5× Platinum	3,000,000^{‡}
United States (RIAA)	2× Platinum	2,000,000^{‡}
^{*} Sales figures based on certification alone.^{‡} Sales+streaming figures based on certification alone.

== Release history ==
Region	Date	Format	Label
United Kingdom	6 October 2014	Digital download	Republic
United States	3 March 2015	Modern rock radio	Republic
