= Tone King =

Guitar amplifier manufacturer

- A Tone King guitar amplifier
- Founded: 1993; 33 years ago in Kingston, New York
- Founder: Mark Bartel
- Headquarters: Baltimore, Maryland, United States
- Owner: Premier Builders Guild (until 2016); Boutique Amps Distribution (from 2016)
- Website: toneking.com

Tone King is a manufacturer of vacuum tube guitar amplifiers and stand-alone attenuators located in Baltimore, Maryland, U.S. Tone King was founded by Mark Bartel in 1993 in Kingston, New York, after studying vintage fender amplifiers with blues guitarist Ben Prevo. In 1994 Mark moved the company to Baltimore. Tone King is one of the boutique "vintage" amplifier companies making Fender style amps. Tone King was owned by the company Premier Builders Guild. In 2016, Premier Builders Guild went out of business and sold the Tone King brand to Boutique Amps Distribution, which now manufacturers these amps in Huntington Park, California.

In January 2016, Tone King introduced the new Royalist 45 Mk II amplifier, an updated version of Tone King's Royalist amplifier, known for its low-gain British sound qualities. That same month, Tone King introduced an updated version of its Ironman attenuator, the Ironman II Mini.

There are 4 different amplifiers in the current lineup that all feature the Ironman compensated reactive load attenuation: Gremlin Combo, Falcon Grande Combo, Imperial Head and Combo, Sky King.

== Critical acclaim ==
Of the Tone King Ironman II Mini attenuator, Guitar Player magazine reviewer Dave Hunter said this in a June 28, 2016 review: "The Ironman II Mini will go down to whisper-quiet, and sound reasonably good in the process, but the better test was in knocking off a reasonable 6dB to 9dB, at which levels I found it impressively accurate and unobtrusive."
