= Wild Love (James Bay song) =

2018 single by James Bay

Single by James Bay

from the album Electric Light
- Released: 8 February 2018
- Genre: Electropop; electronic rock
- Length: 3:17
- Label: Republic
- Songwriter(s): James Bay; Jonathan Green
- Producer(s): James Bay; Paul Epworth; Jon Green

James Bay singles chronology
"Running" (2016)	"Wild Love" (2018)	"Pink Lemonade" (2018)

"Wild Love" is a song recorded by English singer-songwriter James Bay, from his second studio album, Electric Light (2018). The song was released by Republic Records on 8 February 2018 as the lead single off the album. It reached number 39 on the UK Singles Chart on 16 February 2018. In 2020, the song was used by Virgin Media as hold music.

== Music video ==
A lyric video to accompany the release of "Wild Love" was first released onto YouTube on 8 February 2018, through James Bay's official YouTube account.

The official music video was directed by Marc Klasfeld and released on 19 February 2018. Natalia Dyer appears in the video.

== Track listing ==
Album version
No.	Title	Length
1.	"Wild Love"	3:17

Remixes
No.	Title	Length
1.	"Wild Love" (Jonas Blue remix)	3:25
2.	"Wild Love" (Kove remix)	3:13
3.	"Wild Love" (Shadow Child remix)	4:19

== Charts ==
=== Weekly charts ===
Chart (2018)	Peak position
Belgium (Ultratip Bubbling Under Flanders)	23
Belgium (Ultratip Bubbling Under Wallonia)	27
Ireland (IRMA)	75
New Zealand Heatseeker (RMNZ)	10
Sweden Heatseeker (Sverigetopplistan)	17
UK Singles (OCC)	39
US Adult Pop Airplay (Billboard)	17
US Hot Rock & Alternative Songs (Billboard)	11

=== Year-end charts ===
Chart (2018)	Position
US Hot Rock Songs (Billboard)	69

== Certifications ==
Certifications for "Wild Love"
Region	Certification	Certified units/sales
Brazil (Pro-Música Brasil)	Gold	20,000^{‡}
New Zealand (RMNZ)	Gold	15,000^{‡}
Portugal (AFP)	Gold	5,000^{‡}
United Kingdom (BPI)	Gold	400,000^{‡}
^{‡} Sales+streaming figures based on certification alone.

== Release history ==
Country	Date	Format	Version	Label	Ref.
Various	8 February 2018	Digital download, streaming	Album version	Republic	
Various	8 February 2018	Digital download, streaming	Remixes	Republic	
