= Chaos and the Calm =

Studio album by James Bay
- Released: 23 March 2015
- Recorded: 2013–2014
- Studio: Blackbird, The LBT (Nashville, Tennessee)
- Genre: Americana; indie rock; folk rock; blues; soul; soft rock; pop rock
- Length: 48:11
- Label: Republic
- Producer: Jacquire King

James Bay chronology
Chaos and the Calm (2015)	Electric Light (2018)

Singles from Chaos and the Calm
- 1. "Let It Go" Released: 15 September 2014; 2. "Hold Back the River" Released: 17 November 2014; 3. "Scars" Released: 28 August 2015; 4. "If You Ever Want to Be in Love" Released: 29 October 2015; 5. "Best Fake Smile" Released: 2 March 2016; 6. "Running" Released: 11 March 2016

Chaos and the Calm is the debut studio album by English singer-songwriter James Bay. It was first released on 23 March 2015 via Republic Records.

The album was nominated for a Grammy Award for Best Rock Album, while the song "Hold Back the River" was nominated for Best Rock Song and Bay for Best New Artist.

== Critical reception ==
Professional ratings
Aggregate scores
Source	Rating
Metacritic	58/100
Review scores
Source	Rating
AllMusic	3.5/5 stars
Clash	7/10
The Guardian	2/5 stars
PopMatters	6/10

Chaos and the Calm received mixed reviews from music critics. At Metacritic, which assigns a normalised rating out of 100 to reviews from mainstream critics, the album received an average score of 58, which indicates "mixed or average reviews", based on 9 reviews.

== Commercial performance ==
Chaos and the Calm debuted at number one on the UK Albums Chart on 29 March 2015, having sold over 64,000 copies in the first week of release.

== Track listing ==
Chaos and the Calm standard edition
No.	Title	Writer(s)	Producer(s)	Length
1.	"Craving"	James Bay; Iain Archer	Jacquire King	3:47
2.	"Hold Back the River"	Bay; Archer	King	3:59
3.	"Let It Go"	Bay; Paul Barry	King	4:21
4.	"If You Ever Want to Be in Love"	Bay; Jimmy Hogarth; Steve McEwan	King	3:58
5.	"Best Fake Smile"	Bay; Archer	King	3:26
6.	"When We Were on Fire"	Bay; Jon Green	King	3:59
7.	"Move Together"	Bay; Jamie Hartman	King	4:37
8.	"Scars"	Bay	King	4:32
9.	"Collide"	Bay; Kid Harpoon	King	3:24
10.	"Get Out While You Can"	Bay; Ed Harcourt	King	4:43
11.	"Need the Sun to Break"	Bay; Joel Pott	King	3:46
12.	"Incomplete"	Bay; Jake Gosling; Chris Leonard	King	3:41
Total length:				48:11

Chaos and the Calm deluxe version
No.	Title	Writer(s)	Producer(s)	Length
13.	"Running"	Bay	Bay	3:36
14.	"Clocks Go Forward"	Bay; Martin Brammer; Adam Argyle (adapter)	Green	4:10
15.	"Stealing Cars"	Bay; Green	Green	3:43
16.	"Scars" (live at iTunes Festival 2014; digital bonus track only)			4:43
Total length:				64:23

Chaos and the Calm deluxe edition – disc 2
No.	Title	Writer(s)	Producer(s)	Length
1.	"Move Together" (The Dark of the Morning Version)	Bay; Hartman	Green	4:45
2.	"Need the Sun to Break" (The Dark of the Morning Version)	Bay; Pott	Green	3:37
3.	"When We Were on Fire" (The Dark of the Morning Version)	Bay; Green	Green	3:59
4.	"Stealing Cars"	Bay; Green	Green	3:43
5.	"Clocks Go Forward"	Bay; Brammer	Green	4:10
6.	"Sparks"	Bay; Barry	Bay	3:07
7.	"Wait in Line"	Bay; Harpoon	Bay	4:00
8.	"Running"	Bay	Bay	3:36
9.	"Hear Your Heart"	Bay; Caitlyn Smith; Steve Robson	Robson	3:02
10.	"Heavy Handed"	Bay; Harcourt	Bay	3:29
Total length:				84:00

== Personnel ==
Musicians

- James Bay – lead vocals, background vocals, guitars, piano (4), bass (13), drums (13), keyboards (13)
- Eli Beaird – bass (1–12)
- Ian Fitchuk – keyboards (1–12), drums (1–12), percussion (2, 7, 8, 12)
- Eric Darken – percussion (1, 3–6, 9–11)
- Jonathan Yudkin – cello and viola (7)
- Gerry Morgan – drums and percussion (13)
- Jon Green – keyboards and vocals (14, 15)

Technical personnel

- Lowell Reynolds – engineer (1–12)
- Sean Badum – assistant engineer (1–12)
- James Oleksyk – assistant engineer (1–12)
- Michael H. Brauer – mixing (1–12)
- Mark Bengtson – mixing assistant and ProTools engineer (1–12)
- Bob Ludwig – mastering (1–12)
- Mark Bishop – engineer and mixing (13)
- Jon Green – engineer and mixing (14, 15)

== Charts and certifications ==
=== Weekly charts ===
Chart (2015–2017)	Peak position
Australian Albums (ARIA)	3
Austrian Albums (Ö3 Austria)	2
Belgian Albums (Ultratop Flanders)	10
Belgian Albums (Ultratop Wallonia)	34
Canadian Albums (Billboard)	4
Danish Albums (Hitlisten)	16
Dutch Albums (Album Top 100)	5
French Albums (SNEP)	37
German Albums (Offizielle Top 100)	3
Hungarian Albums (MAHASZ)	38
Irish Albums (IRMA)	1
Italian Albums (FIMI)	13
Latvian Albums (LaIPA)	64
New Zealand Albums (RMNZ)	6
Norwegian Albums (VG-lista)	12
Polish Albums (ZPAV)	46
Portuguese Albums (AFP)	22
Spanish Albums (Promusicae)	20
Swedish Albums (Sverigetopplistan)	6
Swiss Albums (Schweizer Hitparade)	1
UK Albums (OCC)	1
US Billboard 200	15
US Digital Albums (Billboard)	5
US Americana/Folk Albums (Billboard)	1
US Top Alternative Albums (Billboard)	2
US Top Rock Albums (Billboard)	3

=== Year-end charts ===
Chart (2015)	Position
Australian Albums (ARIA)	17
Belgian Albums (Ultratop Flanders)	101
Dutch Albums (Album Top 100)	37
German Albums (Offizielle Top 100)	44
New Zealand Albums (RMNZ)	28
Swedish Albums (Sverigetopplistan)	29
Swiss Albums (Schweizer Hitparade)	25
UK Albums (OCC)	8
US Billboard 200	167
US Folk Albums (Billboard)	12
US Top Rock Albums (Billboard)	49
Chart (2016)	Position
Canadian Albums (Billboard)	31
Danish Albums (Hitlisten)	42
Dutch Albums (MegaCharts)	37
Swedish Albums (Sverigetopplistan)	46
UK Albums (OCC)	19
US Billboard 200	59
US Top Rock Albums (Billboard)	18
Chart (2017)	Position
Danish Albums (Hitlisten)	66
Dutch Albums (MegaCharts)	77
Swedish Albums (Sverigetopplistan)	79
Chart (2019)	Position
Icelandic Albums (Plötutíóindi)	85

=== Decade-end charts ===
Chart (2010–2019)	Position
UK Albums (OCC)	68

== Certifications ==
Region	Certification	Certified units/sales
Australia (ARIA)	Gold	35,000^{^}
Austria (IFPI Austria)	Gold	7,500^{*}
Canada (Music Canada)	2× Platinum	160,000^{‡}
Denmark (IFPI Danmark)	3× Platinum	60,000^{‡}
Germany (BVMI)	Platinum	200,000^{‡}
Italy (FIMI)	Gold	25,000^{‡}
Mexico (AMPROFON)	Gold	30,000^{‡}
New Zealand (RMNZ)	2× Platinum	30,000^{‡}
Norway (IFPI Norway)	Gold	15,000^{‡}
Singapore (RIAS)	Gold	5,000^{*}
Sweden (GLF)	Gold	20,000^{‡}
Switzerland (IFPI Switzerland)	Gold	10,000^{^}
United Kingdom (BPI)	3× Platinum	824,540
United States (RIAA)	Platinum	1,000,000^{‡}
^{*} Sales figures based on certification alone.^{^} Shipments figures based on certification alone.^{‡} Sales+streaming figures based on certification alone.

== Release history ==
Region	Date	Format	Label
Ireland	20 March 2015	CD; digital download	Republic
United Kingdom	23 March 2015	CD; digital download	Republic
