= Let It Go (James Bay song) =

2014 single by James Bay

Single by James Bay

from the album Chaos and the Calm and the EP Let It Go
- Released: 15 September 2014
- Recorded: 2013–2014
- Studio: Blackbird (Nashville, Tennessee)
- Genre: Indie rock; soul; blues rock; soft rock
- Length: 4:21 (album version); 4:08 (international edit); 3:45 (radio mix)
- Label: Republic
- Songwriters: James Bay; Paul Barry
- Producer: Jacquire King

James Bay singles chronology
"Let It Go" (2014)	"Hold Back the River" (2014)

Music video
- "Let It Go" on YouTube

"Let It Go" is a song by English singer-songwriter James Bay. It was released in Europe on 15 September 2014 through Republic Records as the first single from Bay's second extended play of the same name. It was included on Bay's debut studio album Chaos and the Calm (2014). The song was written by Bay with Paul Barry and produced by Jacquire King. The Let It Go EP was released prior on 3 May 2014.

The song was re-released in March 2015 after "Hold Back the River" and peaked at number 10 on the UK Singles Chart in July 2015, beating its previous peak of 62 on 27 September 2014. In May 2015, "Let It Go" peaked at number 8 in Australia, whilst in New Zealand, the song debuted on 15 June 2015, at number 31, before climbing to number 24 the following week. A week after that, the song entered the top 10 of the chart, peaking at number 10. On 9 January 2016, the single debuted at number 98 on the Billboard Hot 100, becoming Bay’s first song to chart in the US. The single would eventually reach a peak of number 16 on 23 July 2016. A remix by Jack Steadman was released in 2015.

== Critical reception ==
Gregory Robson of AbsolutePunk called "Let It Go" a "rising current of despondency, heartache and powerhouse vocals" and "the clearest example of who exactly Bay is, that is, supple instrumentation, gauzy textures and that ageless croon".

== Charts ==
=== Weekly charts ===
Weekly chart performance for "Let It Go"
Chart (2014–2016)	Peak position
Australia (ARIA)	8
Austria (Ö3 Austria Top 40)	45
Belgium (Ultratip Bubbling Under Flanders)	23
Canada Hot 100 (Billboard)	37
France (SNEP)	55
Germany (GfK)	22
Ireland (IRMA)	21
Netherlands (Dutch Top 40)	18
Netherlands (Global Top 40)	39 (Note: The Global Top 40 chart debuted on the 29th week of 2016, "Let It Go"'s only week on the chart and close to the end of the song's charting period across the world.)
Netherlands (Single Top 100)	15
New Zealand (Recorded Music NZ)	10
Portugal (Official Chart AFP)	45
Sweden (Sverigetopplistan)	82
Switzerland (Schweizer Hitparade)	94
UK Singles (OCC)	10
US Billboard Hot 100	16
US Hot Rock & Alternative Songs (Billboard)	2
US Rock & Alternative Airplay (Billboard)	47
US Adult Alternative Airplay (Billboard)	15
US Adult Contemporary (Billboard)	12
US Adult Pop Airplay (Billboard)	5
US Alternative Airplay (Billboard)	39
US Pop Airplay (Billboard)	8

=== Year-end charts ===
2015 year-end chart performance for "Let It Go"
Chart (2015)	Position
Australia (ARIA)	35
Netherlands (Dutch Top 40)	39
Netherlands (Single Top 100)	26
New Zealand (Recorded Music NZ)	32
UK Singles (Official Charts Company)	41
US Hot Rock Songs (Billboard)	34

2016 year-end chart performance for "Let It Go"
Chart (2016)	Position
Canada (Canadian Hot 100)	75
Denmark (Tracklisten)	92
France (SNEP)	182
Netherlands (Global Top 40)	100
UK Singles (Official Charts Company)	99
US Billboard Hot 100	44
US Adult Contemporary (Billboard)	22
US Adult Top 40 (Billboard)	15
US Mainstream Top 40 (Billboard)	39
US Hot Rock Songs (Billboard)	4

=== Decade-end charts ===
Decade-end chart performance for "Let It Go"
Chart (2010–2019)	Position
UK Singles (Official Charts Company)	74

== Certifications ==
Certifications for "Let It Go"
Region	Certification	Certified units/sales
Australia (ARIA)	3× Platinum	210,000^{‡}
Belgium (BRMA)	Gold	10,000^{‡}
Brazil (Pro-Música Brasil)	2× Platinum	120,000^{‡}
Canada (Music Canada)	Diamond	800,000^{‡}
Denmark (IFPI Danmark)	3× Platinum	270,000^{‡}
Germany (BVMI)	Platinum	600,000^{‡}
Netherlands (NVPI)	Platinum	30,000^{‡}
New Zealand (RMNZ)	6× Platinum	180,000^{‡}
Norway (IFPI Norway)	Platinum	10,000^{‡}
Portugal (AFP)	2× Platinum	40,000^{‡}
Spain (Promusicae)	Platinum	60,000^{‡}
Sweden (GLF)	2× Platinum	80,000^{‡}
United Kingdom (BPI)	5× Platinum	3,000,000^{‡}
United States (RIAA)	7× Platinum	7,000,000^{‡}
^{‡} Sales+streaming figures based on certification alone.

== Release history ==
Region	Date	Format	Label	Catalogue no.
Europe	3 May 2014	Download (EP)	Republic	—
Europe	15 September 2014	Download (single)	Republic	00602547187154
United States	18 April 2015	CD (EP)	Republic	DNR22594-02
