= James Bay (singer) =

English singer-songwriter and guitarist (born 1990)

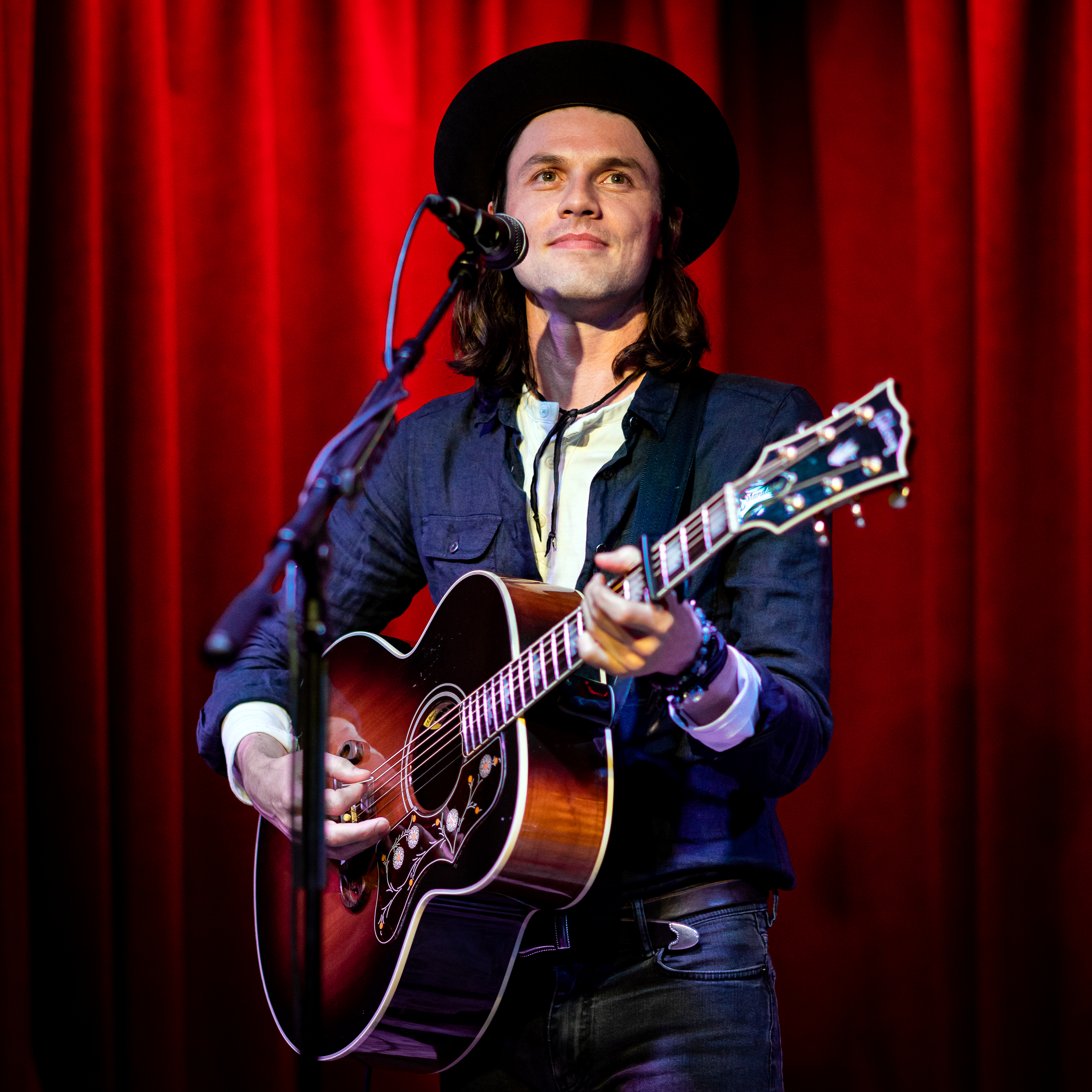
- Bay performing live in 2022

Background information
- Born: James Michael Bay; 4 September 1990 (age 35); Hitchin, Hertfordshire, England
- Genres: Rock; pop; soul; Americana
- Occupations: Singer-songwriter; guitarist
- Instruments: Vocals; guitar
- Years active: 2013–present
- Labels: Mercury; Republic
- Spouse: Lucy Smith (m. 2022)
- Children: 1
- Website: jamesbay.com

James Michael Bay (born 4 September 1990) is an English singer-songwriter and guitarist.

In 2014, he released his single "Hold Back the River", which was certified platinum, before releasing his debut studio album Chaos and the Calm (2015). The album went to number one in the UK and number 15 in the US. In February 2015, Bay received the Brit Awards "Critics' Choice" award. At the 2016 Brit Awards he received the award for Best British Male Solo Artist. Bay also received three nominations at the 2016 Grammy Awards, for Best New Artist, Best Rock Album, and Best Rock Song. In May 2018, he released his second studio album, Electric Light.

== Early life ==
James Bay was born to Jill, a former fashion illustrator for Marie Claire, and Nick Bay, a wine merchant. He has an older brother named Alex. Bay's parents brought him up in Hitchin, Hertfordshire where he attended Hitchin Boys' School. Aged 11, Bay was inspired to play classical guitar after hearing Eric Clapton's "Layla". He used an old rusty guitar with five strings he found in a cupboard in his house. Bay is a supporter of Newcastle United F.C.

When he moved to study in Brighton at the British and Irish Modern Music Institute seven years later at age 18 he played the city's open mic nights, on which he said, "That taught me a lot about writing and performing on my own and trying to hold my own". "I'm trying to make songs that make people feel something, and if I'm lucky, even move them".

Bay caught the attention of Republic Records A&R after a fan uploaded a video to YouTube of him performing at an open mic in London, and within a week, he signed to the label. His first EP, The Dark of the Morning, was released in 2013. Within a year, he was selling out his first UK headline tour.

== Career ==
=== 2013–2017: Career beginnings and Chaos and the Calm ===
Bay released his debut extended play, The Dark of the Morning, on 18 July 2013. His second EP, Let It Go, was released on 12 May 2014. The Let It Go EP debuted in the top 10 iTunes album chart and the lead single, titled "Let It Go", peaked at number 10 in the UK charts. Bay has performed live on the Burberry runway and has also recorded a Burberry Acoustic session. He toured with Hozier in 2014.

Bay recorded his entire debut studio album Chaos and the Calm at Blackbird Studio in Nashville, with producer Jacquire King. It debuted at number one in the UK charts and has been certified X2 platinum. His single "Hold Back the River" peaked at number 2 in the UK charts and was certified X3 platinum.

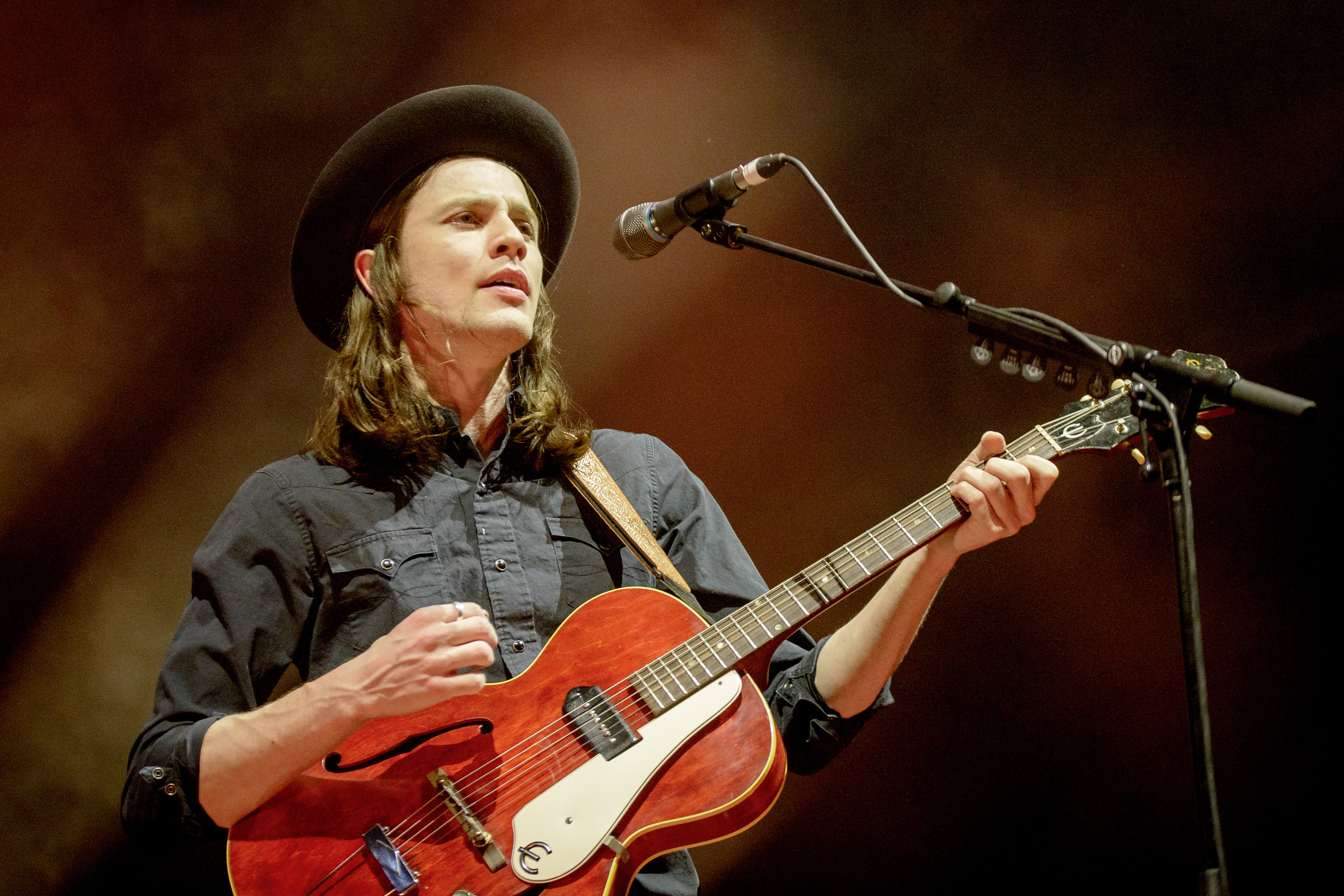
Bay performing in 2016

In January 2015, Bay released his fourth EP, Other Sides. He performed on the Pyramid Stage at Glastonbury Festival in June 2015. At the 2016 Brit Awards in London on 24 February, he received the award for Best British Male Solo Artist, and also performed "Love Yourself" with Justin Bieber at the ceremony. Bay recorded a cover of the Beatles song "Hey Bulldog" for the 2016 TV series Beat Bugs. He recorded a cover of the Tom Petty song "King's Highway" for the 2017 Disney/Pixar film Cars 3. It is heard in the film and is included on the official soundtrack album.

=== 2018–2019: Electric Light ===
Bay released his second studio album, Electric Light, on 18 May 2018. It peaked at number 2 on the UK Albums Chart and 21 on the US Billboard 200. The album has notable pop and R&B influences, and was noted for its "hip hop style spoken-word skits" during intervals. The lead single, "Wild Love", was released on 8 February 2018, and peaked at 39 on the UK Singles Chart and 17 on the US Adults Top 40. Bay released a duet version of the album's third single, "Us", performed on The Voice with Alicia Keys in May 2018. Bay released a single, "Peer Pressure", on 22 February 2019, featuring artist Julia Michaels. On 10 May 2019, he released his third EP, Oh My Messy Mind, the first record of his to be immediately released on streaming. On the same day, the single "Bad" was released.

=== 2020–present: Leap ===
In the spring of 2020, Bay began making his third studio album in Nashville at the historic RCA Studio A alongside producer Dave Cobb, and collaborated with Brandon Flowers of the Killers during recording. He released the single "Chew On My Heart" in July 2020. Later that month, he streamed a live performance in support of the #SaveOurVenues campaign, to support efforts against the economic threat posed to grassroots venues during the COVID-19 pandemic.

In April 2022, Republic Records relaunched Mercury Records with a new roster that includes James Bay. He released his third album, Leap, on 8 July 2022.

== Equipment ==
Bay endorses and plays Tone King amplifiers, a boutique amplifier brand of Premier Builders Guild. In 2017, he released his Epiphone Signature "1966" Century Outfit, an accurate recreation of his customized 1966 Epiphone Century guitar which has James Bay's "Hat Man" logo on the headstock and custom strap.

== Personal life ==
Bay has been in a relationship with music promoter Lucy Smith since he was 16 years old; they got married at a private ceremony in August 2022. They have a daughter named Ada Violet Bay who was born in October 2021.

== Discography ==
Studio albums

- Chaos and the Calm (2015)
- Electric Light (2018)
- Leap (2022)
- Changes All the Time (2024)

== Tours ==
=== Headlining ===
- Chaos and the Calm Tour (2015–16)
- Electric Light Tour (2018–2019)
- Leap Tour (2022-2023)
- Up All Night Tour (2025)

=== Opening act ===
- Toured with ZZ Ward and the Wild Feathers. North America (2013)
- Toured with Kodaline UK and Ireland (2013)
- Toured with Hozier North America (2014)
- Taylor Swift – 1989 World Tour (Europe) (2015)
- The Rolling Stones – No Filter Tour (2018)
- Ed Sheeran – ÷ Tour (Europe) (2019)
- The Lumineers – Brightside World Tour North America (2022–2023)
- Noah Kahan – The Stick Season Tour (2024)
- Bon Jovi - Forever Tour UK (2026)

== Awards and nominations ==
Year	Organisation	Award	Work	Result	Ref.
2015	Brit Awards	Critics' Choice	Himself	Won	
2015	MTV UK	Brand New for 2015	Himself	Nominated	
2015	BBC	BBC Sound of 2015	Himself	Nominated	
2015	MTV Video Music Awards	Artist to Watch	"Hold Back the River"	Nominated	
2015	MTV Europe Music Awards	Best New Act	Himself	Nominated	
2015	MTV Europe Music Awards	Best Push Act	Himself	Nominated	
2015	GQ Men of The Year	Breakthrough Solo Artist	Himself	Won	
2015	Q Awards	Best New Act	Himself	Won	
2016	Grammy Awards	Best New Artist	Himself	Nominated	
2016	Grammy Awards	Best Rock Album	Chaos and the Calm	Nominated	
2016	Grammy Awards	Best Rock Song	"Hold Back the River"	Nominated	
2016	BRIT Awards	British Breakthrough Act	Himself	Nominated	
2016	BRIT Awards	British Male Solo Artist	Himself	Won	
2016	BRIT Awards	British Single of the Year	"Hold Back the River"	Nominated	
2016	BRIT Awards	British Album of the Year	Chaos and the Calm	Nominated	
2016	Echo Music Prize	Best International Newcomer	Himself	Won	
2016	Ivor Novello Awards	Most Performed Work	"Hold Back the River"	Won	
2016	Q Awards	Best Solo Artist	Himself	Won	
2019	GAFFA-Prisen Awards	Best International Artist	Himself	Nominated	
2019	GAFFA-Prisen Awards	Best International Album	Electric Light	Nominated	
