= Kygo discography =

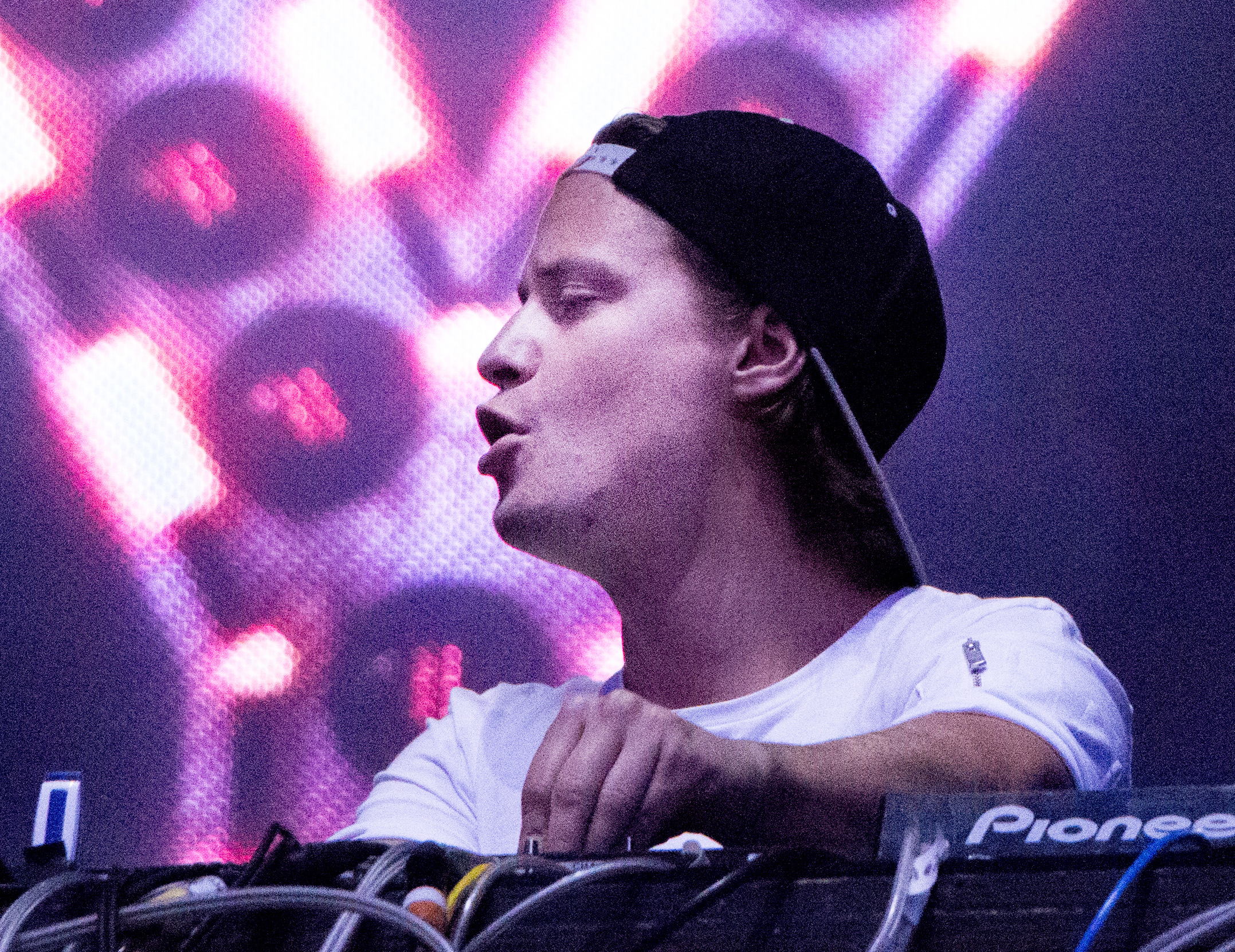
- Kygo in 2013
- Studio albums: 5
- EPs: 1
- Singles: 47
- Music videos: 29

Norwegian DJ and record producer Kygo has released five studio albums, one extended play, 47 singles, 8 promotional singles, 13 remixes and 29 music videos. According to Recording Industry Association of America (RIAA), Kygo has sold 10 million certified albums and singles in the US, including the multi-platinum hits "It Ain't Me" with Selena Gomez and "Higher Love" with Whitney Houston.

== Studio albums ==
List of studio albums, with selected details, chart positions and certifications
Title	Details	Peak chart positions										Certifications
Title	Details	NOR	AUS	BEL (FL)	FIN	GER	NLD	SWE	SWI	UK	US	Certifications
Cloud Nine	Released: 13 May 2016; Label: Sony; Formats: CD, digital download, LP	1	13	9	5	6	4	2	1	3	11	IFPI NOR: 9× Platinum; BPI: Gold; GLF: Platinum; NVPI: 2× Platinum; RIAA: Gold
Kids in Love	Released: 3 November 2017; Label: Sony; Formats: CD, digital download	3	42	68	14	91	22	3	34	35	73	BPI: Gold; IFPI SWI: Platinum; NVPI: Platinum
Golden Hour	Released: 29 May 2020; Label: Sony; Formats: CD, digital download	1	9	29	7	42	8	5	4	6	18	BPI: Silver; RIAA: Gold
Thrill of the Chase	Released: 11 November 2022; Label: Sony; Formats: CD, digital download	4	—	—	—	—	—	27	32	—	—	
Kygo	Released: 21 June 2024; Label: Sony; Formats: Digital download	1	—	105	33	86	49	20	7	62	97	
"—" denotes a recording that did not chart or was not released in that territory.

== Extended plays ==
List of extended plays, with selected details, chart positions and certifications
Title	Details	Peak chart positions			Certifications
Title	Details	AUS	SWE	US	Certifications
Stargazing	Released: 22 September 2017; Label: Sony, Ultra; Formats: Digital download	40	12	137	ARIA: Platinum; MC: Gold

== Singles ==
=== As lead artist ===
List of singles, with selected chart positions and certifications, showing year released and album name
Title	Year	Peak chart positions										Certifications	Album
Title	Year	NOR	AUS	AUT	BEL (FL)	CAN	GER	SWE	SWI	UK	US	Certifications	Album
"Epsilon"	2013	—	—	—	—	—	—	—	—	—	—		Non-album single
"Firestone" (featuring Conrad Sewell)	2014	1	10	5	4	64	3	2	4	8	92	IFPI NOR: 5× Platinum; ARIA: 4× Platinum; BEA: Platinum; BPI: 3× Platinum; BVMI: 2× Platinum; GLF: 5× Platinum; IFPI AUT: Gold; IFPI SWI: 3× Platinum; MC: 2× Platinum; RIAA: Platinum	Cloud Nine
"ID"	2015	31	—	—	—	—	—	83	76	—	—		Non-album single
"Stole the Show" (featuring Parson James)	2015	1	53	5	7	78	2	3	1	24	— (Note: "Stole the Show" did not enter the Billboard Hot 100, but peaked at number five on the Bubbling Under Hot 100 Singles chart.)	IFPI NOR: 6× Platinum; ARIA: Platinum; BEA: Platinum; BPI: Platinum; BVMI: Platinum; GLF: 5× Platinum; IFPI AUT: Gold; IFPI SWI: 3× Platinum; MC: 2× Platinum; RIAA: Platinum	Cloud Nine
"Nothing Left" (featuring Will Heard)	2015	1	69	58	57	—	57	14	26	79	—	IFPI NOR: 2× Platinum	Cloud Nine
"Here for You" (featuring Ella Henderson)	2015	9	99	58	50	—	47	16	17	18	—	IFPI NOR: Gold; ARIA: Gold; BPI: Silver	Non-album single
"Stay" (featuring Maty Noyes)	2015	2	67	30	2	59	38	3	11	20	— (Note: "Stay" did not enter the Billboard Hot 100, but peaked at number six on the Bubbling Under Hot 100 Singles chart.)	ARIA: Platinum; BEA: Platinum; BPI: Platinum; BVMI: Gold; GLF: 4× Platinum; IFPI SWI: Platinum; MC: 2× Platinum; RIAA: Gold	Cloud Nine
"Coming Over" (with Dillon Francis featuring James Hersey)	2016	—	—	—	—	—	—	93	—	—	—		This Mixtape Is Fire
"Raging" (featuring Kodaline)	2016	2	—	47	52	—	69	6	24	42	—	BPI: Silver; MC: Gold	Cloud Nine
"Carry Me" (featuring Julia Michaels)	2016	39	77	—	—	—	—	—	—	133	—	MC: Gold	Cloud Nine
"It Ain't Me" (Note: "It Ain't Me" appears on the Target deluxe edition of the Selena Gomez album Rare.) (with Selena Gomez)	2017	1	4	2	4	2	2	2	3	7	10	IFPI NOR: 7× Platinum; ARIA: 5× Platinum; BEA: 2× Platinum; BPI: 2× Platinum; BVMI: 2× Platinum; GLF: 7× Platinum; IFPI AUT: Platinum; IFPI SWI: 3× Platinum; MC: 9× Platinum; RIAA: 3× Platinum	Stargazing
"First Time" (with Ellie Goulding)	2017	3	29	23	51	26	28	6	14	34	67	ARIA: Platinum; BPI: Gold; BVMI: Gold; GLF: 3× Platinum; IFPI AUT: Gold; IFPI SWI: Platinum; MC: 2× Platinum; RIAA: Gold	Stargazing
"Stargazing" (featuring Justin Jesso)	2017	2	— (Note: The sales of the song "Stargazing" counted towards the placement of the EP on the singles chart in Australia.)	18	32	53	14	8	9	44	—	ARIA: Platinum; BEA: Gold; BPI: Silver; BVMI: Platinum; GLF: 2× Platinum; IFPI AUT: Platinum; IFPI SWI: 2× Platinum; MC: 2× Platinum; RIAA: Gold	Stargazing
"Kids in Love" (featuring the Night Game)	2017	8	94	52	60	73	90	19	33	99	— (Note: "Kids in Love" did not enter the Billboard Hot 100, but peaked at number 22 on the Bubbling Under Hot 100 Singles chart.)	GLF: Platinum	Kids in Love
"Stranger Things" (featuring OneRepublic)	2018	—	—	—	—	—	—	56	48	—	—	MC: Platinum	Kids in Love
"Remind Me to Forget" (featuring Miguel)	2018	2	14	4	8	35	14	3	2	69	63	ARIA: 2× Platinum; BEA: Gold; BPI: Silver; BVMI: Gold; GLF: 4× Platinum; IFPI AUT: Gold; IFPI SWI: Platinum; MC: 4× Platinum	Kids in Love
"Born to Be Yours" (with Imagine Dragons)	2018	4	18	12	41	31	22	4	5	54	74	ARIA: 2× Platinum; BPI: Silver; IFPI AUT: Gold; IFPI SWI: Platinum; MC: 3× Platinum	Origins
"Happy Now" (featuring Sandro Cavazza)	2018	6	50	53	26	—	53	3	20	—	—	ARIA: Gold; BEA: Gold; BPI: Silver; BVMI: Gold; GLF: 3× Platinum; IFPI SWI: Gold	Non-album single
"Think About You" (featuring Valerie Broussard)	2019	5	—	61	53	74	67	12	32	82	— (Note: "Think About You" did not enter the Billboard Hot 100, but peaked at number 19 on the Bubbling Under Hot 100 Singles chart.)	MC: Platinum	Golden Hour (Japanese Edition)
"Carry On" (Note: "Carry On" was released as a standalone single for the 2019 film, Pokémon Detective Pikachu.) (with Rita Ora)	2019	8	43	47	40	61	46	14	28	26	—	ARIA: Gold; BPI: Gold; IFPI SWI: Gold; MC: Gold	Golden Hour (Japanese Edition)
"Not OK" (with Chelsea Cutler)	2019	7	99	—	—	—	—	27	47	—	—		Golden Hour (Japanese Edition)
"Kem kan eg ringe" (featuring Store P and Lars Vaular)	2019	3	—	—	—	—	—	—	—	—	—		Non-album single
"Higher Love" (with Whitney Houston)	2019	2	20	20	4	22	22	9	10	2	63	ARIA: 3× Platinum; BEA: Platinum; BPI: 3× Platinum; BVMI: Platinum; IFPI AUT: Platinum; IFPI SWI: Platinum; MC: 2× Platinum; RIAA: 2× Platinum	Golden Hour
"Family" (with The Chainsmokers)	2019	31	—	—	52	—	—	60	51	—	—		World War Joy
"Forever Yours (Tribute)" (with Avicii and Sandro Cavazza)	2020	5	96	—	58	—	65	4	25	—	—		Non-album single
"Like It Is" (with Zara Larsson and Tyga)	2020	3	78	37	47	—	41	4	9	49	— (Note: "Like It Is" did not enter the Billboard Hot 100, but peaked at number 13 on the Bubbling Under Hot 100 Singles chart.)	IFPI NOR: Platinum; BPI: Silver; MC: Platinum	Golden Hour
"I'll Wait" (with Sasha Sloan)	2020	9	—	71	—	—	89	28	21	—	— (Note: "I'll Wait" did not enter the Billboard Hot 100, but peaked at number seven on the Bubbling Under Hot 100 Singles chart.)	MC: Platinum; RIAA: Gold	Golden Hour
"Freedom" (featuring Zak Abel)	2020	11	—	51	—	83	90	23	25	77	—	IFPI AUT: Gold	Golden Hour
"Lose Somebody" (Note: "Lose Somebody" also features on the deluxe edition of OneRepublic's fifth studio album, Human.) (with OneRepublic)	2020	5	31	28	40	45	45	12	20	46	88	ARIA: Platinum; BPI: Gold; IFPI AUT: Platinum; IFPI SWI: Gold; MC: 2× Platinum; RIAA: Platinum	Golden Hour
"The Truth" (with Valerie Broussard)	2020	28	—	—	—	—	—	61	63	—	—		Golden Hour
"Broken Glass" (with Kim Petras)	2020	15	—	—	—	95	—	34	78	—	—		Golden Hour
"What's Love Got to Do with It" (with Tina Turner)	2020	4	95	23	42	52	26	—	6	31	— (Note: "What's Love Got to Do with It" did not enter the Billboard Hot 100, but peaked at number one on the Bubbling Under Hot 100 Singles chart.)	BPI: Silver; BVMI: Gold; IFPI AUT: Platinum; IFPI SWI: Gold; MC: Gold	Non-album singles
"Hot Stuff" (with Donna Summer)	2020	23	—	—	—	—	74	—	27	—	—		Non-album singles
"Gone Are the Days" (with James Gillespie)	2021	7	—	—	85	—	—	21	62	—	—	GLF: Gold	Thrill of the Chase
"Love Me Now" (featuring Zoe Wees)	2021	5	—	62	—	73	69	17	28	—	—	GLF: Platinum; IFPI AUT: Gold	Thrill of the Chase
"Undeniable" (featuring X Ambassadors)	2021	8	—	—	—	—	—	41	55	—	—		Thrill of the Chase
"Dancing Feet" (featuring DNCE)	2022	8	—	—	35	68	—	33	60	—	— (Note: "Dancing Feet" did not enter the Billboard Hot 100, but peaked at number 16 on the Bubbling Under Hot 100 Singles chart.)	GLF: Gold; IFPI AUT: Gold	Thrill of the Chase
"Freeze"	2022	37	—	—	—	—	—	— (Note: "Freeze" did not enter the Swedish Singellista Chart, but peaked at number eight on the Swedish Heatseeker Chart.)	—	—	—		Thrill of the Chase
"Never Really Loved Me" (with Dean Lewis)	2022	14	—	—	—	—	—	16	100	—	—	GLF: Gold	Thrill of the Chase
"Lost Without You" (with Dean Lewis)	2022	—	—	—	40	—	—	66	—	—	—		Thrill of the Chase
"Woke Up in Love" (with Gryffin and Calum Scott)	2022	26	—	—	38	87	—	27	42	—	—	GLF: Gold	Thrill of the Chase and Alive
"Say Say Say" (with Paul McCartney and Michael Jackson)	2023	16	—	—	—	—	—	41	—	—	—		Non-album single
"Whatever" (with Ava Max)	2024	1	— (Note: "Whatever" did not enter the Australian Singles Chart but peaked at number eight on the ARIA Top 20 Dance Singles Chart.)	20	20	54	15	9	15	15	— (Note: "Whatever" did not enter the Billboard Hot 100, but peaked at number one on the Bubbling Under Hot 100 Singles chart.)	BEA: Platinum; BPI: Platinum; BVMI: Gold; GLF: Platinum; IFPI AUT: Platinum; IFPI SWI: Platinum; MC: Platinum; RIAA: Gold	Kygo
"For Life" (with Zak Abel and Nile Rodgers)	2024	24	—	—	22	—	—	27	75	75	—	BEA: Gold	Kygo
"Without You" (with Hayla)	2024	—	—	—	—	—	—	—	—	—	—		Kygo
"Me Before You" (with Plested)	2024	39	—	—	—	—	—	67	—	—	—		Kygo
"Stars Will Align" (with Imagine Dragons)	2024	24	—	—	26	—	—	58	51	69	—		Non-album singles
"Hold on Me" (with Sandro Cavazza)	2024	25	—	—	—	—	—	49	—	—	—		Non-album singles
"Chasing Paradise" (with OneRepublic)	2025	—	—	—	23	—	91	48	76	—	—		Non-album singles
"Can't Get Enough" (with Victoria Nadine)	2025	16	—	—	—	—	—	—	—	—	—		Non-album singles
"Save My Love" (with Khalid and Gryffin)	2026	48	—	—	16	—	—	78	—	—	—		TBA
"That's When You Know" (with Carter Faith)	2026	—	—	—	—	—	—	— (Note: "That's When You Know" did not enter the Swedish Singellista Chart, but peaked at number 7 on the Swedish Heatseeker Chart.)	—	—	—		TBA
"Heaven On Your Mind" (featuring Dan Tyminski)	2026	60	—	—	—	—	—	90	—	—	—		TBA
"Take Me Back" (with Max McNown)	2026	36	—	—	15	—	—	42	—	—	—		TBA
"Before You Know It" (with Ava Max)	2026	40	—	—	27	—	—	67	—	—	—		TBA
"—" denotes a recording that did not chart or was not released in that territory.

=== Promotional singles ===
List of promotional singles, with selected chart positions, showing year released and album name
Title	Year	Peak chart positions									Album
Title	Year	NOR	AUS	AUT	GER	NLD	SWE	SWI	UK	US Dance	Album
"Fragile" (with Labrinth)	2016	1	74	69	87	78	55	50	109	—	Cloud Nine
"I'm in Love" (featuring James Vincent McMorrow)	2016	9	—	38	—	—	65	39	99	—	Cloud Nine
"Never Let You Go" (featuring John Newman)	2017	39	—	—	—	—	81	64	—	19	Kids in Love
"Sunrise" (featuring Jason Walker)	2017	37	—	—	—	—	—	—	—	33	Kids in Love
"Riding Shotgun" (with Oliver Nelson featuring Bonnie McKee)	2017	—	—	—	—	—	—	—	—	27	Kids in Love
"With You" (featuring Wrabel)	2017	—	—	—	—	—	—	—	—	47	Kids in Love
"Permanent" (featuring JHart)	2017	—	—	—	—	—	—	—	—	49	Kids in Love
"I See You" (featuring Billy Raffoul)	2017	—	—	—	—	—	—	—	—	44	Kids in Love
"—" denotes a recording that did not chart or was not released in that territory.

== Other charted songs ==
List of other charted songs, with selected chart positions, showing year released and album name
Title	Year	Peak chart positions					Album/EP
Title	Year	NOR	CZE Air.	SWE	SWI	US Dance	Album/EP
"Fiction" (featuring Tom Odell)	2016	—	—	62	—	27	Cloud Nine
"Happy Birthday" (featuring John Legend)	2016	—	—	94	—	23	Cloud Nine
"Oasis" (featuring Foxes)	2016	29	—	— (Note: "Oasis" did not enter the Swedish Singles Chart, but peaked at number 17 on the Swedish Heatseeker chart.)	—	19	Cloud Nine
"Not Alone" (featuring Rhodes)	2016	—	—	—	—	31	Cloud Nine
"Serious" (featuring Matt Corby)	2016	—	—	—	—	32	Cloud Nine
"For What It's Worth" (featuring Angus & Julia Stone)	2016	—	—	— (Note: "For What It's Worth" did not enter the Swedish Singles Chart, but peaked at number 16 on the Swedish Heatseeker chart.)	—	— (Note: "For What It's Worth" did not enter the Hot Dance/Electronic Songs chart, but peaked at number 45 on the Dance/Electronic Digital Song Sales chart.)	Cloud Nine
"Cruise" (featuring Andrew Jackson)	2017	25	—	—	—	22	Fifty Shades Darker
"This Town" (featuring Sasha Sloan)	2017	9	—	— (Note: "This Town" did not enter the Sverigetopplistan singles chart, but peaked at number nine on the Sverigetopplistan Heatseeker chart.)	99	— (Note: "This Town" did not enter the Hot Dance/Electronic Songs chart, but peaked at number seven on the Dance/Electronic Digital Song Sales chart.)	Stargazing
"Someday" (with Zac Brown)	2020	—	—	—	—	25	Golden Hour
"Feels Like Forever" (with Jamie N Commons)	2020	—	—	—	—	27	Golden Hour
"Beautiful" (with Sandro Cavazza)	2020	—	—	—	—	29	Golden Hour
"Could You Love Me" (with Dreamlab)	2020	—	—	—	—	30	Golden Hour
"To Die For" (with St. Lundi)	2020	—	—	—	—	31	Golden Hour
"How Would I Know" (with Oh Wonder)	2020	—	—	—	—	33	Golden Hour
"Don't Give Up on Love" (with Sam Tinnesz)	2020	—	—	—	—	35	Golden Hour
"Say You Will" (with Patrick Droney and Petey)	2020	—	—	—	—	36	Golden Hour
"Follow" (with Joe Janiak)	2020	—	—	—	—	38	Golden Hour
"Hurting" (with Rhys Lewis)	2020	—	—	—	—	39	Golden Hour
"The Way We Were" (featuring Plested)	2022	24	—	— (Note: "The Way We Were" did not enter the Swedish Singellista Chart, but peaked at number four on the Swedish Heatseeker Chart.)	—	18	Thrill of the Chase
"Lonely Together" (featuring Dagny)	2022	—	—	—	—	50	Thrill of the Chase
"Healing (Shattered Heart)" (with Jonas Brothers)	2024	—	—	—	—	16	Kygo
"Louder" (with Julia Michaels and Chance Peña)	2024	—	14	—	—	—	Kygo
"—" denotes a recording that did not chart or was not released in that territory.

== Guest appearances ==
List of non-single guest appearances, with other performing artists, showing year released and album name
Title	Year	Other artist(s)	Album
"Cruise"	2017	Andrew Jackson	Fifty Shades Darker

== Remixes ==
=== Record label release ===
List of remixes, with selected chart positions and certifications, showing original artisits, year released and album name
Title	Original artist	Year	Peak chart positions						Album
Title	Original artist	Year	NOR	AUT	BEL (FL)	NLD	SWE	UK	Album
"Dancer" (Kygo Remix)	Didrik Thulin	2013	—	—	—	—	—	—	Non-album single
"Younger" (Kygo Remix)	Seinabo Sey	2014	1	54	32	25	14	61	Pretend
"Cut Your Teeth" (Kygo Remix)	Kyla La Grange	2014	39	—	—	21	50	—	Non-album singles
"Miami 82" (Kygo Remix)	Syn Cole (featuring Madame Buttons)	2014	—	—	—	—	—	—	Non-album singles
"Shine" (Kygo Remix)	Benjamin Francis Leftwich	2014	—	—	—	—	—	—	Non-album singles
"Often" (Kygo Remix)	The Weeknd	2014	12	—	—	—	—	—	Non-album singles
"Midnight" (Kygo Remix)	Coldplay	2014	—	—	—	—	—	—	Non-album singles
"Sexual Healing" (Kygo Remix)	Marvin Gaye	2015	23	—	67	75	57	—	Non-album singles
"Take On Me" (Kygo Remix)	A-ha	2015	—	—	—	—	—	—	Time and Again: The Ultimate a-ha
"Starboy" (Kygo Remix)	The Weeknd (featuring Daft Punk)	2016	—	—	—	—	—	—	Starboy (Target Exclusive)
"Tired" (Kygo Remix)	Alan Walker (featuring Gavin James)	2017	—	—	—	—	—	—	Non-album singles
"Electric Feel" (Kygo Remix)	Henry Green	2017	—	—	—	—	—	—	Non-album singles
"You're the Best Thing About Me" (Kygo Remix)	U2	2017	—	—	—	—	—	—	Songs of Experience (Deluxe Edition)
"Let Somebody Go" (Kygo Remix)	Coldplay (with Selena Gomez)	2022	—	—	—	—	—	—	Non-album singles
"Kygo Jo" (Kygo Remix)	Flow Kingz (featuring Lyng)	2026	1	65	—	—	3	—	Non-album singles
"—" denotes a recording that did not chart or was not released in that territory.

=== Published remixes ===
List of remixes, showing original artist, year released and streaming platform
Title	Original artist	Year	Platform
"Time" (Kygo Remix)	Chase & Status (featuring Delilah)	2011	YouTube
"I Don't Like You" (Kygo Remix) (Note: Remixes later made unavailable from Kygo's first official YouTube channel.)	Eva Simons	2012	YouTube
"Born to Die" (Kygo Remix)	Lana Del Rey	2012	YouTube
"Good Time" (Kygo Remix)	Owl City and Carly Rae Jepsen	2012	YouTube
"Stay" (Kygo Edit)	Rihanna (featuring Mikky Ekko)	2013	YouTube
"The Wilhelm Scream" (Kygo Remix)	James Blake	2013	SoundCloud
"Limit to Your Love" (Kygo Remix)	James Blake	2013	SoundCloud
"Let Her Go" (Kygo Remix)	Passenger	2013	YouTube
"Caravan" (Kygo Remix)	Passenger	2013	SoundCloud; YouTube
"Brother" (Kygo Edit)	Matt Corby	2013	SoundCloud
"Resolution" (Kygo Edit)	Matt Corby	2013	SoundCloud; YouTube
"Jolene" (Kygo Edit)	Dolly Parton	2013	SoundCloud
"Angels" (Kygo Edit)	The xx	2013	SoundCloud
"No Diggity" versus "Thrift Shop" (Kygo Remix) * Made as a mashup	Ed Sheeran, Passenger and Macklemore & Ryan Lewis	2013	SoundCloud; YouTube
"Can't Afford It All" (Kygo Remix)	Jakubi	2013	SoundCloud; YouTube
"Electric Feel" (Kygo Remix) * Pre-label release only	Henry Green	2013	SoundCloud; YouTube
"High for This" (Kygo Remix)	Ellie Goulding	2013	SoundCloud; YouTube
"Sexual Healing" (Kygo Remix) * Pre-label release only	Marvin Gaye	2013	SoundCloud; YouTube
"I See Fire" (Kygo Remix)	Ed Sheeran	2013	SoundCloud
"Wait" (Kygo Remix)	M83	2014	SoundCloud
"Dirty Paws" (Kygo Remix)	Of Monsters and Men	2014	SoundCloud

== Music videos ==
List of music videos as lead artist, with directors, showing year released
Title	Year	Director(s)	Ref.
"Firestone" (featuring Conrad Sewell)	2015	Jon Jon Augustavo	
"Stole the Show" (featuring Parson James)	2015	Saman Kesh	
"Here for You" (featuring Ella Henderson)	2015	Michael Maxxis	
"Stay" (featuring Maty Noyes)	2016	Jason Beattie	
"Coming Over" (with Dillon Francis featuring James Hersey)	2016	Mister Whitmore	
"I'm in Love" (featuring James Vincent McMorrow)	2016	Ariel Elia	
"Raging" (featuring Kodaline)	2016	Ariel Elia	
"Carry Me" (featuring Julia Michaels)	2016	—N/a	
"It Ain't Me" (with Selena Gomez)	2017	Phillip R. Lopez	
"First Time" (with Ellie Goulding)	2017	Mathew Cullen	
"Stargazing" (featuring Justin Jesso)	2017	Phillip R. Lopez	
"Stranger Things" (featuring OneRepublic)	2018	Tim Mattia	
"Remind Me to Forget" (with Miguel)	2018	Colin Tilley	
"Born To Be Yours" (with Imagine Dragons)	2018	Matt Eastin; Aaron Hymes	
"Happy Now" (featuring Sandro Cavazza)	2018	Colin Tilley; Johannes Lovund	
"Think About You" (featuring Valerie Broussard)	2019	Sarah Bahbah	
"Carry On" (with Rita Ora)	2019	Jonathan Singer-Vine	
"Not Ok" (with Chelsea Cutler)	2019	Sarah Bahbah	
"Higher Love" (with Whitney Houston)	2019	Hannah Lux Davis	
"Family" (with The Chainsmokers)	2019	Jeremiah Davis	
"Like It Is" (with Zara Larsson and Tyga)	2020	Connor Brashier	
"Freedom" (with Zak Abel)	2020	Johannes Lovund	
"Lose Somebody" (with OneRepublic)	2020	Christian Lamb	
"Broken Glass" (with Kim Petras)	2020	Griffin Stoddard	
"What's Love Got To Do With It" (with Tina Turner)	2020	Sarah Bahbah	
"Hot Stuff" (with Donna Summer)	2020	Bo Webb	
"Love Me Now" (featuring Zoe Wees)	2021	Johannes Lovund	
"Dancing Feet" (featuring DNCE)	2022	Johannes Lovund	
"Freeze"	2022	Rafatoon	
"Lost Without You" (with Dean Lewis)	2022	Johannes Lovund	

== Production and songwriting credits ==
List of production and songwriting credits, showing original artists, year released and album name
Title	Year	Artist(s)	Album	Credit(s)	Written with:	Produced with:
"Write On Me"	2016	Fifth Harmony	7/27	Co-writer/Producer	Mikkel Eriksen, Tor Hermansen, Priscilla Hamilton, Simon Wilcox	Stargate
"Squeeze"	2016	Fifth Harmony	7/27	Co-writer/Producer	Mikkel Eriksen, Tor Hermansen, Nolan Lambroza, Priscilla Hamilton, Simon Wilcox	Stargate
"Didn't I"	2020	OneRepublic	Human	Co-writer	Ryan Tedder, Brent Kutzle, Zach Skelton, James Abrahart	—N/a
"The Astronaut"	2022	Jin of BTS	—N/a	Co-writer/Producer	Guy Berryman, Jonny Buckland, Will Champion, Chris Martin, Jin, Joan La Barbara, Jóhann Jóhannsson, Moses Martin	Bill Rahko
