= Golden Hour (Kygo album) =

2020 studio album by Kygo

Studio album by Kygo
- Released: 29 May 2020
- Recorded: 2018–2020
- Genre: Tropical house
- Length: 60:47
- Label: Sony Music
- Producers: Kygo; Scott Harris; Lawrie Martin; Petey Martin; Narada Michael Walden; The Gifted; Nicholas Furlong; Daniel James; Leah Haywood

Kygo chronology
Kids in Love (2017)	Golden Hour (2020)	Thrill of the Chase (2022)

Singles from Golden Hour
- 1. "Higher Love" Released: 28 June 2019; 2. "Like It Is" Released: 27 March 2020; 3. "I'll Wait" Released: 3 April 2020; 4. "Freedom" Released: 17 April 2020; 5. "Lose Somebody" Released: 15 May 2020; 6. "The Truth" Released: 22 May 2020; 7. "Broken Glass" Released: 28 May 2020

Golden Hour is the third studio album by Norwegian tropical house DJ and record producer Kygo. It was released on 29 May 2020 by Sony Music.

== Background ==
In June 2018, Kygo announced a collaboration with American rock band Imagine Dragons titled "Born to Be Yours". The single was released on 11 June. It streamed 362 million times on Spotify and 120 million times on YouTube, as of 2 January 2020. On 21 September, Kygo debuted his upcoming single, "Happy Now", during his set at the iHeartRadio Music Festival held at the T-Mobile Arena. The single is a collaboration with Sandro Cavazza. On 24 October, Kygo posted a clip from the single's music video on his social media account. The single was released on 26 October. It streamed 109 million times on YouTube and 330 million times on Spotify, as of 2 January 2020

In October 2018, Kygo and his manager, Myles Shear, partnered with Sony Music Entertainment and launched the Palm Tree Records label. Palm Tree Records aims to be a platform for up-and-coming artists.

"Think About You" featuring American singer Valerie Broussard. It was released as a single on 14 February 2019, and considered timed for Valentine's Day.

"Carry On" is a song with English singer Rita Ora, released as a standalone single for the 2019 film Detective Pikachu. The song was released on 19 April 2019 through RCA Records. It has streamed 174 million times on Spotify.

On 23 May 2019, Kygo released "Not OK" with American singer Chelsea Cutler. As of 2 January 2020 its YouTube video has 72 million views and on Spotify the song has been streamed over 69 million times.

On 14 June 2019, Kygo released his first Norwegian-language song, with Bergen rappers Store P and Lars Vaular called "Kem kan eg ringe".

On 28 June 2019, Kygo remixed Whitney Houston's cover version of Steve Winwood's song "Higher Love". On 21 August 2019, "Higher Love" reached No. 1 position on Billboard magazine's Dance Club Songs chart, making it Houston's highest-charting posthumous release to date. "Higher Love" has been streamed over 917 million times on Spotify as of 7 April 2024.

On 6 December 2019, Kygo collaborated with the Chainsmokers on a track, named "Family".

On 20 January Kygo, via his socials, teased an unreleased Avicii track known as "Forever Yours". This track was first played by Avicii at Ultra Music Festival 2016 but never completed during his lifetime, so Kygo gave his tropical touches to the song after Sandro Cavazza, his fellow collaborator, sent him the track, and with due consent from Avicii's family. The track was released on 24 January 2020.

On 23 March 2020, Kygo announced via his social media that he had completed his third album titled Golden Hour. He then released the single "Like It Is", with Zara Larsson and Tyga, on 27 March 2020.

On 2 April 2020, Kygo released "I'll Wait" with vocals by Sasha Sloan. The next day, a music video was released starring real-life American couple Rob Gronkowski and Camille Kostek containing personal footage of their life together. On 16 April 2020, Kygo collaborated with Moroccan-English singer Zak Abel on a track titled "Freedom".

On 11 May 2020, Kygo officially announced the track list for the Golden Hour album. On 15 May 2020, he released another track, with OneRepublic, titled "Lose Somebody", along with the pre-order for the album. Kygo released the sixth and final single from the album, "The Truth", featuring Valerie Broussard (with whom he previously collaborated on "Think About You"), on 22 May 2020.

== Track listing ==
Golden Hour track listing
No.	Title	Writer(s)	Producer(s)	Length
1.	"The Truth" (with Valerie Broussard)	Kyrre Gørvell-Dahll; Lena Leon; Valerie Broussard	Kygo	3:13
2.	"Lose Somebody" (with OneRepublic)	Gørvell-Dahll; Philip Plested; Ryan Tedder; Jacob Torrey; Morten Ristorp Jensen; Alexander Delicata; Alysa Vanderheym	Kygo	3:19
3.	"Feels Like Forever" (with Jamie N Commons)	Gørvell-Dahll; Jamie N Commons; Elias Caparis; Nicholas Petricca; Kevin Rey; Sean Waugaman; Eli Maiman; Benjamin Berger; Ryan McMahon	Kygo	3:37
4.	"Freedom" (with Zak Abel)	Gørvell-Dahll; Sandro Cavazza; Zak Zilesnik; Lawrie Martin	Kygo; Lawrie Martin	3:20
5.	"Beautiful" (with Sandro Cavazza)	Gørvell-Dahll; Cavazza; Johan Lindbrandt	Kygo	3:37
6.	"To Die For" (with St. Lundi)	Gørvell-Dahll; Dermot Kennedy; Tom Martin; Brad Mair; Archie Langley; Jamie Scott	Kygo; Tom Martin	3:50
7.	"Broken Glass" (with Kim Petras)	Gørvell-Dahll; Chloe Angelides; Kim Petras; Fran Hall; Lukasz Gottwald; Aaron Joseph; Sam Sumser; Sean Small	Kygo; Chloe Angelides	3:23
8.	"How Would I Know" (with Oh Wonder)	Gørvell-Dahll; Jaymes Young; Lindsey Stirling; Patrick Martin	Kygo; Petey Martin	3:00
9.	"Could You Love Me" (with Dreamlab)	Gørvell-Dahll; Daniel James	Kygo; Dreamlab^{[v]}	3:22
10.	"Higher Love" (with Whitney Houston)	Steve Winwood; William Jennings	Kygo; Narada Michael Walden	3:50
11.	"I'll Wait" (with Sasha Sloan)	Gørvell-Dahll; Sasha Sloan; Scott Harris	Kygo; Scott Harris	3:35
12.	"Don't Give Up on Love" (with Sam Tinnesz)	Gørvell-Dahll; Broussard; Samuel Anton Tinnesz; James Bairian; Louis Castle	Kygo; The Gifted	3:09
13.	"Say You Will" (with Patrick Droney and Petey)	Gørvell-Dahll; Patrick Droney; Nick Furlong; Petey Martin	Kygo; P. Martin	3:27
14.	"Follow" (with Joe Janiak)	Gørvell-Dahll; Joe Janiak; Sean Douglas; P. Martin	Kygo; P. Martin	2:55
15.	"Like It Is" (with Zara Larsson and Tyga)	Gørvell-Dahll; Dua Lipa; Nick Hodgson; Gez O'Connell; Zara Larsson; P. Martin; Michael Stevenson	Kygo; P. Martin	3:01
16.	"Someday" (with Zac Brown)	Gørvell-Dahll; Petricca; Furlong	Kygo; Furlong	3:43
17.	"Hurting" (with Rhys Lewis)	Gørvell-Dahll; Ryan Hennessy; Jimmy Rainsford; Jayson DeZuzio; Jonny Price	Kygo	3:06
18.	"Only Us" (with Haux)	Gørvell-Dahll; Woodson Black; P. Martin	Kygo; P. Martin	3:22
Total length:				60:47

Golden Hour – Japanese edition bonus tracks
No.	Title	Writer(s)	Producer(s)	Length
19.	"Carry On" (with Rita Ora)	Gorvell-Dahll; Natalie Dunn; Ilan Kidron; Afshin Salmani; Rita Ora	Kygo; AFSHeeN; Josh Cumbee	3:39
20.	"Not OK" (with Chelsea Cutler)	Gorvell-Dahll; Chelsea Cutler; Leah Haywood; James; David Brook; Robert Ellmore	Kygo; Dreamlab; Ruffian	3:30
21.	"Think About You" (featuring Valerie Broussard)	Gorvell-Dahll; Broussard; Aaron Espe; P. Martin	Kygo; P. Martin	3:29
Total length:				71:25

Notes

- ^{^[c]} signifies a co-producer
- ^{^[v]} signifies a vocal producer

== Charts ==
=== Weekly charts ===
Chart performance for Golden Hour
Chart (2020)	Peak position
Australian Albums (ARIA)	9
Austrian Albums (Ö3 Austria)	20
Belgian Albums (Ultratop Flanders)	29
Belgian Albums (Ultratop Wallonia)	52
Canadian Albums (Billboard)	2
Czech Albums (ČNS IFPI)	95
Danish Albums (Hitlisten)	15
Dutch Albums (Album Top 100)	8
Finnish Albums (Suomen virallinen lista)	7
French Albums (SNEP)	34
German Albums (Offizielle Top 100)	42
Irish Albums (Official Charts)	7
Italian Albums (FIMI)	30
Japan Hot Albums (Billboard)	34
Japanese Albums (Oricon)	30
New Zealand Albums (RMNZ)	11
Norwegian Albums (VG-lista)	1
Scottish Albums (Official Charts)	18
Slovak Albums (ČNS IFPI)	46
Spanish Albums (Promusicae)	56
Swedish Albums (Sverigetopplistan)	5
Swiss Albums (Schweizer Hitparade)	4
UK Albums (Official Charts)	6
UK Dance Albums (Official Charts)	2
US Billboard 200	18
US Top Dance Albums (Billboard)	2

=== Year-end charts ===
2020 year-end chart performance for Golden Hour
Chart (2020)	Position
Swedish Albums (Sverigetopplistan)	100
US Top Dance/Electronic Albums (Billboard)	5

2021 year-end chart performance for Golden Hour
Chart (2021)	Position
Norwegian Albums (VG-lista)	19
US Top Dance/Electronic Albums (Billboard)	6

== Certifications ==
Certifications for Golden Hour
Region	Certification	Certified units/sales
Canada (Music Canada)	Platinum	80,000^{‡}
Denmark (IFPI Danmark)	Gold	10,000^{‡}
Italy (FIMI)	Gold	25,000^{‡}
New Zealand (RMNZ)	Platinum	15,000^{‡}
Poland (ZPAV)	Gold	10,000^{‡}
United Kingdom (BPI)	Silver	60,000^{‡}
United States (RIAA)	Gold	500,000^{‡}
^{‡} Sales+streaming figures based on certification alone.
