= LCCM =

LCCM may refer to:

- La Consolacion College Manila
- London College of Creative Media, formerly London Centre of Contemporary Music
- Theory of Lexical Concepts and Cognitive Models, in the LCCM Theory of Vyvyan Evans
