= Sarah Bahbah =

Palestinian visual artist and director

- "Piano 3" from the series "3eib!"; a 2021 self-portrait of artist Sarah Bahbah.
- Born: December 1991 (age 34); Perth, Australia
- Education: Curtin University
- Known for: Visual art, film direction, cinematic photography, immersive set design
- Notable work: Sex and Takeout, I Could Not Protect Her, 3eib!, Dear Love
- Website: sarahbahbah.com

Sarah Bahbah is a Palestinian visual artist and director based in Los Angeles, and the creator of the genre-bending hybrid documentary–cinema series Can I Come In?. She has collaborated with global brands including Gucci, Valentino Beauty, Spotify, Condé Nast, Capitol Records and Sony Music, while her directorial work and art series have amassed over 100 million views online. Her most pivotal bodies of work include 3eib! (Shame On Me!) and Fool Me Twice, which confront sexual liberation, cultural repression, and attachment psychology with unflinching emotional intimacy.

Bahbah often captions her images using subtitles, with the resulting image resembling a film still. VICE has described Bahbah's photos as "optimized for the Internet". The New York Times has also profiled her viral photographic series in a feature examining its reflection of contemporary emotional life, while Dazed has highlighted her captioned stills as emblematic of digital intimacy, vulnerability, and heartbreak. She has photographed many young celebrities such as Noah Centineo, Dylan Sprouse, and Alisha Boe.

== Style and influences ==
A photograph from Bahbah's 2021 series "Fool Me Twice", featuring actor Noah Centineo. This piece demonstrates Bahbah's use of captions on her photographs, and her retro-saturation technique.

Bahbah studied creative advertising at Curtin University in Western Australia. During her first year of studies, she began photographing music festivals and cultural events, including Firefly. Writing for Forbes, interviewer Olivia Perez posited that this experience "capturing intimate, private moments within the human experience and bringing them to light" carried forward into her later artwork.

Bahbah places subtitles on her photographs to simulate the appearance of a still from a captioned film. She adopted this style with Instagram in mind, after being inspired by posts on the platform sharing screenshots from subtitled foreign films. Bahbah described her works as coming together to "create a serial, episodic quasi-narrative" which is open to interpretation, although "[each] individual piece tells a story on its own". She uses vivid saturation to create a retro colour palette.

Her art is driven by the desire to "create a space where [she] belong[s], a space that [she] could own". She has expressed that the themes of desire, intimacy, and emotion in her work, and her frequent depiction of taboo subjects such as women's sexuality, stem from the sense of freedom she has gained through her art after being raised in a conservative Christian Middle Eastern household, as a racial minority in a majority-white community. She has also mentioned that her art, and particularly her writing, helps her to manage her OCD and anxiety.

== Career ==
=== "Sex and Takeout" ===
"Sex and Takeout — Pizza", the best–known photograph from Bahbah's 2015 "Sex and Takeout" series.

The series "Sex and Takeout" was created in 2014 while Bahbah was working as an art director at a Melbourne advertising agency. The 26-photograph series features young women in varying states of nudity eating and posing with fast food. The series went viral and Bahbah gained over 50,000 Instagram followers overnight. The images in the series were shared millions of times. In 2019, Bahbah announced that prints of one of her most famous photographs from the series ("Sex and Takeout — Pizza", pictured right), which had previously been available only as an expensive limited-edition print, would be temporarily available at a more affordable price in an effort to "democratize art acquisition".

=== Possy Agency ===
Bahbah established her own creative agency, Possy, in 2016. Through Possy, she has worked with GQ and Vogue, shot ad campaigns for Gucci, and directed three music videos for Kygo songs ("Think About You" with Valerie Broussard and "Not OK" with Chelsea Cutler in 2019, and a remix of "What's Love Got to Do with It" starring Laura Harrier in July 2020).

=== "I Could Not Protect Her" ===
"I Could Not Protect Her" is a visual poem released in 2018 unpacking the artist's trauma from childhood sexual abuse. The photos present the conflicting sentiments felt by the subject; subtitles convey a simultaneous desire for approval from the abuser and a strong detest for his actions. To accompany the final post in the series, Bahbah conducted an Instagram livestream wherein she read aloud the poem she had written as part of the series. The poem concludes, "I could not protect her, because I could not protect myself."

In an interview following the launch of this series with Teen Vogue, Bahbah spoke about how being silenced as a child informs her current work:

As a child, I was constantly dismissed. The disregard for my existence raised me into an apathetic adult- completely disassociated from my emotions. It was only until my trauma resurfaced that I understood that my work had become a projection of my childhood. Through my art I had begun to manifest freedom. My sole intent in my work and my being is to practice transparency of my emotions, and to express, express, express, as for so long I didn't have a voice. Through my art I'm creating a safe space for expression for myself, and in doing so, I hope to empower others to do the same.

=== "3eib!" ===
In 2020, Bahbah released a series titled "3eib!" (pronounced "ay-ab"), a term meaning "shame" in Arabic (the series is titled "Shame on Me!" in English). The self-portrait series is the first to feature Bahbah in front of the camera, and the first series in which the photos' subtitles are written in both English and Arabic. The series touches on the same themes of empowerment, self-love, and desire as many of Bahbah's other works, but this time specifically centred around the experiences of Arab women. She chose the title "3eib" to preemptively reclaim the word, which she realized would be leveraged against her in "the Arab world" as a result of the series.

=== "Fool Me Twice" ===
Le projet de Sarah Bahbah, «Fool Me Twice», réalisé avec le soutien de WePresent, est une série photographique explorant la complexité de l'attirance entre individus, s'interrogeant sur les raisons de notre attirance pour les personnes qui nous attirent. Le projet met en vedette Noah Centineo, le petit ami d'Internet, et Alisha Boe, la star de 13 Reasons Why sur Netflix. Il suit l'histoire d'amour d'un couple inspirée par des événements vécus par la photographe elle-même.

=== "Can I Come In" ===
In June 2025, she launched Can I Come In?, a six-part "podcast-cinema-documentary hybrid" series released on YouTube in partnership with WeTransfer's arts platform WePresent. Each episode centres on one of six women - Mia Khalifa, Cindy Kimberly, Nemahsis, Liza Soberano, Banks and Yesly Dimate.

== Controversies ==
In 2016, Bahbah's collaboration with Butter, a fried chicken restaurant in Sydney, drew criticism for its display of Bahbah's images of nude women throughout the dining area and on the restaurant's website. Although the restaurant and Bahbah came out in defence of the photographs, with Bahbah explaining her intent to portray female empowerment, some patrons found the restaurant's theming degrading.

In 2018, singer Selena Gomez was accused of copying Bahbah's visual style without credit in her music video "Back to You". Bahbah's official response acknowledged that she does not own the use of subtitles on images, but claimed that her "recognizable style of work" has made her the ""go-to for this type of style" as an "industry standard". She further stated that she was "flattered that so many have referenced me in Selena's latest work" and that she was disappointed that the accusations had "overshadowed" her recent work shining a light on child sexual abuse. Gomez never responded to the accusations.
