= Broken Glass (Kygo and Kim Petras song) =

2020 song by Kygo & Kim Petras

Single by Kygo and Kim Petras

from the album Golden Hour
- Released: 28 May 2020
- Genre: Tropical house
- Length: 3:23
- Label: Sony Music
- Songwriters: Kyrre Gørvell-Dahll; Chloe Angelides; Kim Petras; Fran Hall; Dr. Luke; Aaron Joseph; Sam Sumser; Sean Small
- Producers: Kygo; Chloe Angelides

Kygo singles chronology
"The Truth" (2020)	"Broken Glass" (2020)	"What's Love Got to Do with It" (2020)

Kim Petras singles chronology
"Malibu" (2020)	"Broken Glass" (2020)	"Future Starts Now" (2021)

Music video
- "Broken Glass" on YouTube

"Broken Glass" is a song by Norwegian DJ Kygo and German singer Kim Petras. It was released on 28 May 2020 by Sony Music from Kygo's third studio album, Golden Hour (2020). The song became a top 40 hit in Norway and Sweden.

== Music video ==
The music video was released on July 10, 2020, directed by Griffin Stoddard. Petras is shown amongst the wreckage of a car in the snowy dark, with her appearance evolving into a "Mad Max-meets-Elsa from Frozen ice queen, ready to take on everything the storm has to throw at her", according to Billboard.

== Charts ==
=== Weekly charts ===
Chart performance of "Broken Glass"
Chart (2020)	Peak position
Canada Hot 100 (Billboard)	96
Norway (VG-lista)	15
Sweden (Sverigetopplistan)	34
Switzerland (Schweizer Hitparade)	78
US Hot Dance/Electronic Songs (Billboard)	13

=== Year-end charts ===
Year-end chart performance of "Broken Glass"
Chart (2020)	Position
US Hot Dance/Electronic Songs (Billboard)	44
