= Scoundrels (band) =

British blues rock band

- Origin: London, England
- Genres: Blues rock, Alternative rock
- Years active: 2008–present
- Label: Blue Horizon
- Members: George Elliot; Alex "Billy" Hill; Joshua Martens; Ned Wyndham
- Past members: Adam Callan
- Website: scoundrels.fm

Scoundrels are a blues-rock band from London. They were originally formed in 2007 but the current line-up was completed in 2009. The band were signed by the original founders of Sire Records, legendary A&R man Seymour Stein and producer/songwriter Richard Gottehrer, to the revived Blue Horizon label. They were the first UK signing to the label. Their début album Scoundrels was released on 27 June 2011. Their second single, "Loud n Proud", reached the top of the 5FM "Buzz Chart" in South Africa which led to a feature in Heat Magazine South Africa.

== History ==
Ned Wyndham, Alex 'Billy' Hill and Josh Martens shared a love of 50's soul, roots, doo-wop, and classic rock, which led them all to the London Centre of Contemporary Music. During their college years, they were able to hone their skills, putting on rootsy nights at Notting Hill Arts Club and The Troubadour. They recruited the final member of their band, George Elliot, after original guitarist, Adam Callan, left in the Summer of 2009.

Their début album was recorded at an extended stay in Louisiana, where the band lived on a houseboat moored on the swamps at McGee's Landing Henderson, Louisiana, recording with Swamp Pop legend C.C. Adcock as well as in Chicago with Steve Albini, where they recorded at his own Electrical Audio studio.

The Sniff It Up EP was their first release for the Blue Horizon label, which featured five tracks selected from the forthcoming album. The band toured in support of the release in the UK with fellow Brit-blues-rockers Kill It Kid. They then took a residency at London's famous Ronnie Scott's Jazz Club, which ran throughout the summer of 2011.

Scoundrels played numerous UK festivals over the summer of 2011, including a main stage slot at Jamie Oliver's inaugural Big Feastival. In October 2011, they were invited to support The Kooks on their UK tour. Later that month they travelled back to the United States to play at college radio festival CMJ.

== Band members ==
- George Elliot – lead guitar, backing vocals
- Alex "Billy" Hill – bass guitar
- Joshua Martens – drums
- Ned Wyndham – lead vocals, rhythm guitar

== Discography ==
=== Albums/EPs ===
- Sniff It Up EP (2011)
- Scoundrels (2011)
- "Sexy Weekend EP" (2012)
- "Music From The Arch" (2020)

=== Singles ===
- "Gulf Of Mexico" (2011)
- "Loud n Proud" (2011)
