= Alex Delicata =

American producer, songwriter, multi-instrumentalist, audio engineer

Alexander Joseph Delicata
- Musical career
- Genres: pop; country; hip-hop; R&B
- Occupations: Producer; songwriter; multi-instrumentalist; audio engineer
- Years active: 2007–present
- Label: BMI / Warner Chappell Music

Alex Delicata is an American songwriter, producer, and multi-instrumentalist, best known for co-writing Kygo & OneRepublic's "Lose Somebody", Rihanna's "California King Bed", Beyoncé's "Daddy Lessons" and Meek Mill's "All Eyes on You". A frequent collaborator of production teams The Monarch and The Runners, many of Delicata's documented musical contributions have begun with informal, impromptu guitar sessions to formulate potential melodies and lyrical themes. He has also worked with Rita Ora, MGK, Hunter Hayes, and Lil Wayne, among others.

== Songwriting, instrumental and production credits ==
Credits are courtesy of Discogs, Tidal, Spotify, and AllMusic.

Title	Year	Artist	Album
"California King Bed"	2010	Rihanna	Loud
"Swagger Jagger"	2011	Cher Lloyd	Sticks and Stones
"Tomorrow Never Dies"	2011	Nicole Scherzinger	Killer Love (Deluxe Edition)
"How We Do (Party)"	2012	Rita Ora	Ora
"Biggest Fan"	2012	Chris Brown	Fortune (Deluxe Edition)
"Do It Again"	2012	Chris Brown	Fortune (Deluxe Edition)
"Running Out of Reasons"	2013	The Wanted	Word of Mouth
"By My Side"	2014	Great Good Fine Ok	Body Diamond
"Gone"	2015	Machine Gun Kelly	General Admission
"Force of Nature"	2015	Bea Miller	Not an Apology
"All Eyes on You" (Featuring Chris Brown & Nicki Minaj)	2015	Meek Mill	Dreams Worth More Than Money
"Daddy Lessons"	2016	Beyoncé	Lemonade
"F**k Off"	2016	The Lonely Island	Popstar: Never Stop Never Stopping OST
"Go for Broke" (Featuring James Arthur)	2017	MGK	Bloom
"Lose Somebody"	2020	Kygo & OneRepublic	Golden Hour & Human
"Dreams"	2020	Lil Wayne	Funeral
"Ankles"	2020	Jessie Reyez	Before Love Came to Kill Us
"Give A F***"	2020	John Duff	Non-album single
"Other Side"	2020	Khamari	Eldorado
"Sober"	2023	Hunter Hayes	Red Sky

== Awards and nominations ==
Year	Ceremony	Award	Result	Ref
2016	BMI R&B/Hip-Hip Awards	Most Performed R&B/Hip-Hop Songs (All Eyes on You)	Won	
2017	59th Annual Grammy Awards	Grammy Award for Album of the Year (Lemonade)	Nominated	
2021	BMI London Awards	Most Performed Songs (Lose Somebody)	Won	
2022	BMI Pop Awards	Most Performed Songs (Lose Somebody)	Won	
