= Daddy Lessons =

- Live at the CMA Awards cover art

Promotional single by Beyoncé featuring Dixie Chicks

from the album Lemonade
- Released: November 20, 2016
- Recorded: 2014
- Studio: Skip Saylor Recording (Northridge, California); The Beehive (Los Angeles)
- Genre: Country; zydeco
- Length: 4:49
- Label: Parkwood; Columbia
- Songwriters: Wynter Gordon; Beyoncé; Kevin Cossom; Alex Delicata; Darrell Scott (The Chicks version)
- Producer: Beyoncé

Audio
- "Daddy Lesons" on YouTube

"Daddy Lessons" is a song by American singer Beyoncé. It is the sixth track on her sixth studio album, Lemonade (2016), released through Parkwood Entertainment and Columbia Records. The song's music video is part of Beyoncé's 2016 film Lemonade, aired on HBO alongside the album's release.

The song was written and produced by Wynter Gordon, Beyoncé, Kevin Cossom and Alex Delicata. A remix with the Dixie Chicks (later renamed the Chicks) was released as a promotional single on November 2, 2016.

== Background and composition ==
Written and produced by Wynter Gordon, Beyoncé, Kevin Cossom and Alex Delicata, it is the singer's first Americana-country music record. In an interview with Billboard, Kevin Cossom talked about the creative process and the song's meaning:

"Working with Wynter Gordon was awesome, [...] because she's just so free and everything's so organic. We were in my condo in Miami, [...] I called over a good friend of mine, Alex Delicata, who is also co-producer and writer. He played the guitar, we harmonies, stomping and clapping, and that was the vibe. [...] I just honestly let her vibe out. It was obviously a female record. When it comes to that, I like to listen as far as the perspective of a woman or how they're feeling. It's pretty much daddy lessons. A girl that grew up tough. Her father was hard on her, didn't want nobody to take advantage of her. Definitely one of those situations. It painted a country picture in our minds. It didn't take the hip-hop element to make it tough, which I think is very cool especially for Beyoncé. And it goes with her being from Texas. Her vibe to it just makes sense for how it all came together."

At the end of the interview Cossom comments on the inclusion of the country genre in the singer's musical background, stating:

"Lemonade is very worldly in comparison to the last project, which was way more urban. This project is worldly and the record "Daddy Lessons" just happened to work. Once a formula works, people want to use that formula again until it doesn't work anymore but what's awesome about Beyoncé is she doesn't have to play by the rules: she creates them."

== Critical reception ==
Naming "Daddy Lessons" the best song on Lemonade, Carl Wilson for Slate writes that the track is

"certainly the best country pastiche ever heard on a contemporary R&B album, and it could be the country song of the year, period. It's reminiscent in theme and tone of classic Nashville mama/papa ballads by the likes of Dolly Parton or Tom T. Hall but, of course, from an utterly distinct vantage point."

There was controversy on if "Daddy Lessons" constituted a country track. In 2016, the Recording Academy's country music committee rejected the inclusion of "Daddy Lessons".

=== Recognition and accolades ===
"Daddy Lessons" and its performance at the 50th Annual Country Music Association Awards won Collaboration of the Year and Most Unforgettable Moment of the Year, respectively, at the 2017 Golden Boot Awards. Slate placed "Daddy Lessons" in its top 31 songs of 2016 list, while NPR considered the track the 63rd best song of 2016.

== Impact and controversy ==
=== Textual allusion to the relationship with her father ===
According to some publications, the song may be a reference to the singer's turbulent relationship with her father, Mathew Knowles. Michelle Kim of The Fader reported that "Beyoncé also confronts the parallels between her husband and her father, who was found to have also cheated on her mother during their 31-year marriage" but which "nevertheless, Lemonade doesn't chronicle all the twists and turns that Beyoncé and her father's relationship has undergone. While Beyoncé owes a lot to her persistent and sometimes even controlling father, die hard Beyoncé fans know that it's always been complicated". Joi-Marie McKenzie of ABC News writes that the singer "got introspective, sharing what she learned about men from her father" and she also has "shut down rumors that her father had never met her daughter, Blue Ivy, in the song's corresponding music video. Home footage showed the two happily playing".

During an academic lecture at Texas Southern University, Mathew Knowles, interviewed by SiriusXM's Mark Thompson, clarified leaked rumors following the release of the song, saying:

"I can only speak of being a proud father. I think Beyoncé pushed the envelope of creativity on this HBO special. [...] The media would have you think I've never spoken to Beyoncé. But as you can see in the documentary, that me and Blue Ivy was playing. I'm a grown-up, I'm 64 years old, it doesn't bother me what people say about me. I know the facts. I know how many times I see my kids, and they speak to me so that's not important to me."

=== Black cowboy culture ===
The song has been credited as starting a trend of "pop stars toying with American West and Southern aesthetics," as well as setting the precedent for "The Yeehaw Agenda", the trend of reclaiming black cowboy culture through music and fashion.

=== Reactions to the performance at the Country Music Association Awards ===
Beyoncé's performance of "Daddy Lessons" at the 50th Annual Country Music Association Awards along with the Dixie Chicks (later renamed the Chicks) sparked controversy among country music fans. As Alex Abad-Santos of Vox described the backlash: "Some of their sentiment was due to Beyoncé's liberal-leaning politics, some of it was rooted in her perceived lack of country cred, and some of it was downright racist." Although some country artists spoke out against having the singer perform at the awards ceremony, including Travis Tritt who said "As I see it, country music has appealed to millions for many years. We can stand on our own and don't need pop artists on our awards shows", many artists complimented the pop star's inclusion in the musical lineup, including Chris Stapleton, Kelsea Ballerini, Maren Morris, Cassadee Pope, and Brad Paisley.

In a statement accompanying the release of her eight studio album, the country-rooted Cowboy Carter, in 2024, Beyoncé made reference to an experience of exclusion from the country music establishment that inspired her to delve deeper into the genre and formed the impetus for the album; this was widely believed to refer to the "Daddy Lessons" performance at the CMAs. The album's lyrics further invoke this controversy, as she sings on opening track "Ameriican Requiem": "Used to say I spoke 'too country' / Then the rejection came, said I wasn’t country 'nough".

== Commercial performance ==
After the release of Lemonade, "Daddy Lessons" debuted and peaked on the Billboard Hot 100 at number 41 on the chart dating May 14, 2016. It also debuted on the Hot R&B/Hip-Hop songs chart at number 26. In overseas charts, the song entered in digital charts in top 10 in the Netherlands and Sweden. The song also reached the top 40 in the UK, and was certified silver by British Phonographic Industry (BPI) in February 2021.

After the release of the country music dual lead singles "Texas Hold 'Em" and "16 Carriages" for Beyoncé's eighth studio album Cowboy Carter (2024), "Daddy Lessons" increased up 370% on music streaming service.

== Remix ==
On November 2, 2016, Beyoncé released a remix of "Daddy Lessons" with the American country band the Dixie Chicks (later renamed the Chicks) free of charge on her website. On November 20, 2016, "Daddy Lessons" was released as a promotional single on iTunes and multiple streaming services. The song samples Darrell Scott's song "Long Time Gone" which was covered by the Chicks as the lead single on their 2002 album Home.

== Cover versions ==
"Daddy Lessons" was added to the Chicks' during their DCX MMXVI World Tour. On April 30, 2016, the song was covered for the first time at Manchester Arena in Manchester, England and remained in their setlist throughout the remainder of the European leg of the tour in addition to the North American leg of the tour. Billboard describes the performance as "faithful" to the original song.

In 2019, the song was covered in the episode "Chapter Fifty-Six: The Dark Secret of Harvest House" from the third season of the television series Riverdale, performed by Camila Mendes.

In 2024 the song was covered by Reneé Rapp during her concert at the Olympia Bruno Coquatrix in Paris.

== Live performances ==
"Daddy Lessons" was part of the setlist of Beyonce's The Formation World Tour with the first performance taking place in Miami at the Marlins Park on April 27, 2016. Beyoncé and the Chicks also performed the song with excerpts from the band's "Long Time Gone" at the 50th Annual Country Music Association Awards on November 2, 2016. A studio version was released after the performance.'

"Daddy Lessons" was brought back for the Cowboy Carter Tour in 2025, immediately following "Jolene."

== Charts ==
Chart (2016)	Peak position
Australia Urban Singles (ARIA)	12
Canada Hot 100 (Billboard)	62
France (SNEP)	90
Netherlands Digital Songs (Billboard)	7
Scottish Singles Sales (Official Charts)	25
Sweden Digital Songs (Billboard)	7
Switzerland (Schweizer Hitparade)	73
UK Singles (Official Charts)	40
UK Hip Hop/R&B (Official Charts)	13
US Billboard Hot 100	41
US Hot R&B/Hip-Hop Songs (Billboard)	26

== Certifications ==
Region	Certification	Certified units/sales
Australia (ARIA)	Gold	35,000^{‡}
Brazil (Pro-Música Brasil)	Gold	30,000^{‡}
Canada (Music Canada)	Platinum	80,000^{‡}
New Zealand (RMNZ)	Gold	15,000^{‡}
United Kingdom (BPI)	Silver	200,000^{‡}
United States (RIAA)	Platinum	1,000,000^{‡}
^{‡} Sales+streaming figures based on certification alone.
