= John Duff (singer) =

American singer (born 1988)

- Born: March 3, 1988 (age 38)
- Occupations: Singer; songwriter
- Years active: 2018–present
- Musical career
- Genre: pop
- Instruments: Vocals
- Website: www.johnduff.net

John Duff (born March 3, 1988) is an American singer and songwriter. Duff came to prominence on social media and rose to greater prominence following the release of several viral hit singles, including "Girly", "Rich", and "Hokie Pokie".

== Early life ==
Duff was born and raised in Howard County, Maryland. He is the youngest of four siblings, with two sisters and a brother. During his childhood, Duff recalls being musically influenced by his older sisters' music choices, including artists like Mariah Carey. He was also a fan of Janet Jackson, Britney Spears, and Michael Jackson. He became interested in public speaking and engaged in talent shows and local musical productions. His first musical role as a child was Conrad Birdie in a local production of Bye Bye Birdie. Duff states that he was bullied as early as age 8 for being perceived as gay. The bullying continued through middle school, to the point that he contemplated suicide. Duff recalled not having friends until his junior year of high school. After graduating from high school, he attended Syracuse University, graduating with a BFA in musical theater.

== Career in musical theater ==
In 2011, at age 21, Duff auditioned for the first season of the reality television contest X-Factor, but was negatively received by the judges, with judge Simon Cowell allegedly implying Duff was transgender for his feminine mannerisms, while judge Paula Abdul described him as "strange", which Duff interpreted as a commentary on his sexual orientation. Feeling that the judges were commenting on his persona rather than his abilities, he described the experience as "the most degrading and humiliating experience of his life." Landing a job in a stage musical adaptation of Saved by the Bell (Bayside! The Musical!, an unauthorized parody of the show) helped rebuild his confidence afterward, and he continued to work in musical theater in New York for six years. After working in the musical for three years, in 2016, he directed the off-Broadway production of Katdashians! Break the Musical!, an unauthorized parody of both Keeping Up with the Kardashians and Cats. The musical extended its initial run, but was later forced to close following litigation from Andrew Lloyd Webber.

== Music career ==
=== Debut singles and internet fame ===
Finding musical theater to be creatively limiting as an actor, and following encouragement from Perez Hilton while working together in a different production in Toronto, Duff moved to West Hollywood to pursue his music career, eventually moving to Los Angeles in 2017. Before releasing his first single, Duff cultivated a significant online presence, posting videos address LGBTQ political issues, messages of positivity to the LGBTQ community, showcasing his life, and his ability to sing. His online popularity and imminent music career led Instinct Magazine to describe him as "[maybe] the most important gay pop star today, and he is yet to release his first single!"

In August 2018, Duff released his debut single, "Girly", with an accompanying video on YouTube. The video is an homage to the music video for Mariah Carey's 1999 single "Heartbreaker", as well as other female pop singers' music videos from the late-90s and 2000s, like Christina Aguilera, Madonna, and Britney Spears. The video also featured drag queens Bianca Del Rio, Willam Belli, and Mariah Paris Balenciaga, all friends of Duff's. Duff spoke extensively about the desire to challenge criticisms of embracing femininity, especially as a gay artist, ones that he had received both before and throughout his career. The video was well received, with Out Magazine describing Duff as "poised to become the next big gay pop star." As of 2021, the video received 800,000 views on YouTube, along with hundreds of thousands of streams on streaming services, with write ups on outlets such as OUT Magazine, HuffPost, and Instinct, among others.

"Girly" was followed up by his next single, the hip-hop mid-tempo song "Rich", made with producer Alex Delicata, released in September 2018. The song and its accompanying video provide "commentary on pop culture's love-hate obsession with the rich and famous." In 2019, he made his film debut in the gay coming-of-age movie Cubby, written and directed by Mark Blane and Ben Mankoff.

Duff released several more singles through the following year, including "Hokie Pokie" in September 2020. The single, described as "straddling the line between hip hop and house" and "scorchingly provocative", is about cunnilingus, and Duff's writing received positive reviews from various outlets, who also interpreted it as a song about anilingus. The video was directed by Brad Hammer, and drew comparisons with Cardi B and Megan Thee Stallion's 2020 single "WAP", a comparison that disappointed Duff, as he felt it misconstrued "Hokie Pokie" as a parody, despite the video being shot a week before "WAP" debuted.

Duff's next single was "Give a Fuck", which was also produced in collaboration with Delicata. The track was described as blending Duff's Broadway sensibilities with R&B and "feel-good pop rhythms". Reviewers noted inspiration for the music video from artists like Liberace and TLC, and describing it as "perfect love song for the age of the pandemic." Following the release of "Give a Fuck", Duff indicated that he was set to release an EP in 2021. He continued to release singles in early 2021, including "Do It", "I Hate LA", and "100% Baby".

=== Homo•Sapien EP (2021) - present ===
Duff released his debut EP Homo•Sapien in June 2021, produced by Koil PreAmple. Stephen Daw of Billboard praised the album, calling it a "fabulous new project" and noting the tracks' themes of queer masculinity and religious discrimination. Duff described the EP as "a collection of songs that I wrote without consideration of rules", writing them about "everything [he] was told he shouldn't do in life." A portion of the EP's sales also contributed to The Future Perfect Project, an organization dedicated to promoting performances of original work by queer youth.

The EP's debut single was "High Heels", a track that included vocals from Tony Award-winning Broadway singer Lillias White. Writing for PopWrapped, Rebecca Haslam described the debut single as having "lush orchestrations and breathtaking vocals" from Duff and White. In his review of the album, Stephen Daw noted "High Heels" as the highlight of Homo•Sapien, calling it the "musical pinnacle equivalent to a confetti cannon exploding." The accompanying music video was directed by Duff and Shawn Adeli. The second single off the EP was "Is It A Sin", released in 2022, with remix collaborations with Eric Kupper.

Duff also co-wrote two of Kylie Sonique Love's singles: "Complete Me" and "Do It Like Dolly", while also providing creative direction for the latter's accompanying music video.

In 2023, Duff released four independent singles: "Cruise Control", "House on Fire", "Somebody's Daughter", and "Gravity". "House on Fire", released in June, was written about feelings Duff had upon going on a first date with someone who he believed was "the one". Its accompanying music video explored the dark side of obsession and social media. The track was described as a "nostalgic and groovy" "breezy throwback". Duff wrote the track with Eren Cannata, with additional collaboration with Delicata and Luke Moellman. Xavier Hamel directed the video, with creative direction by Adrian Gilliland and Duff. In the video, Duff portrays an aspiring social media influencer whose social media depicts positivity, while behind the scenes, Duff is keeping a woman captive while torturing her and obsessing over his image. Duff's TikTok dance routine was choreographed by Duff himself, and was recreated on the social media platform by Paula Abdul.

"Somebody's Daughter" was released in September 2023, along with its music video. The video came to attention by several outlets for Duff's nearly nude scenes, where he portrayed a gay man pretending to be heterosexual for his viewing audience. The nude scenes with Duff and video co-star Nellie Salisbury—who debuted in Duff's video for "House on Fire"—came about after the video's costumer disappeared during shooting, leaving them in a lurch. Duff then shopped at various stripper costuming stores to fit the scenes and they opted instead to shoot some scenes in the nude, something the crew was unaware of until they walked onto set. The video satirizes the trend of straight artists being accused of "queer-baiting" for attention, in what Duff and outlets referred to as "straight-baiting". In reference to the misogynistic lyrical content of the song and double standards in the industry, Duff said, "I've been told over and over that the themes of my music aren't 'for everyone,' so I wrote a super misogynistic song that now 'everyone' can enjoy." He also commented on frustration with the "queer-baiting" phenomenon as one in which gay artists failed to get attention from LGBT audiences, while straight artists pandering to queer interests were celebrated. In a PRIDE interview, Duff reflected, "I had been making songs that were explicitly gay and they were to my detriment, which is really hard to take when you're watching every other mainstream artist pretend to be gay."

Duff released his fourth new single, "Gravity" in November 2023.

== Personal life ==
In 2020, Duff described his sexuality as a complex journey of rediscovery. "I'm on a journey...I've been really curious about my sexuality lately. Really confused, but not any sort of crisis. I'm at peace with it...So, I'm not gay. I'm not bi. I'm not straight. I'm not asexual. I don't even know anymore. I'm just living. Boxes are stupid." He stated being open to attraction to women as well, something he felt he had rejected after internalizing being called gay by antagonizers since his childhood. As of 2023, Duff was romantically linked with actor Rafael de la Fuente.

Duff has publicly shared about his journey to sobriety, describing his 20s as a period of struggle with his mental health and addiction, which he worked through, including abstaining from alcohol consumption. He had attempted sobriety several times, but as of 2023, has been over 3 years sober.

== Discography ==
=== Singles ===
List of singles, with details
Title	Date	Details	Album
"Girly"	August 24, 2018	Debut single	Non-album single
"Rich"	September 13, 2019		Non-album single
"Stop the Show"	December 23, 2019	Collaboration with DJ Jovani	Non-album single
"Love of My Night"	February 14, 2020		Non-album single
"Hurt Somebody"	June 26, 2020		Non-album single
"Walking Home"	July 23, 2020		Non-album single
"The Sex"	September 4, 2020		Non-album single
"Hokie Pokie"	September 18, 2020		Non-album single
"Give a Fuck"	October 16, 2020		Non-album single
"Do It"	January 22, 2021		Non-album single
"No One Left to Love"	February 26, 2021		Non-album single
"100% Baby"	March 19, 2021		Non-album single
"I Hate L.A."	May 24, 2021		Non-album single
"High Heels"	June 25, 2021		Homo•Sapien
"Is It A Sin (Eric Kupper Remix)"	May 27, 2022	Eric Kupper Remix	Homo•Sapien
"Cruise Control"	March 3, 2023		Non-album single
"House on Fire"	May 19, 2023		Non-album single
"Somebody's Daughter"	September 1, 2023		Non-album single
"Gravity"	November 10, 2023		Non-album single
"Stick Up"	November 8, 2024		Non-album single

=== Remixes ===
List of singles, with details
Title	Date	Details
Rich (Ryan Skyy Remix)	December 21, 2019	
Stop the Show (Anske Remix) "Stop the Show (Anske Extended Remix)	May 29, 2020	Collaboration with DJ Jovani
High Heels (Disco Fries Remix) High Heels (Qubiko Radio Edit) High Heels (Qubiko Remix)	July 30, 2021	High Heels (Remixed) EP
Is It A Sin (Eric Kupper Club Edit) Is It A Sin (Eric Kupper Radio Edit)	May 27, 2022	
Is It A Sin (Block & Crown and Nick Fiorucci Remix Edit) Is It A Sin (Block & Crown and Nick Fiorucci Remix)	June 10, 2022	
Is It A Sin (MIDIMACK Groovy Vocal Remix) Is It A Sin (MIDIMACK Funky Club Dub Remix)	June 17, 2022	
Is It A Sin (Chris Cox Radio Mix) Is It A Sin (Chris Cox Club Mix)	June 24, 2022	
Cruise Control (Niko the Kid Remix)	May 5, 2023	
House On Fire (Eric Kupper Remix) House On Fire (Eric Kupper Extended Remix)	June 23, 2023	
House On Fire (KOIL REMIX)	August 18, 2023	
Somebody's Daughter (XXX Mix)	October 6, 2023	
Gravity (Remix)	January 5, 2024	

=== EPs ===
List of extended plays, with details
Title	Details
Homo•Sapien	Released: June 25, 2021; Label: Independent; Format: Streamed audio
High Heels (Remixed)	Released: July 30, 2021; Label: Independent; Format: Streamed audio
