= Zak Abel =

English singer-songwriter

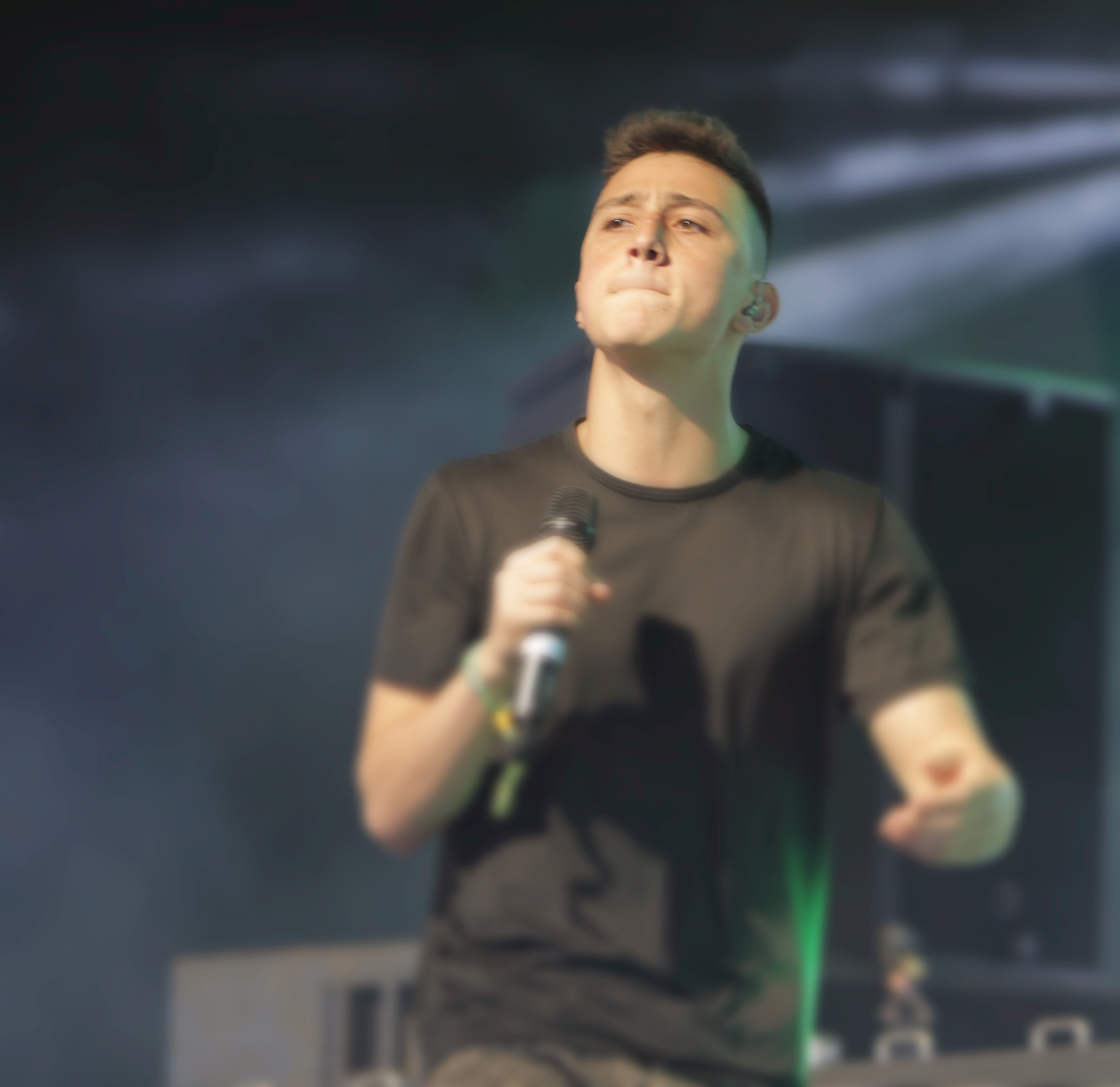
- Zak Abel performing during the 2014 Glastonbury Festival

Background information
- Also known as: Zak Abel
- Born: Zak David Zilesnick; 1 March 1995 (age 31)
- Origin: London, England, UK
- Genres: Pop; R&B; tropical; electronic; soul; Highlife
- Years active: 2014–present
- Label: Atlantic

Zak David Zilesnick (born 1 March 1995), better known professionally as Zak Abel, is an English singer, songwriter, and musician. He has also been an English Cadet national table tennis champion. He is known for songs including "Be Kind", "Unstable", "Say Sumthin", and "Freedom" (as a featured artist with Kygo).

== Early and personal life ==
His father, who had been born in Morocco and immigrated to Israel, died when Zilesnick was 12 years old. Zilesnick is Jewish. He grew up in Hendon with his mother Rachel, and attended the Jewish state school Matilda Marks, and University College School, from which he graduated in 2013. He later moved to Hackney. He is a vegan.

After experiencing hearing loss, he was diagnosed with otosclerosis aged 21 and underwent surgery on his right ear. This restored most of the volume but affects his ability to hear pitch and so he had to relearn it. He also has hearing loss in his left ear and wears a hearing aid.

== Table tennis youth player ==
He was ranked No. 1 in the Cadet age group in England and was 2009 Cadet Boys' Singles national champion at the age of 14; he was also ranked No. 5 for under 18s in England. Between 2008 and 2010, he won the Under 15 national singles and Under 18 doubles titles. In 2010, he was ranked number 39 in the senior category.

== Music career ==
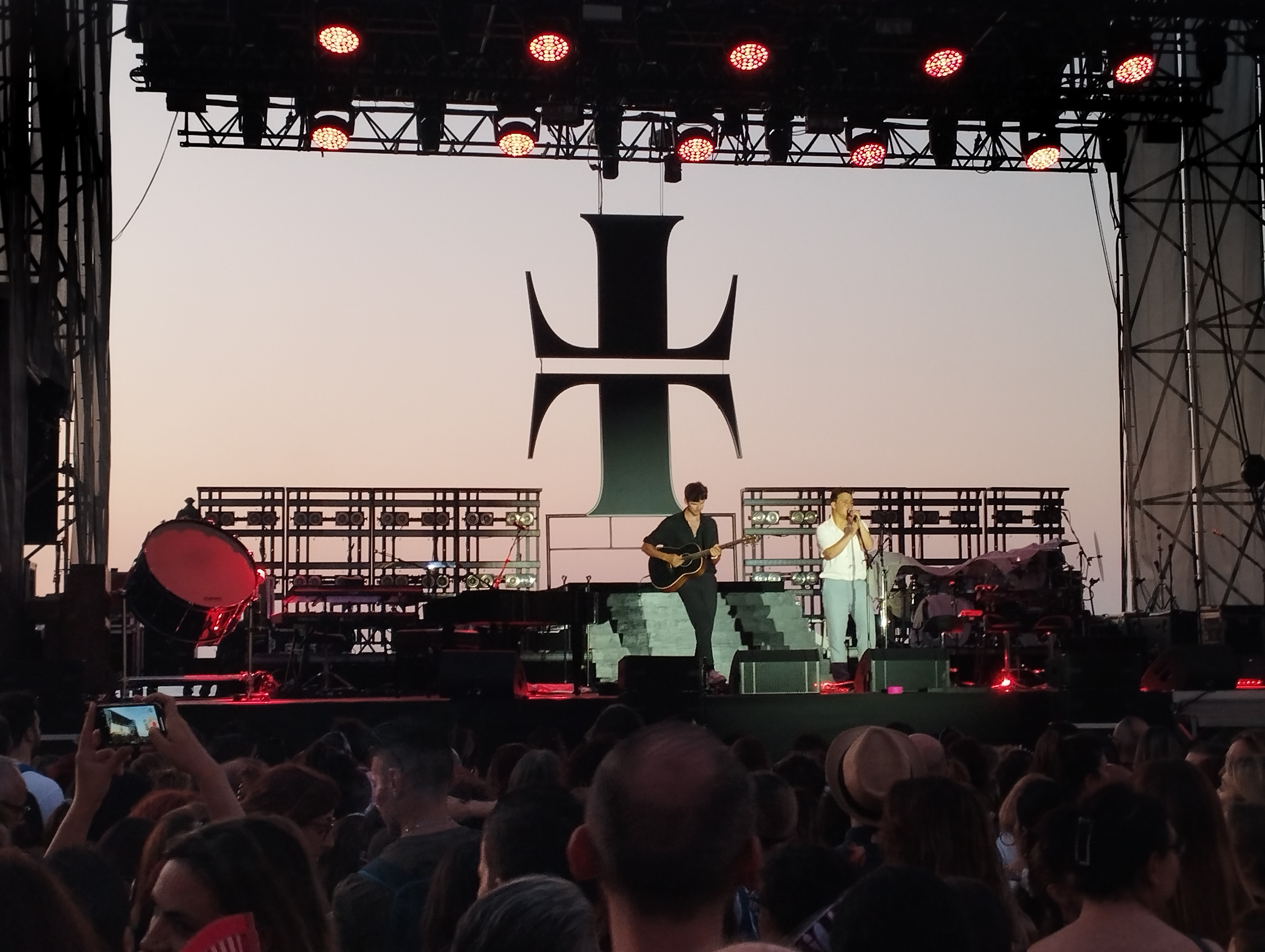
Abel performing as a supporting artist for Take That in Italy, summer 2024

Zilesnick won a competition to sing at Israel's Yom Haatzmaut celebration in Wembley Stadium when he was in primary school.

He made a featured appearance on the UK top 20 hit "Unmissable" with Gorgon City. He has also released two extended plays, entitled Joker presents Zak Abel and One Hand on the Future.

In 2016, he worked with producers such as Kaytranada and Wookie on his debut album, Only When We're Naked, which was released on 6 October 2017, and debuted at number 100 on the UK Albums Chart. He was signed by Atlantic Records.

On 7 May 2023, he replaced Freya Ridings in the Coronation Concert at Windsor Castle.

== Discography ==
=== Studio albums ===
Title	Details	Peak chart positions
Title	Details	UK
Only When We're Naked	Released: 6 October 2017; Label: Atlantic; Formats: CD, DL	100
Love Over Fear	Released: 25 August 2023; Label: BMG Rights Management; Formats: CD, DL	—
"—" denotes a recording that did not chart or was not released in that territory.

=== Extended plays ===
Title	Details
Joker presents Zak Abel	Scheduled: 6 February 2015; Label: Atlantic Records; Formats: DL
One Hand on the Future	Scheduled: 28 August 2015; Label: Atlantic Records; Formats: DL

=== Singles ===
As lead artist

Title	Year	Album
"These Are the Days"	2014	Joker presents Zak Abel
"Wise Enough" (with Joker)	2015	Joker presents Zak Abel
"Say Sumthin"	2015	One Hand on the Future
"Everybody Needs Love"	2016	Non-album single
"Unstable"	2017	Only When We're Naked
"Rock Bottom" (featuring Wretch 32)	2017	Only When We're Naked
"All I Ever Do (Is Say Goodbye)"	2017	Only When We're Naked
"Only When We're Naked"	2017	Only When We're Naked
"The River"	2017	Only When We're Naked
"Love Song"	2018	Non-album singles
"You Come First" (featuring Saweetie)	2018	Non-album singles
"The Power" (with Duke Dumont)	2019	Duality
"Sad in Scandinavia" (with Seeb)	2020	Sad in Scandinavia
"Be Kind"	2021	Non-album singles
"Right Side of the Bed"	2021	Non-album singles
"Why Can't We Get Along"	2021	Non-album singles
"Less of a Man"	2021	Non-album singles
"Good Times" (with Sheku Kanneh-Mason)	2022	Non-album singles
"What Love Is"	2023	Love Over Fear
"Dance with You (The Comeback)"	2023	Love Over Fear
"Woman"	2023	Love Over Fear
"How Do We Stay in Love?"	2023	Love Over Fear
"Home"	2025	TBA
"My Way"	2025	TBA
"Brother to Me" (with Rhys Lewis)	2025	TBA
"Champagne Supernova"	2025	TBA
"Hallelujah"	2026	TBA

As featured artist

Title	Year	Peak chart positions					Album
Title	Year	UK	UK Dance	GER	SCO	SWI	Album
"Higher" (Wookie featuring Zak Abel)	2014	—	—	—	—	—	Non-album single
"Unmissable" (Gorgon City featuring Zak Abel)	2014	19	5	—	16	—	Sirens
"Make You Love Me" (Jarreau Vandal featuring Zak Abel)	2017	—	—	—	—	—	Non-album single
"Bad" (Don Diablo featuring Zak Abel)	2020	—	—	—	—	—	Forever
"Freedom" (Kygo featuring Zak Abel)	2020	77	—	90	—	25	Golden Hour
"Endless Summer" (Alan Walker featuring Zak Abel)	2023	—	—	—	—	—	Walkerworld
"For Life" (Kygo featuring Zak Abel and Nile Rodgers)	2024	75	29	—	—	75	Kygo
"—" denotes a recording that did not chart or was not released in that territory.

=== Other appearances ===
Title	Year	Album	Artist
"Ten More Days"	2015	Stories	Avicii
"Beautiful Escape"	2015	Beat Tape 2	Tom Misch
"Drink to You"	2018	Blue	Jonas Blue
"Gotta Get Thru This"	2019	Garage Classical	DJ Spoony with Katie Chatburn and The Ignition Orchestra

=== Songwriting credits ===
Title	Year	Artist(s)	Album	Written with
"I'll Be Gentle" (with John Legend)	2017	Paloma Faith	The Architect	Paloma Faith, Thomas Barnes, Peter Kelleher, Benjamin Kohn
"Somebody" (with HRVY & Nina Nesbitt)	2018	Sigala	Brighter Days	Bruce Fielder, Sky Adams, Daniel Shah, Lawrie Martin-Prime, Justus Nzeribe
