= Only When We're Naked =

Debut studio album by Moroccan-English musician Zak Abel

Studio album by Zak Abel
- Released: 6 October 2017
- Length: 34:23
- Label: Atlantic
- Producer: Sky Adams; Cass Lowe; Will Simms; Eg White; Fred Cox

Zak Abel chronology
One Hand on the Future (2015)	Only When We're Naked (2017)	Love Over Fear (2023)

Singles from Only When We're Naked
- 1. "Unstable" Released: 2017; 2. "Rock Bottom" Released: 2017; 3. "All I Ever Do (Is Say Goodbye)" Released: 2017; 4. "Only When We're Naked" Released: 2017; 5. "The River" Released: 2017

Only When We're Naked is the debut studio album by Moroccan-English musician Zak Abel. It was released on 6 October 2017 through Atlantic Records. The album includes the singles "Unstable", "Rock Bottom", "All I Ever Do (Is Say Goodbye)", "Only When We're Naked", and "The River".

== Background ==
Talking about the album, Abel said: "I'm really into African sounds. I have been for the last 2 years. The album is basically a compilation of songs that I felt were me at my most vulnerable and most honest as I was writing them. I'd say my general sound is very soul pop and funk but the album has quite a lot of African influences too. I wanted to try some of that out."

== Track listing ==
Only When We're Naked track listing
No.	Title	Writer(s)	Producer(s)	Length
1.	"Unstable"	Zak Zilesnick; Danny Shah; Sky Adams; Lawrie Martin	Adams	3:45
2.	"Still Want UUU"	Zilesnick; Shah; Adams; Martin	Adams	3:12
3.	"Broken"	Zilesnick; Adams; Fred Cox; Amy Wadge	Adams	3:04
4.	"The River"	Zilesnick; Cass Lowe	Lowe	4:01
5.	"Beautiful Life"	Zilesnick; Adams; Martin; Maegan Cottone	Adams	3:29
6.	"Only When We're Naked"	Zilesnick; Shah; Adams; Martin; Will Simms; Guy Chambers	Adams; Simms^{[a]}	3:04
7.	"Awakening"	Zilesnick; Adams; Tim Woodcock	Adams	3:05
8.	"Deserve to Be Loved"	Zilesnick; Francis White	Eg White; Adams^{[b]}	3:57
9.	"Rock Bottom" (featuring Wretch 32)	Zilesnick; Cox; Jonny Lattimer; Jermine Scott; Samuel Ademosu; J. Warner	Cox	3:46
10.	"All I Ever Do (Is Say Goodbye)"	Zilesnick; Shah; Adams; Martin	Adams	3:00
Total length:				34:23

== Charts ==
Chart performance for Only When We're Naked
Chart (2017)	Peak position
UK Albums (OCC)	100

== Release history ==
Release history and formats for Only When We're Naked
Region	Date	Format	Label
Various	6 October 2017	Digital download	Atlantic
