= London College of Contemporary Music =

Coordinates: 51°30′14″N 0°5′39″W

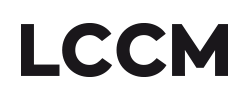
- Former names: London Centre of Contemporary Music, London College of Creative Media
- Type: For-profit private higher education college
- Established: 2002
- Founders: Darius Khwaja; Geoff Hemsley
- Principal: Anthony Hamer-Hodges
- Students: 260 (as of 2016)
- Location: 241 Union Street, London, United Kingdom
- Owner: Global University Systems
- Website: lccm.org.uk

London College of Contemporary Music (LCCM) is a private college of higher education in South London offering undergraduate and master's degrees in music performance, music production and music business. It was founded in 2002 as the London Centre of Contemporary Music temporarily using the name London College of Creative Media from 2016 to 2021. Notable alumni include Tom Walker and Rhys Lewis as well as musicians that tour regularly with George Ezra and Sam Ryder.

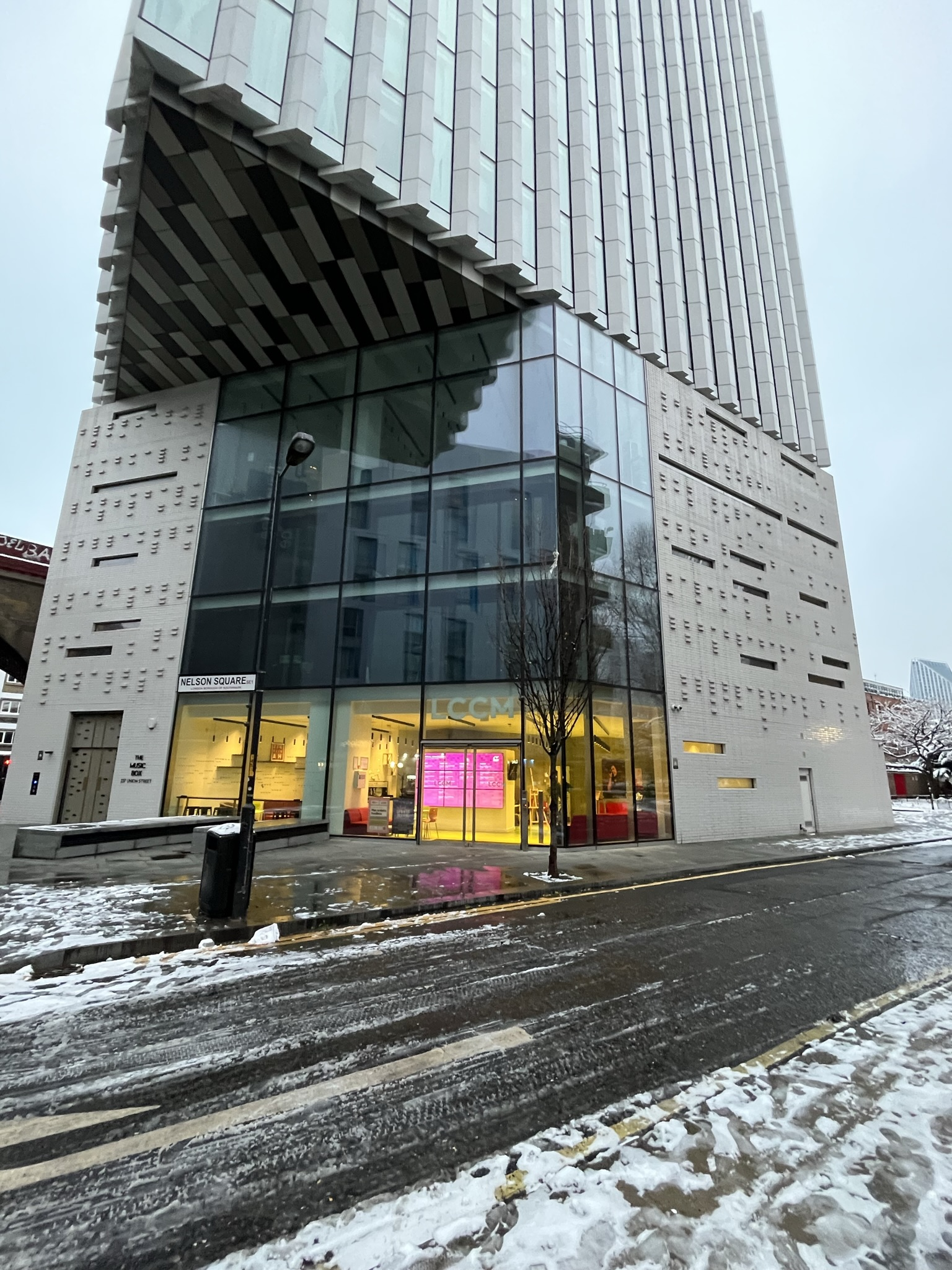
LCCM's Music Box campus in the snow

LCCM was also the home of the National Youth Jazz Orchestra from 2012 to 2017.

== Current Programmes ==
As of May 2023, the college offers BA (Honours) degrees in Commercial Music, and Music Business Management; BMus (Honours) degrees in Commercial Music Technology; Music Performance & Production and Composition for Films, Games & Other Media; and two MMus degrees in Music Performance and Music Production. It also offers Certificates of Higher Education in Commercial Music and Entertainment Business & Technology. All academic programmes are validated and awarded by the University for the Creative Arts. The college offers additional short courses in music development and a summer school for young musicians.

== Current Faculty ==
The Principal of LCCM since 2021 is Anthony Hamer-Hodges, a pioneering music executive who discovered & managed the UK Soul Singer Nate James between 2004-2009 and was employee number one and Chief Commercial Officer of fan-powered streaming service Supapass in 2014.

== History ==
LCCM was founded in 2002 by Geoff Hemsley and Darius Khwaja. Both were professional musicians; Khwaja had also worked for various arts organizations on a freelance basis. The college has always specialised in teaching the technical aspects of contemporary popular music and in preparation for a career in the industry. In 2017 LCCM moved to its current campus The Music Box, SE1.

The Music Box is a purpose-built campus on Union Street built on the site of one of LCCM's original buildings.

The expansion of the college to the new campus caused financial difficulties in 2017 that led to insolvency of the old company 'London College of Creative Media Ltd.' and rescue by Global University Systems in January 2018. The new company, owned by GUS, was registered as LCCM AU UK Ltd. LCCM subsequently announced that as part of Global University Systems it would remain fully operational with no material changes to either tutors or student activity. Students were able to complete their courses without interruption through LCCM's existing collaboration with the Open University.

Since becoming part of the GUS Group LCCM has ranked as the top institution for contemporary music performance degrees in the UK four years in a row according to the independent National Student Survey with the highest overall student satisfaction.”

== Campus ==
LCCM's Music Box campus on 241 Union Street was built in 2017. Designed by Trevor Moriss and known as "The Music Box", the cube-shaped building houses the college on its first six floors. Its exterior is decorated with glazed bricks laid in a pattern replicating the piano arrangement of Cream's song "White Room". The building can accommodate 550 students at any one time and includes recording studios with double-height windows which allow passers-by to see those working inside and an underground performance space which seats 200. The upper floors of the building are devoted to privately owned apartments.

== Notable faculty and alumni ==
Alumni and past and present faculty of LCCM include:

- Charlie Cawood, multi-instrumental musician and composer (tutor and graduate 2009)
- Hafdís Huld, singer and actress (graduate 2006)
- Trudy Kerr, jazz vocalist (tutor)
- Dave O'Higgins, jazz saxophonist, composer, arranger (tutor)
- Merlin Rhys-Jones, guitarist and former member of The Blockheads (tutor)
- Tom Walker, singer and songwriter (graduate 2014)
- Ned Wyndham, Alex "Billy" Hill, and Josh Martens, members of the Scoundrels (graduates 2007)
