= Lose Somebody =

Single by Kygo and OneRepublic

from the album Golden Hour and Human (Deluxe)
- Released: 15 May 2020
- Genre: Dance-pop
- Length: 3:19
- Label: Sony Music
- Songwriters: Kyrre Gørvell-Dahll; Philip Plested; Ryan Tedder; Jacob Torrey; Morten Ristorp; Alexander Delicata; Alysa Vanderheym
- Producer: Kygo

Kygo singles chronology
"Freedom" (2020)	"Lose Somebody" (2020)	"The Truth" (2020)

OneRepublic singles chronology
"Better Days" (2020)	"Lose Somebody" (2020)	"Wild Life" (2020)

Music video
- "Lose Somebody" on YouTube

"Lose Somebody" is a song by Norwegian DJ Kygo and American band OneRepublic. It was released through Sony Music on 15 May 2020 as the fifth single from Kygo's third studio album Golden Hour. The song was written by Kyrre Gørvell-Dahll, Philip Plested, Ryan Tedder, Jacob Torrey, Morten Ristorp, Alexander Delicata and Alysa Vanderheym. The song was also included on the deluxe edition of OneRepublic's fifth studio album Human (2021).

== Personnel ==
Credits adapted from Tidal.

- Kyrre Gørvell-Dahll – producer, composer, lyricist, associated performer
- Alexander Delicata – composer, lyricist, co-producer, guitar
- Alysa Vanderheym – composer, lyricist, co-producer
- Jacob Torrey – composer, lyricist
- Morten Ristorp – composer, lyricist, co-producer, piano
- Philip Plested – composer, lyricist
- Ryan Tedder – composer, lyricist
- OneRepublic – associated performer
- Tyler Spry – associated performer, guitar
- John Nathaniel – co-producer
- Myles Sheer – executive producer
- Randy Merrill – mastering engineer
- Serban Ghenea – mixing engineer
- Brent Kutzle – programmer

== Charts ==
=== Weekly charts ===
Chart (2020–2021)	Peak position
Australia (ARIA)	31
Austria (Ö3 Austria Top 40)	28
Belgium (Ultratop 50 Flanders)	33
Belgium (Ultratop 50 Wallonia)	43
Canada Hot 100 (Billboard)	45
Canada AC (Billboard)	39
Canada CHR/Top 40 (Billboard)	34
Canada Hot AC (Billboard)	24
Czech Republic Airplay (ČNS IFPI)	18
Czech Republic Singles Digital (ČNS IFPI)	48
Germany (GfK)	45
Hungary (Rádiós Top 40)	35
Hungary (Single Top 40)	24
Hungary (Stream Top 40)	37
Iceland (Tónlistinn)	18
Ireland (IRMA)	35
Lithuania (AGATA)	31
Netherlands (Dutch Top 40)	20
Netherlands (Single Top 100)	30
New Zealand Hot Singles (RMNZ)	2
Norway (VG-lista)	5
Portugal (AFP)	88
Scottish Singles Sales (Official Charts)	32
Singapore (RIAS)	28
Slovakia Airplay (ČNS IFPI)	30
Slovakia Singles Digital (ČNS IFPI)	33
Sweden (Sverigetopplistan)	12
Switzerland (Schweizer Hitparade)	20
UK Singles (Official Charts)	46
US Billboard Hot 100	88
US Adult Contemporary (Billboard)	23
US Adult Pop Airplay (Billboard)	8
US Hot Dance/Electronic Songs (Billboard)	5
US Pop Airplay (Billboard)	27

=== Year-end charts ===
Chart (2020)	Position
Australia (ARIA)	98
Belgium (Ultratop Flanders)	87
Netherlands (Dutch Top 40)	92
Netherlands (Single Top 100)	81
Switzerland (Schweizer Hitparade)	80
US Adult Top 40 (Billboard)	35
US Hot Dance/Electronic Songs (Billboard)	10

Chart (2021)	Position
US Hot Dance/Electronic Songs (Billboard)	20

== Certifications ==
Region	Certification	Certified units/sales
Australia (ARIA)	Platinum	70,000^{‡}
Austria (IFPI Austria)	Platinum	30,000^{‡}
Canada (Music Canada)	3× Platinum	240,000^{‡}
Denmark (IFPI Danmark)	Platinum	90,000^{‡}
France (SNEP)	Gold	100,000^{‡}
Mexico (AMPROFON)	Gold	30,000^{‡}
New Zealand (RMNZ)	Platinum	30,000^{‡}
Poland (ZPAV)	Gold	10,000^{‡}
Spain (Promusicae)	Gold	30,000^{‡}
Switzerland (IFPI Switzerland)	Gold	10,000^{‡}
United Kingdom (BPI)	Gold	400,000^{‡}
United States (RIAA)	Platinum	1,000,000^{‡}
^{‡} Sales+streaming figures based on certification alone.

== Release history ==
Region	Date	Format	Label
Various	15 May 2020	Digital download; streaming	Sony Music
Australia	22 May 2020	Contemporary hit radio	Ultra Music; Sony
United States	8 June 2020	Hot AC radio	RCA
United States	23 June 2020	Contemporary hit radio	RCA
Italy	26 June 2020	Contemporary hit radio	Sony
