= Someday (Kygo and Zac Brown song) =

2020 song by Kygo & Zac Brown

Song by Kygo and Zac Brown

from the album Golden Hour
- Released: 28 May 2020
- Genre: Tropical house; country
- Length: 3:43
- Label: Sony Music
- Songwriter(s): Kyrre Gørvell-Dahll; Nick Furlong; Nicholas Petricca; Zac Brown
- Producer(s): Kygo; Nick Furlong

"Someday" is a song by Norwegian DJ Kygo and American singer-songwriter Zac Brown, the lead singer from country band Zac Brown Band. It was released by Sony Music from Kygo's third studio album Golden Hour.

== Critical reception ==
Alshaan Kassam of We Rave You felt the song: "blends Kygo’s high-energy production with Band’s soulful vocals to keep us dancing all day long." Sydney Grant of EDM Identity praised Zac Brown "bumping basslines and echoing melodies reminiscent of a beach-side rodeo."

== Charts ==
=== Weekly charts ===
Weekly chart performance of "Someday"
Chart (2020)	Peak position
US Hot Dance/Electronic Songs (Billboard)	25

=== Year-end charts ===
Year-end chart performance of "Someday"
Chart (2020)	Position
US Hot Dance/Electronic Songs (Billboard)	86
