= I'll Wait (Kygo and Sasha Sloan song) =

Single by Kygo and Sasha Sloan

from the album Golden Hour
- Released: 3 April 2020
- Length: 3:35
- Label: Sony Music
- Songwriters: Kyrre Gørvell-Dahll; Alexandra Yatchenko; Scott Harris
- Producers: Kygo; Scott Harris

Kygo singles chronology
"Like It Is" (2020)	"I'll Wait" (2020)	"Freedom" (2020)

Sasha Sloan singles chronology
"Smiling When I Die" (2019)	"I'll Wait" (2020)	"Lie" (2020)

Music videos
- "I'll Wait" (Lyric video) on YouTube "I'll Wait" on YouTube

"I'll Wait" is a song by Norwegian DJ Kygo and American singer-songwriter Sasha Sloan. It was released through Sony Music on 3 April 2020 as the third single from Kygo's third studio album Golden Hour. The song was written by Kyrre Gørvell-Dahll, Sasha Sloan and Scott Harris.

== Music video ==
A music video to accompany the release of "I'll Wait" was first released onto YouTube on 3 April 2020. The music video features real-life couple Rob Gronkowski and Camille Kostek.

== Personnel ==
Credits adapted from Tidal.

- Kyrre Gørvell-Dahll – producer, composer, lyricist, associated performer
- Scott Harris – producer, lyricist, guitar
- Sasha Sloan – lyricist, associated performer
- Randy Merrill – mastering engineer
- Serban Ghenea – mixing engineer

== Charts ==
=== Weekly charts ===
Chart (2020)	Peak position
Austria (Ö3 Austria Top 40)	71
Germany (GfK)	89
Hungary (Single Top 40)	3
Lithuania (AGATA)	54
New Zealand Hot Singles (RMNZ)	6
Norway (VG-lista)	9
Scottish Singles Sales (Official Charts)	26
Sweden (Sverigetopplistan)	28
Switzerland (Schweizer Hitparade)	24
UK Singles Downloads (Official Charts)	39
US Bubbling Under Hot 100 (Billboard)	7
US Hot Dance/Electronic Songs (Billboard)	5

=== Year-end charts ===
Chart (2020)	Position
Hungary (Single Top 40)	94
US Hot Dance/Electronic Songs (Billboard)	22

== Certifications ==
Region	Certification	Certified units/sales
Canada (Music Canada)	Platinum	80,000^{‡}
United States (RIAA)	Gold	500,000^{‡}
^{‡} Sales+streaming figures based on certification alone.

== Release history ==
Region	Date	Format	Label
Various	3 April 2020	Digital download; streaming	Sony Music
