= Freedom (Kygo song) =

Single by Kygo featuring Zak Abel

from the album Golden Hour
- Released: 17 April 2020
- Genre: Tropical house
- Length: 3:18
- Label: Sony Music
- Songwriter(s): Kyrre Gørvell-Dahll; Lawrie Martin; Sandro Cavazza; Zak Abel
- Producer(s): Kygo; Lawrie Martin

Kygo singles chronology
"I'll Wait" (2020)	"Freedom" (2020)	"Lose Somebody" (2020)

Zak Abel singles chronology
"Bad" (2020)	"Freedom" (2020)	"Sad in Scandinavia" (2020)

"Freedom" is a song by Norwegian DJ Kygo featuring English singer, songwriter and musician Zak Abel. It was released through Sony Music on 17 April 2020 as the fourth single from Kygo's third studio album Golden Hour. The song was written by Kyrre Gørvell-Dahll, Lawrie Martin, Sandro Cavazza and Zak Abel.

== Music video ==
A music video to accompany the release of "Freedom" was first released onto YouTube on 17 April 2020. The music video was directed by Johannes Lovund and was originally going to be filmed in the Maldives, but due to the COVID-19 pandemic, Kygo and Abel filmed some clips of them at home while in quarantine.

== Personnel ==
Credits adapted from Tidal.

- Kyrre Gørvell-Dahll – producer, composer, lyricist, associated performer
- Lawrie Martin – producer, composer, lyricist
- Sandro Cavazza – composer, lyricist
- Zak Abel – composer, lyricist, associated performer
- Randy Merrill – mastering engineer
- John Hanes – mixing engineer
- Serban Ghenea – mixing engineer

== Charts ==
=== Weekly charts ===
Chart (2020)	Peak position
Austria (Ö3 Austria Top 40)	51
Canada (Canadian Hot 100)	83
Germany (GfK)	90
Ireland (IRMA)	42
Lithuania (AGATA)	55
Norway (VG-lista)	11
Sweden (Sverigetopplistan)	23
Switzerland (Schweizer Hitparade)	25
UK Singles (OCC)	77
US Hot Dance/Electronic Songs (Billboard)	9

=== Year-end charts ===
Chart (2020)	Position
US Hot Dance/Electronic Songs (Billboard)	33

== Certifications ==
Region	Certification	Certified units/sales
Austria (IFPI Austria)	Gold	15,000^{‡}
New Zealand (RMNZ)	Gold	15,000^{‡}
^{‡} Sales+streaming figures based on certification alone.

== Release history ==
Region	Date	Format	Label
Various	17 April 2020	Digital download; streaming	Sony Music
