= Like It Is (song) =

2020 single by Kygo, Zara Larsson and Tyga

Single by Kygo, Zara Larsson and Tyga

from the album Golden Hour
- Released: 27 March 2020
- Genre: Tropical house
- Length: 3:03
- Label: Sony Music
- Composers: Kyrre Gørvell-Dahll; Nick Hodgson; Gerard O'Connell; Zara Larsson; Patrick Martin; Dua Lipa; Micheal Stevenson
- Producers: Kygo; Petey Martin

Kygo singles chronology
"Forever Yours (Tribute)" (2020)	"Like It Is" (2020)	"I'll Wait" (2020)

Zara Larsson singles chronology
"Invisible" (2019)	"Like It Is" (2020)	"Love Me Land" (2020)

Tyga singles chronology
"Ayy Macarena" (2019)	"Like It Is" (2020)	"Bored In The House" (2020)

Music video
- "Like It Is" on YouTube

"Like It Is" is a song by Norwegian DJ Kygo, Swedish singer Zara Larsson and American rapper Tyga. It was released through Sony Music on 27 March 2020 as the second single from Kygo's third studio album Golden Hour.

== Background ==
The song was originally written by English singer Dua Lipa alongside Ritual member Gerard O'Connell, former Kaiser Chiefs drummer/co-vocalist Nick Hodgson and Patrick Martin for her 2017 self-titled debut album. A snippet first appeared on her Instagram on 16 May 2019, with the full song leaking on 26 May. The song was bought by Kygo after the leak, who invited Zara Larsson and Tyga to collaborate on the track.

Kygo announced on social media on 24 March 2020 that his third studio album was finished, and that the lead single would be out on Friday of that week. Kygo also talked about spending time at home due to the COVID-19 pandemic and "staying positive in these tough times"; Dancing Astronaut felt that Kygo's announcement came at a time when those in self-quarantine are "hoping to bring some light during these dark quarantine days".

Hodgson later reflected on the song's creative process in a 2023 TikTok video.

== Critical reception ==
Farrell Sweeney of Dancing Astronaut wrote that the song features "enamoring vocals by Larsson, immediately pulling the listener into the catchy commercial fabric" of the song. Sweeney also felt that Tyga's rap verse after the first drop was "surprising" and gave the song an "unexpected twist".

== Music video ==
The video was released on 27 March 2020, and features Larsson and Tyga in an apartment building. It was called an "artistic and colorful visual accompaniment" by Sweeney.

== Charts ==
=== Weekly charts ===
Chart (2020)	Peak position
Australia (ARIA)	78
Austria (Ö3 Austria Top 40)	37
Belgium (Ultratop 50 Flanders)	39
Belgium (Ultratop 50 Wallonia)	32
Canadian Digital Songs (Billboard)	22
Croatia Airplay (HRT)	9
Czech Republic Singles Digital (ČNS IFPI)	46
Denmark (Tracklisten)	39
Estonia (Eesti Tipp-40)	33
Euro Digital Song Sales (Billboard)	9
Finland (Suomen virallinen lista)	20
France (SNEP)	167
France Digital Song Sales (Billboard)	10
Germany (GfK)	41
Greece (IFPI)	57
Hungary (Single Top 40)	17
Hungary (Stream Top 40)	28
Ireland (IRMA)	25
Latvia (LAIPA)	40
Lithuania (AGATA)	33
Netherlands (Single Top 100)	55
New Zealand Hot Singles (RMNZ)	4
Norway (VG-lista)	3
Poland Airplay (ZPAV)	5
Portugal (AFP)	136
Russia Airplay (TopHit)	233
Scottish Singles Sales (Official Charts)	23
Slovakia Singles Digital (ČNS IFPI)	48
Sweden (Sverigetopplistan)	4
Switzerland (Schweizer Hitparade)	9
Switzerland Digital Songs (Billboard)	1
UK Singles (Official Charts)	49
US Bubbling Under Hot 100 (Billboard)	13
US Digital Song Sales (Billboard)	15
US Hot Dance/Electronic Songs (Billboard)	5

=== Year-end charts ===
Chart (2020)	Position
Poland (ZPAV)	56
Sweden (Sverigetopplistan)	76
US Hot Dance/Electronic Songs (Billboard)	24

== Certifications ==
Region	Certification	Certified units/sales
Brazil (Pro-Música Brasil)	Gold	20,000^{‡}
Canada (Music Canada)	Platinum	80,000^{‡}
Mexico (AMPROFON)	Gold	30,000^{‡}
New Zealand (RMNZ)	Gold	15,000^{‡}
Norway (IFPI Norway)	Platinum	60,000^{‡}
Poland (ZPAV)	Gold	10,000^{‡}
United Kingdom (BPI)	Silver	200,000^{‡}
^{‡} Sales+streaming figures based on certification alone.
