= The Truth (Kygo song) =

Single by Kygo and Valerie Broussard

from the album Golden Hour
- Released: 22 May 2020
- Genre: Tropical house, electro house
- Length: 3:13
- Label: Sony Music
- Songwriter(s): Kyrre Gørvell-Dahll; Lena Leon; Valerie Broussard
- Producer(s): Kygo

Kygo singles chronology
| "Lose Somebody" (2020) | "The Truth" (2020) | "What's Love Got to Do with It" (2020) |

Valerie Broussard singles chronology
| "Don't Let Me Be Misunderstood" (2019) | "The Truth" (2020) |

"The Truth" is a song by Norwegian DJ Kygo and American singer Valerie Broussard. It was released through Sony Music on 22 May 2020 as the sixth single from Kygo's third studio album Golden Hour. The song was written by Kyrre Gørvell-Dahll, Lena Leon and Broussard.

== Personnel ==
Credits adapted from Tidal.

- Kyrre Gørvell-Dahll – producer, composer, lyricist, associated performer
- Lena Leon – composer, lyricist, vocal producer
- Valerie Broussard – composer, lyricist, associated performer, vocal engineer
- Myles Shear – executive producer
- Randy Merrill – mastering engineer
- Serban Ghenea – mixing engineer

== Charts ==
=== Weekly charts ===
| Chart (2020) | Peak position |
|---|---|
| Norway (VG-lista) | 28 |
| Sweden (Sverigetopplistan) | 61 |
| Switzerland (Schweizer Hitparade) | 63 |
| US Hot Dance/Electronic Songs (Billboard) | 11 |

=== Year-end charts ===
| Chart (2020) | Position |
|---|---|
| US Hot Dance/Electronic Songs (Billboard) | 87 |

== Release history ==
| Region | Date | Format | Label |
|---|---|---|---|
| Various | 22 May 2020 | Digital download; streaming | Sony Music |
