= Think About You (Kygo song) =

Single by Kygo featuring Valerie Broussard
- Released: 14 February 2019
- Length: 3:29
- Label: Sony; Ultra
- Songwriter(s): Kyrre Gørvell-Dahll; Valerie Broussard; Petey Martin; Aaron Espe
- Producer(s): Kyrre Gørvell-Dahll; Petey Martin

Kygo singles chronology
"Happy Now" (2018)	"Think About You" (2019)	"Carry On" (2019)

Valerie Broussard singles chronology
"Awaken" (2019)	"Think About You" (2019)	"Deeper" (2019)

Music video
- "Think About You" on YouTube

"Think About You" is a song by Norwegian DJ Kygo featuring American singer Valerie Broussard. It was released as a single on 14 February 2019, and considered timed for Valentine's Day.

== Promotion ==
Kygo initially posted a teaser of the song on 11 February; Billboard described the clip as a visually "glitchy" teaser with the song's "melodic guitar line" heard through a "roaring wind". Kygo later shared the cover art and the release date. Your EDM felt it would be a song "typical of [Kygo's] core sound".

== Music video ==
The music video was directed by Sarah Bahbah and released on February 22, 2019. It features a couple. Dylan Sprouse as Jax and Khadijha Red Thunder as Ariel, who have broken up recently, through the lens of a silent film about their relationship. Rob Raco also guest stars in the music video.

== Charts ==
=== Weekly charts ===
Chart (2019)	Peak position
Austria (Ö3 Austria Top 40)	61
Belgium (Ultratip Bubbling Under Flanders)	3
Belgium (Ultratip Bubbling Under Wallonia)	25
Canada (Canadian Hot 100)	74
Czech Republic (Singles Digitál Top 100)	44
Germany (GfK)	67
Hungary (Stream Top 40)	32
Ireland (IRMA)	42
Lithuania (AGATA)	23
Netherlands (Dutch Top 40)	26
New Zealand Hot Singles (RMNZ)	13
Norway (VG-lista)	5
Scotland (OCC)	79
Slovakia (Rádio Top 100)	58
Slovakia (Singles Digitál Top 100)	27
Sweden (Sverigetopplistan)	12
Switzerland (Schweizer Hitparade)	32
UK Singles (OCC)	82
US Hot Dance/Electronic Songs (Billboard)	10

=== Year-end charts ===
Chart (2019)	Position
US Hot Dance/Electronic Songs (Billboard)	44

== Certifications ==
Region	Certification	Certified units/sales
Canada (Music Canada)	Platinum	80,000^{‡}
^{‡} Sales+streaming figures based on certification alone.
