= Sam Tinnesz =

- Born: Samuel Anton Tinnesz; April 12, 1985 (age 41); Nashville, Tennessee, United States
- Genres: Pop rock; pop; alternative rock
- Occupations: Musician; multi-instrumentalist; songwriter; record producer
- Website: samtinnesz.com

Samuel Anton Tinnesz (/tɪnɛz/ TIN-ez) is an American singer and songwriter.

== Biography ==
Sam Tinnesz was born on April 12, 1985 in Nashville, Tennessee. His father, James M. Tinnesz (1960 - 1993) served as a pilot in the United States Air Force. James died in July 1993 when Tinnesz was only 8 years old.

Tinnesz would debut on October 14, 2015 with his single When the Truth Hunts you Down and would then release his debut album Babel on August 25, 2017.

Sam Tinnesz is based in Nashville, Tennessee and signed through Warner Music Group’s ADA.

Tinnesz was featured in the song “Don't Give Up On Love” with Kygo which reached a Billboard top position of 35, spending 2 weeks on the charts with a peak date of June 12, 2020.

Tinnesz is a gamer. His song “Wolves” was used in a commercial for Apex Legends and his song “Fire It Up” (feat. Ruelle) was used in the 2019 Xbox E3 trailer.

Tinnesz's song 'Indestructible' was used in the British Gameshow Gladiators as the theme for Hammer (Tom Wilson)

== Collaborations ==
Sam Tinnesz has collaborated with Yacht Money, Ruelle, Fleurie, Tommee Profitt, Kygo, Timmy Trumpet, Banners, Daniella Mason, Manafest and Our Last Night.

== Discography ==
Albums

- Babel (2017)
- White Doves (2020) (EP)
- Warplanes EP (2020)
- White Dove + Warplanes (Deluxe) (2020)
- There Goes the Neighborhood (2023)
- The Fall (2025)

== Film and television placements ==
Movie/Show title	Song title	Air Date	Ref.
Batwoman	"Human"	October 13, 2019	
Riverdale	"Far From Home (The Raven)"	May 9, 2018	
America's Got Talent	"Caught in the Fire"	September 14, 2021	
