= Kem kan eg ringe =

Single by Kygo featuring Store P and Lars Vaular
- Released: 14 June 2019
- Recorded: 2019
- Length: 3:18
- Label: Sony Music
- Songwriters: Kyrre Gørvell-Dahll; Lars Nesheim Vaular; Mikkel Storleer Eriksen; Petter Skarre Sundby; Tor Erik Hermansen
- Producer: Kygo

Kygo singles chronology
"Not OK" (2019)	"Kem kan eg ringe" (2019)	"Higher Love" (2019)

"Kem kan eg ringe" (Norwegian: "Who Can I Call") is a song performed by Norwegian DJ Kygo, featuring Norwegian rappers Store P and Lars Vaular and performed in the Bergen dialect. The song was released as a digital download on 14 June 2019 by Sony Music. The song peaked at number three on the Norwegian Singles Chart. The song was written by Kyrre Gørvell-Dahll, Lars Nesheim Vaular, Mikkel Storleer Eriksen, Petter Skarre Sundby and Tor Erik Hermansen.

== Charts ==
Chart performance of "Kem kan eg ringe"
Chart (2019)	Peak position
Norway (VG-lista)	3
