= What's Love Got to Do with It (song) =

1984 single by Tina Turner

- Artwork for US and Canadian 7-inch vinyl single, also used for early vinyl releases of the parent album

Single by Tina Turner

from the album Private Dancer
- B-side: "Rock and Roll Widow" (US); "Don't Rush the Good Things" (UK)
- Released: May 1984
- Recorded: 1984
- Studio: Mayfair Studios (London, England)
- Genre: Pop rock; R&B
- Length: 3:48
- Label: Capitol
- Songwriters: Graham Lyle; Terry Britten
- Producer: Terry Britten

Tina Turner singles chronology
"Help!" (1984)	"What's Love Got to Do with It" (1984)	"Better Be Good to Me" (1984)

Audio sample
- What's Love Got to Do with It: file; help

Music video
- "What's Love Got to Do with It" on YouTube
- "What's Love Got to Do with It" (alternative video) on YouTube

"What's Love Got to Do with It" is a song written by Graham Lyle and Terry Britten, and recorded by Tina Turner for her fifth studio album, Private Dancer (1984). Capitol Records released it as a single from Private Dancer in May 1984 and it eventually became Turner's biggest-selling single.

Although Turner had already scored a late-1983 top 30 hit with her rendition of Al Green's "Let's Stay Together", "What's Love Got to Do with It" became her biggest hit single on the Billboard Hot 100, reaching #1 and selling over 2,000,000 copies worldwide. At the time, aged 44, Turner became the oldest solo female artist to top the Hot 100. It was the second-biggest single of 1984 in the United States and the 17th-biggest in the United Kingdom, where it peaked at number three on the UK Singles Chart. "What's Love Got to Do with It" received three awards at the 27th Annual Grammy Awards: Record of the Year, Song of the Year, and Best Female Pop Vocal Performance. In 1993, the song's title was used as the title for the biographical film based on Turner's life.

In 2003, it was included in VH1's list of the "100 Best Songs of the Past 25 Years". In 2012, "What's Love Got to Do with It" was inducted into the Grammy Hall of Fame, marking Turner's third Grammy Hall of Fame award. The song ranked number 309 on Rolling Stone's list of the "500 Greatest Songs of All Time" and at number 134 in their 2021 updated list. It also ranked number 38 on RIAA's "Songs of the Century" list. Several musical artists have covered "What's Love Got to Do with It" and experienced commercial success with their renditions. American rapper Warren G released a hip hop version in 1996, and in July 2020, Norwegian DJ and producer Kygo released a remix of the song.

== Background and recording ==
The song was written by Terry Britten and Graham Lyle, who originally offered it to Cliff Richard, but it was rejected. Some months before Turner recorded the song, the British pop group Bucks Fizz were offered it. Member Jay Aston asked to sing lead on the track after hearing the demo, but was told by the producer that it was unsuitable for a female lead vocal. The group went on to record it in February 1984, but sung by male member Bobby G. Aston recalls the demo was very similar to the eventual Tina Turner version, but their finished version was in a very different style. It was intended for possible inclusion on their next album I Hear Talk but was shelved when Turner released her version first. The Bucks Fizz version went unreleased until it was included on a re-issue of their Are You Ready album in 2000. The Original Bucks Fizz included the song in their reunion concert tour in October 2009.

== Composition ==
The sheet music for the song shows the key of G♯ minor in common time with a suggested tempo of "moderate groove" at 98 beats per minute. Turner's vocal range in the song spans from the low note of D♯_{3} to the high note of D♭_{5}

== Critical reception ==
Mark Millan of The Daily Vault described "What's Love Got to Do with It" as "three minutes and 48 seconds of pop perfection". He noted that it is a "soft synth-driven track countered by Turner's battle weary voice, barely hiding the cynic in her", and stated that the song "reeks of attitude". A reviewer from People Magazine noted "the sophisticated pop" of the song, adding that it has "the characteristic flair and energy that have made Tina the envy of every singer this side of Aretha."

== Chart performance ==
Until the release of "What's Love Got to Do with It", Tina Turner had not had a US top-ten single since the early 1970s. The single went to number one on the US Billboard Hot 100 and remained there for three weeks, giving Turner her first and only solo number-one hit in the U.S. Turner was 44 when the song hit number one, at the time making her the oldest female solo artist to place a number-one single on the US Hot 100. The song also spent five weeks at number two on the Billboard Hot Black Singles chart, from July 14 to August 18, 1984, "When Doves Cry", by Prince, being the reason it never reached its number-one spot. At the end of the year, the song was ranked the second-best-performing song of 1984 on the Billboard Year-End Hot 100, behind the aforementioned "When Doves Cry".

Worldwide, the song did well on the music charts, reaching number one in Australia and Canada. It peaked at number three in New Zealand and on the UK Singles Chart, becoming her highest-charting single on the latter chart alongside "River Deep – Mountain High" and "We Don't Need Another Hero (Thunderdome)". Elsewhere, the song reached the top 10 in many European countries, including the top five in Ireland, Sweden, and Austria. It also reached number two in South Africa.

== Music video ==
The accompanying music video for "What's Love Got to Do with It" features Turner walking down the street in a leather miniskirt, engaging with the public, intercut with scenes where she is singing directly to camera. The video was shot in New York City during the spring of 1984. Pamela Springsteen, Bruce Springsteen's sister from Sleepaway Camp 2, makes an appearance as a street dancer along with Vanessa Bell Calloway, who would later portray the fictional character of Jackie (Turner's friend) in the 1993 film What's Love Got to Do with It. A 12 year-old Tupac Shakur appears as a background extra. The video was directed by John Mark Robinson.

An alternate black-and-white video directed by Bud Schaetzle features Tina singing the song against a black background while couples argue in a bar.

== Accolades ==
In February 1985, the song received three awards at the Grammy Awards Record of the Year, Song of the Year, and Best Female Pop Vocal Performance. Turner's live performance of the song at the Grammy show was released on the 1994 album Grammy's Greatest Moments Volume I.

The music video for the song claimed a prize at the MTV Video Music Awards in 1985 for "Best Female Video".

In 2012, "What's Love Got to Do with It" was inducted into the Grammy Hall of Fame.

== Legacy and impact ==
The name of the song was used as the title of the 1993 biopic based on Turner's life. In 1996, rapper Warren G collaborated with R&B singer Adina Howard to release a hit single of the same name, which sampled and interpolated Turner's original. The first line of the song's chorus was interpolated in the 2002 song "What's Luv?" by rapper Fat Joe and R&B singer Ashanti. In 2003, "What's Love Got to Do with It" was included in VH1's list of the "100 Best Songs of the Past 25 Years". In 2009, it was ranked number 74 on Entertainment Weekly's "The 100 Greatest Summer Songs". It was ranked number 309 on Rolling Stone's list of the "500 Greatest Songs of All Time" and at number 134 in their 2021 updated list. In 2018, a cover of the song was released as a non-album single by singer La'Porsha Renae. Mickey Guyton performed the song at the 2021 Rock and Roll Hall of Fame Induction Ceremony. In 2022 Mattel released a Barbie doll in Turner's likeness, designed by Bill Greening, to commemorate the song. In 2023, American hard rock band Black Stone Cherry released a cover of the song as a non-album single in honor of Turner's passing, with proceeds from the sale of the single being donated to organizations supporting domestic violence awareness. The track was also released as a single by XY&O (a group formed by Skip Curtis, Tudor Davies and Nick Kelly) on March 10, 2017.

== Personnel ==
Personnel are sourced from Sound on Sound.

- Tina Turner – lead vocals
- Terry Britten – electric rhythm guitars, bass guitar, LinnDrum, background vocals
- Nick Glennie-Smith – Yamaha DX7, E-mu Emulator II, Roland MKS-80 Super Jupiter, Oberheim OB-8, Fairlight CMI
- Billy Livsey – Yamaha DX7 (synth harmonica solo)
- Simon Morton – percussion
- Tessa Niles – background vocals

Production

- Terry Britten – producer
- John Hudson – engineering and mixing

== Charts ==
=== Weekly charts ===
1984 weekly chart performance for "What's Love Got to Do with It"
Chart (1984)	Peak position
Australia (Kent Music Report)	1
Austria (Ö3 Austria Top 40)	4
Belgium (Ultratop 50 Flanders)	20
Canada Top Singles (RPM)	1
Canada Adult Contemporary (RPM)	7
Canada (The Record)	1
Europe (European Top 100)	9
Finland (Suomen virallinen lista)	26
France (IFOP)	8
Guatemala (UPI)	3
Ireland (IRMA)	4
Italy (Musica e dischi)	16
Netherlands (Dutch Top 40)	15
Netherlands (Single Top 100)	10
New Zealand (Recorded Music NZ)	3
Norway (VG-lista)	10
Paraguay (UPI)	2
Peru (UPI)	8
South Africa (Springbok Radio)	2
Spain (PROMUSICAE)	6
Sweden (Sverigetopplistan)	4
Switzerland (Schweizer Hitparade)	8
UK Singles (Official Charts)	3
US Billboard Hot 100	1
US Adult Contemporary (Billboard)	8
US Dance/Disco Top 80 (Billboard)	21
US Hot Black Singles (Billboard)	2
US Cash Box Top 100	1
Venezuela (UPI)	10
West Germany (GfK)	7

2015–2025 weekly chart performance for "What's Love Got to Do with It"
Chart (2015–2025)	Peak position
Bolivia Airplay (Monitor Latino)	6
France (SNEP)	21
Global 200 (Billboard)	151
Ireland (IRMA)	81
Israel International Airplay (Media Forest)	15
Japan Hot Overseas (Billboard Japan)	10

=== Year-end charts ===
1984 year-end chart performance for "What's Love Got to Do with It"
Chart (1984)	Position
Australia (Kent Music Report)	22
Canada Top Singles (RPM)	3
New Zealand (RIANZ)	13
Netherlands (Single Top 100)	76
UK Singles (OCC)	20
US Billboard Hot 100	2
US Adult Contemporary (Billboard)	50
US Hot Black Singles (Billboard)	3
US Cash Box Top 100	2
West Germany (Media Control)	35

1985 year-end chart performance for "What's Love Got to Do with It"
Chart (1985)	Position
South Africa (Springbok Radio)	14

=== Decade-end charts ===
Decade-end chart performance for "What's Love Got to Do with It"
Chart (1980–1989)	Position
US Billboard Hot 100	20

== Certifications ==
Region	Certification	Certified units/sales
Canada (Music Canada)	Platinum	100,000^{^}
Denmark (IFPI Danmark)	Platinum	90,000^{‡}
New Zealand (RMNZ)	2× Platinum	60,000^{‡}
Spain (Promusicae)	Platinum	60,000^{‡}
United Kingdom (BPI) 1984 physical sales	Silver	250,000^{^}
United Kingdom (BPI) sales + streams since 2004	2× Platinum	1,200,000^{‡}
United States (RIAA)	Gold	1,000,000^{^}
^{^} Shipments figures based on certification alone.^{‡} Sales+streaming figures based on certification alone.

== Kygo version ==
"What's Love Got to Do with It"

Single by Kygo and Tina Turner
- Released: July 17, 2020
- Recorded: 1984 (Turner's vocals): 2019 (Kygo's arrangement)
- Genre: Tropical house
- Length: 3:28
- Label: Sony
- Songwriters: Kyrre Gørvell-Dahll; Graham Lyle; Terry Britten
- Producer: Kygo

Kygo singles chronology
"The Truth" (2020)	"What's Love Got to Do with It" (2020)	"Hot Stuff" (2020)

Tina Turner singles chronology
"I'm Ready" (2008)	"What's Love Got to Do with It" (2020)

Music video
- "What's Love Got to Do with It" on YouTube

A remix of the song was released as a single by Norwegian DJ and record producer Kygo and Tina Turner. The song was released on July 17, 2020. This was the last release by Turner before her death in May 2023. It marks Kygo's second remix released as a single following "Higher Love" (2019).

=== Background ===
Talking about the song, Kygo said, "'What's Love Got To Do With It?' is one of my all time favourite songs and it feels surreal to get the opportunity to work with such a legendary artist. Can't wait for you all to hear it!" He also said in a statement, "I couldn't be more excited to collaborate with Tina Turner, who is an icon that I grew up listening to. 'What's Love Got To Do With It' is one of my all-time favorite songs so to have a chance to rework it has been a very special moment in my career. I love working around timeless vocals and although it's challenging to preserve elements of the original track and adding my own touch, I'm extremely happy with how it turned out!"

=== Music video ===
A music video to accompany the release of "What's Love Got to Do with It" was first released onto YouTube on July 16, 2020. The video is directed by Sarah Bahbah and features Laura Harrier and Charles Michael Davis as star-crossed lovers who, despite looking on paper as having a strong and playful relationship, behind the scenes the couple lacks a deep emotional connection to last. In the end, one of them must walk away.

=== Personnel ===
Personnel are adapted from Tidal.

- Kyrre Gørvell-Dahll – producer, composer, associated performer, lyricist
- Graham Lyle – lyricist
- Terry Britten – lyricist
- Tina Turner – associated performer, lead vocals
- Randy Merrill – mastering engineer
- Serban Ghenea – mixing engineer

=== Charts ===
==== Weekly charts ====
Chart (2020)	Peak position
Australia (ARIA)	95
Austria (Ö3 Austria Top 40)	23
Belgium (Ultratop 50 Flanders)	12
Belgium (Ultratop 50 Wallonia)	6
Canada Hot 100 (Billboard)	52
CIS Airplay (TopHit)	133
Czech Republic Singles Digital (ČNS IFPI)	44
Czech Republic Airplay (ČNS IFPI)	57
Croatia International Airplay (Top lista)	1
El Salvador (Monitor Latino)	10
France (SNEP)	120
Germany (GfK)	26
Germany Airplay (BVMI)	1
Hungary (Dance Top 40)	15
Hungary (Rádiós Top 40)	2
Hungary (Single Top 40)	4
Iceland (Tónlistinn)	10
Ireland (IRMA)	31
Mexico Airplay (Billboard)	19
Netherlands (Dutch Top 40)	19
Netherlands (Single Top 100)	58
New Zealand Hot Singles (RMNZ)	8
Norway (VG-lista)	4
Poland Airplay (ZPAV)	1
Romania (Airplay 100)	19
Scottish Singles Sales (Official Charts)	3
Slovakia Airplay (ČNS IFPI)	3
Slovakia Singles Digital (ČNS IFPI)	28
Slovenia (SloTop50)	4
Sweden (Sverigetopplistan)	7
Switzerland (Schweizer Hitparade)	6
UK Singles (Official Charts)	31
US Bubbling Under Hot 100 (Billboard)	1
US Adult Contemporary (Billboard)	20
US Hot Dance/Electronic Songs (Billboard)	7

2024 Weekly chart performance for "What's Love Got to Do with It"
Chart (2024)	Peak position
Estonia Airplay (TopHit)	77
Lithuania Airplay (TopHit)	88

==== Year-end charts ====
Chart (2020)	Position
Belgium (Ultratop Flanders)	89
Belgium (Ultratop Wallonia)	100
Hungary (Dance Top 40)	66
Hungary (Rádiós Top 40)	73
Hungary (Single Top 40)	82
Netherlands (Dutch Top 40)	100
Poland (ZPAV)	39
Switzerland (Schweizer Hitparade)	66
US Hot Dance/Electronic Songs (Billboard)	37

Chart (2021)	Position
Poland (ZPAV)	79

2024 year-end chart performance for "What's Love Got to Do with It"
Chart (2024)	Position
Estonia Airplay (TopHit)	113
Lithuania Airplay (TopHit)	76

2025 year-end chart performance for "What's Love Got to Do with It"
Chart (2025)	Position
Lithuania Airplay (TopHit)	88

=== Certifications ===
Region	Certification	Certified units/sales
Austria (IFPI Austria)	Platinum	30,000^{‡}
Canada (Music Canada)	Gold	40,000^{‡}
Denmark (IFPI Danmark)	Gold	45,000^{‡}
Germany (BVMI)	Gold	200,000^{‡}
New Zealand (RMNZ)	Gold	15,000^{‡}
Poland (ZPAV)	Platinum	20,000^{‡}
Spain (Promusicae)	Gold	30,000^{‡}
Switzerland (IFPI Switzerland)	Gold	10,000^{‡}
United Kingdom (BPI)	Silver	200,000^{‡}
^{‡} Sales+streaming figures based on certification alone.

== See also ==
- List of Billboard Hot 100 number-one singles of 1984
- List of number-one singles of 2020 (Poland)
