= Carry On (Kygo and Rita Ora song) =

2019 single by Kygo and Rita Ora

Single by Kygo and Rita Ora
- Released: 19 April 2019
- Genre: Dance-pop; tropical house
- Length: 3:35
- Label: Palm Tree; RCA
- Songwriters: Josh Cumbee; Natalie Dunn; Kyrre Gørvell-Dahll; Rita Sahatçiu Ora; Ilan Kidron; Afshin Salmani
- Producers: Kygo; Josh Cumbee; Afsheen

Kygo singles chronology
"Think About You" (2019)	"Carry On" (2019)	"Not OK" (2019)

Rita Ora singles chronology
"R.I.P." (2019)	"Carry On" (2019)	"Ritual" (2019)

Music video
- "Carry On" on YouTube

"Carry On" is a song by Norwegian DJ and producer Kygo and British singer Rita Ora, released as a standalone single for the 2019 film, Pokémon Detective Pikachu. The song plays during the end credits of the film. "Carry On" was released on 19 April 2019, through RCA Records. The music video was released on the same day.

== Background and composition ==
"Carry On" was written by Kygo, Rita Ora, Ilan Kidron, Natalie Dunn, Josh Cumbee and Afshin Salmani. According to Dunn and Kidron, they began writing the song in 2016 and the initial version of the song was recorded by several singers, including Kelly Rowland, Dua Lipa (featuring Swae Lee) and Charlie Puth. Ora later recorded the song with Kygo, after adding a bridge. At the time, Ora was working on the Pokémon film Detective Pikachu, and the song would go on to be featured in the end credits of the film.

EDM.com's Katie Stone wrote that "as the song progresses into the first instrumental build" an "airy tropical house beat" is introduced which "pairs beautifully with the top line." Stone also wrote that Ora's vocals get "pitched up and overlayed, creating a vibey track." The music site Run the Trap described the song as "melancholic."

== Reception ==
John Frisica of Nintendo Enthusiast wrote that the song is "pretty chill and ethereal." Katie Stone from EDM.com praised Ora's singing as "soulful" and thought that "it's only fitting she would be included on the original soundtrack" since she appears in the film. Becca Longmire of ET Canada called the song "catchy."

== Music video ==
While announcing the song's release on Twitter on 15 April 2019, Ora accompanied the post with film stills which the Wisconsin Gazette described as her "channelling" Detective Pikachu. The music video for the song was released on YouTube four days later, on 19 April. Directed by Jonathan Singer-Vine and produced by Colin Tilley, the video intersperses scenes from Pokémon Detective Pikachu.

Rolling Stone wrote that the video is "set in the world of the film" and added that "Ora sports a Pikachu-yellow trenchcoat while driving around a dark city, as clips of Detective Pikachu play alongside her."

== Track listing ==
- Digital download
1. "Carry On (from the Original Motion Picture "POKÉMON Detective Pikachu")" – 3:35
- Digital download – Remixes
1. "Carry On" (Nicky Romero Remix) – 2:55

== Charts ==
=== Weekly charts ===
Chart (2019)	Peak position
Australia (ARIA)	43
Australia Dance (ARIA)	3
Austria (Ö3 Austria Top 40)	47
Belgium (Ultratop 50 Flanders)	40
Belgium (Ultratip Bubbling Under Wallonia)	4
Canada Hot 100 (Billboard)	61
China Airplay/FL (Billboard)	15
Croatia (HRT)	25
Czech Republic Airplay (ČNS IFPI)	40
Czech Republic Singles Digital (ČNS IFPI)	28
Denmark (Tracklisten)	34
Estonia (Eesti Tipp-40)	26
France (SNEP)	104
Germany (GfK)	46
Hungary (Rádiós Top 40)	19
Hungary (Stream Top 40)	22
Ireland (IRMA)	15
Latvia (LAIPA)	23
Lithuania (AGATA)	13
Mexico Airplay (Billboard)	33
Netherlands (Dutch Top 40)	17
Netherlands (Mega Top 50)	41
Netherlands (Single Top 100)	35
New Zealand Hot Singles (RMNZ)	6
Norway (VG-lista)	7
Poland Airplay (ZPAV)	5
Scottish Singles Sales (Official Charts)	25
Slovakia Singles Digital (ČNS IFPI)	16
Sweden (Sverigetopplistan)	14
Switzerland (Schweizer Hitparade)	28
UK Singles (Official Charts)	26
US Hot Dance/Electronic Songs (Billboard)	7

=== Year-end charts ===
Chart (2019)	Position
Hungary (Rádiós Top 40)	67
Poland (Polish Airplay Top 100)	66
US Hot Dance/Electronic Songs (Billboard)	28

== Certifications ==
Region	Certification	Certified units/sales
Australia (ARIA)	Gold	35,000^{‡}
Canada (Music Canada)	Gold	40,000^{‡}
Denmark (IFPI Danmark)	Gold	45,000^{‡}
Mexico (AMPROFON)	Gold	30,000^{‡}
New Zealand (RMNZ)	Gold	15,000^{‡}
Poland (ZPAV)	Platinum	20,000^{‡}
Switzerland (IFPI Switzerland)	Gold	10,000^{‡}
United Kingdom (BPI)	Gold	400,000^{‡}
^{‡} Sales+streaming figures based on certification alone.

== Release history ==
Region	Date	Format	Label	Ref.
Various	19 April 2019	Digital download; streaming	RCA	
United States	14 May 2019	Contemporary hit radio	RCA	
