= Valerie Broussard =

American singer

- Born: February 10, 1991 (age 35); Philadelphia
- Occupations: Singer, Music Production
- Known for: Think About You, Awaken, Drive, Sideways
- Notable work: Don't Let Me Be Misunderstood, Paint It Black,

Valerie Broussard (born 10 February 1991; (/væləri bruˈsɑːrd/) is an American singer and songwriter. Her works, in collaboration with other artists, have appeared in theme tunes for television shows. She released the single "Sideways" in collaboration with Illenium which became a top ten hit on the Billboard Hot Dance / Electronic chart in May 2021.

In August 2017, a fan of the book series “Six of Crows” by Leigh Bardugo posted an animation to Youtube using Broussard’s song, “Trouble”. It gained significant popularity and the song was largely recognized by the fans of the books as the song most associated with the books. In July of 2024, Broussard acknowledged this in an Instagram reel posted to her account.

== Biography ==
Valerie Broussard was born and raised in Philadelphia, regularly performing in theatre. She moved to London aged 18, and became interested in classical opera before beginning songwriting. One of her early influences was Goo Goo Dolls' "Iris", particularly its music video, which she later covered with her own video. She has since collaborated with the group, singing on "Money, Fame & Fortune" on the album Miracle Pill.

Several of her songs have appeared as theme music for TV shows, including Luther, Chilling Adventures of Sabrina and Riverdale. Her cover of "Don't Let Me Be Misunderstood", originally released in November 2019, was used as the theme for the Alibi (and later BBC One) show Traces. She has also collaborated with DJ and producer Kygo, singing on his compositions "Think About You" and "The Truth", and with Ray Chen on the track "Awaken", used in the 2019 release of League of Legends.

In 2019, she was signed to Palm Tree Records and RCA Records, and collaborated with Lindsey Stirling on the song "Deeper". In May 2021, she released the single "Sideways" in collaboration with Illenium, about a friend facing mental health difficulties during the COVID-19 pandemic. It became a top ten hit on the Billboard Hot Dance / Electronic chart. Her cover of "Iris" includes a video that acknowledges the original, changing themes from being locked in a tower to looking at the world from a spaceship. She has said, "I wanted to give an homage to theirs." She released her debut EP, Voyager that summer, with an accompanying single, "Drive".

== Charts ==
- "Roots" – No. 25 Billboard Dance chart, October 21, 2019
- "Sideways" – No. 10 Billboard Dance/Electronic chart, May 22, 2021
