= Rhys Lewis (musician) =

British singer-songwriter

- Born: 18 March 1993 (age 33); Oxford, Oxfordshire, England
- Education: LCCM
- Occupations: Singer-songwriter; multi-instrumentalist
- Years active: 2016–present
- Musical career
- Genres: Neo soul; soul; pop; blues; Americana; folk
- Instruments: Vocals; piano; guitar; clarinet; recorder
- Label: Decca
- Website: rhyslewisofficial.com

Rhys Lewis (born March 18, 1991) is a British singer-songwriter and multi-instrumentalist signed to Decca Records. His debut studio album Things I Chose to Remember was released in July 2020. His second studio album Corner of the Sky was released on 20 January 2023.

== Early life ==
Rhys Lewis was born in Oxford to parents who were both teachers. He has two brothers; one older, Tom, and a twin, George. George is the older twin, making Rhys the youngest in his family. Lewis was educated at Bartholomew School in Eynsham and first started performing in a cover band with his brother. He also worked as a 'dinner lady' at Cokethorpe School. At 19, Lewis moved to London to attend the London Centre of Contemporary Music.

== Artistry ==
=== Influences ===
Lewis cites Alex Turner of Arctic Monkeys as his songwriting inspiration, commenting that "[Turner] was the first songwriter of my generation to make the lyrics of a song jump out at me." Other influences include Led Zeppelin and Bill Withers, in particular, the latter's song "Lean On Me".

=== Musical style and songwriting ===
Lewis' debut album, Things I Chose to Remember, is distinctive in that it was made on analogue tape. Lewis stated his reasons for this as “[analogue tape] forces you to think clearly and in detail about every single part that goes down, and how you can make each part do the most it can”. Numerous critics have commented on the soul and blues influences in his music.

Lewis writes songs about a variety of aspects of his life. In Things I Chose to Remember, topics include the portrayal of men in the media, mental health and his own relationships. Many of his songs are about heartbreak, including "When Was The Last Time", "Be Your Man" and "Hurting". He says he finds his song "No Right To Love You" difficult to perform because it also deals with a personal heartbreak. "I suppose the song is a bit of a trigger for lots of memories and emotions of the breakup … every so often it really hits me again, and the emotion of the song comes flooding back."

== Discography ==
=== Studio albums ===
Title	Details
Things I Chose to Remember	Released: 10 July 2020; Label: Decca Records; Format: CD, digital download, streaming, Vinyl
Corner of the Sky	Released: 20 January 2023; Label: Decca Records; Format: CD, digital download, streaming, Vinyl

=== EP ===
Title	Details
Bad Timing	Released: 23 February 2018; Label: Decca Records; Format: CD, digital download, streaming
In Between Minds	Released: 26 April 2019; Label: Decca Records; Format: CD, digital download, streaming
Stranger	Released: 17 October 2025; Label: Believe; Format: CD, digital download, streaming
