= Not OK (Kygo and Chelsea Cutler song) =

Single by Kygo and Chelsea Cutler
- Released: 23 May 2019
- Recorded: 2019
- Genre: Tropical house; dance-pop
- Length: 3:30
- Label: Sony Music
- Songwriters: Leah Haywood; Daniel James; David Brook; Rob Ellmore; Kyrre Gørvell-Dahll; Chelsea Emily Cutler
- Producers: Dreamlab; Ruffian; Kygo

Kygo singles chronology
"Carry On" (2019)	"Not OK" (2019)	"Kem kan eg ringe" (2019)

"Not OK" is a song performed by Norwegian DJ Kygo and American singer Chelsea Cutler. The song was released as a digital download on 23 May 2019 by Sony Music. The song peaked at number seven on the Norwegian Singles Chart. The song was written by Leah Haywood, Daniel James, David Brook, Rob Ellmore, Kyrre Gørvell-Dahll and Chelsea Emily Cutler.

== Track listing ==
Digital download
No.	Title	Length
1.	"Not OK"	3:30

Digital download – Frank Walker Remix
No.	Title	Length
1.	"Not OK" (Frank Walker Remix)	3:03

== Charts ==
=== Weekly charts ===
Weekly chart performance for "Not OK"
Chart (2019–2020)	Peak position
Australia (ARIA)	99
Lithuania (AGATA)	38
Norway (VG-lista)	7
Slovakia Airplay (ČNS IFPI)	29
Sweden (Sverigetopplistan)	27
Switzerland (Schweizer Hitparade)	47
US Hot Dance/Electronic Songs (Billboard)	9

=== Year-end charts ===
Year-end chart performance for "Not OK"
Chart (2019)	Position
US Hot Dance/Electronic Songs (Billboard)	48

== Release history ==
Release history and formats for "Not OK"
Region	Date	Format	Label
Norway	23 May 2019	Digital download; streaming	Sony Music
