= List of certified songs in South Korea =

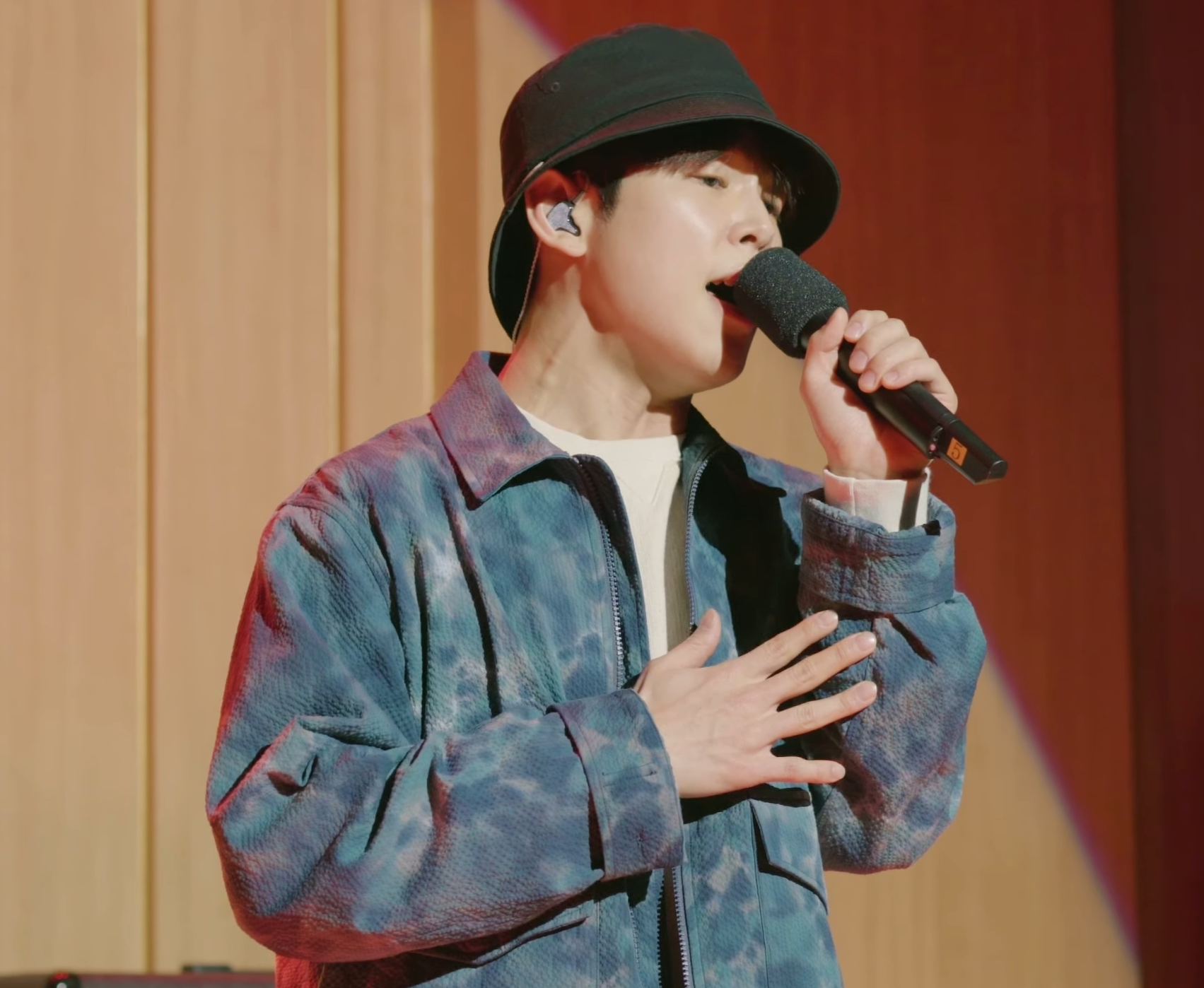
Paul Kim's "Every Day, Every Moment" is the highest certified song in South Korea. It has been certified 3× platinum for streaming and 2× platinum for download.

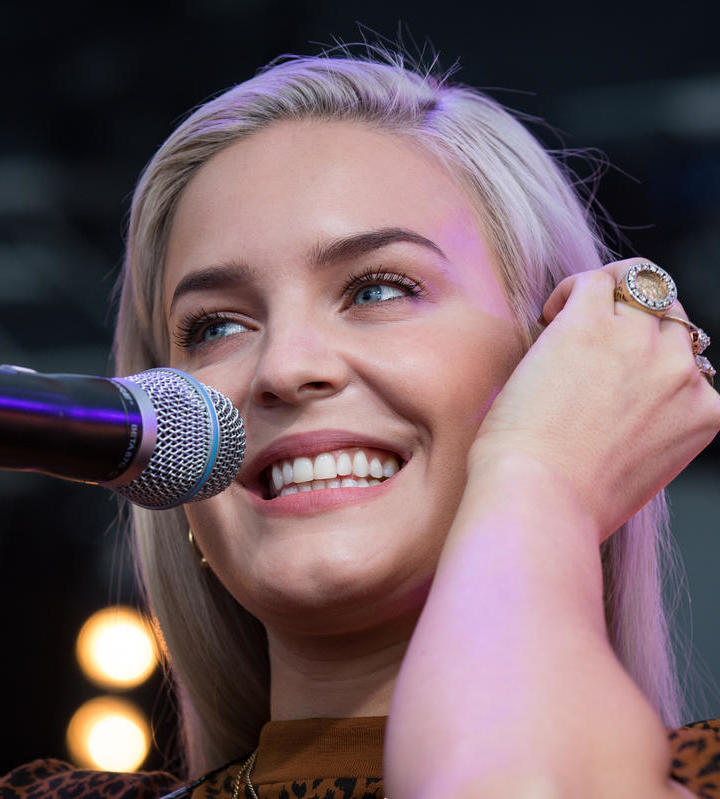
Anne-Marie's "2002" was the first non-Korean language song to be certified.

Since 2018, 230 songs have been certified in South Korea in accordance with the certification levels set up by the Korea Music Content Association (KMCA). Established in 2008, the KMCA introduced the official South Korean charts in 2010 and record certifications were implemented in April 2018. Every song released after January 1, 2018, is eligible for a certification. The KMCA divides certification for songs in streaming and downloads. For songs released before 2018, Gaon published the Gaon Observation Board that record songs that reach 100 million streams and 2.5 million downloads.

The first song to be certified Platinum for both streams and downloads was iKon's "Love Scenario" in June and November 2018. Paul Kim's "Every Day, Every Moment" is the highest certified song in both categories. Anne-Marie's "2002" was the first non-Korean language song to be certified.

== Certification levels ==
Thresholds per award
Streaming
Platinum	2× Platinum	3× Platinum (Note: Higher certifications (up to 9× Platinum) will also be awarded.)	Billion
100,000,000	200,000,000	300,000,000	1,000,000,000
Download
Platinum	2× Platinum	3× Platinum	Diamond
2,500,000	5,000,000	7,500,000	10,000,000

== Certified songs ==
Song	Artist(s)	Certification		Release date	Certification date	
Song	Artist(s)	Streaming	Download	Release date	Streaming	Download
"Love Scenario" (사랑을 했다)	iKon	2× Platinum	Platinum	Jan 25, 2018	May 11, 2023	Nov 8, 2018
"Bboom Bboom" (뿜뿜)	Momoland	Platinum	Platinum	Jan 3, 2018	Aug 9, 2018	Jul 11, 2019
"You"	MeloMance	Platinum	Platinum	Jan 22, 2018	Nov 8, 2018	Jul 11, 2019
"Only Then" (그때 헤어지면 돼)	Roy Kim	Platinum	Platinum	Feb 12, 2018	Nov 8, 2018	Mar 7, 2019
"Starry Night" (별이 빛나는 밤)	Mamamoo	Platinum	Platinum	Mar 7, 2018	Nov 8, 2018	Jul 11, 2019
"Every day, Every Moment" (모든 날, 모든 순간)	Paul Kim	3× Platinum	2× Platinum	Mar 20, 2018	Jun 11, 2020	Oct 8, 2020
"Travel" (여행)	Bolbbalgan4	2× Platinum	Platinum	May 24, 2018	Feb 9, 2023	Apr 11, 2019
"Ddu-Du Ddu-Du" (뚜두뚜두)	Blackpink	2× Platinum	Platinum	Jun 15, 2018	Nov 10, 2022	Apr 11, 2019
"Roller Coaster"	Chungha	Platinum	Platinum	Jan 17, 2018	Dec 6, 2018	Jul 11, 2019
"Way Back Home"	Shaun	2× Platinum	Platinum	Jun 27, 2018	Mar 12, 2020	Apr 11, 2019
"Don't Give It To Me" (주지마)	Loco, Hwasa	Platinum	Platinum	Apr 21, 2018	Jan 11, 2019	Aug 8, 2019
"Love, ing" (열애중)	Ben	Platinum	Platinum	May 8, 2018	Mar 7, 2019	Sep 12, 2019
"Fake Love"	BTS	Platinum	Platinum	May 18, 2018	Mar 7, 2019	Dec 12, 2019
"Dance The Night Away"	Twice	Platinum	Platinum	Jul 9, 2018	Mar 7, 2019	Sep 12, 2019
"There has never been a day I haven't loved you" (하루도 그대를 사랑하지 않은 적이 없었다)	Im Chang-jung	Platinum	Platinum	Sep 19, 2018	May 9, 2019	Sep 10, 2020
"Bbibbi" (삐삐)	IU	Platinum	Platinum	Oct 10, 2018	May 9, 2019	Sep 12, 2019
"Me After You" (너를 만나)	Paul Kim	3× Platinum	Platinum	Oct 29, 2018	Sep 7, 2023	Oct 10, 2019
"Fall in Fall" (가을 타나 봐)	Vibe	Platinum	Platinum	Sep 18, 2018	Jun 6, 2019	Oct 8, 2020
"Solo"	Jennie	Platinum	Platinum	Nov 12, 2018	Jun 6, 2019	Mar 12, 2020
"After You've Gone" (넘쳐흘러)	MC the Max	Platinum	Platinum	Jan 2, 2019	Jul 11, 2019	Apr 7, 2022
"Idol"	BTS	Platinum	Platinum	Aug 24, 2018	Aug 8, 2019	Oct 8, 2020
"Yes or Yes"	Twice	Platinum	Platinum	Nov 5, 2018	Aug 8, 2019	Feb 11, 2021
"180 Degree" (180도)	Ben	Platinum	Platinum	Dec 7, 2018	Aug 8, 2019	Jan 8, 2021
"2002"	Anne-Marie	3× Platinum	Platinum	Apr 27, 2018	Feb 10, 2022	Mar 12, 2020
"Shin Yong Jae" (신용재)	Haeun	Platinum	Not awarded	Nov 6, 2018	Sep 12, 2019	Not awarded
"The Day Was Beautiful" (그때가 좋았어)	Kassy	2× Platinum	Platinum	Dec 31, 2018	Mar 7, 2024	Jun 10, 2021
"Gotta Go" (벌써 12시)	Chungha	Platinum	Platinum	Jan 2, 2019	Sep 12, 2019	Apr 8, 2021
"What Is Love?"	Twice	Platinum	Platinum	Apr 9, 2018	Oct 10, 2019	Aug 6, 2020
"If There Was Practice in Love" (사랑에 연습이 있었다면 (Prod. 2soo))	Lim Jae-hyun	2× Platinum	Not awarded	Sep 25, 2018	Jul 7, 2022	Not awarded
"Sorry" (고백)	Yang Da-il	Platinum	Platinum	Oct 15, 2018	Oct 10, 2019	Dec 10, 2020
"Boy With Luv (Feat. Halsey)" (작은 것들을 위한 시)	BTS	3× Platinum	Platinum	Apr 12, 2019	Sep 8, 2022	Apr 8, 2021
"Beautiful Moment" (내 생에 아름다운)	K.Will	Platinum	Platinum	Oct 23, 2018	Nov 7, 2019	Nov 11, 2021
"Rooftop" (옥탑방)	N.Flying	Platinum	Platinum	Jan 2, 2019	Nov 7, 2019	Jan 6, 2022
"Dalla Dalla" (달라달라)	Itzy	Platinum	Not awarded	Feb 12, 2019	Nov 7, 2019	Not awarded
"For Lovers Who Hesitate" (주저하는 연인들을 위해)	Jannabi	3× Platinum	Platinum	Mar 13, 2019	May 8, 2025	Dec 10, 2020
"Four Seasons" (사계)	Taeyeon	2× Platinum	Platinum	Mar 24, 2019	Jan 11, 2024	Apr 8, 2021
"Forever Young"	Blackpink	Platinum	Platinum	Jun 15, 2018	Mar 12, 2020	Dec 12, 2019
"Your Regards" (니 소식)	Song Ha-ye	Platinum	Not awarded	May 11, 2019	Dec 12, 2019	Not awarded
"Karaoke" (노래방에서)	Jang Beom-jun	Platinum	Not awarded	Mar 21, 2019	Jan 9, 2020	Not awarded
"Bad Guy"	Billie Eilish	2× Platinum	Platinum	Mar 29, 2019	Jul 6, 2023	Sep 9, 2021
"To You My Light (Feat. Lee Ra-on)" (오늘도 빛나는 너에게)	Maktub	3× Platinum	Platinum	Jun 9, 2019	Jul 10, 2025	Aug 11, 2022
"Drunk on Love" (술이 문제야)	Jang Hye-jin, Yoon Min-soo	Platinum	Not awarded	Jun 18, 2019	Jan 9, 2020	Not awarded
"So Long" (안녕)	Paul Kim	2× Platinum	Not awarded	Aug 12, 2019	Jul 7, 2022	Not awarded
"Flower Road" (꽃 길)	Bigbang	Platinum	Platinum	Mar 13, 2018	Feb 9, 2023	Feb 6, 2020
"Snack Cart" (포장마차)	Hwang In-wook	Platinum	Not awarded	Jun 20, 2019	Mar 12, 2020	Not awarded
"Your Shampoo Scent in the Flowers" (흔들리는 꽃들 속에서 네 샴푸향이 느껴진거야)	Jang Beom-jun	3× Platinum	Platinum	Aug 23, 2019	Mar 9, 2023	Mar 10, 2022
"How Can I Love the Heartbreak, You're the One I Love" (어떻게 이별까지 사랑하겠어, 널 사랑하는 거지)	AKMU	3× Platinum	Platinum	Sep 25, 2019	Dec 8, 2022	Dec 9, 2021
"Unspoken Words" (너에게 못했던 내 마지막 말은)	Davichi	Platinum	Not awarded	May 17, 2019	Apr 9, 2020	Not awarded
"Bad Boy"	Red Velvet	Not awarded	Platinum	Jan 29, 2018	Not awarded	Apr 9, 2020
"The Lonely Bloom Stands Alone" (시든 꽃에 물을 주듯)	Hynn	2× Platinum	Not awarded	Mar 31, 2019	Sep 10, 2026	Not awarded
"My Love Has Faded Away" (사랑이 식었다고 말해도 돼)	Monday Kiz	Platinum	Not awarded	May 27, 2019	May 7, 2020	Not awarded
"Paris In The Rain"	Lauv	2× Platinum	Platinum	Oct 8, 2018	Aug 10, 2023	Jun 10, 2021
"One Day Only" (사계 (하루살이))	MC the Max	Platinum	Not awarded	Jan 2, 2019	Jun 11, 2020	Not awarded
"Bom" (나만, 봄)	Bolbbalgan4	Platinum	Not awarded	Apr 2, 2019	Jun 11, 2020	Not awarded
"Remember Me" (기억해줘요 내 모든 날과 그때를)	Gummy	Platinum	Not awarded	Aug 4, 2019	Jun 11, 2020	Not awarded
"Late Night" (늦은 밤 너의 집 앞 골목길에서)	Noel	2× Platinum	Not awarded	Nov 7, 2019	Oct 7, 2021	Not awarded
"Blueming"	IU	3× Platinum	Platinum	Nov 18, 2019	Apr 11, 2024	Aug 11, 2022
"Meteor"	Changmo	2× Platinum	Not awarded	Nov 29, 2019	Sep 9, 2021	Not awarded
"The Way to Say Goodbye" (이별하러 가는 길)	Lim Han-byul	Platinum	Not awarded	Sep 13, 2018	Jul 9, 2020	Not awarded
"Fire Up" (이 노래가 클럽에서 나온다면)	Woody	Platinum	Not awarded	Jan 23, 2019	Jul 9, 2020	Not awarded
"All About You" (그대라는 시)	Taeyeon	Platinum	Not awarded	Jul 21, 2019	Jul 9, 2020	Not awarded
"Love Poem"	IU	2× Platinum	Not awarded	Nov 1, 2019	Mar 9, 2023	Not awarded
"Any Song" (아무노래)	Zico	2× Platinum	Not awarded	Jan 13, 2020	Feb 12, 2026	Not awarded
"I'm a Little Drunk" (조금 취했어 (Prod. 2soo))	Lim Jae-hyun	Platinum	Not awarded	Sep 24, 2019	Aug 6, 2020	Not awarded
"I Still Love You a Lot" (사랑이란 멜로는 없어)	Jeon Sang-keun	Platinum	Not awarded	Sep 8, 2019	Sep 10, 2020	Not awarded
"Only One for Me" (너 없인 안 된다)	BtoB	Platinum	Platinum	Jun 18, 2018	Aug 10, 2023	Sep 10, 2020
"Good Day (Feat. Paloalto)" (Prod. Code Kunst)	pH-1, Kid Milli, Loopy	Platinum	Platinum	Oct 6, 2018	Oct 8, 2020	Jul 7, 2022
"Aloha" (아로하)	Jo Jung-suk	2× Platinum	Not awarded	Mar 27, 2020	Jan 12, 2023	Not awarded
"Hip"	Mamamoo	Platinum	Not awarded	Nov 14, 2019	Nov 12, 2020	Not awarded
"Psycho"	Red Velvet	Platinum	Not awarded	Dec 23, 2019	Nov 12, 2020	Not awarded
"Eight (Prod. & Feat. Suga)" (에잇)	IU	2× Platinum	Not awarded	May 6, 2020	Apr 7, 2022	Not awarded
"The Snowman" (눈사람)	Jung Seung-hwan	Platinum	Platinum	Feb 19, 2018	Jan 12, 2023	Nov 12, 2020
"Start Over" (시작)	Gaho	Platinum	Not awarded	Feb 1, 2020	Jan 7, 2021	Not awarded
"Speechless"	Naomi Scott	Platinum	Not awarded	May 17, 2019	Feb 11, 2021	Not awarded
"Dynamite"	BTS	3× Platinum	Not awarded	Aug 21, 2020	Oct 12, 2023	Not awarded
"To be honest" (솔직하게 말해서 나)	Kim Na-young	Platinum	Not awarded	Jun 9, 2019	Mar 11, 2021	Not awarded
"Señorita"	Shawn Mendes, Camila Cabello	Platinum	Not awarded	Jun 21, 2019	Mar 11, 2021	Not awarded
"Nonstop" (살짝 설렜어)	Oh My Girl	Platinum	Not awarded	Apr 27, 2020	Mar 11, 2021	Not awarded
"Memories"	Maroon 5	Platinum	Not awarded	Sep 20, 2019	Apr 8, 2021	Not awarded
"Give You My Heart" (마음을 드려요)	IU	Platinum	Not awarded	Feb 15, 2020	Apr 8, 2021	Not awarded
"Dolphin"	Oh My Girl	Platinum	Not awarded	Apr 27, 2020	Apr 8, 2021	Not awarded
"How You Like That"	Blackpink	Platinum	Not awarded	Jun 26, 2020	Apr 8, 2021	Not awarded
"Slightly Tipsy" (취기를 빌려)	Sandeul	2× Platinum	Not awarded	Jul 20, 2020	Jun 6, 2024	Not awarded
"Fancy"	Twice	Platinum	Not awarded	Apr 22, 2019	May 6, 2021	Not awarded
"I Need You" (어떻게 지내)	Ovan	Platinum	Not awarded	Mar 5, 2020	May 6, 2021	Not awarded
"Bloom" (처음처럼)	MC the Max	Platinum	Not awarded	Mar 25, 2020	May 6, 2021	Not awarded
"María" (마리아)	Hwasa	Platinum	Not awarded	Jun 29, 2020	May 6, 2021	Not awarded
"Dance Monkey"	Tones and I	Platinum	Not awarded	May 10, 2019	Jul 8, 2021	Not awarded
"Don't Start Now"	Dua Lipa	Platinum	Not awarded	Oct 31, 2019	Aug 11, 2021	Not awarded
"Lovesick Girls"	Blackpink	Platinum	Not awarded	Oct 2, 2020	Aug 11, 2021	Not awarded
"Celebrity"	IU	2× Platinum	Not awarded	Jan 27, 2021	Nov 9, 2023	Not awarded
"On"	BTS	Platinum	Not awarded	Feb 21, 2020	Oct 7, 2021	Not awarded
"Can't Sleep" (잠이 오질 않네요)	Jang Beom-jun	Platinum	Not awarded	Oct 24, 2020	Oct 7, 2021	Not awarded
"Fiancé" (아낙네)	Mino	Not awarded	Platinum	Nov 26, 2018	Not awarded	Oct 7, 2021
"Thank U, Next"	Ariana Grande	Platinum	Platinum	Nov 3, 2018	Nov 11, 2021	Apr 7, 2022
"Why Break Up?" (우리 왜 헤어져야 해)	Sin Ye-young	Platinum	Not awarded	Nov 20, 2019	Nov 11, 2021	Not awarded
"Shiny Star" (밤 하늘의 별을(2020))	KyoungSeo	2× Platinum	Not awarded	Nov 14, 2020	May 9, 2024	Not awarded
"Trust in Me" (이제 나만 믿어요)	Lim Young-woong	2× Platinum	Not awarded	Apr 3, 2020	Jun 6, 2024	Not awarded
"Peaches (Feat. Daniel Caesar, Giveon)"	Justin Bieber	Platinum	Not awarded	Mar 19, 2021	Dec 9, 2021	Not awarded
"Lilac" (라일락)	IU	Platinum	Not awarded	Mar 25, 2021	Dec 9, 2021	Not awarded
"Savage Love (Laxed – Siren Beat) (BTS Remix)"	Jawsh 685, Jason Derulo, BTS	Platinum	Not awarded	Oct 2, 2020	Jan 6, 2022	Not awarded
"Next Level"	Aespa	2× Platinum	Not awarded	May 17, 2021	Jul 11, 2024	Not awarded
"Traffic Light" (신호등)	Lee Mu-jin	2× Platinum	Not awarded	May 14, 2021	Dec 12, 2024	Not awarded
"Power Up"	Red Velvet	Not awarded	Platinum	Aug 6, 2018	Not awarded	Feb 10, 2022
"VVS (Feat. Justhis)" (Prod. GroovyRoom)	Mirani, Munchman, Khundi Panda, Mushvenom	Platinum	Not awarded	Nov 21, 2020	Mar 10, 2022	Not awarded
"Butter"	BTS	Platinum	Not awarded	May 21, 2021	Mar 10, 2022	Not awarded
"Beach Again" (다시 여기 바닷가)	SSAK3	Platinum	Not awarded	Jul 18, 2020	May 12, 2022	Not awarded
"Foolish Love" (바라만 본다)	MSG Wannabe (M.O.M)	Platinum	Not awarded	Jun 26, 2021	May 12, 2022	Not awarded
"Stay"	The Kid LAROI, Justin Bieber	2× Platinum	Not awarded	Jul 9, 2021	Apr 11, 2024	Not awarded
"Happen" (헤픈 우연)	Heize	Platinum	Not awarded	May 20, 2021	Jun 9, 2022	Not awarded
"Dun Dun Dance"	Oh My Girl	Platinum	Not awarded	May 10, 2021	Jul 7, 2022	Not awarded
"If You Lovingly Call My Name" (다정히 내 이름을 부르면)	GyeongseoYeji, Jeon Gun-ho	2× Platinum	Not awarded	May 19, 2021	Jul 11, 2024	Not awarded
"Weekend"	Taeyeon	Platinum	Not awarded	Jul 6, 2021	Aug 11, 2022	Not awarded
"Square (2017)"	Baek Ye-rin	Platinum	Not awarded	Dec 10, 2019	Sep 8, 2022	Not awarded
"I Knew I Love" (사랑하게 될 줄 알았어)	Jeon Mi-do	Platinum	Not awarded	May 22, 2020	Sep 8, 2022	Not awarded
"It Takes Time (Feat. Colde)" (시간이 들겠지)	Loco	Not awarded	Platinum	Oct 8, 2018	Not awarded	Sep 8, 2022
"Permission to Dance"	BTS	Platinum	Not awarded	Jul 9, 2021	Oct 6, 2022	Not awarded
"Love Always Runs Away" (사랑은 늘 도망가)	Lim Young-woong	2× Platinum	Not awarded	Oct 11, 2021	Jun 6, 2024	Not awarded
"Ohayo My Night"	D-Hack, PATEKO	Platinum	Not awarded	Jun 20, 2020	Nov 10, 2022	Not awarded
"Merry-Go-Round (Feat. Zion.T, Wonstein)" (회전목마 (Prod. Slom))	Sokodomo	Platinum	Not awarded	Nov 13, 2021	Nov 10, 2022	Not awarded
"Drunken Confession" (취중고백)	Kim Min-seok	2× Platinum	Not awarded	Dec 19, 2021	Feb 6, 2025	Not awarded
"Tomboy"	I-dle	Platinum	Not awarded	Mar 14, 2022	Nov 10, 2022	Not awarded
"Love Dive"	Ive	2× Platinum	Not awarded	Apr 5, 2022	Mar 7, 2024	Not awarded
"Eleven"	Ive	Platinum	Not awarded	Dec 1, 2021	Dec 8, 2022	Not awarded
"Comethru"	Jeremy Zucker	Platinum	Not awarded	Sep 28, 2018	Jan 12, 2023	Not awarded
"12:45 (Stripped)"	Etham	Platinum	Not awarded	Oct 26, 2018	Jan 12, 2023	Not awarded
"Love Should Not Be Harsh on You" (힘든 건 사랑이 아니다)	Im Chang-jung	Platinum	Not awarded	Oct 19, 2020	Jan 12, 2023	Not awarded
"Strawberry Moon"	IU	Platinum	Not awarded	Oct 19, 2021	Jan 12, 2023	Not awarded
"Love, Maybe" (사랑인가 봐)	MeloMance	2× Platinum	Not awarded	Feb 18, 2022	Feb 6, 2025	Not awarded
"I Will be Your Shining Star" (밝게 빛나는 별이 되어 비춰줄게)	Song I-han	Platinum	Not awarded	Dec 29, 2020	Feb 9, 2023	Not awarded
"Hype Boy"	NewJeans	3× Platinum	Not awarded	Aug 1, 2022	Aug 6, 2026	Not awarded
"Kill This Love"	Blackpink	Platinum	Not awarded	Apr 5, 2019	May 11, 2023	Not awarded
"Maniac"	Conan Gray	Platinum	Not awarded	Oct 24, 2019	May 11, 2023	Not awarded
"The Moment My Heart" (내 마음이 움찔했던 순간)	Kyuhyun	Platinum	Not awarded	Aug 23, 2020	May 11, 2023	Not awarded
"Event Horizon" (사건의 지평선)	Younha	2× Platinum	Not awarded	Mar 30, 2022	May 8, 2025	Not awarded
"Attention"	NewJeans	2× Platinum	Not awarded	Aug 1, 2022	Aug 7, 2025	Not awarded
"After Like"	Ive	Platinum	Not awarded	Aug 22, 2022	May 11, 2023	Not awarded
"Siren Remix (Feat. Uneducated Kid, Paul Blanco)" (사이렌 Remix)	Homies	Platinum	Not awarded	Mar 20, 2021	Jun 8, 2023	Not awarded
"Still Life" (봄여름가을겨울)	Bigbang	Platinum	Not awarded	Apr 5, 2022	Jun 8, 2023	Not awarded
"Beyond Love (Feat. 10cm)" (정이라고 하자)	BIG Naughty	Platinum	Not awarded	Apr 20, 2022	Jun 8, 2023	Not awarded
"When We Disco"	JYP, Sunmi	Platinum	Not awarded	Aug 12, 2020	Jul 6, 2023	Not awarded
"Off My Face"	Justin Bieber	Platinum	Not awarded	Mar 19, 2021	Jul 6, 2023	Not awarded
"Ditto"	NewJeans	2× Platinum	Not awarded	Dec 19, 2022	Jun 12, 2025	Not awarded
"Dear My X" (나의 X에게)	KyoungSeo	Platinum	Not awarded	Apr 24, 2022	Sep 7, 2023	Not awarded
"That That (Prod. & Feat. Suga)"	Psy	Platinum	Not awarded	Apr 29, 2022	Sep 7, 2023	Not awarded
"Someday, The Boy" (그때 그 아인)	Kim Feel	Platinum	Not awarded	Feb 15, 2020	Oct 12, 2023	Not awarded
"Do You Want to Walk With Me?" (나랑 같이 걸을래)	Jukjae	Platinum	Not awarded	Oct 23, 2020	Oct 12, 2023	Not awarded
"Limousine (Feat. Mino)" (리무진 (Prod. Gray))	Be'O	Platinum	Not awarded	Nov 20, 2021	Oct 12, 2023	Not awarded
"At That Moment" (그때 그 순간 그대로 (그그그))	WSG Wannabe (Gaya-G)	Platinum	Not awarded	Jul 9, 2022	Oct 12, 2023	Not awarded
"Bad Habits"	Ed Sheeran	Platinum	Not awarded	Jun 25, 2021	Nov 9, 2023	Not awarded
"Nakka (With IU)" (낙하)	AKMU	Platinum	Not awarded	Jul 26, 2021	Nov 9, 2023	Not awarded
"Dial Your Number" (너의 번호를 누르고 (Prod. 영화처럼))	An Nyeong	Platinum	Not awarded	Nov 30, 2019	Dec 7, 2023	Not awarded
"Fearless"	Le Sserafim	Platinum	Not awarded	May 2, 2022	Dec 7, 2023	Not awarded
"I Am"	Ive	2× Platinum	Not awarded	Apr 10, 2023	Feb 12, 2026	Not awarded
"Antifragile"	Le Sserafim	Platinum	Not awarded	Oct 17, 2022	Jan 11, 2024	Not awarded
"OMG"	NewJeans	Platinum	Not awarded	Jan 2, 2023	Jan 11, 2024	Not awarded
"That's Hilarious"	Charlie Puth	Platinum	Not awarded	Apr 22, 2022	Feb 8, 2024	Not awarded
"Again" (다시 만날까 봐)	V.O.S	Platinum	Not awarded	Sep 1, 2019	Mar 7, 2024	Not awarded
"Story of Night Fall" (가을밤 떠난 너)	Kassy	Platinum	Not awarded	Sep 5, 2019	Mar 7, 2024	Not awarded
"New Thing (Feat. Homies)" (새삥 (Prod. Zico))	Zico	Platinum	Not awarded	Sep 6, 2022	Apr 11, 2024	Not awarded
"Feel My Rhythm"	Red Velvet	Platinum	Not awarded	Mar 21, 2022	May 9, 2024	Not awarded
"Kitsch"	Ive	Platinum	Not awarded	Mar 27, 2023	May 9, 2024	Not awarded
"Let's Say Goodbye" (헤어지자 말해요)	Parc Jae-jung	Platinum	Not awarded	Apr 20, 2023	May 9, 2024	Not awarded
"Our Blues, Our Life" (우리들의 블루스)	Lim Young-woong	Platinum	Not awarded	Apr 17, 2022	Jun 6, 2024	Not awarded
"Savage"	Aespa	Platinum	Not awarded	Oct 5, 2021	Jul 11, 2024	Not awarded
"INVU"	Taeyeon	Platinum	Not awarded	Feb 14, 2022	Jul 11, 2024	Not awarded
"Without Me" (내가 아니라도)	Juho	Platinum	Not awarded	Mar 25, 2022	Jul 11, 2024	Not awarded
"Haeyo" (해요 (2022))	An Nyeong	Platinum	Not awarded	Jun 7, 2022	Jul 11, 2024	Not awarded
"Gradation" (그라데이션)	10cm	Platinum	Not awarded	Jul 3, 2022	Jul 11, 2024	Not awarded
"Queencard" (퀸카)	I-dle	Platinum	Not awarded	May 15, 2023	Jul 11, 2024	Not awarded
"Super Shy"	NewJeans	Platinum	Not awarded	Jul 7, 2023	Aug 8, 2024	Not awarded
"Time of Our Life" (한 페이지가 될 수 있게)	Day6	2× Platinum	Not awarded	Jul 15, 2019	Jun 11, 2026	Not awarded
"Think About You" (너를 생각해)	Joosiq	Platinum	Not awarded	Sep 22, 2021	Oct 10, 2024	Not awarded
"Spicy"	Aespa	Platinum	Not awarded	May 8, 2023	Oct 10, 2024	Not awarded
"ETA"	NewJeans	Platinum	Not awarded	Jul 21, 2023	Nov 7, 2024	Not awarded
"When It Snows (Feat. Heize)" (눈이 오잖아)	Lee Mu-jin	Platinum	Not awarded	Dec 3, 2021	Dec 12, 2024	Not awarded
"I Still Love You" (추억은 만남보다 이별에 남아)	Jung Dong-ha	Platinum	Not awarded	Jan 31, 2021	Jan 9, 2025	Not awarded
"LOVE me"	Be'O	Platinum	Not awarded	Apr 12, 2022	Jan 9, 2025	Not awarded
"Seven (Feat. Latto)"	Jungkook	Platinum	Not awarded	Jul 14, 2023	Jan 9, 2025	Not awarded
"On That Day" (그날에 나는 맘이 편했을까)	Lee Ye-joon	Platinum	Not awarded	Dec 3, 2020	Feb 6, 2025	Not awarded
"Pink Venom"	Blackpink	Platinum	Not awarded	Aug 19, 2022	Mar 6, 2025	Not awarded
"Supernova"	Aespa	Platinum	Not awarded	May 13, 2024	Mar 6, 2025	Not awarded
"Life Goes On"	BTS	Platinum	Not awarded	Nov 20, 2020	Apr 10, 2025	Not awarded
"If We Ever Meet Again" (다시 만날 수 있을까)	Lim Young-woong	Platinum	Not awarded	May 2, 2022	May 8, 2025	Not awarded
"Bad"	Christopher	Platinum	Not awarded	Apr 13, 2018	May 8, 2025	Not awarded
"Plot Twist" (첫 만남은 계획대로 되지 않아)	TWS	Platinum	Not awarded	Jan 22, 2024	May 8, 2025	Not awarded
"Drama" (드라마)	IU	Platinum	Not awarded	Dec 29, 2021	Jun 12, 2025	Not awarded
"I Don't Think That I Like Her"	Charlie Puth	Platinum	Not awarded	Sep 16, 2022	Jun 12, 2025	Not awarded
"Fate" (나는 아픈 건 딱 질색이니까)	I-dle	Platinum	Not awarded	Jan 29, 2024	Jun 12, 2025	Not awarded
"Magnetic"	Illit	Platinum	Not awarded	Mar 25, 2024	Jun 12, 2025	Not awarded
"Grown Ups" (어른)	Sondia	Platinum	Not awarded	Mar 29, 2018	Jul 10, 2025	Not awarded
"Introduce Me a Good Person" (좋은 사람 있으면 소개시켜줘)	Joy	Platinum	Not awarded	Mar 20, 2020	Jul 10, 2025	Not awarded
"ASAP"	STAYC	Platinum	Not awarded	Apr 8, 2021	Jul 10, 2025	Not awarded
"If I Have You Only" (그대만 있다면)	Nerd Connection	Platinum	Not awarded	Aug 15, 2023	Jul 10, 2025	Not awarded
"Love Wins All"	IU	Platinum	Not awarded	Jan 24, 2024	Jul 10, 2025	Not awarded
"Maybe It's Not Our Fault" (그건 아마 우리의 잘못은 아닐 거야)	Baek Ye-rin	Platinum	Not awarded	Mar 18, 2019	Aug 7, 2025	Not awarded
"Fighting (Feat. Lee Young-ji)" (파이팅 해야지)	BSS	Platinum	Not awarded	Feb 6, 2023	Aug 7, 2025	Not awarded
"Rhapsody of Sadness" (비의 랩소디)	Lim Jae-hyun	Platinum	Not awarded	Dec 3, 2023	Aug 7, 2025	Not awarded
"Apt."	Rosé, Bruno Mars	Platinum	Not awarded	Oct 18, 2024	Aug 7, 2025	Not awarded
"Heavenly Fate" (천상연)	Lee Chang-sub	Platinum	Not awarded	Feb 21, 2024	Sep 11, 2025	Not awarded
"Welcome to the Show"	Day6	Platinum	Not awarded	Mar 18, 2024	Sep 11, 2025	Not awarded
"Sudden Shower" (소나기)	Eclipse	Platinum	Not awarded	Apr 8, 2024	Sep 11, 2025	Not awarded
"How Sweet"	NewJeans	Platinum	Not awarded	May 24, 2024	Sep 11, 2025	Not awarded
"Whiplash"	Aespa	Platinum	Not awarded	Oct 21, 2024	Sep 11, 2025	Not awarded
"Painkiller"	Ruel	Platinum	Not awarded	May 1, 2019	Oct 9, 2025	Not awarded
"Drowning"	Woodz	Platinum	Not awarded	Apr 26, 2023	Oct 9, 2025	Not awarded
"Episode" (에피소드)	Lee Mu-jin	Platinum	Not awarded	Dec 13, 2023	Oct 9, 2025	Not awarded
"Happy"	Day6	Platinum	Not awarded	Mar 18, 2024	Oct 9, 2025	Not awarded
"T.B.H" (고민중독)	QWER	Platinum	Not awarded	Apr 1, 2024	Oct 9, 2025	Not awarded
"A Letter" (인사)	Bumjin	Platinum	Not awarded	Dec 24, 2021	Nov 6, 2025	Not awarded
"Go Back" (고백)	MeloMance	Platinum	Not awarded	Aug 29, 2021	Dec 11, 2025	Not awarded
"Flower in the Desert" (사막에서 꽃을 피우듯)	Woody	Platinum	Not awarded	Jul 14, 2023	Dec 11, 2025	Not awarded
"To. X"	Taeyeon	Platinum	Not awarded	Nov 27, 2023	Dec 11, 2025	Not awarded
"All I Want for Christmas Is You"	Mariah Carey	Platinum	Not awarded	Nov 1, 2019	Feb 12, 2026	Not awarded
"Home Sweet Home (Feat. Taeyang, Daesung)"	G-Dragon	Platinum	Not awarded	Nov 22, 2024	Feb 12, 2026	Not awarded
"Love Lee"	AKMU	Platinum	Not awarded	Aug 21, 2023	Apr 9, 2026	Not awarded
"I'm Firefly" (나는 반딧불)	Hwang Ga-ram	Platinum	Not awarded	Oct 21, 2024	Apr 9, 2026	Not awarded
"H.E.Art" (심(心))	DK	Platinum	Not awarded	Feb 19, 2023	May 7, 2026	Not awarded
"Golden"	Huntrix	Platinum	Not awarded	Jun 20, 2025	May 7, 2026	Not awarded
"Goodbye"	Park Hyo-shin	Platinum	Not awarded	May 6, 2019	Jun 11, 2026	Not awarded
"Shut Down"	Blackpink	Platinum	Not awarded	Sep 16, 2022	Jun 11, 2026	Not awarded
"Monologue"	Tei	Platinum	Not awarded	Sep 18, 2022	Jun 11, 2026	Not awarded
"Eve, Psyche & the Bluebeard's Wife" (이브, 프시케 그리고 푸른 수염의 아내)	Le Sserafim	Platinum	Not awarded	May 1, 2023	Jun 11, 2026	Not awarded
"Cookie"	NewJeans	Platinum	Not awarded	Aug 1, 2022	Aug 6, 2026	Not awarded
"Drama"	Aespa	Platinum	Not awarded	Nov 10, 2023	Aug 6, 2026	Not awarded
"Toxic Till the End"	Rosé	Platinum	Not awarded	Dec 6, 2024	Aug 6, 2026	Not awarded
"Don't You Know" (모르시나요 (Prod. Rocoberry))	Zo Zazz	Platinum	Not awarded	Jan 7, 2025	Aug 6, 2026	Not awarded
"Boong Boong (Feat. Sik-K)" (붕붕 (Prod. GroovyRoom))	Haon	Platinum	Not awarded	Apr 14, 2018	Sep 10, 2026	Not awarded
"Perfect Night"	Le Sserafim	Platinum	Not awarded	Oct 27, 2023	Sep 10, 2026	Not awarded
"To Reach You" (너에게 닿기를)	10cm	Platinum	Not awarded	Mar 6, 2025	Oct 8, 2026	Not awarded

== See also ==
- List of best-selling singles in South Korea
- List of music recording certifications
- List of certified albums in South Korea
