= The People's Champion =

The People's Champion or The People's Champ may refer to:

== People ==
- Muhammad Ali, a professional American boxer, nicknamed "The People's Champion"
- Will Barton, a professional basketball player for the Denver Nuggets, nicknamed "The People's Champ"
- Ali Daei, Iranian footballer extraordinaire known to a select few as "The People's Champion"
- Tony Ferguson, an American mixed martial artist, also nicknamed The People's Champion
- Gennady Golovkin, a professional Kazakh boxer, nicknamed "The People's Champ"
- Ricky Hatton, a British professional boxer, nicknamed "The People's Champion"
- Alex Higgins, an Irish former snooker player, nicknamed "The People's Champion"
- David "GrandPooBear" Hunt, a prominent video game streamer and Red Bull athlete, nicknamed "The People's Champ"
- Dwayne Johnson, an American actor and wrestler, nicknamed "The People's Champion"
- Usman Khawaja, Australian cricketer often referred to as "The People's Champion"
- Freddie Mitchell, a former Philadelphia Eagles wide receiver, nicknamed "The People's Champ
- Tito Ortiz, an American mixed martial artist, nicknamed "The People's Champ"
- Manny Pacquiao, a Filipino politician and former professional boxer. Regarded as one of the greatest professional boxers of all time, he is also nicknamed "The People's Champ"
- Diamond Dallas Page, an American wrestler, nicknamed "The People's Champion"
- Michael Spinks, a professional American boxer, regarded as "The People's Champion" while going for the Tyson fight
- Sean Strickland, a professional mixed martial artist for the UFC, nicknamed "The People's Champion" prior to winning the UFC middleweight title
- Derrick Rose, a retired professional basketball player for the Chicago Bulls, nicknamed "The People's Champ"
- Paul Wall, Texas Rap Legend, also nicknamed “The People’s Champ”

== Characters ==
- Kenny Powers (character), a fictional character from the HBO series Eastbound and Down, nicknamed "The People's Champion"
- Atom from the movie Real Steel, since, at the end of the movie, he receives the nickname of "People's Champion" after nearly defeating the champion Zeus in boxing

== Music ==
- The Peoples Champ, an album by the American rapper Paul Wall
- The People's Champ, an album by American singer Quinn XCII
- People's Champion, an album by Finnish singer Käärijä
- "The People's Champ", a song by R.A. the Rugged Man from his 2013 album Legends Never Die
- "People's Champ", a song by Arkells from their 2018 album Rally Cry

== Other uses ==
- People's Champ Movement, Philippine political party led by Manny Pacquiao
