= Here for Now =

Studio album by Louis the Child
- Released: June 26, 2020
- Genre: EDM, pop, future bass
- Length: 43:19
- Label: Interscope
- Producer: Louis the Child; Jon Bellion; Billboard; Jason Evigan

Louis the Child chronology
Kids at Play (2018)	Here for Now (2020)	Euphoria (2021)

Singles from Here for Now
- 1. "Free" Released: November 6, 2019; 2. "Don't Mind" Released: January 31, 2020; 3. "Every Color" Released: March 4, 2020; 4. "Little Things" Released: April 3, 2020; 5. "Nobody Like You" Released: May 18, 2020

Here for Now is the debut studio album by American electronic music DJ duo Louis the Child. It was released on June 26, 2020, through Interscope Records.

== Track listing ==
Here for Now track listing
No.	Title	Writer(s)	Producer(s)	Length
1.	"Scooter's Debut (Intro)"	Robert Hauldren; Frederic Kennett	Louis the Child	0:33
2.	"Big Love" (with EarthGang)	Hauldren; Kennett; Amanda Lucille Warner; Peter Wade Keusch; Evan Bogart; Johnny Venus; Eian Parker	Louis the Child	2:47
3.	"Bittersweet"	Hauldren; Kennett; Alexander Glantz	Louis the Child	3:20
4.	"Little Things" (with Quinn XCII and Chelsea Cutler)	Hauldren; Kennett; Chelsea Cutler; Jonathan Bellion; Mathieu Jomphe-Lepine; Mikael Temrowski	Louis the Child; Jon Bellion; Billboard^{[a]}; Tristan Hoogland^{[v]}; Dylan McDougle^{[v]}	3:17
5.	"We All Have Dreams" (with K.Flay)	Hauldren; Kennett; Kristine Flaherty	Louis the Child	3:53
6.	"Nobody Like You" (with Vera Blue)	Hauldren; Kennett; Celia Pavey; Giana Shabestani; Martin Doherty	Louis the Child; Eric J. Dubowsky^{[v]}	2:55
7.	"Don't Mind"	Hauldren; Kennett; Ari Leff; Michael Pollack	Louis the Child; Jason Evigan^{[c]}^{[v]}; Gian Stone^{[v]}	2:54
8.	"Every Color" (with Foster the People)	Hauldren; Kennett; Mark Foster	Louis the Child	3:54
9.	"Get Together" (with Duckwrth)	Hauldren; Kennett; Jared Lee	Louis the Child	2:24
10.	"What a World" (with Bob Moses)	Hauldren; Kennett; Jimmy Vallance; Thomas Howie	Louis the Child; Bob Moses	3:59
11.	"La La La (Everything's Okay)"	Hauldren; Kennett	Louis the Child	3:03
12.	"Free" (with Drew Love)	Hauldren; Kennett; Isaac Valens; Rogét Chahayed; Drew Love	Louis the Child	3:42
13.	"We Are Here for Now"	Hauldren; Kennett	Louis the Child	3:15
14.	"Fade Away"	Hauldren; Kennett	Louis the Child	3:16
Total length:				43:19

Deluxe edition
No.	Title	Writer(s)	Producer(s)	Length
15.	"Here Comes a Feeling" (with Naomi Wild and Couros)	Hauldren; Kennett; India Quateman; Couros Sheibani; Blaise Railey	Louis the Child; Couros^{[c]}; Josh Deane^{[v]}	3:04
16.	"Self Care" (with Coin)	Chase Lawrence; Ryan Winnen; Joe Memmel	Louis the Child; Lawrence^{[c]}	3:09
17.	"Somewhere Else" (with BabyJake)	Hauldren; Kennett; Jake Herring; Dan Shyman	Louis the Child; BabyJake	3:23
18.	"Sleep // Wake"	Hauldren; Kennett	Louis the Child	4:42
Total length:				57:36

- ^{^[a]} indicates an additional producer
- ^{^[c]} indicates a co-producer
- ^{^[v]} indicates a vocal producer

== Personnel ==
Credits adapted from Tidal.

Louis the Child

- Robby Hauldren – arrangement (1–16, 18), post-production (1–11, 13–16, 18), sampler (1, 11, 14), vocals (1, 7, 11, 13, 14), drum programming (2, 4–7, 9–11, 13, 14, 16), synth bass (2, 12), synthesizer programming (2–9, 11, 13–15), additional vocals (3, 7), keyboards (3–5, 7, 9–11, 13, 14), programming (4, 5, 9, 11–14, 17), keyboards arrangement (5, 9, 11, 13, 14), bass programming (6), drums (7), synthesizer (7), background vocals (8, 10), engineer (11, 13), vocal arrangement (11, 13), rhythm programming (15), additional keyboards (16), sound design (16, 18)
- Freddy Kennett – computer music noises (1, 5, 9, 13, 14), sound design (1–11, 13–16, 18), post-production (1–11, 13–16, 18), programming (1–15, 17), bass programming (2–5, 9, 11, 13, 14, 16), drum programming (2–15), sampler (2), synth bass (2, 4, 6, 7, 10, 16), engineer (3, 13), keyboards (3–5, 7, 9, 11–14), synthesizer (3, 5, 7, 9, 11, 13, 14), vocal arrangement (3, 13), vocals (3, 7, 13, 14), synthesizer programming (4, 6–8, 10, 12, 15), keyboards arrangement (5, 9, 11, 13, 14), piano (5, 9, 11, 13, 14), drums (7, 16), percussion (7), background vocals (8, 10), additional keyboards (9), rhythm arrangement (12), strings (12), arrangement (16, 18)

Additional musicians

- Jarina de Marco – additional vocals (2)
- Josh Deane – samples (2), vocal arrangement (2, 10)
- EarthGang – vocals (2)
- MNDR – vocals (2)
- Alexander 23 – additional vocals, guitar (3)
- Eric J Dubowsky – additional keyboards (4, 6), bass programming (4), electric guitar (6), background vocals (7), bass guitar (7)
- Chelsea Cutler – vocals (4)
- Quinn XCII – vocals (4)
- Ariel Shrum – trumpet (5, 9)
- Baraka May – vocal arrangement (5)
- Laura Jackman – vocal arrangement (5)
- K.Flay – vocals (5)
- Vera Blue – vocals (6)
- Jason Evigan – guitar (7)
- Mark Foster – vocals (8)
- Duckwrth – vocals (9)
- Jimmy Vallance – drum programming, synthesizer (10)
- Tom Howie – guitar, vocals (10)
- Drew Love – vocals (12)
- Couros Sheibani – synthesizer programming, vocal programming (15)
- Naomi Wild – vocals (15)
- Joe Memmel – additional vocals (16)
- Ryan Winnen – additional vocals (16)
- Chase Lawrence – bass, drum programming, guitar, keyboards, piano, vocals, whistle (16)
- BabyJake – vocals (17)

Technical

- Dale Becker – mastering engineer
- Eric J Dubowsky – mixer (all tracks), engineer (1–11, 13, 14, 16, 17), vocal engineer (6), vocal mix (6)
- Josh Deane – engineer (2, 3, 10), post-production (1–11, 13, 14), production coordinator (1–11, 13–15), vocal editing (4), recording engineer (5, 9, 12, 15), recording arranger (7, 8, 15), editor (15)
- Eric Dan – engineer (2)
- Tristan Hooglan – engineer (4)
- Dylan McDougle – engineer (4)
- Jeff Ryon – engineer (5, 9, 12, 15)
- Chase Lawrence – engineer (16)
- Isaac Valens – recording engineer (12)
- Jason Evigan – vocal engineer (7)
- Gian Stone – vocal engineer (7)
- Dan Shyman – vocal engineer (17)
- Matthew Curtin – assistant mixer (8)

== Charts ==
Chart performance of Here for Now
Chart (2020)	Peak position
US Heatseekers Albums (Billboard)	8
US Top Dance Albums (Billboard)	6
