= Louis the Child (DJs) =

American DJ duo

- Louis The Child in 2018

Background information
- Origin: Winnetka, Illinois, U.S.
- Genres: Dance-pop; electronic; future bass
- Years active: 2013–present
- Label: Interscope
- Members: Frederic Kennett; Robby Hauldren
- Website: www.louisthechild.com

Louis the Child is an American electronic music group consisting of Robby Hauldren and Frederic J. Kennett.

== Career ==
Robert David Hauldren was born on September 7, 1996, to David and Julia Hauldren. He attended one academic year at the University of Southern California, where he joined the Beta-Sigma chapter of Tau Kappa Epsilon fraternity before opting to take a leave and further pursue music. Hauldren primarily DJed and made mashups under the alias Haul Pass throughout 2011.

Frederic Judson Kennett was born on October 19, 1997, to Jon and Anne Kennett. He focused on musical production under the alias Fatboy, while completing high school. Though both musicians were students at New Trier High School in Winnetka, IL (Hauldren in the class of 2015 and Kennett in the class of 2016), the two met at a Madeon concert in 2012.

In 2012, Hauldren entered a local DJ competition connected to Chicago's Spring Awakening Music Festival, which offered finalists the opprotunity to perform a short set at The Mid, a nightclub in Chicago. Kennett heard of this and reached out to Hauldren via Facebook, hoping to collaborate by teaching each other their respective skills; production and DJing. The two met at Kennett's home, where they recorded their first song together. After deciding to release the track, they chose the name Louis The Child using Wikipedia's "random article" feature. The meeting marked the official formation of the duo.

Louis the Child started playing at small venues through 2013 and 2014. In 2015, the band rose in popularity with the release of their single "It's Strange". Freddy Kennett was 17 at the time and still in high school. Robby Hauldren was beginning his freshman year at the University of Southern California. The single garnered praise from artists such as Taylor Swift, who added "It's Strange" as one of her "Songs that Will Make Life Awesome" and was featured on the FIFA 16 soundtrack. "It's Strange" was later featured in a commercial for the 2019 Nissan Kicks. They later opened for artists such as Madeon and The Chainsmokers. The duo embarked on their own tour on October 17, 2015, starting in Chicago.

In December 2016, Louis the Child joined forces with Pell and created the band Pellican Child, whose first single, "Turn Me Down", was released ahead of a six-track EP due for early 2017. Louis the Child was the opening act for the European leg of the Shelter Live Tour.

In 2017, the duo headlined a 32 show tour with support from Joey Purp, Lauv, Louis Futon, Prince Fox, Ashe, Party Pupils, Point Point, and Win & Woo, during which they made various contributions including playing a sold-out Thanksgiving show at the Aragon Ballroom. In late 2017, Louis the Child's song "Go" was featured in a TV commercial for the Apple iPad Pro.

In early 2018 they made an appearance at Lollapalooza South America. The festival took place in Chile, Argentina and Brazil. On April 10, 2018, the duo announced the release of their new single, "Better Not" featuring Australian singer, Wafia. As of April 2019, the track has garnered over 100 million streams on Spotify.

The duo's emergence continued in 2019 when it announced a performance at the Red Rocks Amphitheatre and a concert coinciding with the X Games.

The duo have repeatedly attributed their decision to name themselves Louis the Child after landing on the historic figure while seeking out inspiration through use of the "Random Article" button on Wikipedia.

== Musical influences ==
Hauldren cites Madeon, Flume, Porter Robinson, and Odesza as musical influences.

== Discography ==
=== Studio albums ===
List of studio albums, with release date and label shown
Title	Details	Peak chart positions	
Title	Details	US Heat	US Dance
Here for Now	Released: June 26, 2020; Label: Interscope; Formats: Digital download, streaming	8	6

=== Mixtapes ===
List of studio albums, with release date and label shown
Title	Details
Candy II	Released: October 2, 2020; Label: Interscope; Formats: Digital download, streaming
Black Marble	Released: December 2, 2022; Label: Interscope; Formats: Digital download, streaming

=== Extended plays ===
List of extended plays, with release date and label shown
Title	Details	Peak chart positions
Title	Details	US Dance
Dimensions	Released: December 2, 2013; Label: Prep School Recordings; Formats: Digital download	—
Love Is Alive	Released: March 24, 2017; Label: Ultra Music; Formats: Digital download, streaming	17
Kids at Play	Released: October 26, 2018; Label: Interscope; Formats: Digital download, streaming	8
Euphoria	Released: October 15, 2021; Label: Interscope; Formats: Digital download, streaming	—
To Believe	Released: April 22, 2022; Label: Interscope; Formats: Digital download, streaming	—
"—" denotes a single that did not chart or was not released in that territory.

=== Singles ===
==== As lead artist ====
List of singles as lead artist, with year released and album shown
Title	Year	Peak chart positions				Certifications	Album
Title	Year	US Dance	AUS	NZ Hot	UK Indie Brk.	Certifications	Album
"It's Strange" (featuring K.Flay)	2015	38	—	—	15	RIAA: Gold	Non-album singles
"From Here"	2016	—	—	—	—		Non-album singles
"Weekend" (featuring Icona Pop)	2016	—	—	—	—		Non-album singles
"Fire" (featuring Evalyn)	2016	30	—	—	—		Love Is Alive
"Love Is Alive" (featuring Elohim)	2017	42	—	—	—		Love Is Alive
"Slow Down Love" (featuring Chelsea Cutler)	2017	42	—	—	—		Love Is Alive
"Right to It" (featuring Ashe)	2017	33	—	—	—		Non-album singles
"Last to Leave" (featuring Caroline Ailin)	2017	35	—	—	—		Non-album singles
"Shake Something" (featuring Joey Purp)	2018	41	—	—	—		Non-album singles
"Better Not" (featuring Wafia)	2018	12	88	—	—	RIAA: Platinum; ARIA: Platinum	Kids at Play
"The City" (with Quinn XCII)	2018	24	—	—	—		Kids at Play
"Dear Sense" (with Max)	2018	26	—	—	—		Kids at Play
"Big Time (X Games Theme)"	2019	—	—	—	—		Non-album singles
"Too Close" (with Wrabel)	2019	40	—	—	—		Non-album singles
"Free" (with Drew Love)	2019	27	—	—	—		Here for Now
"Here Comes a Feeling" (with Naomi Wild and Couros)	2019	—	—	—	—		Non-album single
"Don't Mind"	2020	50	—	—	—		Here for Now
"Every Color" (with Foster the People)	2020	12	—	—	—		Here for Now
"Little Things" (with Quinn XCII and Chelsea Cutler)	2020	14	—	—	—		Here for Now
"Nobody Like You" (with Vera Blue)	2020	—	—	—	—		Here for Now
"Self Care" (with Coin)	2020	—	—	—	—		Non-album singles
"Somewhere Else" (with BabyJake)	2021	—	—	39	—		Non-album singles
"So What" (featuring Arizona)	2021	17	—	—	—		Euphoria
"Encinitas" (with Goth Babe)	2021	—	—	—	—		Non-album single
"Keep On Moving" (with Nez featuring Theophilus London)	2021	26	—	—	—		Euphoria
"Hate U Cuz I Don't" (featuring Bea Miller)	2021	24	—	—	—		Euphoria
"Hole In My Heart" (with Livingstone)	2021	20	—	—	—		Euphoria
"Blow The Roof" (with Kasbo and Evan Giia)	2022	24	—	—	—		To Believe
"Cry" (with Aluna)	2022	—	—	—	—		To Believe
"Falling" (with Njoma and Daniel Allan)	2024						The Sun Comes Up
"Believe It" (with Madeon)	2024						The Sun Comes Up
"Slow" (Pluko and Laszewo)	2024						The Sun Comes Up
"—" denotes a single that did not chart or was not released in that territory.

==== As featured artist ====
List of singles as featured artist
Title	Year	Album
"Hurts" (Wafia featuring Louis The Child and Whethan)	2019	Non-album single
"On Air" (What So Not featuring Louis The Child, Captain Cuts & JRM)	2022	Anomaly

=== Other charted songs ===
Title	Year	Peak chart positions		Album
Title	Year	US Dance	NZ Hot	Album
"Breaking News" (featuring Raye)	2018	45	31	Kids at Play
"Big Love" (featuring EarthGang)	2020	18	40	Here for Now
"Talk" (with Royal & the Serpent)	2022	35	—	To Believe

=== Remixes ===
Year	Title	Artist
2014	"Mastodon" (featuring Alina Renae)	Milk N Cookies
2014	"Hearts" (featuring Kelis)	Dan Black
2014	"Home by Now"	Bombay Bicycle Club
2014	"Buffalo Bill"	Moxie Raia
2014	"Paris"	Magic Man
2014	"Crazy" (featuring Jess Nitties)	Magnifikate
2014	"Compass"	Zella Day
2014	"Body Gold"	Oh Wonder
2014	"Inside Outside"	Chiefs and Nick Acquroff
2015	"Never Sleep Alone" (featuring Tess Comrie)	Kaskade
2015	"Discipline"	Club Cheval
2015	"Broken Record" (featuring Joni Fatora)	SoySauce
2016	"Blasé"	Ty Dolla Sign
2016	"I Wish"	The Knocks and Matthew Koma
2016	"Genghis Khan"	Miike Snow
2017	"All Night" (featuring Knox Fortune)	Chance the Rapper
2017	"Telegraph Ave. (Louis Futon and Louis the Child Flip)"	Childish Gambino
2019	"The Wave"	Elohim
2019	"I Dreamt We Spoke Again"	Death Cab for Cutie
