= Jeremy Zucker =

American singer (born 1996)

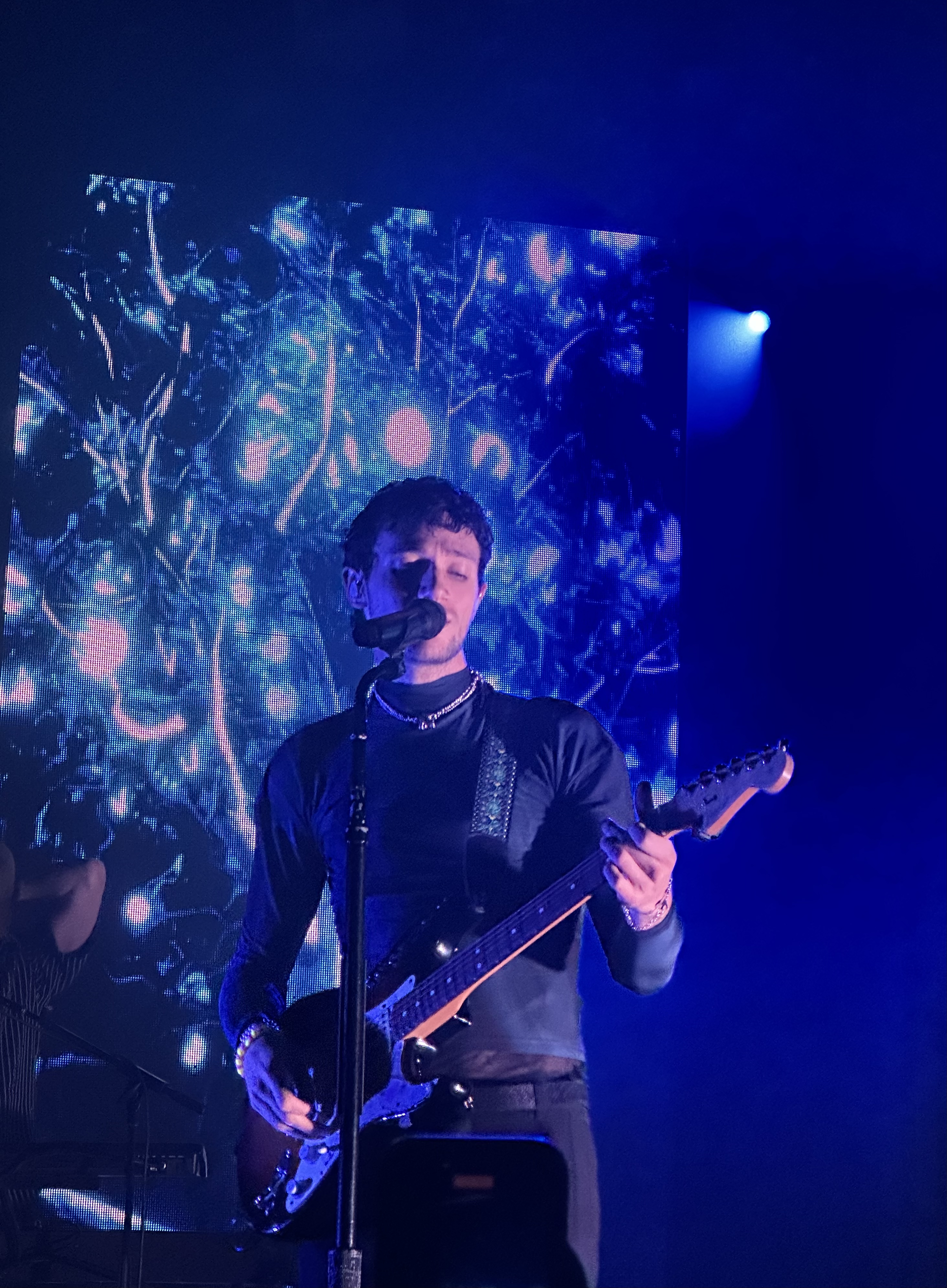
- Zucker in 2023

Background information
- Born: Jeremy Scott Zucker; March 3, 1996 (age 30); Franklin Lakes, New Jersey, U.S.
- Education: Colorado College
- Genres: Pop; indie pop; electronic; pop rock
- Occupations: Singer; songwriter; producer
- Years active: 2015–present
- Labels: Republic; 3OAK
- Spouse: Mathilda Röttger (m. 2024)
- Website: jeremyzuckermusic.com

Jeremy Scott Zucker (born March 3, 1996) is an American singer-songwriter, best known for his songs "Comethru", "You Were Good to Me", and "All the Kids Are Depressed". He has released multiple EPs and three albums, Love Is Not Dying (2020), Crusher (2021), and Garden State (2025).

== Early life ==
Originally from Franklin Lakes, New Jersey, Zucker was raised in a musical household with his parents and two older brothers. While a student at Ramapo High School, he began making music in his bedroom and later joined a band called the "Foreshadows". The first song he wrote was about his brother's fear of heights. After graduating high school, he attended Colorado College where he graduated in 2018 with a degree in molecular biology. Before producing his own music, his first job was as a snowboard instructor. He is Jewish and, as of 27 June 2024, married to influencer and model Mathilda Lou Roettger.

== Career ==
=== 2015–2019: Beach Island, Breathe, Motions, and Glisten ===
In 2015, Zucker self-released his debut EP Beach Island. The following year, he released Breathe (2016), which included the track "'Bout It," his first breakthrough hit.

In 2017, Zucker followed up with Motions, featuring the song "Heavy," which was later remixed by Blackbear into "Make Daddy Proud" and included on Blackbear's album Digital Druglord. The collaboration led to further work together, with Zucker and Blackbear co-releasing the single "Talk Is Overrated," which appeared on Zucker’s Idle EP.

Zucker continued to expand his catalog with Stripped in February 2018, showcasing acoustic arrangements, and Glisten in May 2018. In September 2018, he released Summer, which featured "Comethru." Written shortly after graduating college and returning to his childhood home in New Jersey, "Comethru" became one of Zucker’s most popular songs, earning international attention.

By the end of 2019, Zucker had established himself as a rising artist blending pop, R&B, and singer-songwriter styles, setting the stage for his later projects.

=== 2019–present: Brent, Love Is Not Dying, Brent II, Crusher, and Is Nothing Sacred?, and Brent III ===
In 2019, Zucker collaborated with singer Chelsea Cutler on "You Were Good to Me." The song was the lead single of their first collaborative EP Brent which was released on April 19, 2019.

On July 26, Zucker released "Oh, Mexico," the lead single for their debut album Love Is Not Dying. The subsequent singles "Always, I'll Care," "Not Ur Friend," and "Julia" were released on February 7, 2020, February 28, and March 24 respectively, leading up to the album's release on April 17. The album is an autobiographical collection of songs that were recorded in Brooklyn during the second half of 2019. On July 24, he released the single "Supercuts". They featured on Claire Rosinkranz's song "Backyard Boy" and "Nothing's the Same" with Alexander 23.

On January 15, 2021, Zucker and Cutler released "This Is How You Fall in Love", and they hosted the livestream show Brent: Live on the Internet, where they introduced Brent II, which was released on February 5. Beginning in June 2021, Zucker released the songs "18" on June 24, "Honest" on July 23, "Cry with You" on August 20, and "Therapist" on September 17 as singles for his sophomore album Crusher which was released on October 1, 2021.

Zucker released "Internet Crush" on February 10, 2023. This was followed by the release of the next single, "OK", along with the music video for the track. Their third EP, entitled Is Nothing Sacred?, was released on June 9, 2023, which featured "Internet Crush" as the lead single, followed by "OK". The EP contains three other songs, entitled "Cindy", "I Need You (In My Life)”, and "A Dying World...".

On September 29, 2023, he released a single titled "This time" in celebration of the 5th anniversary of his EP Summer..

On May 22, 2024, Zucker released a collaboration song titled "Cozy" with artists Lauv and Alexander 23.

Ahead of the release of Brent III, Zucker and Cutler released track 5 of the anticipated project, titled "Black & White" on September 13, 2024.

On October 11, 2024, track 2 of Brent III was released, titled "A-frame".

On November 1, 2024, Brent III was released as an album in collaboration with Cutler.

On August 22, 2025, Zucker's third album Garden State, was released nearly four years since their last solo album.

== Influences ==
Zucker has cited Blink-182, Jon Bellion, blackbear, Eden, Bon Iver, Mac Miller, and Wet as some of his musical influences.

Zucker describes himself as a "social introvert".

== Discography ==
=== Studio albums ===
Title	Details	Peak chart positions			
Title	Details	US	AUS	BEL (FL)	NZ
Love Is Not Dying	Released: April 17, 2020; Label: Republic; Formats: CD, vinyl, cassette, digital download, streaming	57	40	124	38
Crusher	Released: October 1, 2021; Label: Republic; Formats: CD, vinyl, digital download, streaming	—	—	—	—
Garden State	Released: August 22, 2025; Label: Mercury Records; Formats: CD, vinyl, digital download, streaming	—	—	—	—

=== Collaborative albums ===
Title	Details
Brent III (with Chelsea Cutler)	Released: November 1, 2024; Label: CC Ventures, LLC, Anything Anywhere LLC, Mercury Records; Formats: Digital download, streaming

=== Compilation albums ===
Title	Details
Archive 001	Released: July 23, 2026; Label: Independent; Formats: USB, digital download, streaming

=== Live albums ===
Title	Details
Brent (Live in New York) (with Chelsea Cutler)	Released: July 19, 2019; Label: CC Ventures, LLC, Republic; Formats: Digital download, streaming
Brent: Live from the Internet (with Chelsea Cutler)	Released: May 5, 2021; Label: CC Ventures, LLC, Republic; Formats: Digital download, streaming

=== EPs ===
Title	Details
Beach Island	Released: October 30, 2015; Label: Independent; Formats: Digital download, streaming
Breathe	Released: December 6, 2015; Label: 3OAK; Formats: Digital download, streaming
Motions	Released: May 26, 2017; Label: 3OAK, Republic; Formats: Digital download, streaming
Idle	Released: October 27, 2017; Label: Republic; Formats: Digital download, streaming
Stripped.	Released: February 2, 2018; Label: Republic; Formats: Digital download, streaming
Glisten	Released: May 4, 2018; Label: Republic; Formats: Digital download, streaming
Summer,	Released: September 28, 2018; Label: Republic; Formats: Digital download, streaming
Brent (with Chelsea Cutler)	Released: May 3, 2019; Label: CC Ventures, LLC, Republic; Formats: Digital download, streaming, Vinyl
Brent II (with Chelsea Cutler)	Released: February 5, 2021; Label: CC Ventures, LLC, Republic; Formats: Digital download, streaming, Vinyl
Is Nothing Sacred?	Released: June 9, 2023; Label: Mercury Records, Republic; Formats: Digital download, streaming

=== Singles ===
==== As lead artist ====
Title	Year	Peak chart positions		Certifications	Album
Title	Year	KOR	NZ Hot	Certifications	Album
"Melody"	2015	—	—		Beach Island
"Flying Kites"	2015	—	—		Beach Island
"'Bout It" (featuring Daniel James and Benjamin O)	2015	—	—		Breathe
"Dramamine"	2015	—	—		Non-album singles
"Peace Signs"	2016	—	—		Non-album singles
"Weakness"	2016	—	—		Non-album singles
"Paradise" (featuring Cisco the Nomad)	2016	—	—		Non-album singles
"When You Wake Up..."	2016	—	—		Non-album singles
"Upside Down" (featuring Daniel James)	2016	—	—		Motions
"IDK Love"	2017	—	—		Motions
"Talk Is Overrated" (featuring Blackbear)	2017	—	—	RIAA: Gold; MC: Gold; ARIA: Gold	Idle
"All the Kids Are Depressed"	2018	—	—	RIAA: Platinum; MC: Gold; ARIA: Platinum	Glisten
"Comethru" (solo or featuring Bea Miller)	2018	59	—	RIAA: Platinum; ARIA: 2× Platinum; MC: Platinum; KMCA: Platinum	Summer and Love Is Not Dying
"You Were Good to Me" (with Chelsea Cutler)	2019	—	—	RIAA: Platinum; MC: Platinum; ARIA: 2× Platinum	Brent and Love Is Not Dying
"Better Off" (with Chelsea Cutler)	2019	—	—	RIAA: Gold; ARIA: Gold; MC: Gold	Brent
"Oh, Mexico"	2019	—	—		Love Is Not Dying
"Always, I'll Care"	2020	178	23	ARIA: Gold	Love Is Not Dying
"Not Ur Friend"	2020	—	11		Love Is Not Dying
"Julia"	2020	—	—		Love Is Not Dying
"Supercuts"	2020	199	—		Non-album single
"This Is How You Fall in Love" (with Chelsea Cutler)	2021	—	9	ARIA: Gold	Brent II
"Emily" (with Chelsea Cutler)	2021	—	27		Brent II
"18"	2021	—	—		Crusher
"Honest"	2021	—	—		Crusher
"Cry with You"	2021	—	—		Crusher
"Therapist"	2021	—	—		Crusher
"I'm So Happy" (featuring Benee)	2022	—	27		Non-album single
"Internet Crush"	2023	—	—		Is Nothing Sacred?
"OK"	2023	—	—		Is Nothing Sacred?
"This Time"	2023	—	—		Non-album singles
"Cozy" (with Lauv & Alexander 23)	2024	—	—		Non-album singles
"Black & White" (with Chelsea Cutler)	2024	—	—		Brent III
"A-Frame" (with Chelsea Cutler)	2024	—	—		Brent III
"Hometown"	2025	—	—		Garden State
"Surprise!"	2025	—	—		Garden State
"—" denotes a release that did not chart or was not released in that territory.

==== As featured artist ====
Title	Year	Album
"Glow" (Justice Skolnik and Jeremy Zucker)	2015	Non-album single
"Good Days" (Ricky Smith and Jeremy Zucker)	2016	Release
"Lonely Alone" (Chelsea Cutler featuring Jeremy Zucker)	2018	Sleeping with Roses
"Stay with Me" (Ayokay featuring Jeremy Zucker)	2018	In the Shape of a Dream
"Atoms" (RL Grime with Jeremy Zucker)	2018	Nova
"Spin with You" (Emma Sameth with Wolfe and Jeremy Zucker)	2018	Non-album single
"Cameras" (Justice Skolnik with Jeremy Zucker)	2019	Bliss
"Backyard Boy" (Claire Rosinkranz with Jeremy Zucker)	2020	Non-album singles
"Nothing's the Same" (Alexander 23 with Jeremy Zucker)	2020	Oh No, Not Again
"Doris Terrace" (Quinn XCII with Jeremy Zucker and Ayokay)	2021	Change of Scenery II
"That Way" (Tate McRae with Jeremy Zucker)	2021	Non-album single
"Breaking Through" (El Capitxn with Taehyun and Jeremy Zucker)	2026	Non-album single

==== Remixes ====
- 2018: Atoms – Said the Sky Remix (RL Grime with Jeremy Zucker, Said the Sky)
- 2018: Talk Is Overrated [Manila Killa Remix] (Jeremy Zucker with Blackbear and Manila Killa)
- 2018: Better Off [Filous Remix] (Jeremy Zucker with Chelsea Cutler and Filous)
- 2020: You Were Good to Me [Shallou Remix] (Jeremy Zucker with Chelsea Cutler and Shallou)

=== Songwriting credits ===
List of songs written or co-written for other artists, showing year released and album name
Title	Year	Artist(s)	Album
"Make Daddy Proud"	2017	Blackbear	Digital Druglord
"Holding Hands"	2019	Quinn XCII, Elohim	From Michigan with Love
"Finding the Way"	2020	Jonny Sum	Non-album single
"Cosplay"	2022	Alexander 23	Aftershock
"Come 2 Brazil"	2023	Alice Longyu Gao	Let's Hope Heteros Fail, Learn and Retire
"Angst"	2023	LIA LIA	Angst

=== Production credits ===
List of songs produced or co-produced for other artists, showing year released and album name
Title	Year	Artist(s)	Album
"Make Daddy Proud"	2017	Blackbear	Digital Druglord
"Lady by the Sea"	2020	Stephen Sanchez	Non-album single
"The Stars"	2021	Chelsea Cutler	Brent II
"New Things"	2022	Natasha Hunt Lee	Non-album single
"Cosplay"	2022	Alexander 23	Aftershock
"Handgun"	2023	Jake Minch	Non-album singles
"Bad Guy"	2023	Grace Enger	Non-album singles
"Angst"	2023	LIA LIA	Angst
"bojack baby"	2024	Sophie Cates	SUPERNOVA
"the cage"	2025	Kevin Atwater	Achilles
"Aura"	2025	Danny Dwyer	From the horse's mouth

== Tours ==
=== Headlining ===
- Tour Is Overrated (2017)
- Anything, Anywhere Tour (2018–2019)
- More Noise!!!! Tour (2021–2022)
- is nothing sacred? The Tour (2023)
- Brent Forever: The Tour (2024; with Chelsea Cutler)
- Welcome To The Garden State Tour (2025)

=== Livestream ===
- Brent: Live on the Internet (2021; with Chelsea Cutler) (altered due to the COVID-19 pandemic)

=== Supporting ===
- I Met You When I Was 18 World Tour (2018; for Lauv; in the United States)
- Bleed for You Tour (2023; for the Kid Laroi; in the United States)
