= Ayokay =

American producer and DJ

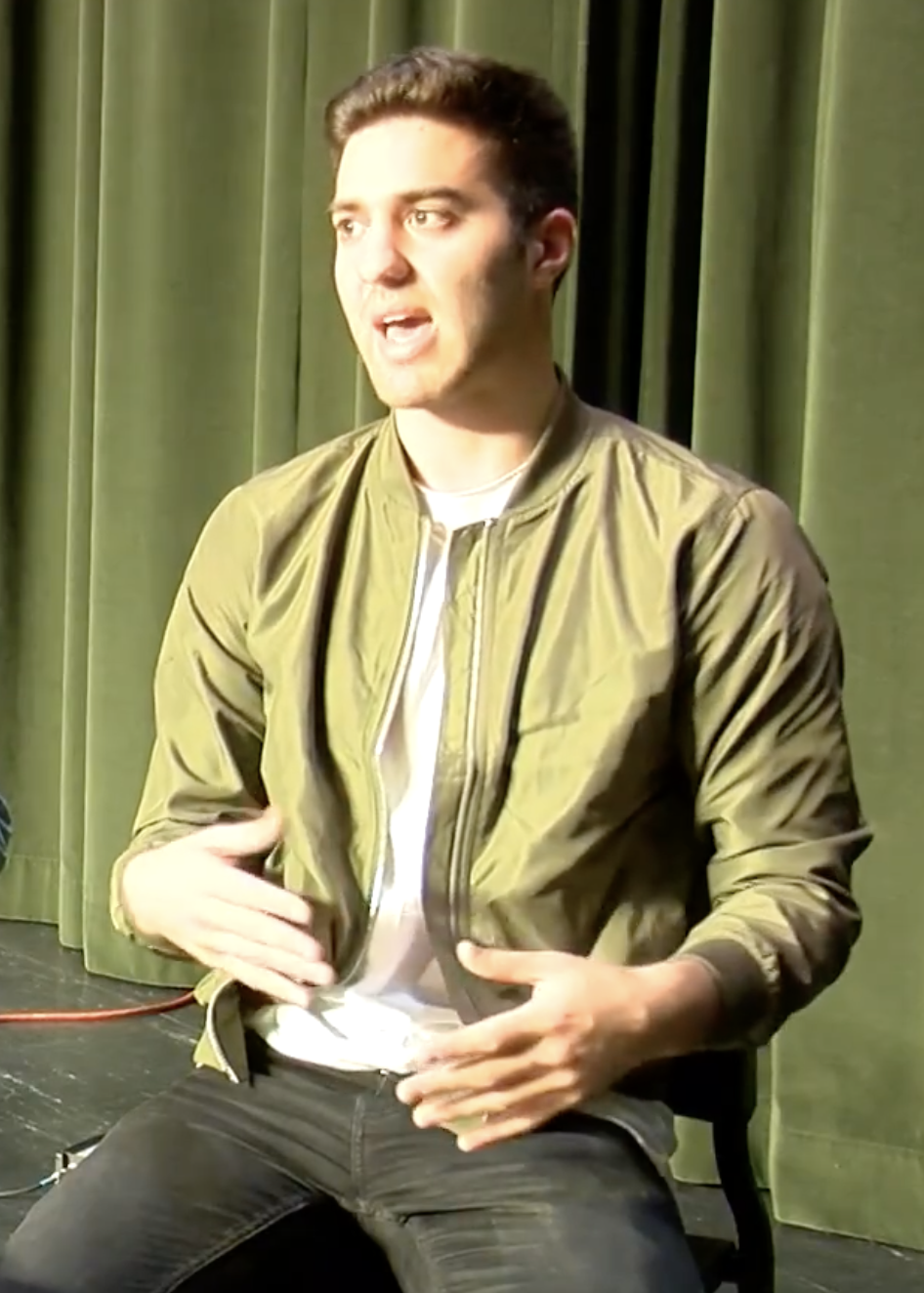
- O'Neill in 2017

Background information
- Born: Alex O'Neill; Grosse Pointe, Michigan
- Origin: Grosse Pointe, Michigan
- Genres: Electronic; EDM
- Years active: 2016–present
- Labels: Columbia Records; Astralwerks
- Website: www.everythingisayokay.com

Alex O'Neill, better known as Ayokay, is an American producer and DJ from Grosse Pointe, Michigan.

O'Neill attended high school with Mikael Temrowski, who would go on to perform under the name Quinn XCII; the pair worked together while both were college students at different universities in Michigan. Their 2016 single "Kings of Summer" was chosen by Ian Desmond, then a baseball player for the Texas Rangers, as his walk-up music, which increased the track's popularity and led to a record deal with Columbia.

O'Neill then moved to Los Angeles, releasing a full-length album, In the Shape of a Dream, which featured various artists including Jeremy Zucker, Quinn XCII, Nightly, Jenny Mayhem, Future Jr., and Katie Pearlman in 2018. He has had two hit singles on the Billboard Hot Dance/Electronic Songs Chart: "Kings of Summer" with Quinn XCII, which reached #18 in 2016, and "The Shine" with Chelsea Cutler, which reached #50 in 2017. He released his second album Digital Dreamscape in 2022.

== Discography ==
Albums
Title	Year released	Details
In the Shape of a Dream	2018	Label: Columbia Records; Song count: 10; Formats: Digital Download, Streaming
Digital Dreamscape	2022	Label: UMG Recordings, Inc.; Song count: 13; Formats: Digital Download, Streaming

Singles & EPs
Title	Year released	Details
We Come Alive (Side A)	2019	Label: Columbia Records; Type: EP; Formats: Digital Download, Streaming
"Sleeping Next to You"	2019	Label: Columbia Records; Type: Single; Formats: Digital Download, Streaming
"California Will Never Rest"	2019	Label: Columbia Records; Type: Single; Formats: Digital Download, Streaming
"Move On"	2019	Label: Columbia Records; Type: Single; Formats: Digital Download, Streaming
"Cassette"	2017	Label: Columbia Records; Type: Single; Formats: Digital Download, Streaming
"Too Young" (with Baker Grace)	2017	Label: Columbia Records; Type: Single; Formats: Digital Download, Streaming
"The Shine" (with Chelsea Cutler)	2017	Label: Columbia Records; Type: Single; Formats: Digital Download, Streaming
4 ft to Infinity	2016	Label: Columbia Records; Type: EP; Formats: Digital Download, Streaming
"Kings of Summer" (with Quinn XCII)	2016	Label: Columbia Records; Type: Single; Formats: Digital Download, Streaming
