= Coin (band) =

American indie pop band

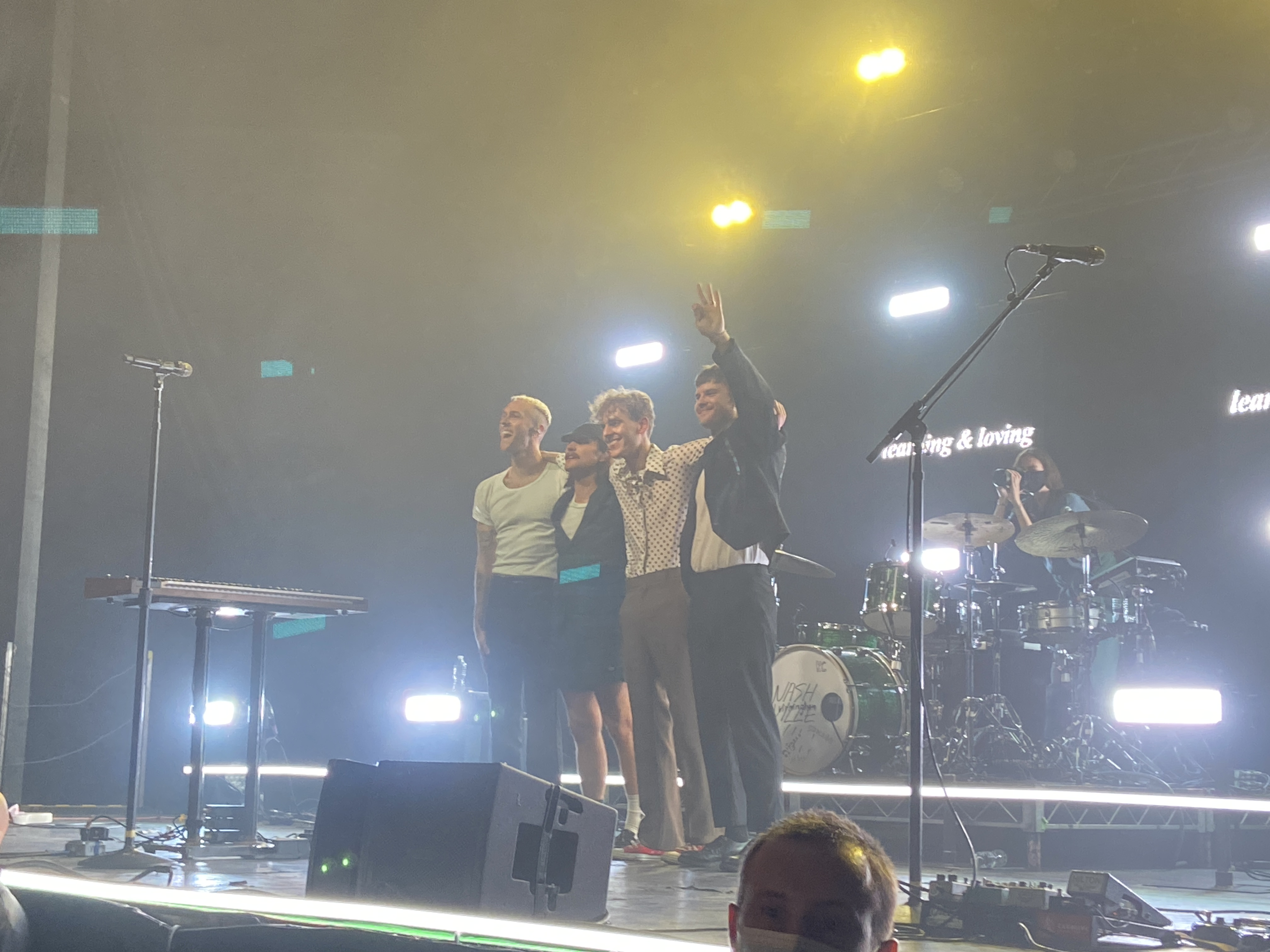
- Coin performing in Salt Lake City in 2021

Background information
- Origin: Nashville, Tennessee
- Genres: Indie pop; pop rock; alternative rock; new wave
- Years active: 2012–2025
- Labels: Columbia; Startime; 10K Projects
- Past members: Chase Lawrence; Joe Memmel; Zachary Dyke; Ryan Winnen
- Website: thisiscoin.com

Coin (often stylized as COIN) was an American pop rock band formed in 2012 in Nashville, Tennessee. The band originally released two EPs, one in 2012 (Saturdays) and one in 2013 (1992). They subsequently gained mainstream attention in 2015 with the lead single "Run" from their self-titled debut album, which was produced by Jay Joyce and released later the same year by Columbia.

The group gained further success in 2016 with the lead single "Talk Too Much" from the band's second studio album, How Will You Know If You Never Try, which was released on April 21, 2017. The song was their first to chart on Billboard's Alternative Songs chart.

Coin disbanded at the end of January 2025 due to allegations of misconduct.

== History ==
=== 2012–2014: Early years ===
Coin was formed in 2012 by Chase Lawrence, Ryan Winnen, Joe Memmel, and Zach Dyke. Lawrence, Memmel and Dyke were students at Belmont University. Lawrence and Memmel were classmates who often sat next to each other in music theory classes. After they decided to try writing music together, Winnen and Dyke were introduced to them through mutual friends. The band then decided that they needed recorded music in order for promoters to book them to play live, so they recorded four songs at their school and released them for free on the internet. When they started playing local shows around Nashville, the band quickly attracted a highly enthusiastic and loyal live following. Prior to the release of their debut album, they released two EPs: Saturdays in late 2012, and 1992 in 2013. The song "Atlas" was released as a single in August 2013 from the EP 1992. "Time Machine" was released as a non-album single in October 2013. Both "Atlas" and "Time Machine" were later re-recorded and put on the band's debut album. In March 2014, the band released a re-recorded version of their song, "It's Okay", as a non-album single.

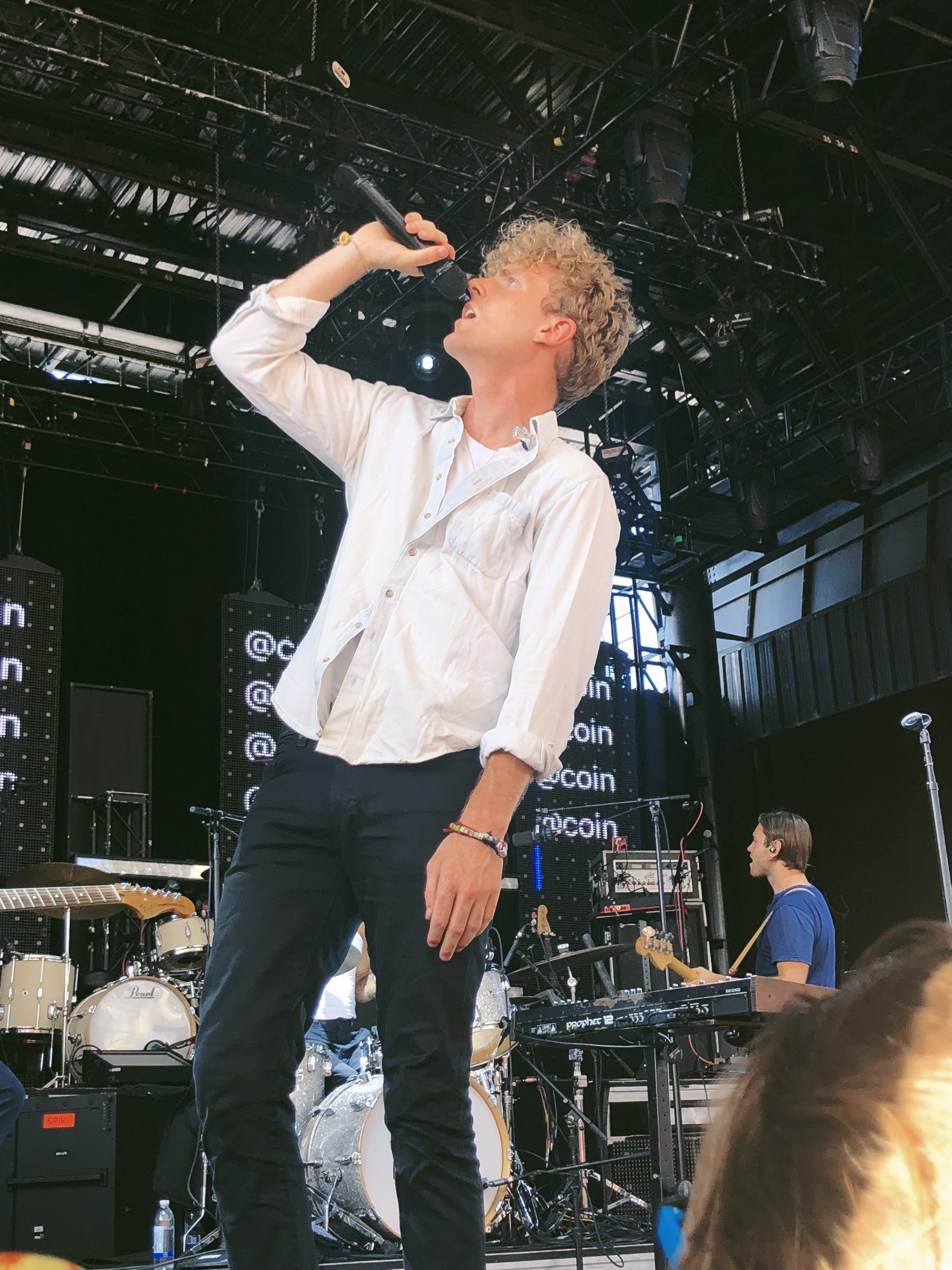
Chase Lawrence of Coin performing in 2019

=== 2015: Coin ===
The group released their single, "Run", in early 2015 and were hailed by Billboard as "new wave crash-course survivors," destined to "break the Nashville mold." The song received positive reviews, as well as heavy airplay on Sirius' Alt Nation radio station. On June 9, 2015, the band released their self-titled debut album Coin, produced by Jay Joyce. Looking back, the band called the record "precious," as well as admitting "there are a lot of little things that will always be a part of [their] DNA from that album."

=== 2016–2018: How Will You Know if You Never Try ===
After touring for the release of their first album, the band released the first single from their second album in May 2016, "Talk Too Much". In February 2017, the band released "I Don't Wanna Dance" as the next single from their forthcoming album. In March 2017, a re-recorded version of their song "Malibu" from their EP 1992 was released as the first promotional single, re-titled "Malibu 1992." Two weeks later on March 23, 2017, the group announced the title of their second album: How Will You Know If You Never Try. Following the announcement of the album, the band released the second promotional single, "Feeling," on March 31, 2017. The album was released worldwide on April 21, 2017.

On February 8, 2018, the single, "Growing Pains", was released as a follow-up to the 2017 album.

=== 2018–2020: Dreamland ===
After releasing How Will You Know If You Never Try, they gradually released the singles "Simple Romance," "Cemetery," "I Want it All," and "Crash My Car." Their third album, Dreamland, was released on February 21, 2020 on their own independent label, The Committee for Sound & Mind and AWAL.

In 2020, they announced their Dreamland Tour that was set to cover several states across the United States. However, they were forced to postpone several shows on this tour due to the COVID-19 outbreak.

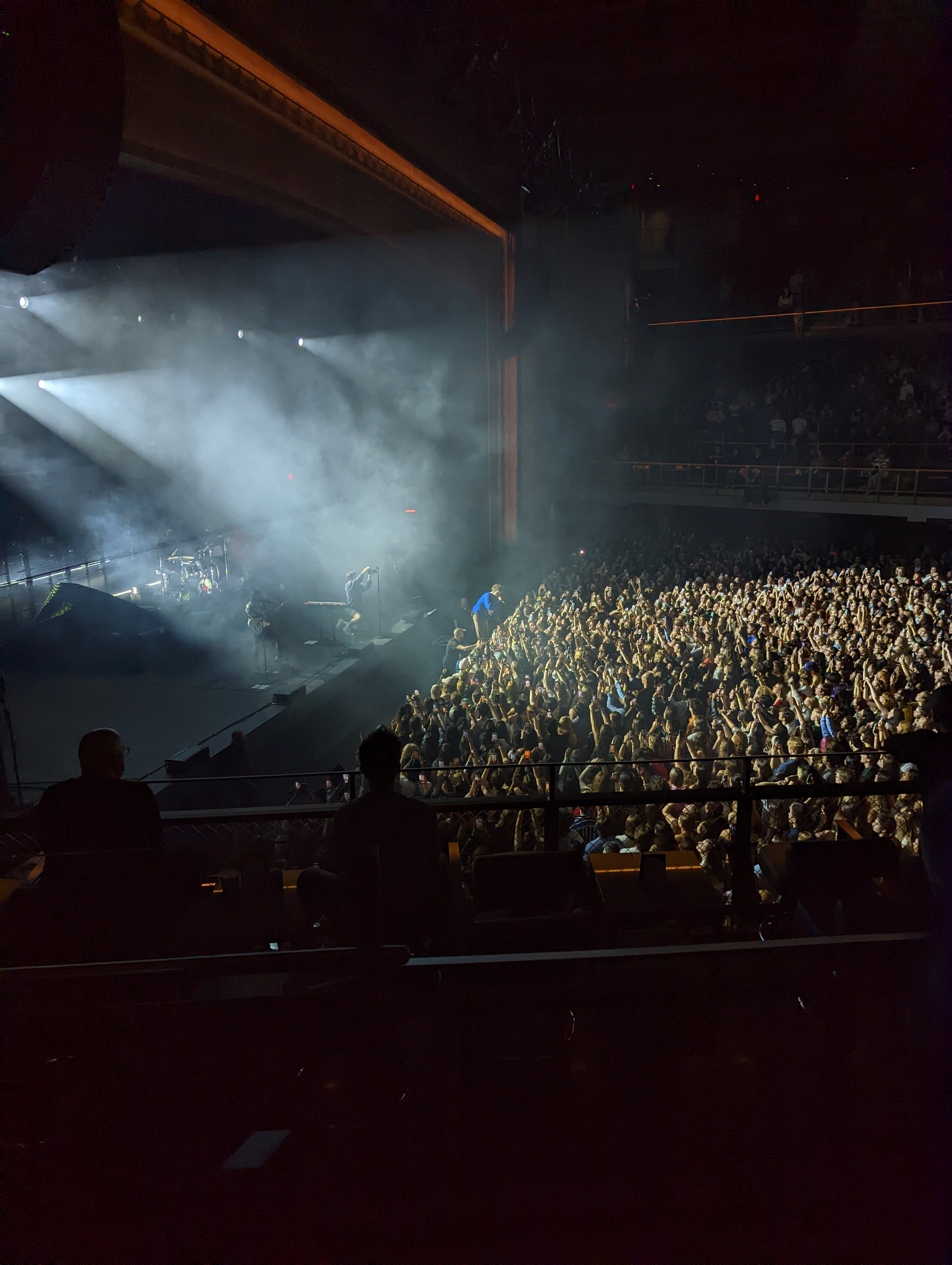
Coin performing at MGM Music Hall at Fenway on 9/23/2022

=== 2021–2023: Rainbow Mixtape and Uncanny Valley ===
On September 18, 2020, Coin returned with a new single, You Are The Traffic. This was the first release from a new EP, Indigo-Violet which released on October 22, 2020. Just three weeks earlier, the band announced a new project titled Rainbow Mixtape which would be 12 songs split into three different EPs that each represented a different color of the rainbow. They described the record as an exploration of "all the colors we can create together," nodding to the project's sonic differences from their older work. One of the key messages of the project is "Don't turn your back on the ones who don't turn their back on you."

In September 2021, Coin brought out a new single, Chapstick. This marked the beginning of a new album cycle, culminating in the March 25, 2022 release of the band's fourth studio album, Uncanny Valley, featuring fourteen new songs. As part of the Uncanny Valley tour, Coin performed their largest show to date at MGM Music Hall at Fenway on September 23, 2022.

=== 2024–2025: I'm Not Afraid of Music Anymore and disbandment ===
On June 7, 2024, the band released a new song titled "Strawberry Jam" along with an accompanying music video on YouTube.

On June 20, 2024, Coin announced their fifth studio album, I'm Not Afraid of Music Anymore, to be released on September 13, 2024.

On July 12, 2024, the band released the album's second single titled "Take It Or Leave It" along with an accompanying music video on YouTube. The album's third single, "Slack," was released on August 8, 2024.

The album was released on September 13, 2024 via 10K Projects.

On January 28, 2025, lead singer Chase Lawrence announced that Coin had disbanded due to allegations of unspecified misconduct against the band's drummer Ryan Winnen and guitarist Joe Memmel.

On March 8, 2025, San Diego Studio announced the band's song “Take It Or Leave It” would be featured in their game MLB: The Show.

== Members ==
Former

- Chase Lawrence – lead vocals, synthesizers (2012–2025)
- Joe Memmel – guitars, backing vocals (2012–2025)
- Zachary Dyke – bass guitar (2012–2018)
- Ryan Winnen – drums, percussion (2012–2024)

Touring

- Matt Martin – bass guitar (2018–2025)

== Discography ==
=== Studio albums ===
List of studio albums, with selected chart positions, sales, and certifications
Title	Album details	Peak chart positions	
Title	Album details	US	US Heat.
COIN	Released: June 9, 2015; Label: Startime, Columbia; Format: CD, LP, digital download	—	21
How Will You Know If You Never Try	Released: April 21, 2017; Label: Startime, Columbia; Format: CD, LP, digital download	177	2
Dreamland	Released: February 21, 2020; Label: The Committee for Sound & Mind and AWAL; Format: Digital download	—	18
Rainbow Mixtape	Released: April 30, 2021; Label: The Committee for Sound & Mind and AWAL; Format: Digital download	—	—
Uncanny Valley	Released: March 25, 2022; Label: 10K Projects; Format: CD, LP, digital download	—	12
I'm Not Afraid of Music Anymore	Released: September 13, 2024; Label: 10K Projects; Format: CD, LP, digital download	—	—
"—" denotes a recording that did not chart or was not released in that territory.

=== Singles ===
List of singles by COIN
Year	Title	Peak chart positions				Certification	Album or Extended Play
Year	Title	US Rock	US Alt	US Rock Airplay	US AAA	Certification	Album or Extended Play
2013	"Atlas"	—	—	—	—		COIN
2013	"Time Machine"	—	—	—	—		COIN
2014	"It's Okay"	—	—	—	—		Non-album single
2015	"Run"	—	—	—	—		COIN
2016	"Talk Too Much"	28	8	16	—	RIAA: Gold	How Will You Know If You Never Try
2017	"I Don't Wanna Dance"	—	—	—	—		How Will You Know If You Never Try
2018	"Growing Pains"	—	—	—	—		Non-album single
2018	"Simple Romance"	—	—	—	—		Dreamland
2018	"Cemetery"	—	—	—	—		Dreamland
2019	"I Want It All"	—	—	—	—		Dreamland
2019	"Crash My Car"	—	—	—	—		Dreamland
2019	"Let It All Out (10:05)"	—	—	—	—		Dreamland
2020	"Youuu"	—	—	—	—		Dreamland
2020	"Valentine"	—	—	—	—		Dreamland
2020	"You Are the Traffic"	—	—	—	—		Rainbow Mixtape/Indigo Violet
2020	"Self Care" (with Louis the Child)	—	—	—	—		Here for Now
2020	"Sort It Out"	—	—	—	—		Rainbow Mixtape/Indigo Violet
2021	"Sagittarius Superstar" (feat. Faye Webster)	—	—	—	—		Rainbow Mixtape/Green Blue
2021	"How It Feels"	—	—	—	—		Rainbow Mixtape/Red Orange
2021	"Chapstick"	—	15	20	1		Uncanny Valley
2022	"Cutie"	—	—	—	—		Uncanny Valley
2022	"I Think I Met You In a Dream"	—	—	—	—		Uncanny Valley
2022	"Brad Pitt"	—	—	—	38		Uncanny Valley
2024	"Strawberry Jam"	—	—	—	—		I'm Not Afraid of Music Anymore
2024	"Take It Or Leave It"	—	—	—	—		I'm Not Afraid of Music Anymore
2024	"Slack"	—	—	—	—		I'm Not Afraid of Music Anymore
"—" denotes a recording that did not chart or was not released in that territory.

=== Music videos ===
Year	Song	Album
2015	"Run"	COIN
2016	"I Would"	COIN
2016	"Talk Too Much"	How Will You Know If You Never Try
2017	"I Don't Wanna Dance"	How Will You Know If You Never Try
2018	"Simple Romance"	Dreamland
2019	"I Want It All"	Dreamland
2019	"Let It All Out (10:05)"	Dreamland
2020	"Into My Arms"	Rainbow Mixtape/Indigo Violet
2020	"You Are The Traffic"	Rainbow Mixtape/Indigo Violet
2020	"Sort It Out"	Rainbow Mixtape/Indigo Violet
2020	"Make It Stop"	Rainbow Mixtape/Indigo Violet
2021	"Sagittarius Superstar" (Feat. Faye Webster)	Rainbow Mixtape/Green Blue
2021	"Earth to God"	Rainbow Mixtape/Green Blue
2021	"Chapstick"	Uncanny Valley
2022	"Cutie"	Uncanny Valley
2022	"Brad Pitt"	Uncanny Valley
2024	"Strawberry Jam"	I'm Not Afraid of Music Anymore
2024	"Take It Or Leave It"	I'm Not Afraid of Music Anymore
2024	"Slack"	I'm Not Afraid of Music Anymore
2024	"It's Hard To Care About Everything"	I'm Not Afraid of Music Anymore
2024	"Bloodtype"	I'm Not Afraid of Music Anymore
2024	"222"	I'm Not Afraid of Music Anymore
2024	"Along For The Ride"	I'm Not Afraid of Music Anymore
2024	"Problem"	I'm Not Afraid of Music Anymore

== Tours ==
Since their formation in 2012, the band had gone on several tours. In 2015, they opened for many artists including Neon Trees and Colony House. They also went on tour that year for the release of their self-titled debut album. In 2016, they continued opening for bands. Some of the groups they toured with include The 1975, Bad Suns, and Saint Motel.

After the release of their second album, titled How Will You Know If You Never Try, they played 36 shows across the United States. The North American How Will You Know If You Never Try tour occurred during 2017 and 2018. In October 2018, they played three shows in the Philippines as an extension of their previous tour.

In February and March 2019, they toured 13 venues on their Paradise of Thought tour. In Summer of 2019, they toured 24 cities, supporting Young the Giant and Fitz and the Tantrums. In fall of 2019, they went on their Album 3 Part 1 tour where they played 23 locations across the US and Canada. Throughout the years, the band has also played several festivals including Lollapalooza, SandJam Festival, and Music Midtown. On February 24, 2020, it was announced that they would be opening acts for Australian band, 5 Seconds of Summer, for the UK arena concert dates on their Take My Hand World Tour. Initially set to take place between May 11, 2020, to May 21, 2020, the UK leg of the tour was postponed due to the coronavirus pandemic. The UK shows began on April 7, 2022, at the SSE Hydro Arena in Glasgow, Scotland, with the band serving as the opening act for eight out of nine shows.

The band announced the tour for their upcoming album, I'm Not Afraid of Music Anymore, on Instagram on June 21, 2024. The North American tour spanned September 29, 2024, through November 9, 2024. A second leg of the tour scheduled to take place from February 8, 2025, to March 4, 2025 was cancelled upon COIN's breakup. Alongside the album, the band released a branding package based on the album's name, including a website that generates text so fans can fill in the blank and post a custom "I'm Not Afraid of ___ Anymore" image on social media. The tour was subsequently named "I'm Not Afraid of Tour Anymore."

=== Headlining ===
- How Will You Know If You Never Try Tour (2017–2018)
- Paradise of Thought Tour (2019)
- Rainbow Dreamland Tour (2021)
- Uncanny Valley Tour (2022)
- I'm Not Afraid of Tour Anymore (2024)

=== Supporting ===
- Take My Hand World Tour (2022)
