= Chelsea Cutler =

American musician (born 1997)

- Born: Chelsea Emily Cutler; February 11, 1997 (age 29)
- Origin: Westport, Connecticut, U.S.
- Genres: Pop; electronic
- Occupations: Singer; songwriter; producer
- Years active: 2015–present
- Labels: Republic; Ultra
- Website: chelseacutler.com

Chelsea Emily Cutler (born February 11, 1997) is an American singer, songwriter, and producer from Westport, Connecticut. She released her debut studio album, How to Be Human, in January 2020 through Republic Records. It peaked at number 23 on the Billboard 200 chart.

== Early life and education ==
Chelsea Cutler was born and raised in Westport. She played acoustic musical instruments as a child moving into producing electronic music in high school. While in high school at the Pomfret School in 2014, Cutler began posting covers and original songs on her own SoundCloud page. She continued posting music to SoundCloud while attending Amherst College in Massachusetts; she also played varsity soccer there. Cutler later decided to drop out of college to pursue music full-time after she was offered a support role on Quinn XCII's national tour in 2018.

== Career ==
By 2017, several of Cutler's songs (including "Your Shirt") garnered numerous streams and led to collaborations that year with acts including Louis the Child ("Slow Down Love"), Ayokay ("The Shine"), Kidswaste ("Tonight" and "More Colors"), and Kasbo ("Found You"). She signed a record deal with Ultra Records in late 2017 and released her first EP, Snow In October. After touring with Quinn XCII in early 2018, Cutler released two independent mixtapes, Sleeping with Roses and Sleeping with Roses II. She also went on her first two nationwide headlining tours each in support of a mixtape, both of which sold out in advance.

In March 2019, she signed to Republic Records and released a joint EP, brent, with friend and label-mate Jeremy Zucker shortly afterwards. The EP features the single "You Were Good to Me", which they performed live on The Today Show. In May 2019, Cutler collaborated with Kygo on the single, "Not OK". It became her third collaboration (after "Slow Down Love" and "The Shine") to appear on the Billboard Dance/Electronic Songs chart peaking at number 9.

In late 2019, Cutler began releasing new singles, including "How To Be Human" and "Lucky" (featuring Alexander 23). Along with "Sad Tonight", the songs served as the primary singles for her debut studio album, How To Be Human, released on January 17, 2020, by Republic Records. On January 23, 2020, she performed the lead single, "Sad Tonight", on Late Night With Seth Meyers. That song became Cutler's first entry on the Billboard Mainstream Top 40 airplay chart, peaking at number 32 in March 2020. In April 2020, she was featured alongside Quinn XCII on the Louis the Child track, "Little Things".

Cutler was slated to perform at Coachella 2020, which was canceled due to the COVID-19 pandemic. In June 2020, she released a version of her song "Crazier Things" which features Noah Kahan.

On December 31, 2022, Cutler sang John Lennon's song "Imagine" in Times Square on New Year's Eve, making her the youngest artist to do so at the age of 25.

== Discography ==
=== Studio albums ===
List of studio albums with selected details
Title	Details	Peak chart positions	
Title	Details	US	CAN
How to Be Human	Released: January 17, 2020; Label: Republic; Formats: Digital download, streaming, CD	23	51
When I Close My Eyes	Released: October 15, 2021; Label: Republic; Formats: Digital download, streaming, CD	—	—
Stellaria	Released: October 13, 2023; Label: Republic, Mercury Records; Formats: Digital download, streaming, CD, LP	—	—
Is This the End?	Released: September 25, 2026; Label: Mercury Records; Formats: Digital download, streaming, CD	—	—

=== Collaborative albums ===
List of mixtapes with selected details
Title	Details
Brent III (with Jeremy Zucker)	Released: November 1, 2024; Label: CC Ventures LLC, Mercury Records; Formats: Digital download, streaming

=== Mixtapes ===
List of mixtapes with selected details
Title	Details
Sleeping with Roses	Released: June 8, 2018; Label: Independent; Formats: Digital download, streaming
Sleeping with Roses II	Released: November 9, 2018; Label: Independent; Formats: Digital download, streaming
If I Could Just Stop The Time, (May 2024-May 2025)	Released: May 9, 2025 (US); Label: Mercury, CC Ventures LLC; Formats: Digital download, streaming

=== Live albums ===
List of live albums with selected details
Title	Details
Brent (Live in New York) (with Jeremy Zucker)	Released: July 19, 2019 (US); Label: Republic; Formats: Digital download, streaming
Brent: Live From the Internet (with Jeremy Zucker)	Released: May 5, 2021; Label: Republic; Formats: Digital download, streaming

=== EPs ===
List of EPs with selected details
Title	Details
Snow in October	Released: October 6, 2017 (US); Label: Ultra; Formats: Digital download, streaming
Brent (with Jeremy Zucker)	Released: May 3, 2019 (US); Label: Republic; Formats: Digital download, streaming
Brent II (with Jeremy Zucker)	Released: February 5, 2021 (US); Label: Republic; Formats: Digital download, streaming

=== Singles ===
==== As lead artist ====
List of singles as lead artist showing year released, chart positions, and album name
Title	Year	Peaks	Certifications	Album
Title	Year	US Pop	Certifications	Album
"Anything For You"	2015	—		Non-album single
"Wake Up"	2016	—		Non-album single
"Your Shirt"	2017	—	RIAA: Gold	Snow in October
"You Make Me"	2017	—		Snow in October
"Sixteen"	2017	—		Snow in October
"The Reason"	2018	—		Sleeping with Roses
"Cold Showers"	2018	—		Sleeping with Roses II
"You Were Good to Me" (with Jeremy Zucker)	2019	—	RIAA: Platinum; MC: Platinum	Brent
"Better Off" (with Jeremy Zucker)	2019	—	RIAA: Gold; MC: Gold	Brent
"Lucky" (featuring Alexander 23)	2019	—		How to Be Human
"How to Be Human"	2019	—		How to Be Human
"Sad Tonight"	2020	32		How to Be Human
"Crazier Things" (with Noah Kahan)	2020	—		Non-album singles
"Stay Next to Me" (with Quinn XCII)	2020	—	RIAA: Gold	Non-album singles
"This Is How You Fall in Love" (with Jeremy Zucker)	2021	—		Brent II
"Walking Away"	2021	—		When I Close My Eyes
"You Can Have It"	2021	—		When I Close My Eyes
"Calling All Angels" (with Quinn XCII)	2021	—		When I Close My Eyes
"Devil on My Shoulder"	2021	—		When I Close My Eyes
"The Lifeboat's Empty!"	2022	—		When I Close My Eyes (Deluxe)
"Walk Me Home" (with Said the Sky and Illenium)	2022	—		Sentiment
"Men on the Moon"	2022	—		Stellaria
"Stay Anything"	2023	—		Stellaria
"I Don't Feel Alive"	2023	—		Stellaria
"Your Bones"	2023	—		Stellaria
"Black & White" (with Jeremy Zucker)	2024	—		Brent III
"A-Frame" (with Jeremy Zucker)	2024	—		Brent III
"If I Could Just Stop The Time,"	2025	—		If I Could Just Stop The Time, (May 2024-May 2025)
"Bad"	2026	—		Is This the End?
"Sorry I'm Obsessed With You"	2026	—		Is This the End?
"What Else?"	2026	—		Is This the End?
"This Time Of The Year"	2026	—		Is This the End?
"—" denotes a recording that did not chart or was not released in that territory.

==== As featured artist ====
List of singles as featured artist showing year released, chart positions, and album name
Title	Year	Peaks					Certifications	Album
Title	Year	US Dance	AUS	NOR	SWE	SWI	Certifications	Album
"Flare Guns" (Quinn XCII featuring Chelsea Cutler)	2017	—	—	—	—	—	RIAA: Gold	The Story of Us
"Found You" (Kasbo featuring Chelsea Cutler)	2017	—	—	—	—	—		Non-album single
"Slow Down Love" (Louis the Child featuring Chelsea Cutler)	2017	42	—	—	—	—		Love Is Alive
"The Shine" (Ayokay with Chelsea Cutler)	2017	50	—	—	—	—		Non-album single
"Not OK" (Kygo with Chelsea Cutler)	2019	9	99	7	27	47		Golden Hour
"Little Things" (Louis the Child, Quinn XCII, Chelsea Cutler)	2020	—	—	—	—	—		Here for Now
"Crying Over You" (The Band Camino featuring Chelsea Cutler)	2020	—	—	—	—	—		Non-album single
"Let Me Down" (Quinn XCII featuring Chelsea Cutler)	2022	—	—	—	—	—		The People's Champ
"Starry Eyed" (Good Neighbours featuring Chelsea Cutler)	2025	—	—	—	—	—		Non-album single
"Nobody Should Have You" (Hayley Kiyoko featuring Chelsea Cutler)	2026	—	—	—	—	—		Girls Like Girls The Album
"—" denotes a recording that did not chart or was not released in that territory.

== Tours ==
=== Headlining ===
- Sleeping with Roses Tour (2018)
- Sleeping with Roses Tour, Part II (2019)
- How to Be Human Tour (2020)
- Stay Next to Me Tour [with Quinn XCII] (2021)
- When I Close My Eyes Tour (2022)
- When I Close My Eyes Tour II (2022)
- The Beauty Is Everywhere Tour (2024)

=== Livestream ===
- Brent: Live on the Internet (2021) (with Jeremy Zucker) [changes due COVID-19 pandemic]
- A Night at the Drive In: Live on the Internet (2021) (with Quinn XCII) [changes due COVID-19 pandemic]
