= Talk Too Much =

Single by Coin

from the album How Will You Know If You Never Try
- Released: May 5, 2016
- Genre: Indie pop; pop rock
- Length: 3:07
- Label: Columbia
- Songwriter(s): Chase Lawrence; Joe Memmel; Tim Pagnotta; Christopher J. Baran; Peter Thomas
- Producer(s): Tim Pagnotta

Coin singles chronology
| "Run" (2015) | "Talk Too Much" (2016) | "I Don't Wanna Dance" (2017) |

Music video
- "Talk Too Much" on YouTube

"Talk Too Much" is a song written and recorded by American pop rock band Coin, released as the lead single for their sophomore studio album, How Will You Know If You Never Try, by Columbia Records.

== Writing and composition ==
"Talk Too Much" was co-written by Chase Lawrence and Joe Memmel of the band, together with Tim Pagnotta, Christopher J Baran and Peter Thomas. The song was about Lawrence's inability to leave his thoughts unsaid, and was written in a few hours.

== Music video ==
The music video for the song was released on September 21, 2016.

== Chart performance ==
"Talk Too Much" is Coin's first hit that debuted on two US category charts, peaking at No. 8 on the Alternative Songs chart and No. 28 on the Hot Rock Songs chart.

=== Charts ===
| Chart (2016–17) | Peak position |
|---|---|
| Canada Rock (Billboard) | 38 |
| US Hot Rock & Alternative Songs (Billboard) | 28 |
| US Rock & Alternative Airplay (Billboard) | 16 |

== Certifications ==
| Region | Certification | Certified units/sales |
|---|---|---|
| United States (RIAA) | Gold | 500,000^{‡} |
^{‡} Sales+streaming figures based on certification alone.
