= Comethru =

- Cover artwork for the remix.

Single by Jeremy Zucker

from the album Summer, and Love Is Not Dying
- Language: English
- Released: September 28, 2018
- Genre: Indie pop
- Length: 3:01
- Label: Republic
- Songwriters: Jeremy Zucker; Daniel Rakow
- Producer: Jeremy Zucker

Jeremy Zucker singles chronology
"All the Kids Are Depressed" (2018)	"Comethru" (2018)	"You Were Good to Me" (2019)

Music video
- "Comethru" on YouTube

"Comethru" (stylized in lowercase) is a song recorded by American singer Jeremy Zucker. The song was released on September 28, 2018.

== Personnel ==
Credits adapted from Apple Music.

Musicians

- Jeremy Zucker – Vocals, Programming, Guitar

Technical

- Jeremy Zucker – Songwriter, Producer
- Daniel Rakow – Songwriter
- Andrew Maury – Mixing Engineer
- Joe LaPorta – Mastering Engineer
- Dale Becker – Mastering Engineer
- Harry Burr – Assistant Mixing Engineer
- Jeff Ellis – Mixing Engineer

== Charts ==
Chart performance for "Comethru"
Chart (2020)	Peak position
South Korea (Gaon Digital Chart)	59

== Certifications ==
Certifications for "Comethru"
Region	Certification	Certified units/sales
Australia (ARIA)	2× Platinum	140,000^{‡}
Brazil (Pro-Música Brasil)	2× Platinum	80,000^{‡}
Canada (Music Canada)	3× Platinum	240,000^{‡}
New Zealand (RMNZ)	Platinum	30,000^{‡}
Norway (IFPI Norway)	Gold	30,000^{‡}
Portugal (AFP)	Platinum	10,000^{‡}
United Kingdom (BPI)	Silver	200,000^{‡}
United States (RIAA)	2× Platinum	2,000,000^{‡}
Streaming
South Korea (KMCA)	Platinum	100,000,000^{†}
^{‡} Sales+streaming figures based on certification alone.^{†} Streaming-only figures based on certification alone.
