= The People's Champ (Quinn XCII album) =

Studio album by Quinn XCII
- Released: January 27, 2023
- Genre: Pop
- Length: 33:16
- Label: Republic

Quinn XCII chronology
Change of Scenery II (2021)	The People's Champ (2023)	Breakfast (2024)

Singles from The People's Champ
- 1. "Backpack" Released: August 5, 2022; 2. "Common" Released: September 23, 2022; 3. "Let Me Down" Released: December 2, 2022; 4. "The Lows" Released: January 13, 2023; 5. "Georgia Peach" Released: May 12, 2023

The People's Champ is the fifth studio album by American singer-songwriter Quinn XCII. It was released through Republic Records on January 27, 2023, featuring guest appearances from Big Sean, Chelsea Cutler, Adrian Cota, and AJR.

The People's Champ ratings
Review scores
Source	Rating
Beyond the Stage	6/10 stars
Indiana Daily Student	(negative)

== Track listing ==
The People's Champ track listing
No.	Title	Writer(s)	Length
1.	"Bartender"	Mikael Temrowski; Adam Friedman	2:56
2.	"Common" (featuring Big Sean)	Temrowski; David Wilson; Jake Torrey; Jesse Blum; Sean Anderson	2:39
3.	"Black Porsche"	Temrowski; Friedman; Zeke Sacaridiz	3:06
4.	"FOMO (Don't Do Cool Shit)"	Temrowski; David Barnes; Marc Scibilia	2:37
5.	"Let Me Down" (featuring Chelsea Cutler)	Temrowski; Cutler; Alexander O'Neill; Thomas Michel	2:29
6.	"Good Either Way" (featuring Adrian Cota)	Temrowski; Cota; Friedman; Noah Conrad	2:41
7.	"Too Late" (featuring AJR)	Temrowski; Jack Met; Ryan Met; Michel	2:55
8.	"The Lows"	Temrowski; Oliver Feighan; Phil Cook	2:50
9.	"Being Me"	Temrowski; David Hodges; Whakaio Taahi	2:14
10.	"Why Do You Talk To Me?"	Temrowski; Michel; Jesse Fink; Michael McCall; Pat McManus	2:53
11.	"Backpack"	Temrowski; Fink; Brandon Shoop; Remy Gautreau	2:57
12.	"All That You Need"	Temrowski; O'Neill; Michel	2:54
Total length:			33:16

Extended version deluxe track
No.	Title	Writer(s)	Length
1.	"Georgia Peach"	Temrowski; Friedman	2:21
Total length:			35:38

== Charts ==
Weekly chart performance for The People's Champ
Chart (2023)	Peak position
US Billboard 200	180
