= Lim Jae-hyun =

South Korean singer

- Born: October 21, 1997 (age 27)
- Origin: South Korea
- Occupation: Singer
- Years active: 2017–present

Korean name
- Hangul: 임재현
- RR: Im Jaehyeon
- MR: Im Chaehyŏn

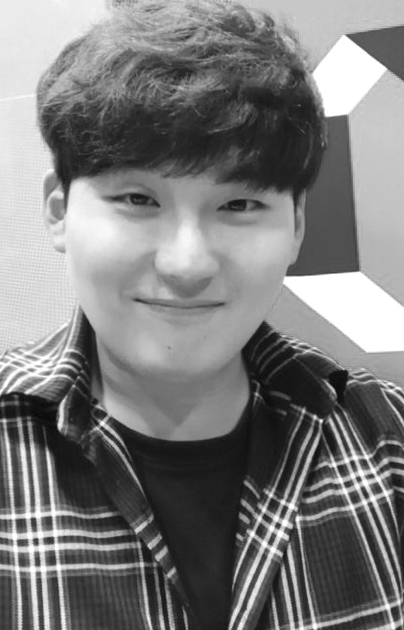

Lim Jae-hyun (Korean: 임재현; born 1997) is a South Korean singer. He debuted in 2017 and rose to fame in 2019 with his song "If There Was Practice in Love", which reached number one on South Korea's Circle Digital Chart. He topped the chart again in 2024 with "Rhapsody of Sadness", a remake of Choi Jae-hoon's song from 2000.

== Discography ==
=== Singles ===
Title	Year	Peak chart positions	Certifications
Title	Year	KOR	Certifications
"With a Smile" (웃으며) (with Moon Seong-wook)	2018	181	
"If There Was Practice in Love" (사랑에 연습이 있었다면)	2018	1	KMCA: 2× Platinum (st.)
"Please Come Back" (내가 나빴어)	2018	—	
"I'm a Little Drunk" (조금 취했어)	2019	4	KMCA: Platinum (st.)
"Fancy Clothes" (비싼옷)	2020	149	
"From Dawn" (밤) (with Moon Seong-wook)	2020	200	
"Framed" (누명)	2020	—	
"I Can Only See You" (너밖에 안보여)	2021	121	
"I'd Love You Again if I Have a Next Life" (다음생이 있다면 당신을 만나서 다시 사랑할래요)	2021	76	
"Drunken Confession at Night" (고백하는 취한밤에)	2022	39	
"Season That Doesn't Exist" (세상에 없는 계절)	2023	99	
"Bad Boy" (나쁜놈)	2023	—	
"Rhapsody of Sadness" (비의 랩소디)	2023	1	
"Half of My Life" (내 삶의 반)	2025	119	
"Love Sick" (중독된 사랑)	2025	157	
"—" denotes a release that did not chart.

=== Soundtrack appearances ===
Title	Year	Peak chart positions	Album
Title	Year	KOR	Album
"Inferno" (with Asteria)	2017	—	Closers OST
"I Think It's An Anesthetic" (마취가 됐나봐)	2018	—	A Pledge to God OST
"My Only One" (하나뿐인 내편)	2018	—	My Only One OST
"Heaven (2023)"	2023	19	It Was Spring OST
"Floral Shoes" (꽃신)	2023	—	My Dearest OST
"I Think It's Love" (사랑인가봄) (feat. Skinny Brown)	2024	—	Reunion Counseling OST
"—" denotes a release that did not chart.

== Awards and nominations ==
Award	Year	Category	Nominated work	Result	Ref.
Circle Chart Music Awards	2019	Popular Singer of the Year	"If There Was Practice in Love"	Won	
Circle Chart Music Awards	2022	Artist of the Year - Digital Music (November)	"I'd Love You Again if I Have a Next Life"	Nominated	
MAMA Awards	2023	Best OST	"Heaven (2023)"	Nominated	
Melon Music Awards	2023	Best OST	"Heaven (2023)"	Won	
