= BabyJake =

American singer-songwriter (born 1997)

- Born: Jacob Paul Herring; March 6, 1997 (age 29); Key West, Florida, U.S.
- Genres: Pop; country pop; pop rap; pop rock
- Occupations: Singer; songwriter; rapper; guitarist
- Labels: Alter Music; Republic Records; Universal Music Enterprises; SB Projects; Transcendent Entertainment
- Website: itsbabyjake.com

Jacob Paul Herring (born March 6, 1997), known professionally as BabyJake, is an American singer, songwriter, and rapper. He was born in Key West, Florida and grew up in Fort Myers, where he discovered his love for music and learned to play the guitar at age eight.

Herring rose to prominence in 2019 after signing to Scooter Braun's SB Projects, a partner of Republic Records. Also in 2019, Herring released his debut major label single "Cigarettes on Patios", whose remix included a performance by rapper 24kGoldn.

Herring released his debut studio album, The Sun Wakes Up Earlier Now, on September 3, 2021. His sophomore album, a rock and roll album titled Aren’t We Ever Gonna Be More Than Friends?, was released on July 28, 2023. It was followed by an acoustic album, Rude, Crude, and Uncouth on December 15, 2023. In addition, he has released three extended plays.

== Early life ==
Jake Herring was born on March 6, 1997, in Key West and lived in Fort Myers. After picking up guitar at eight, by age fourteen, he was writing original songs. Starting a career under his birth name; he later switched to using the name BabyJake after signing to Republic Records. His earliest musical influences were Crosby, Stills & Nash, Jackson Browne, and John Mayer.

== Career ==
=== 2019-2021: "Cigarettes on Patios" and Don’t Give Me Problems, Give Me Wine ===
Herring gained popularity after releasing the single "Cigarettes on Patios" on June 7, 2019. The track went viral on TikTok. As of 2023, the song has over 139 million streams. He released his debut extended play Don't Give Me Problems, Give Me Wine on July 31, 2020.

=== 2021-2022: The Sun Wakes Up Earlier Now ===
Herring's debut album The Sun Wakes Up Earlier Now was released on September 3, 2021, supported by the singles "Do I Fit In Your Shoes?", "Funny Thing About Love", "Daddy's Coming Home", and "Watching". The album was recorded over the COVID-19 pandemic from early 2020 to late 2021. It was pressed on vinyl, and sold at major retail outlets including Urban Outfitters, which carried an exclusive opaque red LP.

His second EP First Stop was released on November 5 and his third EP Second Base came out on November 19. The two projects contained no original music; they are compilations of Herring's favorite songs from his first EP and debut album.

=== 2022-present: Departure from major label and independent albums ===
After departing from Republic Records, Herring released five singles in early 2023, all of which appear on his upcoming second studio album. The first, a cover of "Beast of Burden" by The Rolling Stones, was released on February 17, 2023. It was closely followed by a second single titled "We Got to Get Together to Be Free", released on March 24. The third song, "Gambler's Prayer" was released on May 5. The fourth, "Cry Cry Cry", was released on June 9, and the fifth, a psychedelic song "Brown", was released on July 14.

His second album, Aren't We Ever Gonna Be More Than Friends?, a rock and roll-inspired album, was released on July 28, 2023. On the evening of July 27, the day before it was released, BabyJake hosted a livestream on Instagram Live in which he played five tracks from the album and revealed that he had more music in progress, including an entirely acoustic album which would be released later the same year.

On September 22, 2023, the album's first single "Sweetheart from Arkansas" was released; a new song from the album was released every Friday leading up to the album's release. Along with the final track "Year 25", the album, called Rude, Crude, and Uncouth, was released on December 15, 2023. On May 31, 2024, a piano-backed rock song called "Bottom of a Dirty Shoe" came out as the first single from his upcoming fourth studio album and next was "Arian(e)" on July 6.

== Personal life ==
Herring has admitted to having been addicted to cocaine as a young adult and he has since quit doing drugs. He lives in Nashville.

== Discography ==
=== Studio albums ===
Album	Album details
The Sun Wakes Up Earlier Now	Released: September 3, 2021; Label: Republic Records; Formats: Digital download, streaming, LP
Aren’t We Ever Gonna Be More Than Friends?	Released: July 28, 2023; Label: Self-released; Formats: Digital download, streaming
Rude, Crude, and Uncouth	Released: December 15, 2023; Label: Self-released; Formats: Digital download, streaming
Beautiful Blue Collar Boy	Released: September 13, 2024; Label: Alter Music; Formats: Digital download, streaming

=== Demo albums ===
Album	Album details
Demos That Never Made It Pt. 1	Released: January 24, 2024; Label: Self-released; Formats: Digital download, streaming

=== Extended plays ===
Album	Album details
Don't Give Me Problems, Give Me Wine	Released: July 31, 2020; Label: Republic Records; Formats: Digital download, streaming
First Stop	Released: November 5, 2021; Label: Universal Music Enterprises; Formats: Digital download, streaming
Second Base	Released: November 19, 2021; Label: UME; Formats: Digital download, streaming
