= Quinn XCII =

American singer-songwriter

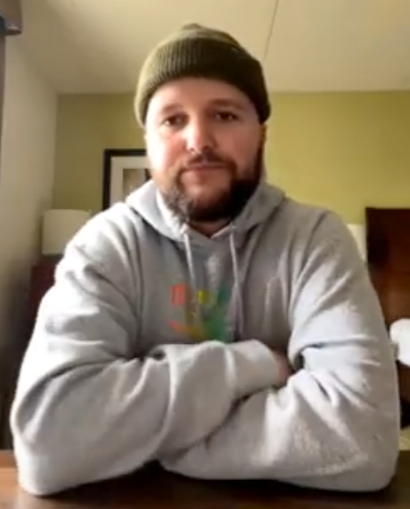
- Quinn XCII in 2023
- Born: Mikael Temrowski; May 6, 1992 (age 34); Grosse Pointe, Michigan, U.S.
- Other name: Mustard Mike
- Occupations: Singer; songwriter
- Years active: 2011–present
- Musical career
- Genres: Pop; hip hop; reggae; EDM
- Instruments: Vocals
- Labels: Republic Records; Columbia Records; AWAL
- Website: quinnxcii.com

Mikael Temrowski (born May 6, 1992), known by his stage name Quinn XCII (pronounced "Quinn ninety-two"), is an American singer-songwriter from Grosse Pointe, Michigan. He began his career in 2011 when he started writing and recording his own music as a sophomore at Michigan State University, before releasing his debut EP Change of Scenery in May 2015. On September 15, 2017, he released his debut studio album The Story of Us under Columbia Records, with whom he released his second, third, and fourth albums, all in the following four years.

After signing to Republic Records, he released his fifth studio album The People's Champ in 2023 followed by three meal-themed EPs culminating in his sixth album Quinn XCII Presents Mustard Mike's Breakfast, Lunch, and Dinner, released in December 2024. In May 2025, he announced his seventh album, Look! I’m Alive, which was released on July 25, 2025.

== Early life ==
Mikael Temrowski was born on May 6, 1992 in Grosse Pointe, Michigan. He grew up listening to Motown music. He met his primary producer and friend Ayokay in third grade of elementary school and they remained close throughout high school. Temrowski began attending college at Michigan State University in East Lansing where he took an interest in writing and recording music as a sophomore.

== Career ==
=== 2011–2016: Early career and EPs ===
Temrowski originally went by the stage name "Mike T" and started performing and uploading videos to YouTube. In college, he adopted the name Quinn based on an acronym used by a professor: "Quit Unless Your Instincts Are Never Neglected." Because of trademark issues, he later added the Roman numerals for 92, the two-digit abbreviation for 1992, the year he was born.

Quinn XCII rapped over beats sampled from popular songs until 2011, when he released his own original song, "They Know", and his first extended play Old Fashioned, on November 5, 2012. During his attendance at Michigan State University, sometime around 2014, Temrowski began being serious about writing and recording music. He and his longtime friend and producer (Ayokay) began producing music together, with Quinn XCII rapping over beats Ayokay found on YouTube. Quinn XCII quickly became a college mixtape sensation, and he traveled frequently to Ann Arbor, Michigan to record new music with Ayokay.

During May 2015, Quinn XCII released his debut extended play entitled Change of Scenery, which received millions of online streams. His next single, "Stung", climbed to the #1 position on Hype Machine's Popular Charts. In January 2016, Quinn XCII was featured on Ayokay's own single entitled "Kings of Summer", which went to #1 on the Spotify Global Viral Chart. It stayed there for three consecutive weeks, in addition to having 25 million streams on Spotify. His collaboration with producer Illenium on a track entitled "With You" reached #1 on the HypeMachine Popular Chart and reached #20 on the Spotify Global Viral Chart.

On March 10, 2016, Quinn XCII released his highly anticipated second EP titled Bloom. Shortly after releasing the EP, Quinn XCII went on his first nationwide tour performing in 24 cities for over 20,000 fans.

=== 2016–2018: The Story of Us ===
On December 9, 2016, Quinn XCII released his new single "Straightjacket", taken off of his upcoming debut album The Story of Us. A non-album single was released titled "Make Time", succeeded by two singles from the album that were released preceding the album's release in 2017, "Fake Denim" and "Worst". The Story of Us came out on September 15, 2017, under Columbia Records. A deluxe edition of the album was released on February 16, 2018, supported by the new single "Iron & Steel".

In April 2018, it was announced that Quinn XCII was added to the management roster of Visionary Music Group through a partnership with his manager Jesse Coren.

=== 2018–2020: From Michigan with Love ===
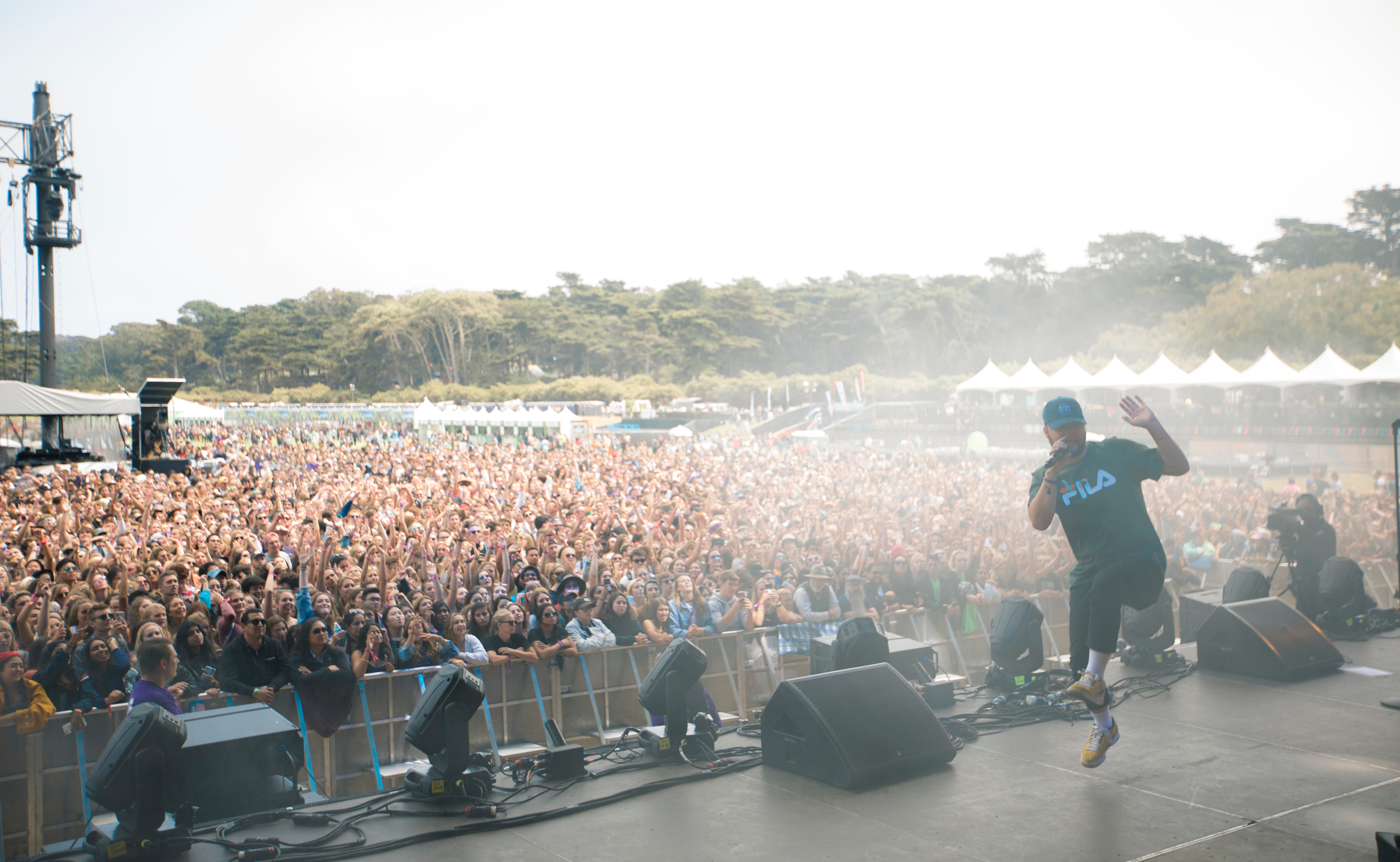
Quinn XCII performing at Outside Lands in San Francisco, 2018

Quinn XCII released his first single since A Story of Us titled "Panama" on August 22, 2018, on the music-sharing website SoundCloud and on all platforms on August 29. He wrote the song in honor of his four late grandparents. On October 23, 2018, Quinn XCII announced a new upcoming single titled "Werewolf" featuring Yoshi Flower, and was released two days later on October 25. A week later, he released another single "Sad Still" on November 1, centered around the struggles and feelings of dealing with anxiety. He soon announced his second album titled From Michigan with Love via social media on November 5, 2018, which contains the latter two singles. The album was teased for an early 2019 release date. On December 11, 2018, Quinn XCII announced the third single off the album, titled "Tough" featuring Noah Kahan, and it came out on December 14.

On November 6, 2018, Quinn XCII announced his worldwide 2019 tour for From Michigan with Love, titled "From Tour with Love". The tour had stops in eight European cities and then 30 cities in North America with Christian French and Ashe co-headlining the tour. The tour debuted in Amsterdam on February 3, and the North American leg started on February 19 in Indianapolis, Indiana and ends on April 17 in Austin, Texas.

Quinn XCII announced via social media on January 7, 2019, that From Michigan with Love is set to be released on February 15. On February 15, it was released with 12 songs.

Quinn XCII teased his new single "Stacy" on June 18, 2019, on Twitter. The single was released that week on June 21, 2019.

=== 2020: A Letter to My Younger Self ===
On January 10, 2020, he released a single titled "Two 10s". On April 27, 2020, Quinn XCII announced his third studio album A Letter to My Younger Self, inspired by a lifetime of events and experiences. It was released on July 10, 2020. On April 28, 2020, he teased his new single titled "Coffee" with Marc E. Bassy which was released on Friday, May 1, 2020.

=== 2021: Change of Scenery II ===
Quinn XCII released his fourth studio album on March 5, 2021. Abandoning his residence in Los Angeles, the album was produced at Ayokay's family home in Rhode Island. He released two singles ahead of the release, "Stay Next to Me (with Chelsea Cutler)" and "My Wife & 2 Dogs"

=== 2023-present: The People's Champ, Mustard Mike's & Look! I’m Alive ===
On January 27, 2023, Quinn XCII released his fifth studio album, entitled The People's Champ, via a deal with Republic Records. The album was supported by four singles ahead of the release, "Backpack", "Common (featuring Big Sean)", "Let Me Down (with Chelsea Cutler), and "The Lows".

Next to come out were three meal-themed EPs culminating in his sixth album ''Quinn XCII Presents Mustard Mike's Breakfast, Lunch, and Dinner'', released on December 6th 2024. On May 2nd 2025, Quinn XCII released "Olive Tree" a single from the now titled "LOOK! I'm Alive" album which was announced on May 7th 2025 as his 7th studio album which is set be released on July 25th 2025

== Style ==
Quinn XCII has been known to blend several different genres of music including hip-hop, pop, reggae, rock, electronic and soul. His early music had him focused more on rapping than singing. He has listed Kid Cudi, Kanye West, Mos Def, Jack Johnson, Jon Bellion, Michael Jackson, Sam Cooke, and Chance the Rapper as artists who have influenced him.

== Discography ==
=== Studio albums ===
Title	Album details	Peak chart positions
Title	Album details	US
The Story of Us	Released: September 17, 2017; Label: Columbia Records; Format: CD, LP, digital download, streaming	—
From Michigan with Love	Released: February 15, 2019; Label: Columbia; Format: Digital download, streaming	90
A Letter to My Younger Self	Released: July 10, 2020; Label: Columbia; Format: Digital download, streaming	56
Change of Scenery II	Released: March 5, 2021; Label: Columbia; Format: Digital download, streaming	69
The People's Champ	Released: January 27, 2023; Label: Republic Records; Format: CD, digital download, streaming	180
Quinn XCII Presents Mustard Mike's Breakfast, Lunch, and Dinner	Released: December 6, 2024; Label: AWAL; Format: Digital download, streaming	—
Look! I’m Alive	Released: July 25, 2025; Label: AWAL; Format: Digital download, streaming	—

- Extended plays

Title	EP details
Old Fashioned (as Mike T)	Released: November 5, 2012; Label: Self-released; Format: Digital download, streaming
Shlup	Released: August 11, 2013; Label: Self-released; Format: Digital download, streaming
Change of Scenery	Released: April 28, 2015; Label: Self-released; Format: Digital download, streaming
Bloom	Released: March 9, 2016; Label: Self-released; Format: Digital download, streaming
Breakfast	Released: May 3, 2024; Label: AWAL; Format: Digital download, streaming
Lunch	Released: September 20, 2024; Label: AWAL; Format: Digital download, streaming
Dinner	Released: December 6, 2024; Label: AWAL; Format: Digital download, streaming
Bull in a China Shop	Released: August 10, 2026; Label: AWAL; Format: Digital download, streaming

=== Singles ===
==== As lead artist ====
Title	Year	Certifications	Album
"Full Circle"	2015		Non-album singles
"Stung"	2015		Non-album singles
"Good Friend"	2015		Bloom
"Straightjacket"	2016	RIAA: Platinum; RMNZ: Gold	The Story of Us
"Make Time"	2017		Non-album single
"Fake Denim"	2017		The Story of Us
"Worst"	2017		The Story of Us
"Always Been You"	2017	RIAA: Gold	The Story of Us
"Iron & Steel"	2018		The Story of Us (Deluxe Version)
"Panama"	2018		Non-album single
"Werewolf" (with Yoshi Flower)	2018		From Michigan with Love
"Sad Still"	2018		From Michigan with Love
"Tough" (with Noah Kahan)	2018		From Michigan with Love
"Life Must Go On" (with Jon Bellion)	2019		From Michigan with Love
"Stacy"	2019	RIAA: Gold; MC: Gold	A Letter to My Younger Self
"Two 10s"	2020		A Letter to My Younger Self
"Coffee" (with Marc E. Bassy)	2020		A Letter to My Younger Self
"A Letter to My Younger Self" (featuring Logic)	2020		A Letter to My Younger Self
"Stay Next to Me" (with Chelsea Cutler)	2020	RIAA: Gold	Change of Scenery II
"Backpack"	2022		The People's Champ
"Common" (with Big Sean)	2022		The People's Champ
"Let Me Down" (with Chelsea Cutler)	2022		The People's Champ
"The Lows"	2023		The People's Champ
"Pasadena"	2024		Quinn XCII Presents Mustard Mike's Breakfast, Lunch, and Dinner
"Close Calls"	2024		Quinn XCII Presents Mustard Mike's Breakfast, Lunch, and Dinner
"Melt"	2024		Quinn XCII Presents Mustard Mike's Breakfast, Lunch, and Dinner
"Unconditional"	2024		Quinn XCII Presents Mustard Mike's Breakfast, Lunch, and Dinner
"Olive Tree"	2025		Look! I’m Alive

==== As featured artist ====
List of singles as featured artist, with selected chart positions
Title	Year	Peak chart positions		Certifications	Album
Title	Year	US Bub.	US Dance Elec.	Certifications	Album
"100 Degrees" (KOLAJ featuring Quinn XCII)	2016	—	—		Non-album singles
"Sweet Talk" (Academy featuring Quinn XCII)	2016	—	—		Non-album singles
"Something from Nothing" (GRMM featuring Quinn XCII)	2016	—	—		Scenes
"Kings of Summer" (Ayokay featuring Quinn XCII)	2016	—	18	RIAA: Platinum	4ft to Infinity
"Space" (Prince Fox featuring Quinn XCII)	2017	—	—		All This Music, Vol. 1
"Winnebago" (Gryffin featuring Quinn XCII & Daniel Wilson)	2018	—	38		Non-album singles
"Middle Finger" (Phoebe Ryan featuring Quinn XCII)	2018	—	—		Non-album singles
"The City" (Louis the Child with Quinn XCII)	2018	—	24		Kids at Play
"Alive" (YOG$ with Quinn XCII)	2018	—	—		Universe From Here
"Love Me Less" (MAX featuring Quinn XCII)	2019	1	—	RIAA: Gold; MC: Platinum; RMNZ: Gold	Colour Vision
"Little Things" (Louis the Child featuring Chelsea Cutler and Quinn XCII)	2020	—	14		Here for Now
"West Coast" (Dvbbs featuring Quinn XCII)	2020	—	—	MC: Gold	Non-album singles
"Daddy" (Tiny Meat Gang featuring Quinn XCII)	2021	—	—		Non-album singles
"Smile" (Dvbbs and Cash Cash featuring Quinn XCII)	2024	—	—		Non-album singles

=== Other charted and certified songs ===
List of singles as lead artist, with certifications
Title	Year	Certifications	Album
"Another Day in Paradise"	2015	RIAA: Gold	Change of Scenery
"Flare Guns" (featuring Chelsea Cutler)	2017	RIAA: Gold	The Story of Us

=== Guest appearances ===
Title	Year	Album
"You Should Get to Know Me" (Jeremy Zucker featuring Quinn XCII)	2015	Breathe
"With You" (Illenium featuring Quinn XCII)	2016	Ashes
"One in the Same" (Ayokay featuring Quinn XCII)	2016	4ft to Infinity
"Giving Up Ground" (Chelsea Cutler featuring Quinn XCII)	2017	Snow In October
"Queen" (Ayokay featuring Quinn XCII)	2018	In the Shape of a Dream

== Awards and nominations ==
Year	Nominee / work	Award	Result	Ref.
2020	From Michigan, With Love	Detroit Music Award for Outstanding Major Label Recording	Nominated	
