= Kids in Love (album) =

Studio album by Kygo
- Released: 3 November 2017
- Recorded: 2016–2017
- Genre: Tropical house
- Length: 43:55
- Label: Sony Music Sweden; RCA; Ultra
- Producer: Kygo; Oliver Nelson

Kygo chronology
Stargazing (2017)	Kids in Love (2017)	Golden Hour (2020)

Singles from Kids in Love
- 1. "Kids in Love" Released: 20 October 2017; 2. "Stranger Things" Released: 24 January 2018; 3. "Remind Me to Forget" Released: 16 March 2018

Kids in Love is the second studio album by the Norwegian DJ and record producer Kygo, featuring John Newman, Jason Walker, Oliver Nelson, Bonnie McKee, OneRepublic, Wrabel, The Night Game, James Abrahart and Billy Raffoul. It was released by Sony Music and Ultra Music on 3 November 2017. The album's lead single and title track, "Kids in Love", was released on 20 October 2017.

== Background and promotion ==
In a video that Kygo posted on social media on 19 October 2017, he announced that Kids in Love would be the title of his second studio album and revealed its release date. He talked about the inspiration behind the album's title, saying, "Being a kid in love is that concept of being super-passionate about someone or something, and I've been super-passionate about playing the piano since I was 6 years old, whenever I make a song or melody that I really like, I feel like a kid in love." After releasing the lead single "Kids in Love", Kygo started releasing songs as promotional singles from the album every day starting on 27 October 2017. He announced the Kids in Love tour on 30 November 2017, with Gryffin, Blackbear and Seeb as special guests. Kygo told Billboard in an interview that the album was inspired by Michael Jackson, Foo Fighters, Red Hot Chili Peppers, Avicii and Bon Iver. He told Las Vegas Weekly that he was trying to "find sounds from more unknown people that have great ideas" and making recognizable music.

== Critical reception ==
Professional ratings
Review scores
Source	Rating
AllMusic	4/5 stars
Substream Magazine	3/5 stars

David Rishty of Billboard was positive towards the album, writing that it "mixes a multitude of genres, but manages to encompass a cohesive body of work, which radiates with Kygo's signature sound". Neil Z. Yeung from AllMusic described the album as feeling "more like an EP" due to its short run time, but praised Kygo for taking "stylistic steps outside his comfort zone" which "avoids much of the homogeneity" of his previous "overstuffed" Cloud Nine album. He closed the review by writing that the record "brims with feeling and maintains its momentum throughout, providing an extremely uplifting and empowering mix". Mark Mancino of The Nocturnal Times wrote that Kids in Love "presents a matured evolution of the signature tropical sound he's become most known for creating", and dubbed "Permanent" one of his favourite tracks of 2017, because of its "powerfully-effective lyric and euphoric melodies".

James Shotwell of Substream Magazine criticized the album for its lack of originality and "great emotional impact". He concluded by deeming it "a perfectly enjoyable, largely forgettable release that will help extend the playlists of electronic music fans without altogether turning off any longtime Kygo listeners". Ollie Webber of The Edge similarly noted how, despite the presence of some standout tracks, some songs felt "bland and forgettable" and that the album as a whole "fail[ed] to deliver on the emotional potential of its title".

== Track listing ==
All music is composed by Kygo.

Kids in Love track listing
No.	Title	Lyrics	Music	Producer(s)	Length
1.	"Never Let You Go" (featuring John Newman)	Newman	Newman	Kygo	3:52
2.	"Sunrise" (featuring Jason Walker)	Walker; David Frank; Petey Martin	Walker; Frank; Martin	Kygo	3:34
3.	"Riding Shotgun" (with Oliver Nelson featuring Bonnie McKee)	McKee; Jessie Malakouti	Nelson; McKee; Malakouti	Kygo; Nelson	3:18
4.	"Stranger Things" (featuring OneRepublic)	Ryan Tedder	Tedder; Casey Smith	Kygo	3:41
5.	"With You" (featuring Wrabel)	Stephen Wrabel; Erik Hassle	Wrabel; Hassle; Drew Pearson	Kygo	3:30
6.	"Kids in Love" (featuring The Night Game)	Linda Karlsson; Sonny Gustafsson; Martin Johnson; Kyle Puccia	Karlsson; Johnson; Gustafsson; Pete Townshend	Kygo	4:23
7.	"Permanent" (featuring JHart)	James Abrahart	Abrahart; Johnny Price	Kygo	3:48
8.	"I See You" (featuring Billy Raffoul)	Raffoul; Morten Pilegaard; Jaramye Daniels	Raffoul; Pilegaard; Daniels	Kygo	3:48
9.	"Stargazing" (featuring Justin Jesso)	Jesso	Kygo; Jamie Hartman; Stuart Crichton	Kygo; Crichton; Hartman	3:45
10.	"It Ain't Me" (with Selena Gomez)	Gomez; Brian Lee; Ali Tamposi	Kygo; Andrew Watt	Kygo; Watt	3:40
11.	"First Time" (with Ellie Goulding)	Goulding; Fanny Hultman; Jenson Vaugn; Sara Hjellström	Kygo; Alexsej Vlasenko; Jonas Kalisch; Jeremy Chacon; Henrik Meinke	Kygo; Hitimpulse	3:14
12.	"This Town" (featuring Sasha Sloan)	Sloan; Noonie Bao	Sloan; Bao	Kygo; Sloan	3:22
Total length:					43:55

Kids in Love – re-release
No.	Title	Lyrics	Music	Producer(s)	Length
13.	"Remind Me to Forget" (featuring Miguel)	David Phelan; Alex Oriet; Phil Plested	Phelan; Oriet; Plested	Kygo	3:37
Total length:					49:32

Kids in Love – remixes
No.	Title	Length
1.	"This Town" (featuring Sasha Sloan and Gucci Mane) (Gucci Mane edit)	3:22
2.	"Never Let You Go" (featuring John Newman) (Jack Wins remix)	3:29
3.	"Never Let You Go" (featuring John Newman) (acoustic version)	3:59
4.	"Riding Shotgun" (with Oliver Nelson featuring Bonnie McKee) (Ryan Riback remix)	3:32
5.	"Stranger Things" (featuring OneRepublic) (Alan Walker remix)	2:58
6.	"Kids in Love" (featuring The Night Game) (The Him remix)	3:15
7.	"Kids in Love" (featuring The Night Game) (Alok remix)	4:09
8.	"Kids in Love" (featuring The Night Game) (acoustic version)	4:05
9.	"Permanent" (featuring J.Hart) (Sam Feldt remix)	3:30
Total length:		32:19

Japanese Edition of album includes standard track list plus 2 bonus remixes 13 Kygo– It Ain't Me (Tiësto's AFTR:HRS Remix) Featuring – Selena Gomez Remix – Tiësto* 3:11 14 Kygo– First Time (R3hab Remix) Featuring – Ellie Goulding Remix – R3hab 2:36

== Charts ==
=== Weekly charts ===
Chart (2017–2018)	Peak position
Australian Albums (ARIA)	42
Belgian Albums (Ultratop Flanders)	68
Belgian Albums (Ultratop Wallonia)	68
Canadian Albums (Billboard)	25
Dutch Albums (Album Top 100)	22
Finnish Albums (Suomen virallinen lista)	14
French Albums (SNEP)	69
German Albums (Offizielle Top 100)	91
Irish Albums (IRMA)	27
Italian Albums (FIMI)	76
Japanese Albums (Oricon)	51
Latvian Albums (LaIPA)	13
New Zealand Albums (RMNZ)	39
Norwegian Albums (VG-lista)	3
Scottish Albums (Official Charts)	87
South Korean Albums (Gaon)	95
Spanish Albums (Promusicae)	87
Swedish Albums (Sverigetopplistan)	3
Swiss Albums (Schweizer Hitparade)	34
UK Albums (Official Charts)	35
US Billboard 200	73
US Top Dance Albums (Billboard)	1

=== Year-end charts ===
Chart (2018)	Position
French Albums (SNEP)	107
Swedish Albums (Sverigetopplistan)	11
US Top Dance/Electronic Albums (Billboard)	6

Chart (2019)	Position
US Top Dance/Electronic Albums (Billboard)	23

== Certifications ==
Region	Certification	Certified units/sales
Canada (Music Canada)	Gold	40,000^{‡}
France (SNEP)	Platinum	100,000^{‡}
Netherlands (NVPI)	Platinum	40,000^{‡}
New Zealand (RMNZ)	Gold	7,500^{‡}
Poland (ZPAV)	Platinum	20,000^{‡}
Switzerland (IFPI Switzerland)	Platinum	20,000^{‡}
United Kingdom (BPI)	Gold	100,000^{‡}
^{‡} Sales+streaming figures based on certification alone.
