= Kids in Love =

Kids in Love may refer to:

- Kids in Love (film), a 2016 British film
- Kids in Love (album), a 2017 album by Kygo
  - "Kids in Love" (song), a song from the album
- Kids in Love, a 2015 album by The Mowgli's
- "Kids in Love", a song by Mayday Parade song from Anywhere but Here
- "Kids in Love", a song by Pink from Trustfall
