= Dancing Feet =

Dancing Feet may refer to:

- Dancing Feet (film), a 1936 American comedy film
- "Dancing Feet" (song), a song by Kygo featuring DNCE
- Dancing Feet (album), a 1987 album by The Tannahill Weavers
