= Stargazing (Kygo song) =

Single by Kygo featuring Justin Jesso

from the EP Stargazing
- Released: 22 September 2017
- Genre: Tropical house; progressive house
- Length: 3:56
- Label: Sony; Ultra
- Songwriters: Jamie Hartman; Stuart Crichton; Kygo; Justin Jesso
- Producers: Kygo; Jamie Hartman; Stuart Crichton

Kygo singles chronology
"First Time" (2017)	"Stargazing" (2017)	"Kids in Love" (2017)

Music video
- "Stargazing" on YouTube

"Stargazing" is a song by the Norwegian DJ and record producer Kygo. It features vocals of American singer Justin Jesso. The song was written by Kygo, Justin Jesso, Stuart Crichton and Jamie Hartman. The song was co-produced by Kygo, Stuart Crichton and Jamie Hartman.

Released on 22 September 2017 as the title track from Kygo's 2017 EP of the same name, it was the third single from the EP after "It Ain't Me" released on 17 February 2017 and "First Time" released on 28 April 2017. Kygo premiered the song in August 2017 during the Judgenfest festival in Norway.

== Music video ==
The music video was released on 26 September 2017 on Kygo's YouTube channel. It was directed by Philip R. Lopez. Described by Billboard as "emotional", the song shows a little boy making his own rocket in the quest of chasing his recently deceased father. The boy finds a note saying "You will always find me in the stars.- Love, Dad".

The boy theorizes that he could meet his dad in the stars so he took help of various people but he did not inform his mother as he was scared that his mission would be stopped.

As Justin Jesso's voice gets strong, the boy reaches his quest. But however his mom was informed about the boy's invention by one of the people that helped the boy. She was disappointed and feared to lose her son too, however the boy told her that he would always be in the stars. The mother cried and agreed to let her son accomplish his mission to chase his dad, so they release the rocket ship in the backyard with all the various people that helped the boy accompanying them.

It was then that the woman faced her fear and she is left lonely.

== Track listing ==
- Digital download – orchestral version
1. "Stargazing" (orchestral version) (featuring Justin Jesso and Bergen Philharmonic Orchestra) – 3:50
- Digital download – Kaskade remix
1. "Stargazing" (Kaskade remix) – 3:03

== Charts ==
=== Weekly charts ===
Weekly chart performance for "Stargazing"
Chart (2017–2018)	Peak position
Australia (ARIA)	40
Austria (Ö3 Austria Top 40)	18
Belgium (Ultratop 50 Flanders)	32
Belgium (Ultratop 50 Wallonia)	7
Canada Hot 100 (Billboard)	53
Czech Republic Airplay (ČNS IFPI)	11
Czech Republic Singles Digital (ČNS IFPI)	11
Denmark (Tracklisten)	31
France (SNEP)	33
Germany (GfK)	14
Hungary (Rádiós Top 40)	22
Hungary (Single Top 40)	23
Hungary (Stream Top 40)	10
Ireland (IRMA)	16
Italy (FIMI)	72
Latvia Streaming (LaIPA)	13
Lebanon (Lebanese Top 20)	18
Malaysia (RIM)	12
Netherlands (Dutch Top 40)	2
Netherlands (Mega Top 50)	13
Netherlands (Single Top 100)	12
Norway (VG-lista)	2
Philippines (Philippine Hot 100)	56
Poland Airplay (ZPAV)	18
Portugal (AFP)	31
Scottish Singles Sales (Official Charts)	50
Slovakia Singles Digital (ČNS IFPI)	11
Slovenia (SloTop50)	19
Spain (Promusicae)	60
Sweden (Sverigetopplistan)	8
Switzerland (Schweizer Hitparade)	9
UK Singles (Official Charts)	44
US Hot Dance/Electronic Songs (Billboard)	11

=== Year-end charts ===
2017 year-end chart performance for "Stargazing"
Chart (2017)	Position
Hungary (Stream Top 40)	53
Latvia Airplay (LaIPA)	86
Netherlands (Dutch Top 40)	37
Sweden (Sverigetopplistan)	80
US Hot Dance/Electronic Songs (Billboard)	64

2018 year-end chart performance for "Stargazing"
Chart (2018)	Position
Belgium (Ultratop Wallonia)	56
France (SNEP)	103
Hungary (Rádiós Top 40)	98
Netherlands (Dutch Top 40)	58
Sweden (Sverigetopplistan)	96
Switzerland (Schweizer Hitparade)	65
US Hot Dance/Electronic Songs (Billboard)	43

== Certifications ==
Certifications for "Stargazing"
Region	Certification	Certified units/sales
Austria (IFPI Austria)	Platinum	30,000^{‡}
Belgium (BRMA)	Gold	10,000^{‡}
Canada (Music Canada)	2× Platinum	160,000^{‡}
Denmark (IFPI Danmark)	Platinum	90,000^{‡}
France (SNEP)	Platinum	133,333^{‡}
Germany (BVMI)	Platinum	400,000^{‡}
Italy (FIMI)	Platinum	50,000^{‡}
Mexico (AMPROFON)	Platinum+Gold	90,000^{‡}
New Zealand (RMNZ)	Platinum	30,000^{‡}
Poland (ZPAV)	Platinum	20,000^{‡}
Spain (Promusicae)	Gold	20,000^{‡}
Sweden (GLF)	2× Platinum	80,000^{‡}
Switzerland (IFPI Switzerland)	2× Platinum	40,000^{‡}
United Kingdom (BPI)	Gold	400,000^{‡}
United States (RIAA)	Gold	500,000^{‡}
^{‡} Sales+streaming figures based on certification alone.
