= Stargazing (EP) =

EP by Kygo
- Released: 22 September 2017
- Length: 14:01
- Labels: Sony; Ultra
- Producers: Kygo; Louis Bell; Stuart Crichton; Jamie Hartman; Andrew Watt; Hitimpulse; Jacknife Lee; Steve Lillywhite

Kygo chronology
| Cloud Nine (2016) | Stargazing (2017) | Kids in Love (2017) |

Singles from Stargazing
- 1. "It Ain't Me" Released: 16 February 2017; 2. "First Time" Released: 28 April 2017; 3. "Stargazing" Released: 22 September 2017

Stargazing is the debut extended play by Norwegian DJ Kygo. It was released through Sony Music and Ultra Music on 22 September 2017.

== Background ==
On 18 August 2017, Kygo debuted the title track at Jugendfest 2017, after which he posted two short clips of the performance to his Instagram Stories. On 1 September 2017, he performed the song with live vocals from Jesso at Encore Beach Club in Las Vegas. On 6 September 2017, Kygo revealed on Instagram that "new music coming very soon". He officially announced the EP's release date and revealed its accompanying artwork on 18 September 2017.

== Critical reception ==
Kat Bein of Billboard opined that Kygo "uses chopped vocal samples and glistening synthetic piano to create a tropical melody" instead of "his usual steel drums", and that "the kick drum hits hard on every other count, pushing the tune forward on the dance floor in a laidback way" on the title track. Karlie Powell of Your EDM felt the title track "takes on a whole new audible meaning as the producer's newest track dives into the touchy, feely realm of dance music he's known for".

== Track listing ==
Stargazing – standard edition
| No. | Title | Writer(s) | Producer(s) | Length |
|---|---|---|---|---|
| 1. | "Stargazing" (featuring Justin Jesso) | Kyrre Gørvell-Dahll; Jesso; Jamie Hartman; Stuart Crichton | Kygo; Crichton; Hartman | 3:45 |
| 2. | "It Ain't Me" (with Selena Gomez) | Gørvell-Dahll; Brian Lee; Ali Tamposi; Gomez; Andrew Watt | Kygo; Watt; Ben Rice; Louis Bell | 3:40 |
| 3. | "First Time" (with Ellie Goulding) | Gørvell-Dahll; Alexsej Vlasenko; Jonas Kalisch; Jeremy Chacon; Henrik Meinke | Kygo; Hitimpulse | 3:14 |
| 4. | "This Town" (featuring Sasha Sloan) | Gørvell-Dahll; Sloan; Noonie Bao | Kygo; Sloan | 3:22 |
| Total length: | | | | 14:01 |

Stargazing – expanded edition
| No. | Title | Writer(s) | Producer(s) | Length |
|---|---|---|---|---|
| 5. | "You're the Best Thing About Me" (Kygo remix; with U2) | Bono; The Edge; Adam Clayton; Larry Mullen Jr. | Jacknife Lee; Kygo | 4:18 |
| Total length: | | | | 18:19 |

Stargazing – United States release
| No. | Title | Writer(s) | Producer(s) | Length |
|---|---|---|---|---|
| 1. | "Stargazing" (featuring Justin Jesso) | Gørvell-Dahll; Jesso; Hartman; Crichton | Kygo; Crichton; Hartman | 3:45 |
| 2. | "First Time" (with Ellie Goulding) | Gørvell-Dahll; Vlasenko; Kalisch; Chacon; Meinke | Kygo; Hitimpulse | 3:14 |
| 3. | "This Town" (featuring Sasha Sloan) | Gørvell-Dahll; Sloan; Bao | Kygo; Sloan | 3:22 |
| Total length: | | | | 10:32 |

== Charts ==
=== Weekly charts ===
| Chart (2017) | Peak position |
|---|---|
| Australian Singles (ARIA) (Note: In Australia, EPs of five tracks or fewer chart on the singles chart.) | 40 |
| Canadian Albums (Billboard) | 17 |
| French Singles (SNEP) | 160 |
| New Zealand Albums (RMNZ) | 30 |
| Swedish Albums (Sverigetopplistan) | 12 |
| US Billboard 200 | 137 |
| US Top Dance Albums (Billboard) | 3 |

=== Year-end charts ===
| Chart (2017) | Position |
|---|---|
| US Top Dance/Electronic Albums (Billboard) | 25 |
| Chart (2018) | Position |
| US Top Dance/Electronic Albums (Billboard) | 11 |

== Certifications ==
| Region | Certification | Certified units/sales |
|---|---|---|
| Australia (ARIA) | Platinum | 70,000^{‡} |
| Canada (Music Canada) | Gold | 40,000^{‡} |
| New Zealand (RMNZ) | Platinum | 15,000^{‡} |
^{‡} Sales+streaming figures based on certification alone.
