= Never Really Loved Me =

2022 single by Kygo and Dean Lewis

Single by Kygo and Dean Lewis

from the album Thrill of the Chase
- Released: 1 July 2022
- Length: 3:22
- Label: RCA, Sony
- Songwriters: Kyrre Gørvell-Dahll; Dean Lewis; Adeliz Calderon; Anita Jobby
- Producers: Kygo; Stewart

Kygo singles chronology
"Freeze" (2022)	"Never Really Loved Me" (2022)	"Lost Without You" (2022)

Dean Lewis singles chronology
"Hurtless" (2022)	"Never Really Loved Me" (2022)	"Lost Without You" (2022)

Lyric video
- "Never Really Loved Me" on YouTube

"Never Really Loved Me" is a song by Norwegian record producer and DJ Kygo and Australian singer and songwriter Dean Lewis. It was released on 1 July 2022.

== Reception ==
Samuel from EDM Tunes called the song "a sensational classic" saying "The track is filled with memorable lyrics and Kygo style piano rifts. It is a beautiful creation that continues Kygo's legacy of being the tropical house king."

== Charts ==
Weekly chart performance for "Never Really Loved Me"
Chart (2022)	Peak position
Norway (VG-lista)	14
Sweden (Sverigetopplistan)	16
Switzerland (Schweizer Hitparade)	100
US Hot Dance/Electronic Songs (Billboard)	17

== Certifications ==
Certifications for "Never Really Loved Me"
Region	Certification	Certified units/sales
Sweden (GLF)	Gold	4,000,000^{†}
^{†} Streaming-only figures based on certification alone.
