= Kygo Life =

Lifestyle brand

Kygo Life AS
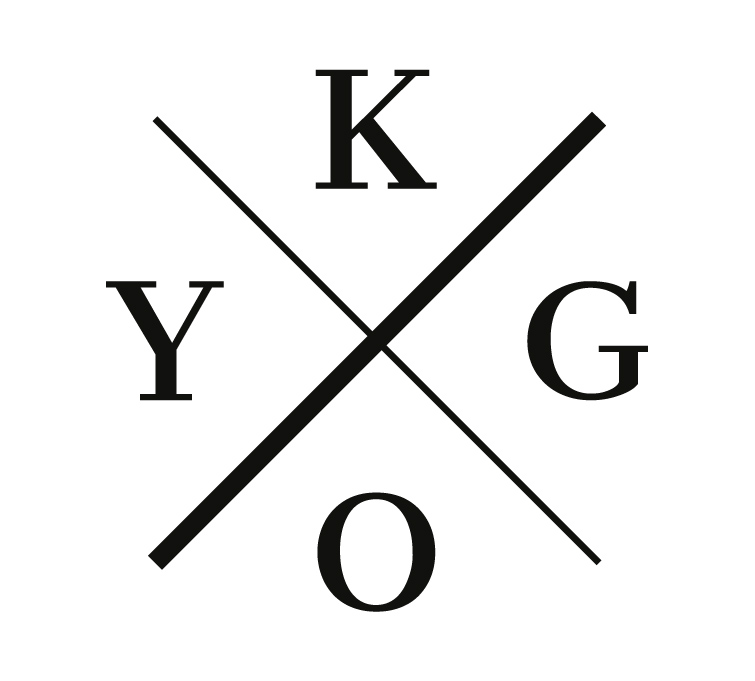
- Type: Aksjeselskap
- Industry: Audio
- Founded: 2016; 10 years ago
- Founders: Kyrre Gørvell-Dahll; Jon Inge Gullikstad
- Defunct: 2023
- Headquarters: Oslo, Norway
- Products: Fashion accessory; Headphones; Earphones; Loudspeakers
- Brands: Kygo Life; X By Kygo
- Website: kygolife.com at the Wayback Machine (archived 2018-07-09) xbykygo.com at the Wayback Machine (archived 2023-02-06)

Kygo Life was a lifestyle brand founded by the Norwegian music artist Kygo (Kyrre Gørvell-Dahll) and entrepreneur Jon Inge Gullikstad in 2016 and was headquartered in Oslo, Norway. The company started with a collection of audio products and a complete line of fashion and accessories with a Scandinavian minimalist style.

In December 2019, Kygo Life was officially rebranded to X By Kygo. The company shifted away from its initial casual clothing and technology segments to focus entirely on a catalog of premium audio products. The unveiling of this new chapter took place mid-month with the launch of the Xenon headphones which featured active noise cancellation and a distinctive "X" logo illuminated by LED lights.

According to the Norwegian business newspaper Finansavisen, the company closed in 2023 after several years of revenue failure. Consequently, the app for managing the audio devices were removed from the Google Play Store and the App Store the following year.

Kygo Life earphones

== Awards ==
Kygo Life worked with Nordic design and advertising agencies and won several awards.

- The Webby Awards 2017 - Webby Best Visual Design – Aesthetic for story.kygolife.com
- ED Awards European Design Award 2017 - Gold for Promotional site for story.kygolife.com
- Gulltaggen 2017 - Bronze for craft production on story.kygolife.com
- The Lovie Awards 2017 - Best Design (Websites) for story.kygolife.com
- Cresta International Advertising Awards 2017 - Bronze for visual design on story.kygolife.com
- Gullblyanten 2016 - Silver for packaging design.
