= The Night Game =

American rock band

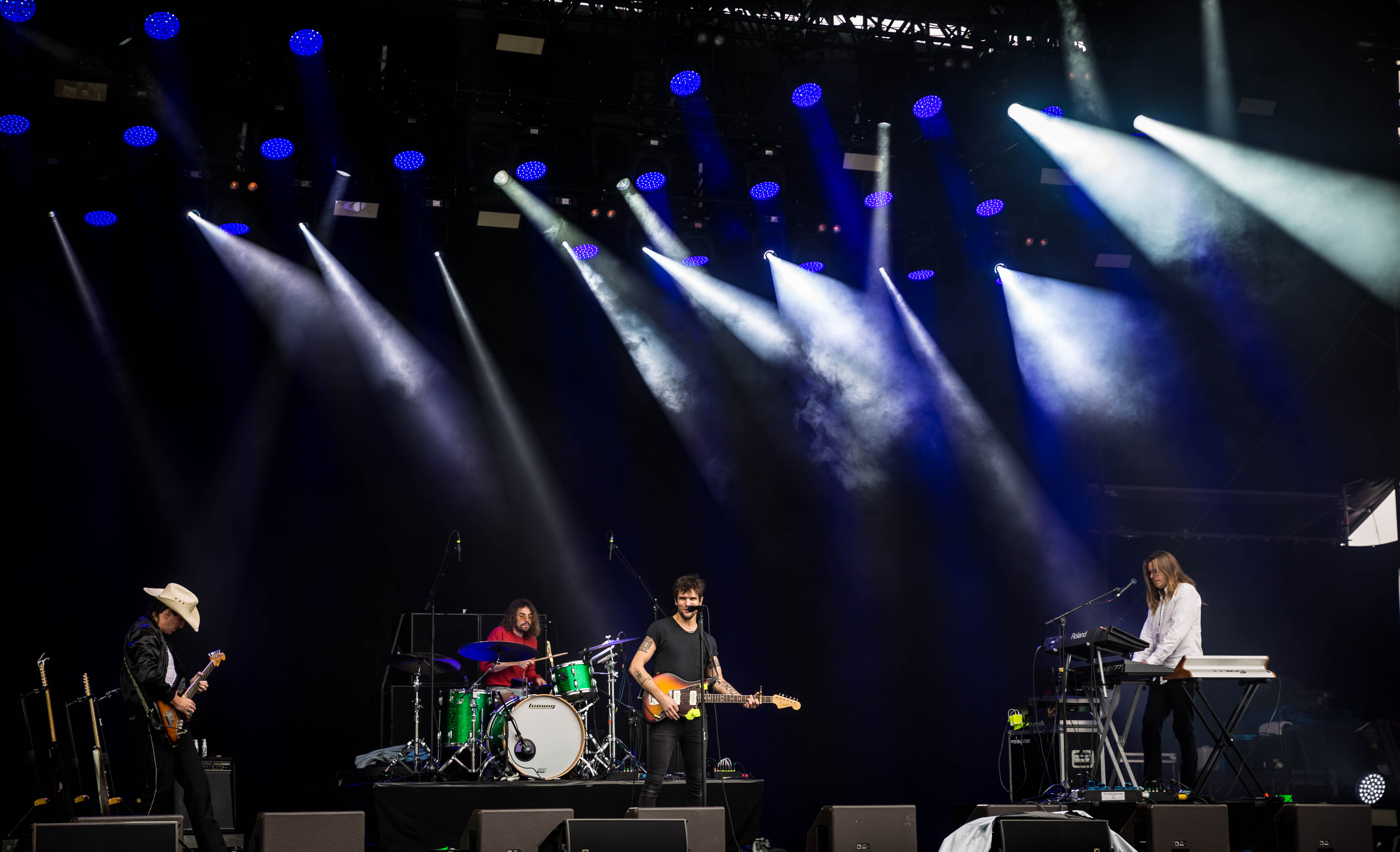
- The Night Game live at Rock am Ring 2018

Background information
- Origin: Boston, Massachusetts, United States
- Genres: Pop rock; alternative rock
- Years active: 2017–present
- Labels: Interscope; Vertigo; Real Johnson
- Members: Martin Johnson
- Past members: Kirin J. Callinan
- Website: thenightgame.com

The Night Game is an American rock band from Boston, Massachusetts, formed in 2017. Founded by American musician Martin Johnson, the group is composed of Johnson and multi-instrumentalist Kirin J. Callinan. They released their debut single, "The Outfield", in April 2017, followed by the release of their self-titled debut studio album, The Night Game, in September 2018. In March 2021, their second studio album, Dog Years, was released.

== Career ==
=== 2016–2019: Beginnings and The Night Game ===
Started by Johnson in 2016, The Night Game began writing music and playing small shows under the moniker "Impossible Color". Eventually Johnson changed the project's name to "The Night Game" based on a Paul Simon song. Johnson performed with a full band, including Australian artist Kirin J. Callinan. During the production of the band's first album Johnson recalls "being angry at music", noting that it became "an office job" and thought about quitting. For the first half of the production the music sounded very different being more in the singer-songwriter genre, most of these songs were eventually cut with only one song, "Once in a Lifetime" making it onto the actual album.

The group released their debut single, "The Outfield", on April 12, 2017. The song premiered on Billboard, and in an interview with the company, Johnson spoke about the single and the beginnings of the group. "This song felt like the best introduction to what I'm trying to do and a really good way to segue into the project, it felt anthemic, without being a throat jammer." He also stated, "I didn't want to force something out into the universe without feeling like it was a genuine extension of my personality," he explained. "For once in my life, I had the luxury of time, so I just went into the studio and took the time it takes."

Australian music producer Francois Tetaz helped write, record, and produce "The Outfield" and introduced the band to Belgian-Australian recording artist Gotye, who provided backing vocals in the song.

It was only two weeks following their release of "The Outfield" that the single was recognized by Grammy Award-winning singer-songwriter John Mayer via Spotify. Mayer took a liking to the song, exclaiming: "I heard this song. Then I listened to it again to make sure I heard what I thought I had. Then I asked them to open up for half the upcoming summer shows. This is that stuff we listen to new music for."

The band accepted the offer and marketed the opportunity as "The First Tour", performing thirty shows as the opening act on Mayer's The Search for Everything World Tour, followed by independent dates during July and August 2017. During the tour, they performed a full set of songs each night, though only having one single out for public consumption. This caused many new listeners to pay more attention to the band, asking and demanding more music, as the group gained a mass following via social media.

Following "The First Tour" accompanying Mayer, Johnson started to bring other works to the surface, starting with the music video release for "The Outfield" on August 22, 2017, directed by British musician Dev Hynes. Johnson then collaborated with Norwegian DJ Kygo on the song "Kids in Love", which released on October 20, 2017 on the album Kids in Love. An original band version of the track was released on February 2, 2018 as well.

Towards the end of 2017, Johnson followed up the success of "The Outfield" with a brand new song and video for "Once in a Lifetime". The video and single were released on November 16, 2017. The video was directed by the band's photographer/videographer Michael Hili.

Within the first month of 2018, Johnson announced via social media that the band would embark on the American Nights Tour in the Spring of that year, with the support of musical guest The Band Camino. The sixteen-date tour spanned across the United States, with debut appearances at Innings Music Festival, Shaky Knees Music Festival, BottleRock Napa Valley, and Firefly Music Festival.

On February 23, 2018, The Night Game released their fourth studio single, "Bad Girls Don't Cry". The band released their fifth single, "American Nights", on May 25, 2018. In addition to the single release, they also announced their self-titled debut album, released on September 7, 2018.

=== 2020–present: Dog Years ===
On May 18, 2020, The Night Game announced a new record called Dog Years that would be released in eleven installments. The first, "Magic Trick", was released May 29, 2020, and its music video debuted on YouTube on June 23, 2020. The second single, "One Phone Call", was issued on July 10, 2020.

== Members ==
- Martin Johnson – lead vocals, guitar, keyboards, programming
- Kirin J. Callinan – lead guitar (former)

== Discography ==
=== Albums ===
- The Night Game (2018)
- Dog Years (2021)

=== Singles ===
As lead artist

- "The Outfield" (2017)
- "Once In a Lifetime" (2017)
- "Kids in Love" (2018)
- "Bad Girls Don’t Cry" (2018)
- "American Nights" (2018)
- "Magic Trick" (2020)
- "One Phone Call" (2020)
- "I Feel Like Dancing" (2020)
- "A Postcard from the City of Angels" (2020)
- "Companion" featuring Elle King (2020)
- "Beautiful Stranger" (2021)

As featured artist

List of singles as featured artist, with selected chart positions
Title	Year	Peak chart positions										Album
Title	Year	US Bub.	AUS	BEL (FL) Tip	CAN	GER	NOR	POR	SWE	SWI	UK	Album
"Kids in Love" (Kygo featuring The Night Game)	2017	22	94	10	73	90	8	83	19	33	99	Kids in Love
