= Undeniable (Kygo song) =

2021 single by Kygo featuring X Ambassadors

Single by Kygo featuring X Ambassadors

from the album Thrill of the Chase
- Released: 15 October 2021
- Genre: Tropical house
- Length: 3:00
- Label: RCA
- Songwriters: Ethan Snoreck; Kyrre Gørvell-Dahll; Jacob Kasher; Nick Long; Patrick Martin; Sam Harris
- Producers: Kygo; Petey Martin

Kygo singles chronology
"Love Me Now" (2021)	"Undeniable" (2021)	"Dancing Feet" (2022)

X Ambassadors singles chronology
"Razor's Edge" (2021)	"Undeniable" (2021)	"Water" (2021)

"Undeniable" is a song by Norwegian record producer and DJ Kygo, featuring a guest appearance from American rock band X Ambassadors. It was released on 15 October 2021 through RCA Records. Kygo wrote the song with Ethan Snoreck, Jacob Kasher, Nick Long, Patrick Martin and X Ambassadors' lead vocalist Sam Harris, and produced it with Petey Martin. It also marks the first cooperation between both sides.

== Background ==
In a press release, X Ambassadors stated:

I've always had an affinity for big-ass love songs but don't often end up writing them. This one came together so organically and quickly—it was such a treat to write it with Kash, Nick, Whethan, and Kyrre. I honestly couldn’t be more excited to sing it at all my friend’s weddings.

== Content ==
Drew Barkin of EDMtunes described the song as "a heartfelt track that will get you thinking about loved ones". The song is written in the key of F♯ major, with a tempo of 108 beats per minute.

== Credits and personnel ==
Credits adapted from Tidal.

- Kygo – producer, composer, lyricist, associated performer
- X Ambassadors – associated performer
- Petey Martin – producer
- Ethan Snoreck – composer, lyricist
- Jacob Kasher – composer, lyricist
- Nick Long – composer, lyricist
- Patrick Martin – composer, lyricist
- Sam Nelson Harris – composer, lyricist
- Bryce Bordone – assistant engineer
- John Hanes – engineer
- Randy Merrill – mastering engineer
- Serban Ghenea – mixing engineer
- Ryan Dulude – recording engineer

== Charts ==
=== Weekly charts ===
Weekly chart performance for "Undeniable"
Chart (2021)	Peak position
Ireland (IRMA)	79
Netherlands (Dutch Top 40)	39
Norway (VG-lista)	8
Sweden (Sverigetopplistan)	41
Switzerland (Schweizer Hitparade)	55
US Hot Dance/Electronic Songs (Billboard)	8

=== Year-end charts ===
2022 year-end chart performance for "Undeniable"
Chart (2022)	Position
US Hot Dance/Electronic Songs (Billboard)	88
