= Thrill of the Chase =

2022 album by Kygo

Studio album by Kygo
- Released: 11 November 2022
- Genre: Tropical house; dance-pop
- Length: 53:15
- Label: RCA
- Producer: Kygo; Andrew Jackson; Cirkut; David Stewart; Duck Blackwell; Gryffin; Petey Martin; Robin Stjernberg; Stuart Crichton; Sam Feldt

Kygo chronology
Golden Hour (2020)	Thrill of the Chase (2022)	Kygo (2024)

Singles from Thrill of the Chase
- 1. "Gone Are the Days" Released: 16 April 2021; 2. "Love Me Now" Released: 13 August 2021; 3. "Undeniable" Released: 15 October 2021; 4. "Dancing Feet" Released: 25 February 2022; 5. "Freeze" Released: 6 May 2022; 6. "Never Really Loved Me" Released: 1 July 2022; 7. "Lost Without You" Released: 8 July 2022; 8. "Woke Up in Love" Released: 9 September 2022

Thrill of the Chase is the fourth studio album by Norwegian record producer and DJ Kygo. It was released on 11 November 2022 through RCA Records. The album features guest appearances from James Gillespie, Zoe Wees, Dagny, X Ambassadors, R.I.Pablo, DNCE, Lukas Graham, Gryffin, Calum Scott, Sam Feldt, Emily Warren, Dean Lewis, Plested, and Stuart Crichton. Production was handled by Kygo, Gryffin, Feldt, and Crichton themselves, along with Robin Stjernberg, Petey Martin, Cirkut, David Stewart, Andrew Jackson, and Duck Blackwell. Serving as the follow-up to Kygo's previous album, Golden Hour (2020), Thrill of the Chase blends pop and dance music much like his previous releases.

== Background ==
The album was released as a surprise with no prior announcement. However, Kygo hinted at a new album in an August 2022 interview with Audacy. The day before it was released, he announced that there would be a surprise coming at midnight, which would be the next day. On its release date, he explained the recording process of the album and shared his thoughts on it through a statement shared to EDM.com:

Thrill Of The Chase is a collection of songs I worked on over the last two years that started during Covid and ended with sessions in Los Angeles. I've had the chance to play or tease the unreleased music throughout the year at shows and the feedback was unbelievable. A few of the songs on Thrill Of The Chase are different from anything I've ever made in the past and I'm really excited for everyone to finally hear the album in its entirety.

== Singles ==
- The lead single of the album, "Gone Are the Days", which features Scottish singer-songwriter James Gillespie, was released on 16 April 2021.
- The second single, "Love Me Now", which features German singer-songwriter Zoe Wees, was released on 13 August 2021.
- The third single, "Undeniable", which features American band X Ambassadors, was released on 15 October 2021.
- The fourth single, "Dancing Feet", which features American band DNCE, was released on 25 February 2022.
- The fifth single, "Freeze", was released on 6 May 2022.
- The sixth single, "Never Really Loved Me", a collaboration with Australian singer-songwriter Dean Lewis, was released on 1 July 2022.
- The seventh single, "Lost Without You", another collaboration with Lewis, was released on 8 July 2022.
- The eighth and final single, "Woke Up in Love", a collaboration with American record producer Gryffin and English singer-songwriter Calum Scott, was released on 9 September 2022. This song is also part of Gryffin's second studio album Alive (2022).

== Track listing ==
Thrill of the Chase track listing
No.	Title	Writer(s)	Producer(s)	Length
1.	"Gone Are the Days" (featuring James Gillespie)	Kyrre Gørvell-Dahll; James Gillespie	Kygo	3:16
2.	"Love Me Now" (featuring Zoe Wees)	Gørvell-Dahll; Zoe Wees; Timothy Deal; Patrick Pyke Salmy; Ricardo Muñoz	Kygo	3:15
3.	"Lonely Together" (featuring Dagny)	Gørvell-Dahll; Dagny Norvoll Sandvik; Robin Stjernberg; Sandro Cavazza	Kygo; Stjernberg^{[a]}	2:58
4.	"Undeniable" (featuring X Ambassadors)	Gørvell-Dahll; Sam Harris; Ethan Snoreck; Jacob Kasher Hindlin; Nick Long; Patrick Martin	Kygo; Petey Martin	3:00
5.	"Thrill of the Chase" (featuring R.I.Pablo)	Gørvell-Dahll; Henry Walter; Amy Allen; Pablo Bowman	Kygo; Cirkut	3:18
6.	"Dancing Feet" (featuring DNCE)	Gørvell-Dahll; David Stewart; Rami Yacoub; Jessica Agombar	Kygo; Stewart	3:35
7.	"Fever" (featuring Lukas Graham)	Gørvell-Dahll; Lukas Forchhammer; Joseph Janiak; Martin	Kygo; Petey Martin^{[a]}	3:12
8.	"Woke Up in Love" (with Gryffin and Calum Scott)	Gørvell-Dahll; Dan Griffith; Calum Scott; Nathan Nicholson; Sam Grey; Joe Taylor	Kygo; Gryffin	3:36
9.	"How Many Tears" (with Sam Feldt featuring Emily Warren)	Gørvell-Dahll; Sam Feldt; Emily Warren; Max Wolfgang	Kygo; Sam Feldt	2:54
10.	"Never Really Loved Me" (with Dean Lewis)	Gørvell-Dahll; Dean Lewis; Adeliz Calderon; Anita Jobby	Kygo	3:22
11.	"The Way We Were" (featuring Plested)	Gørvell-Dahll; Philip Plested; Andrew Jackson	Kygo; Jackson^{[a]}	4:08
12.	"Lost Without You" (with Dean Lewis)	Gørvell-Dahll; Lewis; Calderon	Kygo	3:23
13.	"All for Love" (featuring Stuart Crichton)	Gørvell-Dahll; Stuart Crichton; Tommy Lee Jones	Kygo; Crichton^{[a]}	5:02
14.	"Freeze"	Gørvell-Dahll; Jackson; Duck Blackwell; Rory Adams	Kygo; Jackson; Blackwell	8:07
Total length:				53:15

Notes

- ^[a] signifies a co-producer

== Personnel ==
Musicians

- Kygo – strings (1)
- James Gillespie – vocals (1)
- Sean Lascelles – strings (1)
- Zoe Wees – vocals (2); background vocals (2)
- Dagny – vocals (3)
- Sam Harris – vocals (4)
- Casey Harris – keyboards (4)
- Adam Levin – drums (4)
- Joe Jonas – vocals (6)
- Jack Lawless – drums (6)
- JinJoo Lee – guitar (6)
- Lukas Forchhammer – vocals (7)
- Calum Scott – vocals (8)
- Emily Warren – vocals (9)
- Dean Lewis – vocals (10, 12)
- Stuart Crichton – vocals (13)
- Andrew Jackson – vocals (14)

Technical

- Serban Ghenea – mixing
- Randy Merrill – mastering
- John Hanes – engineering (1–2, 4–6, 8–10, 13, 14)
- Andy Hall Hall – vocal production (1)
- Patrick Pyke Salmy – recording (2)
- Ricardo Muñoz – recording (2)
- Bryce Bordone – engineering assistance (2–5, 7–9, 11–13)
- Ryan Dulude – recording (4)
- David Stewart – vocal production (6)
- Sean Lascelles – additional studio production (6)
- Lorna Blackwood – vocal production (8)
- Daniel Mirza – vocal production (9)
- Alex Borel – vocal production (10, 12)
- Colin Foote – vocal production (10, 12)
- Patrick Gardner – recording (12)

== Charts ==
Chart performance for Thrill of the Chase
Chart (2022)	Peak position
Canadian Albums (Billboard)	86
Japanese Digital Albums (Oricon)	46
Lithuanian Albums (AGATA)	59
Norwegian Albums (VG-lista)	4
Spanish Albums (Promusicae)	87
Swedish Albums (Sverigetopplistan)	27
Swiss Albums (Schweizer Hitparade)	32
UK Album Downloads (Official Charts)	31
UK Dance Albums (Official Charts)	2
US Top Dance Albums (Billboard)	4

== Certifications ==
Certifications for Thrill of the Chase
Region	Certification	Certified units/sales
Hungary (MAHASZ)	Gold	2,000^{‡}
^{‡} Sales+streaming figures based on certification alone.
