= Remind Me to Forget =

2018 single by Kygo ft. Miguel

Single by Kygo featuring Miguel

from the album Kids in Love
- Released: 16 March 2018
- Genre: Electro; tropical house; R&B
- Length: 3:37
- Label: Sony; Ultra; RCA
- Songwriters: David Phelan; Alex Oriet; Phil Plested
- Producer: Kygo

Kygo singles chronology
"Stranger Things" (2018)	"Remind Me to Forget" (2018)	"Born to Be Yours" (2018)

Miguel singles chronology
"Told You So" (2017)	"Remind Me to Forget" (2018)	"Come Through and Chill" (2018)

Music video
- "Remind Me to Forget" on YouTube

"Remind Me to Forget" is a song recorded by Norwegian record producer Kygo, featuring guest vocals from American singer Miguel. Written by David Phelan, Alex Oriet, Phil Plested and produced by Kygo, it was released on 16 March 2018 by Sony Music, Ultra Music and RCA Records, as the third and final single from Kygo's second studio album, Kids in Love (2017). The song was featured in the movie trailer for the 2019 film, Five Feet Apart.

== Release and composition ==
On 8 March 2018, a short clip of the song first surfaced on the internet. On 10 March 2018, Kygo announced the song on Instagram and Facebook with a series of promotional photos. "Remind Me to Forget" is a midtempo electro, tropical house and R&B track about "learning to let go of a love lost".

== Critical reception ==
The song was well received by music critics. Shanté Honeycutt of Billboard noted the song's potential to become "a summer dance jam", regarding it as a memorable song despite the title, writing: "Kygo's lighthearted production is a match for Miguel's powerhouse vocals". Kevin Goddard of HotNewHipHop called the song "another strong addition to both artist's growing catalog of hits", writing that it features an "uptempo and infectious dance-friendly production from Kygo", on which "Miguel shows off his vocals". Similarly, Essence's Rachaell Davis wrote that "the song features Miguel delivering his signature vocals over an infectious beat". Artistdirect deemed the song a mixture of Kygo's "upbeat tropical house sound" and "Miguel's seductive and sultry vocals", resulting in "an endlessly-playable melody". Rap-Up described the collaboration as "dance floor-ready", on which Miguel's "soothing" vocals are backed by "Kygo's melodic, pulsing instrumental". Karlie Powell of Your EDM opined that the song "bridges the gap between EDM and mainstream", as the two artists "play off each other's styles for a straight up unforgettable result".

== Music video ==
The official music video for "Remind Me to Forget", directed by Colin Tilley, was released on 6 May 2018 on Kygo's official YouTube channel. It features Miguel, a piano-playing Kygo, and a female ballerina performing in separate rooms of a house during some kind of cataclysm, with walls and furnishings being destroyed by unseen forces.

== Live performances ==
On 14 May 2018, Kygo and Miguel performed the song live on The Tonight Show Starring Jimmy Fallon.

== Credits and personnel ==
Credit adapted from Tidal.

- Kygo – production
- David Phelan – composition
- Alex Oriet – composition
- Phil Plested – composition
- Serban Ghenea – mix engineering
- Randy Merrill – master engineering
- John Hanes – engineering

== Charts ==
=== Weekly charts ===
Chart (2018)	Peak position
Australia (ARIA)	14
Australia Dance (ARIA)	2
Austria (Ö3 Austria Top 40)	4
Belgium (Ultratop 50 Flanders)	8
Belgium (Ultratop 50 Wallonia)	5
Canada Hot 100 (Billboard)	35
Croatia Airplay (HRT)	26
Czech Republic Airplay (ČNS IFPI)	1
Czech Republic Singles Digital (ČNS IFPI)	13
France (SNEP)	20
Germany (GfK)	14
Hungary (Rádiós Top 40)	6
Hungary (Single Top 40)	11
Hungary (Stream Top 40)	12
Ireland (IRMA)	29
Italy (FIMI)	89
Netherlands (Dutch Top 40)	6
Netherlands (Single Top 100)	18
New Zealand (Recorded Music NZ)	29
Norway (VG-lista)	2
Portugal (AFP)	54
Romania (Airplay 100)	33
Scottish Singles Sales (Official Charts)	72
Slovakia Airplay (ČNS IFPI)	4
Slovakia Singles Digital (ČNS IFPI)	8
Sweden (Sverigetopplistan)	3
Switzerland (Schweizer Hitparade)	2
UK Singles (Official Charts)	69
US Billboard Hot 100	63
US Dance Club Songs (Billboard)	1
US Hot Dance/Electronic Songs (Billboard)	4
US Pop Airplay (Billboard)	12

=== Year-end charts ===
Chart (2018)	Position
Australia (ARIA)	69
Austria (Ö3 Austria Top 40)	30
Belgium (Ultratop Flanders)	42
Belgium (Ultratop Wallonia)	25
Canada (Canadian Hot 100)	92
France (SNEP)	107
Germany (Official German Charts)	65
Hungary (Rádiós Top 40)	50
Hungary (Single Top 40)	82
Iceland (Plötutíóindi)	50
Netherlands (Dutch Top 40)	49
Netherlands (Single Top 100)	66
Portugal (AFP)	146
Romania (Airplay 100)	58
Sweden (Sverigetopplistan)	7
Switzerland (Schweizer Hitparade)	37
US Dance Club Songs (Billboard)	11
US Hot Dance/Electronic Songs (Billboard)	10

== Certifications ==
Region	Certification	Certified units/sales
Australia (ARIA)	2× Platinum	140,000^{‡}
Austria (IFPI Austria)	Gold	15,000^{‡}
Belgium (BRMA)	Gold	10,000^{‡}
Canada (Music Canada)	4× Platinum	320,000^{‡}
Denmark (IFPI Danmark)	Platinum	90,000^{‡}
France (SNEP)	Platinum	200,000^{‡}
Germany (BVMI)	Gold	200,000^{‡}
Italy (FIMI)	Gold	25,000^{‡}
New Zealand (RMNZ)	2× Platinum	60,000^{‡}
Poland (ZPAV)	Platinum	20,000^{‡}
Spain (Promusicae)	Gold	30,000^{‡}
Switzerland (IFPI Switzerland)	Platinum	20,000^{‡}
United Kingdom (BPI)	Silver	200,000^{‡}
Streaming
Sweden (GLF)	4× Platinum	32,000,000^{†}
^{‡} Sales+streaming figures based on certification alone.^{†} Streaming-only figures based on certification alone.

== Release history ==
Region	Date	Format	Label	Ref.
Various	16 March 2018	Digital download	Sony; Ultra; RCA	
Italy	30 March 2018	Contemporary hit radio	Sony	
United States	15 May 2018	Contemporary hit radio	RCA	
