= Love Me Now (Kygo song) =

2021 single by Kygo and Zoe Wees

Single by Kygo featuring Zoe Wees

from the album Thrill of the Chase
- Released: 13 August 2021
- Genre: Tropical house
- Length: 3:15
- Label: RCA
- Songwriters: Hight; Kyrre Gørvell-Dahll; Patrick Pyke Salmy; Ricardo Muñoz; Zoe Wees
- Producer: Kygo

Kygo singles chronology
"Gone Are the Days" (2021)	"Love Me Now" (2021)	"Undeniable" (2021)

Zoe Wees singles chronology
"Hold Me Like You Used To" (2021)	"Love Me Now" (2021)	"That's How It Goes" (2021)

Music video
- "Love Me Now" on YouTube

"Love Me Now" is a song by Norwegian DJ and producer Kygo featuring German singer-songwriter Zoe Wees. It was released on 13 August 2021 through RCA Records, as the 2nd single from Kygo's 4th album Thrill of the Chase.

== Composition ==
Matthew Meadow of Youredm commented Kygo regress to "characteristic piano plucks and beautiful melodies", then mentioned it become "a little obsolete for fans who seek innovation of producer".

== Critical reception ==
Niko Sani of edm.com praised the track: "features an immaculate summertime vibe representative of Kygo's signature sound." "intoxicating, feel-good summer jam and perfect ballad to finished the summer".

== Music video ==
It has two videos for the song. The animated video was released on August 13, 2021. The official video was released on September 21, 2021, which stars Brittany O'Grady as Kygo's love interest. It was filmed on the Exumas in the Bahamas.

== Credits and personnel ==
Credits adapted from Tidal.

- Kygo – producer, composer, lyricist, associated performer
- Zoe Wees – composer, lyricist, associated performer, background vocal, lead vocalist
- Patrick Pyke Salmy – composer, lyricist, recording engineer, vocal engineer
- Ricardo Muñoz – composer, lyricist, recording engineer, vocal engineer
- Hight – composer, lyricist
- Bryce Bordone – assistant engineer
- John Hanes – engineer
- Randy Merrill – mastering engineer
- Serban Ghenea – mixing engineer

== Charts ==
=== Weekly charts ===
Weekly chart performance for "Love Me Now"
Chart (2021–2022)	Peak position
Austria (Ö3 Austria Top 40)	62
Canada Hot 100 (Billboard)	73
Czech Republic Airplay (ČNS IFPI)	23
Germany (GfK)	69
New Zealand Hot Singles (RMNZ)	11
Norway (VG-lista)	5
Sweden (Sverigetopplistan)	17
Switzerland (Schweizer Hitparade)	28
US Hot Dance/Electronic Songs (Billboard)	9

=== Year-end charts ===
Year-end chart performance for "Love Me Now"
Chart (2021)	Position
US Hot Dance/Electronic Songs (Billboard)	49

== Certifications ==
Certifications for "Love Me Now"
Region	Certification	Certified units/sales
Austria (IFPI Austria)	Gold	15,000^{‡}
Streaming
Sweden (GLF)	Platinum	8,000,000^{†}
^{‡} Sales+streaming figures based on certification alone.^{†} Streaming-only figures based on certification alone.

== Release history ==
Release history for "Love Me Now"
Region	Date	Format	Label	Ref.
Various	13 August 2021	Digital download; streaming	RCA	
