= Lost Without You (Kygo and Dean Lewis song) =

2022 single by Kygo and Dean Lewis

Single by Kygo with Dean Lewis

from the album Thrill of the Chase
- Released: 8 July 2022
- Length: 3:23
- Label: RCA; Sony
- Songwriters: Kyrre Gørvell-Dahll; Dean Lewis; Adeliz Calderon; Anita Jobby
- Producers: Kygo; Stewart

Kygo singles chronology
| "Never Really Loved Me" (2022) | "Lost Without You" (2022) | "Woke Up in Love" (2022) |

Dean Lewis singles chronology
| "Never Really Loved Me" (2022) | "Lost Without You" (2022) | "How Do I Say Goodbye" (2022) |

Music video
- "Lost Without You" on YouTube

"Lost Without You" is a song by Norwegian record producer and DJ Kygo with Australian singer and songwriter Dean Lewis. It was released on 8 July 2022, and serves as the second collaboration between the two after "Never Really Loved Me", released a week before.

== Reception ==
Ryan Ford from We Rave You said "While it maintains an upbeat nature, the newest of the two sublime productions tells a heart-wrenching love story as Lewis drives home raw emotion with his dulcet tones and poignant lyricism. Add to that the meticulous piano and guitar melodies typical of Kygo and we are left with another soft and serene dance record that pulls on the heartstrings."

== Music video ==
The music video for "Lost Without You" was filmed in Norway and directed by Johannes Lovund, serving as a continuation of "Never Really Loved Me"'s lyric video. The clip follows the relationship of the two main characters (played by Kygo and model Meredith Mickelson) as they go from childhood sweethearts to adults, culminating in a heartbreaking end.

== Charts ==
=== Weekly charts ===
Weekly chart performance for "Lost Without You"
| Chart (2022–2023) | Peak position |
|---|---|
| Belgium (Ultratop 50 Flanders) | 40 |
| Czech Republic Airplay (ČNS IFPI) | 21 |
| Netherlands (Dutch Top 40) | 38 |
| Sweden (Sverigetopplistan) | 66 |
| US Hot Dance/Electronic Songs (Billboard) | 10 |

=== Year-end charts ===
Year-end chart performance for "Lost Without You"
| Chart (2022) | Position |
|---|---|
| Belgium (Ultratop 50 Flanders) | 130 |
| US Hot Dance/Electronic Songs (Billboard) | 44 |
