= Kygo (album) =

Studio album by Kygo
- Released: 21 June 2024
- Genres: Dance-pop; tropical house; progressive house
- Length: 63:48
- Label: RCA
- Producers: Stuart Crichton; Emmit Fenn; Kygo; Franklin; Ollie Green; Petey Martin; Luke Niccoli; Nile Rodgers

Kygo chronology
Thrill of the Chase (2022)	Kygo (2024)

Singles from Kygo
- 1. "Whatever" Released: 19 January 2024; 2. "For Life" Released: 19 April 2024; 3. "Without You" Released: 31 May 2024; 4. "Me Before You" Released: 14 June 2024

Kygo is the fifth studio album by Norwegian record producer and DJ Kygo. It was released on 21 June 2024 through RCA Records. The album contains guest appearances from Sigrid, Ava Max, Fred Well, Plested, the Jonas Brothers, Zak Abel, Julia Michaels, Chance Peña, Sandro Cavazza, Emmit Fenn, Sasha Alex Sloan, Nile Rodgers, Hayla, and Matt Hansen. Production was handled by Kygo and Nile Rodgers themselves, alongside Petey Martin, Luke Niccoli, Ollie Green, Franklin, and Stuart Crichton. It serves as the follow-up to Kygo's previous album, Thrill of the Chase (2022).

== Singles and promotion ==
The lead single of the album, "Whatever", a collaboration with American singer-songwriter Ava Max, was released on 19 January 2024. The second single, "For Life", a collaboration with English singer-songwriter Zak Abel that features American musician Nile Rodgers, was released on 19 April 2024. On 30 May 2024, Kygo announced the title of the album alongside its cover art and release date. The third single, "Without You", a collaboration with British singer-songwriter Hayla, was released the following day. Kygo revealed the tracklist of the album on 10 June 2024. The fourth single, "Me Before You", a collaboration with English singer-songwriter Plested, was released four days later.

== Track listing ==
Kygo track listing
No.	Title	Writer(s)	Producer(s)	Length
1.	"Intro"	Kyrre Gørvell-Dahll	Kygo	1:15
2.	"The Feeling" (with Sigrid)	Gørvell-Dahll; Johan Lindbrandt; Julia Gargano	Kygo; Anders Nilsen^{[v]}	3:10
3.	"Whatever" (with Ava Max)	Gørvell-Dahll; Amanda Koci; Shakira; Tim Mitchell; Gloria Estefan; Cleo Tighe; Roland Spreckley; Jonah Sky; Patrick Martin	Kygo; Petey Martin	2:58
4.	"Surrender" (with Fred Well)	Gørvell-Dahll; Fredrik Brurås; Robin Stjernberg; Mads Songve; Lindbrandt	Kygo	3:16
5.	"Can't Do It on My Own"	Gørvell-Dahll	Kygo	4:04
6.	"Me Before You" (with Plested)	Gørvell-Dahll; Philip Plested; Michael Wise	Kygo; Wise^{[v]}	3:35
7.	"Healing (Shattered Heart)" (with Jonas Brothers)	Gørvell-Dahll; Calle Lehmann	Kygo	2:42
8.	"Lighthouse" (with Zak Abel)	Gørvell-Dahll; Zak Zilesnick; Sandro Cavazza; Songve	Kygo	3:11
9.	"Found Another Love"	Gørvell-Dahll	Kygo	4:22
10.	"Louder" (with Julia Michaels and Chance Peña)	Gørvell-Dahll; Julia Michaels; Martin; Victor Ray; Bill Maybury	Kygo; Martin	3:00
11.	"Fade Away" (with Sandro Cavazza)	Gørvell-Dahll; Cavazza; Songve	Kygo	5:05
12.	"Hold On" (featuring Emmit Fenn)	Gørvell-Dahll; Emmit Fenn	Kygo • Emmit Fenn	4:18
13.	"Let Go" (with Sasha Alex Sloan)	Gørvell-Dahll; Sasha Alex Sloan; Mikky Ekko; Luke Niccoli	Kygo; Niccoli	3:07
14.	"For Life" (with Zak Abel featuring Nile Rodgers)	Gørvell-Dahll; Zilesnick; Nile Rodgers; Ollie Green; Bernard Edwards; Ben Duncombe; Romain Tranchart; Yann Destangol	Kygo; Rodgers; Green; Franklin	2:55
15.	"Without You" (with Hayla)	Gørvell-Dahll; Hayley Williams; Maegan Cottone; Magnus Skylstad; Jenson Vaughan	Kygo; Skylstad^{[a]}	4:23
16.	"Wait – Kygo Remix" (2024 edit)	Gørvell-Dahll; Justin Meldal-Johnsen; Brad Laner; Morgan Kibby; Yann Gonzalez; Anthony Gonzalez	Kygo	5:35
17.	"You Can Feel"	Gørvell-Dahll	Kygo	3:11
18.	"Love Me Now or Lose Me Later" (with Matt Hansen)	Gørvell-Dahll; Matt Hansen; Stuart Crichton; James Norton	Kygo; Crichton	3:41
Total length:				63:48

Notes

- ^{^[a]} signifies an additional producer
- ^{^[v]} signifies a vocal producer
- "Whatever" interpolates the song "Whenever, Wherever" (2001), written by Tim Mitchell & Gloria Estefan and performed by Shakira.
- "For Life" interpolates the song "Lady (Hear Me Tonight)" (2000), written by Bernard Edwards & Nile Rodgers and performed by Modjo.

== Personnel ==
- Randy Merrill – mastering
- Serban Ghenea – mixing
- Bryce Bordone – engineering assistance
- Petey Martin – acoustic guitar, drums, electric guitar, keyboards, percussion, piano, strings, and synthesizer on "Whatever"
- Ian Rene Parent – recording on "Whatever"
- Terena Dawn – engineering assistance on "Whatever"
- Ollie Green – piano on "For Life"

== Charts ==
=== Weekly charts ===
Weekly chart performance for Kygo
Chart (2024–2025)	Peak position
Austrian Albums (Ö3 Austria)	52
Belgian Albums (Ultratop Flanders)	105
Belgian Albums (Ultratop Wallonia)	182
Canadian Albums (Billboard)	39
Dutch Albums (Album Top 100)	49
Finnish Albums (Suomen virallinen lista)	33
French Albums (SNEP)	44
German Albums (Offizielle Top 100)	86
Italian Albums (FIMI)	95
Japanese Digital Albums (Oricon)	19
Japanese Hot Albums (Billboard Japan)	67
Lithuanian Albums (AGATA)	70
New Zealand Albums (RMNZ)	40
Norwegian Albums (VG-lista)	1
Portuguese Albums (AFP)	172
Spanish Albums (Promusicae)	77
Swedish Albums (Sverigetopplistan)	20
Swiss Albums (Schweizer Hitparade)	7
UK Albums (Official Charts)	62
UK Dance Albums (Official Charts)	1
US Billboard 200	97
US Top Dance Albums (Billboard)	2

=== Year-end charts ===
Year-end chart performance for Kygo
Chart (2024)	Position
Australian Dance Albums (ARIA)	47
US Top Dance/Electronic Albums (Billboard)	25
