= Woke Up in Love (Kygo, Gryffin and Calum Scott song) =

2022 single by Kygo, Gryffin and Calum Scott

Single by Kygo, Gryffin and Calum Scott

from the album Thrill of the Chase and Alive
- Released: 9 September 2022
- Length: 3:36
- Label: RCA, Sony
- Songwriters: Kyrre Gørvell-Dahll; Daniel Griffith; Calum Scott; Nathan Nicholson; Sam Gray; Joe Taylor
- Producers: Kygo; Gryffin

Kygo singles chronology
| "Lost Without You" (2022) | "Woke Up in Love" (2022) | "Say Say Say" (2023) |

Gryffin singles chronology
| "Colors" (2022) | "Woke Up in Love" (2022) | "Scandalous" (2022) |

Calum Scott singles chronology
| "Boys in the Street" (2022) | "Woke Up in Love" (2022) | "Run with Me" (2022) |

Music video
- Woke Up in Love" on YouTube

"Woke Up in Love" is a song by Norwegian record producer and DJ Kygo, American DJ Gryffin and English singer Calum Scott. It was released on 9 September 2022 as the eighth and final single from Kygo's fourth studio album, Thrill of the Chase and ninth single from Gryffin's second studio album, Alive.

== Reception ==
Zach Salafia from Dancing Astronaut said "Summer may be on its way out the door, but it's impossible not to picture sunny skies and white sandy beaches while listening to 'Woke Up in Love'. Calum Scott provides the angelic vocals on what can only be described as a perfectly balanced collaboration between two of dance music's biggest, brightest stars."

== Music video ==
The music video was directed by Johannes Lovund and released on 22 September 2022.

== Track listing ==
- Digital download and streaming
1. "Woke Up in Love" – 3:36
- Digital download and streaming – Alok remix
1. "Woke Up in Love" (Alok remix) – 2:46
- Digital download and streaming – acoustic
1. "Woke Up in Love" (acoustic) – 3:02

== Charts ==
=== Weekly charts ===
Weekly chart performance for "Woke Up in Love"
| Chart (2022) | Peak position |
|---|---|
| Belgium (Ultratop 50 Flanders) | 38 |
| Canada Hot 100 (Billboard) | 87 |
| New Zealand Hot Singles (RMNZ) | 8 |
| Norway (VG-lista) | 23 |
| Sweden (Sverigetopplistan) | 27 |
| Switzerland (Schweizer Hitparade) | 42 |
| US Hot Dance/Electronic Songs (Billboard) | 9 |

=== Year-end charts ===
2022 year-end chart performance for "Woke Up in Love"
| Chart (2022) | Position |
|---|---|
| US Hot Dance/Electronic Songs (Billboard) | 87 |

2023 year-end chart performance for "Woke Up in Love"
| Chart (2023) | Position |
|---|---|
| US Hot Dance/Electronic Songs (Billboard) | 63 |

== Certifications ==
Certifications for "Woke Up in Love"
| Region | Certification | Certified units/sales |
|---|---|---|
| Sweden (GLF) | Gold | 4,000,000^{†} |
^{†} Streaming-only figures based on certification alone.
