= Stranger Things (Kygo song) =

- Alan Walker remix cover

Single by Kygo featuring OneRepublic

from the album Kids in Love
- Released: 24 January 2018
- Genre: Pop; tropical house
- Length: 3:43
- Label: Sony; Ultra
- Composers: Kyrre Gørvell-Dahll; Ryan Tedder; Casey Smith
- Lyricist: Ryan Tedder
- Producer: Kygo

Kygo singles chronology
"Kids in Love" (2017)	"Stranger Things" (2018)	"Remind Me to Forget" (2018)

OneRepublic singles chronology
"Rich Love" (2017)	"Stranger Things" (2018)	"Start Again" (2018)

Music video
- "Stranger Things" on YouTube

"Stranger Things" is a song recorded by Norwegian DJ and record producer Kygo, featuring American pop rock band OneRepublic. It was composed by Kygo, Ryan Tedder and Casey Smith, with lyrics written by Tedder and production handled by Kygo. It was released on 24 January 2018 by Sony and Ultra Music, as the second single from Kygo's second studio album, Kids in Love (2017). Alan Walker remixed this song in February 2018.

== Critical reception ==
The song received positive reviews from music critics. Kat Bein of Billboard deemed the song an "emotive pop ballad" with "a slow, steady build". David Rishty of the same publication wrote that it "taps into some Bruce Springsteen vibes with strumming guitars, underground narratives and a pushing voice". Mike Wass of Idolator named the song "one of the most anthemic" on the album.

== Music video ==
The accompanying music video was directed by Tim Mattia. It depicts a love story of a young couple, who are tired of their jobs at the diner and mechanic's office. Intercut with clips of them drinking beers in chained-fence yards and buying groceries, they later broke into a mansion in Los Angeles, where they make out in their underwear. The female partner was eventually caught by the police.

== Credits and personnel ==
Credits adapted from Tidal.

- Kygo – composition, production
- Ryan Tedder – composition, lyrics
- Casey Smith – composition
- Alex Spencer – mix engineering
- Erik Madrid – mix engineering
- Sören von Malmborg – master engineering

== Charts ==
=== Weekly charts ===
Chart (2017–18)	Peak position
Ireland (IRMA)	92
Latvia (DigiTop100)	73
Slovakia Airplay (ČNS IFPI)	73
Sweden (Sverigetopplistan)	56
Switzerland (Schweizer Hitparade)	48
US Hot Dance/Electronic Songs (Billboard)	13

=== Year-end charts ===
Chart (2018)	Position
US Hot Dance/Electronic Songs (Billboard)	56

== Certifications ==
Region	Certification	Certified units/sales
Canada (Music Canada)	Gold	40,000^{‡}
^{‡} Sales+streaming figures based on certification alone.
