= Freeze (Kygo song) =

2022 single by Kygo

Single by Kygo

from the album Thrill of the Chase
- Released: 6 May 2022
- Genre: Progressive house
- Length: 8:07
- Label: RCA
- Songwriters: Kyrre Gørvell-Dahll; Andrew Jackson; Duck Blackwell; Rory Adams
- Producers: Kygo; Blackwell; Adams

Kygo singles chronology
"Dancing Feet" (2022)	"Freeze" (2022)	"Never Really Loved Me" (2022)

Music video
- "Freeze" on YouTube

"Freeze" is a song by Norwegian record producer and DJ Kygo. It was released as a single through RCA Records on 6 May 2022. The song features vocals from English singer-songwriter and record producer Andrew Jackson, who is not credited as an artist on the song. The song was produced by Kygo, Jackson, and Duck Blackwell. All three wrote it alongside Rory Adams.

== Background ==
In a press release, Kygo said: "'Freeze' is a really special record to me. I always try experimenting with new sounds and styles and feel that this song is different than anything I've ever release [sic]. I'm excited for my fans to hear this one and hope they like it as much as I do."

== Composition and lyrics ==
Compared to Kygo's previous single, "Dancing Feet", which was released earlier in 2022, "Freeze" is a calmer song. The song opens up with a soft piano melody. Lyrically, it is about wanting to give up during hard life lessons. The song starts off with shining synths as the bassline comes in for the house chorus. Cameron Sunkel of EDM felt that "the track's cathartic moments feel markedly more cinematic compared to anything Kygo has released previously, a continued testament to the producer's experimental spirit".

== Music video ==
The official music video for "Freeze", directed by Rafatoon, premiered alongside the song on 6 May 2022. The video is focused on a young couple's memories of their relationship. After the death of one of the couple, the other takes to space to find her.

== Credits and personnel ==
- Kygo – production, songwriting
- Andrew Jackson – vocals, production, songwriting
- Duck Blackwell – production, songwriting
- Rory Adams – songwriting
- Serban Ghenea – mixing
- Randy Merrill – mastering
- John Hanes – engineering

== Charts ==
Chart performance for "Freeze"
Chart (2022)	Peak position
Norway (VG-lista)	37
Sweden Heatseeker (Sverigetopplistan)	8
US Hot Dance/Electronic Songs (Billboard)	11
