= Justin Jesso =

American singer and songwriter

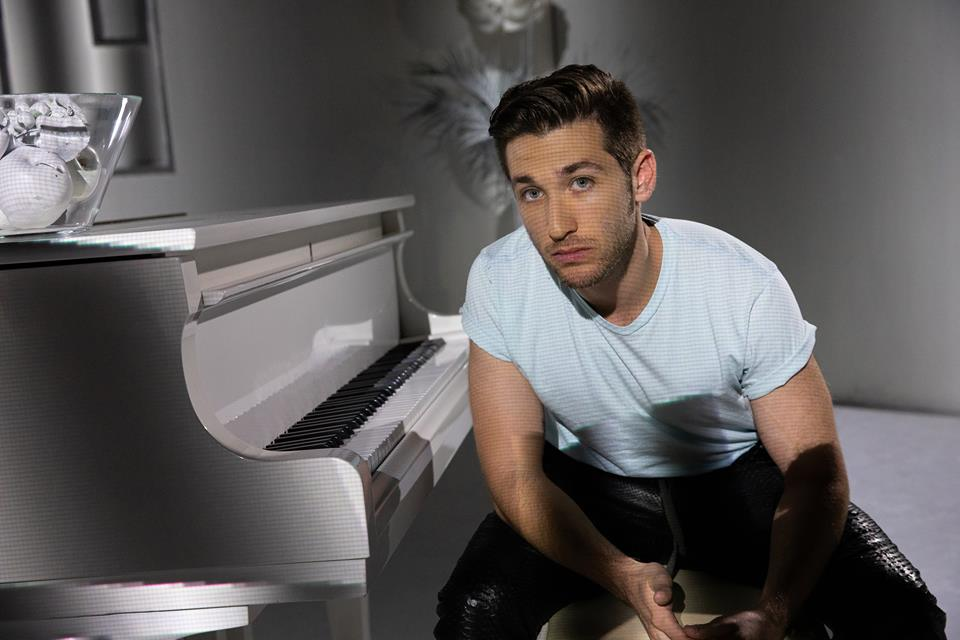
- Singer and songwriter Justin Jesso

Background information
- Born: Justin Stein
- Origin: Chicago, United States
- Occupations: Singer; songwriter
- Instruments: Vocals; guitar; piano
- Years active: 2016–present
- Website: justin-jesso.com

Justin Jesso (born Justin Stein) is an American singer and songwriter. He has written songs for Hrvy, AJ Mitchell, The Backstreet Boys and Armin van Buuren. He was nominated for Song of the Year at the 2017 Latin Grammy Awards for co-writing Ricky Martin's single "Vente Pa' Ca" (2016). He is a co-writer and featured artist on Kygo's "Stargazing" (2017).

== Early life ==
Jesso grew up in a northern suburb of Chicago. As a youngster he wrote his own songs and also performed on stage in various theatres across Chicago performing his breakout hit, "Lose Control." In later life, he studied songwriting at the Clive Davis Institute in New York.

== Career ==
Jesso has written for many artists, including HRVY, The Backstreet Boys and AJ Mitchell.

In 2016, he co-wrote the Ricky Martin song "Vente Pa' Ca" featuring Maluma, which was nominated for Best Song at the 2017 Latin Grammy Awards. It lost out to "Despacito".

In 2017, Justin co-wrote "Stargazing" for Kygo with Stuart Crichton and Jamie Hartman. In 2018, he supported Kygo on his sold-out arena tour in Asia, Australia, Europe and North America. More recently, he co-wrote "The Way It Was" for The Backstreet Boy's latest album DNA.

Jesso released an EP, Let It Be Me in December 2018. The lead single "Getting Closer" was written after he toured with Kygo, and was about the loneliness of life on tour. The video, which was directed by Kyle Cogan, shares real footage of Jesso's time spent on tour. The song was popular in Europe, and was a top ten radio hit in Germany, Switzerland and Austria. It also charted at 11 in the German iTunes chart.

In February 2019, Jesso supported Tears for Fears on the European leg of their Rule The World tour. Jesso embarked on his first headline tour in North America in April 2019, where we played to venues in Los Angeles, Chicago and New York.

In June 2019, he released the title track, "Let It Be Me", a duet with Scottish singer-songwriter Nina Nesbitt.

In March 2022, he was announced as the representative of Illinois for the inaugural American Song Contest, set to begin later in the month. He competed in the fifth episode and did not qualify for the live semi-finals.

On Saturday, January 29th 2023, Justin sang the National Anthem at Gulfstream Park before the three Pegasus Stakes races.

== Discography ==
=== EPs ===
Title	Year	Track listing
Let It Be Me	2019	1. "Let It Be Me"; 2. "Getting Closer"; 3. "I Will"; 4. "My Body"; 5. "One Good Reason"
Finding the Opposite of Loneliness	2022	1. "Lose Ya"; 2. "Clarity"; 3. "If You're Meant to Come Back"; 4. "Lifeline"; 5. "Drink Alone"; 6. "Bigger Than"; 7. "Miracle"; 8. "400 Trillion"; 9. "The End"

=== Singles ===
Titel	Jahr
"Lovin' You" (Glowinthedark feat. Justin Stein)	2016
"Better" (Atomic feat. Justin Stein)	2016
"Stargazing" (Kygo feat. Justin Jesso)	2017
"My Body"	2018
"Getting Closer"	2018
"I Will"	2018
"Let It Be Me"	2018
"One Good Reason"	2018
"Let It Be Me" (Justin Jesso & Nina Nesbitt)	2019
"Stitch Em Up" (Frank Walker feat. Justin Jesso)	2019
"As Far As Feelings Go" (Alle Farben feat. Justin Jesso)	2019
"Bigger Than"	2019
"Bigger Than" (Acoustic)	2020
"If You're Meant To Come Back"	2020
"Too Good To Lose"	2020
"The End"	2020
"They Don't Know Me" (Papa Zeus feat. Justin Jesso)	2021
"Spinnin'" (LOVRA feat. Justin Jesso)	2021
"Under" (Sebastian Fitzek feat. Justin Jesso)	2021
"Clarity"	2022
"Come Clean" (Adventure Club & Prince Fox feat. Justin Jesso)	2022
"400 Trillion"	2022
"Lifeline" (for American Song Contest)	2022
"Lose Ya"	2022
"I'll Be There" (Andrea Berg feat. Justin Jesso)	2022
"Me Without Us" (Matisse & Sadko, Raiden feat. Justin Jesso)	2022
"Time Machine" (Petey Martin feat. Justin Jesso)	2023
"Beautiful World" (Michael Bolton feat. Justin Jesso)	2023
"Sound of Freedom" (Sound of Freedom soundtrack)	2023
"Over You" (Ofenbach feat. Justin Jesso)	2024
"Save Me" (Boris Way feat. Justin Jesso)	2024
"Have Yourself A Merry Little Christmas"	2024
"Firestone (Live from Madison Sqare Garden)" (Kygo feat. Justin Jesso)	2024
"Lonely Tonight" (Sam Feldt, Parson James, Justin Jesso)	2025
"It Was Love" (Mike Perry feat. Justin Jesso)	2025
"Stronger" (Luca-Dante Spadafora, Lumix, Justin Jesso)	2025
"Unreasonable"	2025
"Sleep Alone" (220 Kid feat. Justin Jesso)	2025
"Are You With Me" (Said The Sky feat. Justin Jesso)	2025
"Unreasonable" (Acoustic)	2025
"Patience" (Patric Scott feat. Justin Jesso)	2025
"Stuck In The Middle"	2025
"Growing Up" (Justin Jesso & Zhangye)	2025
"Closer"	2026
"Sinners On The Moon" (Sam Feldt feat.Justin Jesso)	2026
"Ready To Blow"	2026
"Closer" (Arti Jack Remix)	2026
"Eastside" (JACK-O feat. Justin Jesso)	2026
"Sex On The Beach" (T-Spoon, Brando, Bryan V, Justin Jesso)	2026
"Heaven Without Dying"	2026

==== Songwriting credits ====
Title	Artist	Year
"Vente Pa' Ca"	Ricky Martin ft. Maluma	2016
"Batman & Robin"	Cazzi Opeia & Jin X Jin	2017
"Critical Beauty"	Pentagon	2017
"Frontiers"	The Rampage from Exile Tribe	2017
"I Don't Think About You"	HRVY	2017
"I Won't Remember You Tomorrow"	Alli Simpson	2017
"Say Hi"	Codeko & Austin Mahone	2017
"Somebody Like You"	In Real Life	2017
"Stargazing"	Kygo ft. Justin Jesso	2017
"Summer Something"	Carlos Marco	2017
"Weigh Me Down"	Matt Terry	2017
"Crazy 4 U"	Taemin	2017
"What U Do?"	Exo	2017
"Convince You"	Dominique	2018
"Getting Closer"	Justin Jesso	2018
"Got A Little Drunk"	Madcon	2018
"I Don't Want You Back"	AJ Mitchell	2018
"I Will"	Justin Jesso	2018
"My Body"	Justin Jesso	2018
"One Good Reason"	Justin Jesso	2018
"Let It Be Me"	Justin Jesso & Nina Nesbitt	2019
"Phone Down"	Armin van Buuren & Garibay	2019
"Stitch Em Up"	Frank Walker ft. Justin Jesso	2019
"The Way It Was"	Backstreet Boys	2019
"Cause It's You"	Red Velvet	2022
