= First Time (Kygo and Ellie Goulding song) =

2017 single by Kygo and Ellie Goulding

Single by Kygo and Ellie Goulding

from the EP Stargazing
- Released: 28 April 2017
- Genre: EDM; tropical house
- Length: 3:13
- Label: Sony; Ultra
- Composers: Jeremy Chacon; Jonas Kalisch; Alexsej Vlasenko; Henrik Meinke; Julian Perretta
- Lyricists: Fanny Hultman; Ellie Goulding; Jenson Vaughan; Sara Hjellström
- Producers: Hitimpulse; Kygo

Kygo singles chronology
"It Ain't Me" (2017)	"First Time" (2017)	"Stargazing" (2017)

Ellie Goulding singles chronology
"Still Falling for You" (2016)	"First Time" (2017)	"Close to Me" (2018)

Music video
- "First Time" on YouTube

"First Time" is a song by the Norwegian DJ Kygo and the English singer Ellie Goulding. It was released on 28 April 2017, as the second single from Kygo's first EP, Stargazing (2017).

== Music video ==
On 12 May 2017, Kygo and Ellie Goulding released teasers for the upcoming music video on Instagram and Twitter.

The music video was released on 22 May 2017 on Kygo's YouTube channel. It was directed by American director Mathew Cullen. As of November 2020, the music video has over 102 million views.

== Track listing ==
Digital download
No.	Title	Length
1.	"First Time"	3:13

Digital download – Remixes
No.	Title	Length
1.	"First Time" (R3hab Remix)	2:35
2.	"First Time" (Gryffin Remix)	2:53

== Credits and personnel ==
Credits adapted from Tidal.

- Kygo – composer, producer
- Ellie Goulding – lyricist, vocalist
- Jeremy Chacon – composer
- Jonas Kalisch – composer
- Alexsej Vlasenko – composer
- Henrik Meinke – composer
- Fanny Hultman – lyricist
- Jenson Vaughan – lyricist
- Sara Hjellström – lyricist
- Hitimpulse – producer
- Serban Ghenea – mixing engineer
- Randy Merrill – mastering engineer
- John Hanes – engineer
- Joe Kearns – vocal producer

== Charts ==
=== Weekly charts ===
Chart (2017–18)	Peak position
Australia (ARIA)	29
Austria (Ö3 Austria Top 40)	23
Belgium (Ultratip Bubbling Under Flanders)	1
Belgium (Ultratip Bubbling Under Wallonia)	2
Canada Hot 100 (Billboard)	26
Czech Republic Airplay (ČNS IFPI)	6
Czech Republic Singles Digital (ČNS IFPI)	13
Denmark (Tracklisten)	18
Finland (Suomen virallinen lista)	13
France (SNEP)	34
Germany (GfK)	28
Hungary (Rádiós Top 40)	12
Hungary (Single Top 40)	36
Ireland (IRMA)	21
Italy (FIMI)	41
Lebanon (Lebanese Top 20)	7
Malaysia (RIM)	15
Netherlands (Dutch Top 40)	14
Netherlands (Mega Top 50)	38
Netherlands (Single Top 100)	22
New Zealand (Recorded Music NZ)	32
Norway (VG-lista)	3
Portugal (AFP)	30
Scottish Singles Sales (Official Charts)	10
Slovakia Airplay (ČNS IFPI)	60
Slovakia Singles Digital (ČNS IFPI)	13
Spain (Promusicae)	27
Sweden (Sverigetopplistan)	6
Switzerland (Schweizer Hitparade)	14
UK Singles (Official Charts)	34
US Billboard Hot 100	67
US Dance Club Songs (Billboard)	6
US Hot Dance/Electronic Songs (Billboard)	9

=== Year-end charts ===
Chart (2017)	Position
Hungary (Stream Top 40)	75
Netherlands (Dutch Top 40)	95
Sweden (Sverigetopplistan)	44
US Hot Dance/Electronic Songs (Billboard)	26
Chart (2018)	Position
Hungary (Rádiós Top 40)	86

== Certifications ==
Region	Certification	Certified units/sales
Australia (ARIA)	Platinum	70,000^{‡}
Austria (IFPI Austria)	Gold	15,000^{‡}
Canada (Music Canada)	2× Platinum	160,000^{‡}
Denmark (IFPI Danmark)	Platinum	90,000^{‡}
France (SNEP)	Gold	66,666^{‡}
Germany (BVMI)	Gold	200,000^{‡}
Italy (FIMI)	Platinum	50,000^{‡}
Mexico (AMPROFON)	Platinum	60,000^{‡}
New Zealand (RMNZ)	Platinum	30,000^{‡}
Poland (ZPAV)	Gold	25,000^{‡}
Spain (Promusicae)	Gold	30,000^{‡}
Switzerland (IFPI Switzerland)	Platinum	20,000^{‡}
United Kingdom (BPI)	Gold	400,000^{‡}
United States (RIAA)	Gold	500,000^{‡}
Streaming
Sweden (GLF)	3× Platinum	24,000,000^{†}
^{‡} Sales+streaming figures based on certification alone.^{†} Streaming-only figures based on certification alone.
