= Kygo =

Norwegian DJ and record producer (born 1991)

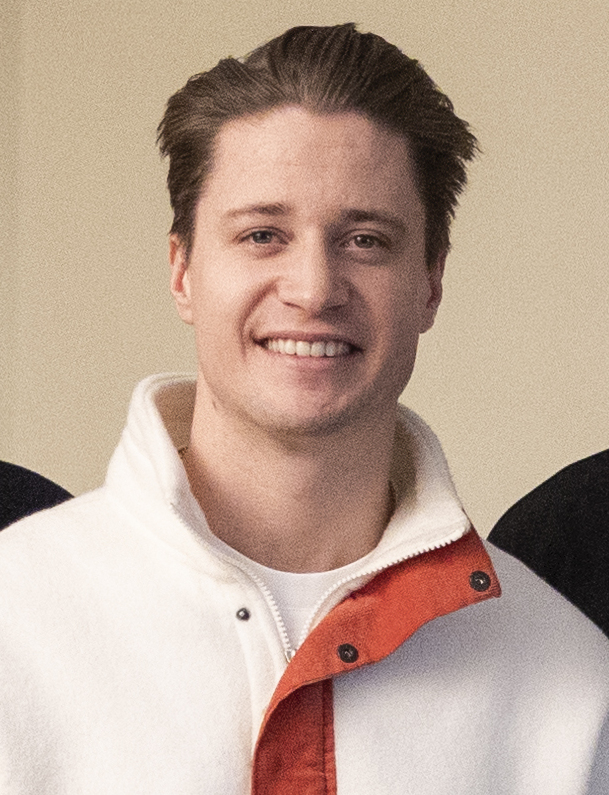
- Kygo in 2024

Background information
- Born: Kyrre Gørvell-Dahll; 11 September 1991 (age 35); Singapore
- Origin: Bergen, Norway
- Genres: Tropical house; dance-pop
- Occupations: DJ; record producer
- Instrument: Keyboards
- Years active: 2013–present
- Labels: Sony; Ultra; RCA
- Website: kygomusic.com

Kyrre Gørvell-Dahll (Norwegian pronunciation: [çʏrːə ˈɡøːrʋelː dɑːl]; born 11 September 1991), known professionally as Kygo (Norwegian: [ˈkỳːɡuː]), is a Singapore-born Norwegian DJ and record producer. He is regarded as one of the key figures that brought tropical house music to the commercial mainstream in the mid 2010s. He first received international attention with his December 2013 remix of the track "I See Fire" by Ed Sheeran and his December 2014 single "Firestone" (featuring Conrad Sewell). In late 2015, he reached one billion streams on Spotify faster than any other artist, and by June 2016, he had reached two billion streams.

He also experienced commercial success with the singles "Stole the Show" (2015), "Here for You" (2015), "Stay" (2015), "It Ain't Me" with Selena Gomez (2017), aremix of "Higher Love" (2019), a remix of "What's Love Got To Do With It" (2020), and two singles from his self-titled album, Kygo (2024), “Whatever" and “For Life”. His debut album, Cloud Nine, was released on 13 May 2016.

Kygo became the first house music producer to perform at an Olympics closing ceremony in August 2016 at the 2016 Rio Olympics. In March 2018, Billboard ranked Kygo third on its 2018 ranking of dance musicians titled Billboard Dance 100. The same year, he was ranked 32 on DJ Mag's top 100 DJs of the world, and in October 2019, he was ranked 42.

Kygo's stage name is a portmanteau derived from the first two letters of his first and last names (replacing ø with o). Kyrre got the idea for his stage name through a username he received in high school for the learning management system platform itslearning.

== Early life ==
Kyrre Gørvell-Dahll was born on 11 September 1991 in Singapore to Norwegian parents and raised in Bergen, Norway. He is the son of Kjersti Gjerde, a dentist in Norway, and Lars Gørvell-Dahll, who was working abroad in the maritime industry. He has an older stepbrother Mads, two older sisters Johanne and Jenny, and a younger half-brother Sondre. During his childhood, he lived and travelled with his family in Brazil, Japan, Kenya and Egypt.

Kygo started taking piano lessons at the age of six and considers himself more of a pianist than a disc jockey. He stopped when he was 15 or 16 and started producing music with Logic Studio and a MIDI keyboard while watching several tutorials on YouTube. When he decided to pursue music full-time, he was halfway through a degree in business and finance at Heriot-Watt University in Edinburgh, Scotland. He has cited Avicii as his main inspiration.

== Career ==
=== 2013–2014: Breakthrough ===
On 15 May 2013, Kygo released his first single called "Epsilon" on the Romanian record label Ensis Records. On 1 December 2014, he released the single "Firestone", featuring vocals from Conrad Sewell, which gained international recognition and debuted on several charts worldwide, being streamed 810 million times on YouTube and 1 billion times on Spotify, as of April 2024. After receiving over 80 million views on YouTube and SoundCloud, Kygo was contacted by Avicii and by Chris Martin of Coldplay to create a remix of the song "Midnight". He also supported Avicii at Findings Festival in Oslo, Norway, in 2014. On 19 September 2014, it was confirmed that Kygo was to replace Avicii at mainstage in Tomorrowland, due to Avicii's health concerns.

Version of the Kygo logo used since 2014

He was also featured in an interview for Billboard magazine, where he talked to writer Matt Medved about his remixes for musicians Diplo and Coldplay, and talked about his upcoming tour in North America. In July 2014, Kygo entered into a partnership with EDM lifestyle brand Electric Family to produce a collaboration bracelet for which one hundred per cent of the proceeds are donated to Médecins Sans Frontières. In the same month, he signed a record label deal with Sony International and Ultra Music.

=== 2015–2016: Cloud Nine and Kygo Life ===
In February 2015, Kygo's song "ID" was featured in the official trailer for Ultra Music Festival. The same track is also featured on FIFA 16, a popular association football video game by EA Sports. On 21 March 2015, he released his second single, titled "Stole the Show", featuring Parson James, which as of 2 January 2019, had 326 million views on YouTube and 1 billion streams on Spotify. On 31 July 2015, he released his third single, "Nothing Left", featuring Will Heard. "Nothing Left" reached number one on the Norwegian Singles Chart. In August 2015, Kygo was a featured headliner at Lollapalooza in Chicago, one of the biggest music festivals in the world. On 4 September 2015, he released his fourth single, titled "Here for You", featuring Ella Henderson.

Three months later, his fifth single, "Stay", produced with fellow Norwegian record producer William Larsen and featuring vocals by Maty Noyes, was released on 4 December 2015. In December 2015, Kygo became the fastest artist in history to reach one billion streams on Spotify.

On 12 February 2016, Kygo released a single with Dillon Francis and James Hersey called "Coming Over".

Kygo then announced that he was embarking on a worldwide tour to promote his album.

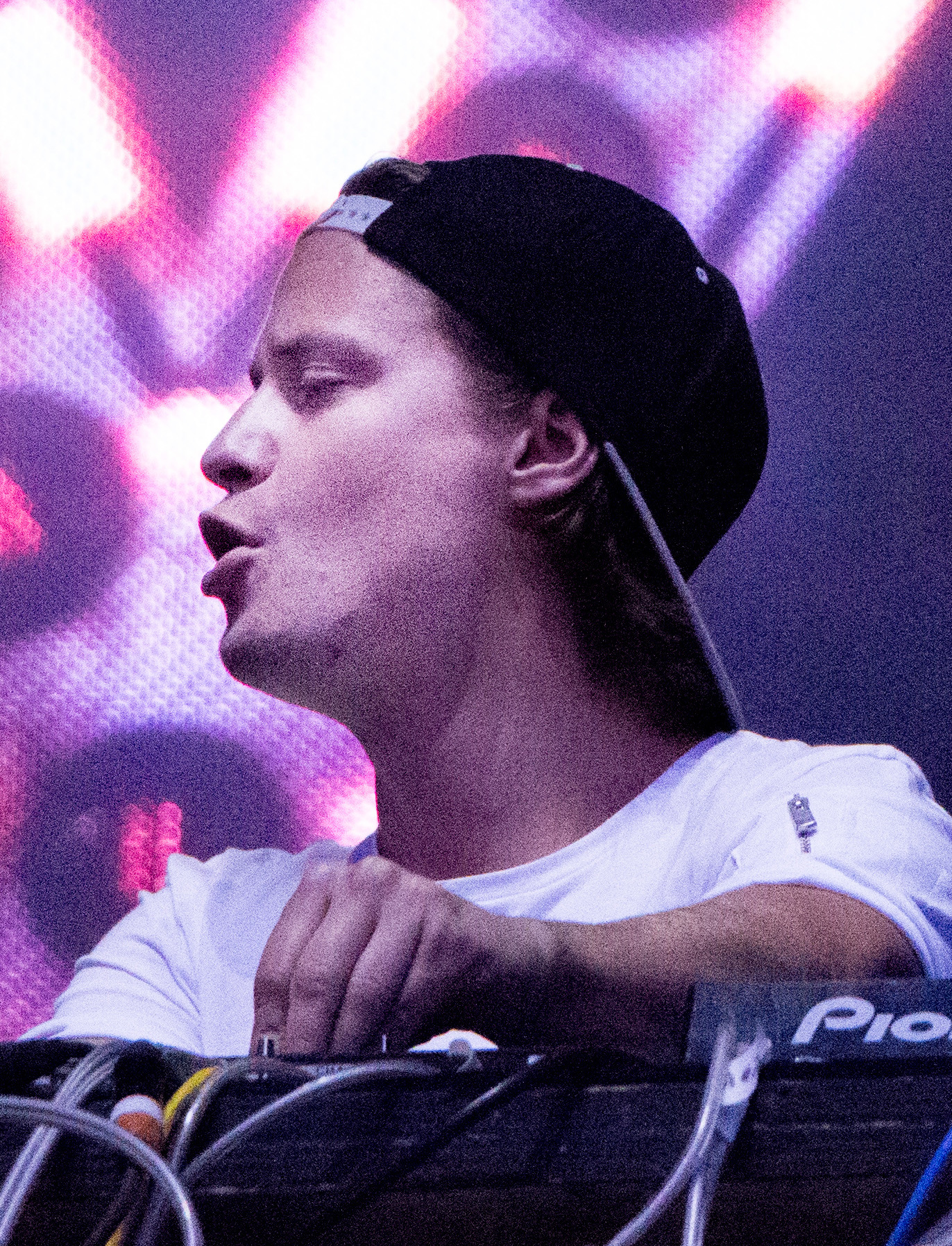
Kygo performing at the 2016 VELD Music Festival

In the beginning of March 2016, Kygo announced that his debut studio album was going to be released on 13 May 2016, under the title Cloud Nine. He also announced that he would be releasing three promotional singles, leading up to the release of the album. The first of these singles, which was released 18 March 2016, was entitled "Fragile", which features vocals and was collaborated with Labrinth. The second single came out on 1 April 2016 and was called "Raging", which features vocals from the Irish band Kodaline and was also co-written by James Bay. The third and last single was released on 22 April 2016 and was entitled "I'm In Love", featuring vocals from James Vincent McMorrow. Kygo's debut studio album was released on 13 May 2016.

Kygo launched a new lifestyle brand called Kygo Life on 17 August 2016 in Europe, the United States and Canada. The brand consists of two collections of high-fashion and relaxed wear, in addition to hardware such as headphones.

He performed "Carry Me" with American singer and songwriter Julia Michaels at the closing ceremony of the 2016 Summer Olympics on 21 August at the Maracanã Stadium in Rio de Janeiro, as part of a segment that promoted the new Olympic Channel service launching after the Games. His performance in the Olympics helped grow his popularity.

=== 2017–2018: Stargazing and Kids in Love ===
On 9 February 2017, Kygo posted a snippet of his collaboration with American singer Selena Gomez. They confirmed the single titled "It Ain't Me", via their social media accounts on 13 February. It was released on 16 February. The song is the lead single from Kygo's first EP, Stargazing. It the first song by Kygo to reach over a billion streams on Spotify. In addition to reaching number one in Croatia, Lebanon and Norway, the song attained top five peaks in Australia, Austria, Belgium, Canada, the Czech Republic, Denmark, Finland, France, Germany, Greece, Hungary, Ireland, the Netherlands, New Zealand, Poland, Portugal, Scotland, Slovakia, Sweden and Switzerland. It also reached the top 10 in Italy, Spain, the United Kingdom and the United States. On 28 April, Kygo released the second single from the EP, "First Time", with English singer Ellie Goulding. This track was certified gold in UK on 20 February 2020 selling over 400,000 copies.

On 19 October 2017, Kygo announced via Facebook that his second studio album is called Kids in Love, which was released on 3 November. On 20 October, he released the lead single and title track "Kids in Love", which features The Night Game. Shortly after releasing the album, Kygo announced the Kids in Love Tour. On 16 March 2018, Kygo released "Remind Me to Forget", a track featuring American singer Miguel, as the third single from the album, which streamed 400 million times on Spotify as of 2 January 2020, following "Stranger Things" featuring the American pop rock band OneRepublic. "Stranger Things" received a remix from Alan Walker.

=== 2018–2020: Golden Hour ===
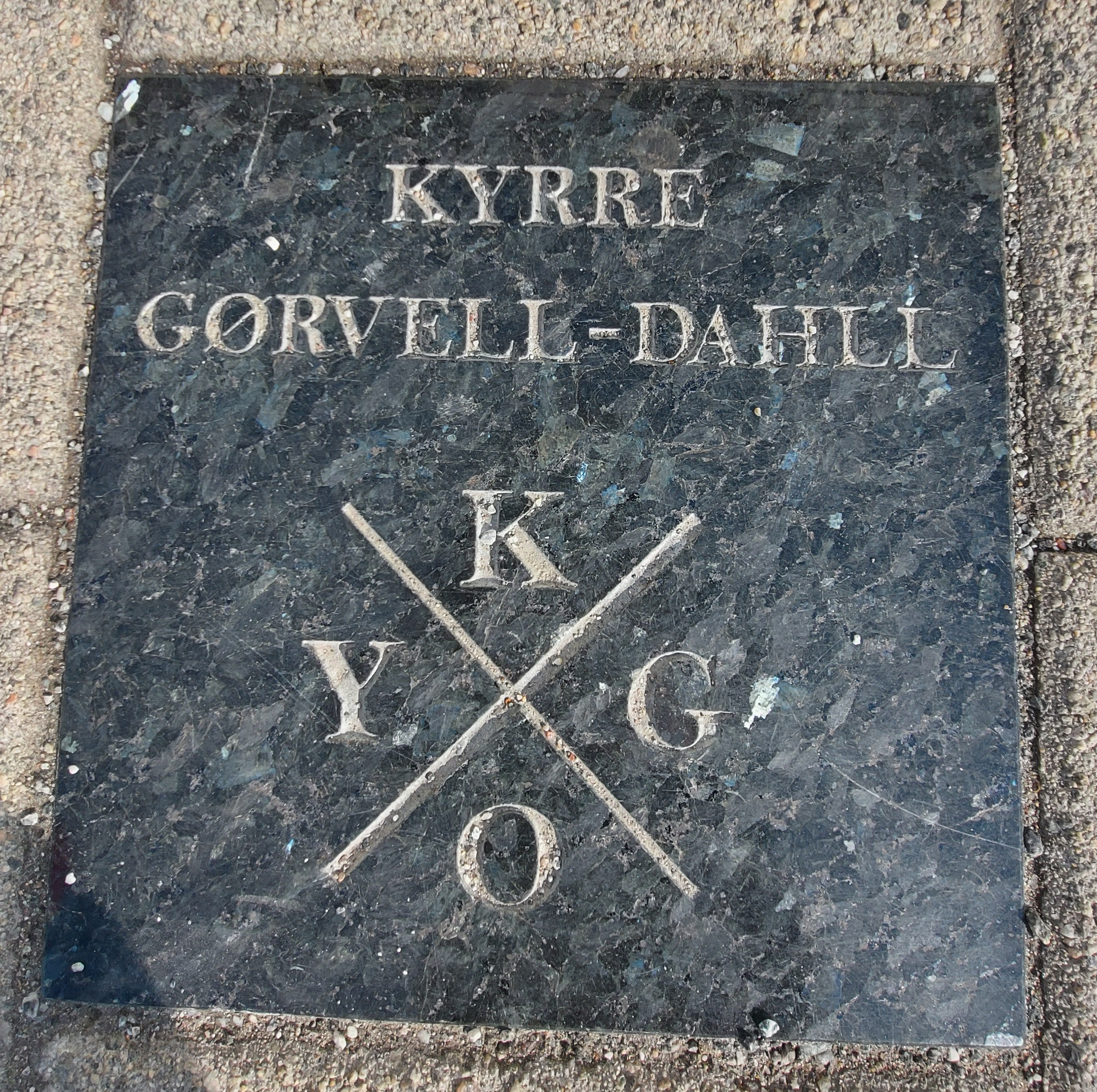
Kygo at the Bergen Walk of Fame.

In June 2018, Kygo announced a collaboration with Imagine Dragons titled "Born to Be Yours". The single was released on 11 June. On 21 September, Kygo debuted "Happy Now", a collaboration with Sandro Cavazza, during his set at the iHeartRadio Music Festival, held at the T-Mobile Arena. On 24 October, Kygo posted a clip from the single's music video on his social media account. The single was released on 26 October. In October 2018, Kygo and his manager, Myles Shear, partnered with Sony Music Entertainment and launched the Palm Tree Records label. Palm Tree Records aims to be a platform for up-and-coming artists.

"Think About You" featuring American singer Valerie Broussard was released as a single on 14 February 2019 and considered timed for Valentine's Day. "Carry On", a song with English singer Rita Ora, was released as a standalone single for the 2019 film Detective Pikachu. The song was released on 19 April 2019 through RCA Records. It has been streamed more than 174 million times on Spotify.

On 23 May 2019, Kygo released "Not OK" with Chelsea Cutler. On 14 June 2019, Kygo released his first Norwegian-language song, with Bergen rappers Store P and Lars Vaular called "Kem kan eg ringe". On 28 June, having been asked to by Whitney Houston's estate, he remixed Houston's cover version of Steve Winwood's song "Higher Love". On 21 August, "Higher Love" reached the No. 1 position on Billboard magazine's Dance Club Songs chart, making it Houston's highest-charting posthumous release to date. "Higher Love" has been streamed over 917 million times on Spotify as of April 2024. On 6 December, Kygo collaborated with The Chainsmokers on a track, named "Family".

After his fellow and frequent collaborator, Sandro Cavazza, sent him an unreleased Avicii track known as "Forever Yours" and with due consent from Avicii's family, Kygo completed the song while adding his signature tropical house elements. The track was released on 24 January 2020. On 23 March 2020, Kygo announced that he had completed his third album titled Golden Hour. He released the single "Like It Is", with Zara Larsson and Tyga, on 27 March 2020. On 2 April 2020, Kygo released "I'll Wait" with vocals by Sasha Sloan. The next day, a music video was released starring real-life American couple Rob Gronkowski and Camille Kostek containing personal footage of their life together. On 16 April 2020, Kygo collaborated with Moroccan-English singer Zak Abel on a track titled "Freedom".

On 11 May 2020, Kygo announced the track list for the Golden Hour album. On 15 May 2020, he released "Lose Somebody", with OneRepublic. Kygo released the next single from the album, "The Truth", featuring Valerie Broussard (with whom he previously collaborated on "Think About You"), on 22 May 2020. Golden Hour was released on 29 May 2020. Kygo also collaborates with Jay Sean on the track: "Out Of My Mind", but the song is not released.

On 11 July 2020, Kygo released a music video for the album track "Broken Glass" with German singer Kim Petras, and 6 days later, Kygo released a remix of Tina Turner's "What's Love Got to Do with It".

On 18 September 2020, Kygo released a remix of Donna Summer's "Hot Stuff".

=== 2021–2023: Thrill of the Chase ===
On 15 April 2021, Kygo released the track "Gone Are The Days" with singer James Gillespie.

On 13 August 2021, Kygo released a music video for the track "Love Me Now" featuring German singer Zoe Wees.

On 15 October 2021, Kygo released the single "Undeniable" featuring American pop-rock band X Ambassadors.

On 25 February 2022, Kygo released a song with DNCE called "Dancing Feet".

On 6 May 2022, Kygo released a single called "Freeze".

On 1 July 2022, Kygo released a single with Dean Lewis called "Never Really Loved Me".

On 8 July 2022, Kygo released another single with Dean Lewis called "Lost Without You".

On 9 September 2022, Kygo released a single with Gryffin and Calum Scott called "Woke Up In Love".

On 11 November 2022, Kygo released his fourth album, Thrill of the Chase as a surprise album.

On 31 March 2023, Kygo released a remix of the song "Say Say Say" by Paul McCartney and Michael Jackson.

=== 2024–2025: Kygo ===
On 19 January 2024, Kygo released a song with Ava Max called "Whatever" which interpolates "Whenever, Wherever" by Shakira.

On 19 April, he released "For Life" with Zak Abel and Nile Rodgers, which interpolates "Lady (Hear Me Tonight)" by Modjo. After this release, Kygo announced his Kygo World Tour on social media, which is scheduled for late 2024.

On 30 May 2024, he announced a new album, simply called Kygo, which was released on 21 June 2024 as he commemorated 10 years of his career. A day later, he released "Without You", in collaboration with singer-songwriter Hayla. On 14 June 2024, Kygo released "Me Before You" with singer-songwriter Plested, as the fourth single from Kygo. The song was already played by him in some shows before its release.

On 21 June 2024, Kygo released KYGO, which contains 18 tracks and runs for 1 hour and 4 minutes. The album peaked No.1 in Norway and No.2 on the Billboard Dance/Electronic Charts.

On 27 September, during his KYGO World Tour, he released "Stars Will Align" with Imagine Dragons.

On 15 November, he released the song "Hold On Me" with Sandro Cavazza.

On 24 January 2025, he released "Chasing Paradise" with OneRepublic.

On 2 May, he released "Can't Get Enough" with Victoria Nadine.

=== 2026–present: TBD ===
On 20 February, he released "Save My Love" with Khalid and Gryffin, whilst previously completely wiping his Instagram page.

On 10 April, he released "That's When You Know" with Carter Faith.

On 22 May, he released "Heaven On Your Mind" with Dan Tyminski.

In July 2026, after the Norway national football team, led by star Erling Haaland, advanced to the FIFA World Cup quarter-finals, Kygo remixed "Kygo Jo", a rap song made in 2016 by Haaland (as "Lyng") with his then Norway under-17 international football teammates Erik Botheim and Erik Tobias Sandberg, under the name "Flow Kingz", and named as a reference to Kygo. Kygo's remix reached the top of the Spotify charts in Norway just a few days later.

On 10 July, he released "Take Me Back" with Max McNown.

On 16 October, he released "Before You Know It" with Ava Max, marking the second collaboration between Kygo and Ava Max following "Whatever".

== Personal life ==
As of May 2025, Kygo was dating Victoria Nadine, a Norwegian musician. Kygo is a supporter of British football club Manchester United, and his favourite player was Juan Mata. He also supports his local team, SK Brann. He is also a fan of Formula One and performed a concert at the 2019 Bahrain Grand Prix. He also performed at the 2021 Mexico City Grand Prix and the inaugural 2022 Miami Grand Prix.

== Philanthropy ==
In June 2016, NRK reported that Kygo is "giving 50 000 USD [...] of the profits [of his sold-out festival on 20 August]" to Ugandan LGBT advocate Frank Mugisha; Kygo was quoted: "Everyone should be permitted to live with one's sexual orientation. That is not the situation in Uganda and quite a few other countries across the world".

== Discography ==
Studio albums

- Cloud Nine (2016)
- Kids in Love (2017)
- Golden Hour (2020)
- Thrill of the Chase (2022)
- Kygo (2024)

== Filmography ==
Film

Year	Title	Role	Running time	Note	Ref.
2017	Stole the Show	Himself	51 min (0 hr, 51 min)	Documentary by Apple Music	

Television

Year	Title	Role	No. of episodes	Note	Ref.
2015	Bring On the Night	Himself	2 (season 1)	Docuseries by VGTV	
2015	Nøkkelen til suksess	Himself	1 (season 1, episode 4)	Docuseries by NRK	

== Tour ==
- Endless Summer Tour (2014)
- Cloud Nine Tour (2016)
- Kids in Love Tour (2018)
- KYGO World Tour (2024)

== Awards and nominations ==
Year	Organization	Award	Work	Result	Ref.
2015	YouTube Music Awards	YouTube Music Video Award	"Stole the Show"	Won	
2015	MTV Europe Music Awards	Best Norwegian Act	Himself	Nominated	
2016	International Dance Music Awards by Winter Music Conference	Best Break-Through DJ	Himself	Won	
2016	International Dance Music Awards by Winter Music Conference	Best Break-Through Artist (Solo)	Himself	Won	
2016	International Dance Music Awards by Winter Music Conference	Best Chillout/Lounge Track	"Stole the Show"	Won	
2016	2016 Spellemannprisen	Spellemann of the Year	Himself	Won	
2016	2016 Spellemannprisen	Newcomer of the Year & Gramo Scholarship	Himself	Nominated	
2016	2016 Spellemannprisen	Music Video of the Year	"Stole the Show"	Nominated	
2016	2016 Spellemannprisen	Song of the Year	"Stole the Show"	Won	
2016	2016 Spellemannprisen	Song of the Year	"Firestone"	Nominated	
2016	Electronic Music Awards & Foundation * Still pending postponed award show	Best New Artist	Himself	Nominated	
2016	Electronic Music Awards & Foundation * Still pending postponed award show	Single of the Year	"Stole the Show"	Nominated	
2016	Spellemannprisen and Music Norway	Export Award	Himself	Won	
2016	MTV Europe Music Awards	Best Norwegian Act	Himself	Nominated	
2016	NRJ Music Awards	DJ de l'année (DJ of the Year)	Himself	Nominated	
2017	2017 Spellemannprisen	Popsolist (Pop Solo Artist)	Cloud Nine	Nominated	
2017	2017 Spellemannprisen	Song of the Year	"Stay"	Nominated	
2017	WDM Radio Awards	Best New Talent	Himself	Nominated	
2017	Billboard Music Awards	Top Dance/Electronic Album	Cloud Nine	Nominated	
2017	Teen Choice Awards	Choice Collaboration	"It Ain't Me" (shared with Selena Gomez)	Nominated	
2017	Teen Choice Awards	Choice Electronic/Dance Song	"It Ain't Me" (shared with Selena Gomez)	Nominated	
2017	MTV Video Music Awards	Best Dance Video	"It Ain't Me" (shared with Selena Gomez)	Nominated	
2017	Nickelodeon Colombia Kids' Choice Awards	Colaboración Favorita (Favorite Collaboration)	"It Ain't Me" (shared with Selena Gomez)	Nominated	
2017	Nickelodeon Mexico Kids' Choice Awards	Colaboración Favorita (Favorite Collaboration)	"It Ain't Me" (shared with Selena Gomez)	Nominated	
2017	Nickelodeon Argentina Kids' Choice Awards	Colaboración Favorita (Favorite Collaboration)	"It Ain't Me" (shared with Selena Gomez)	Nominated	
2017	LOS40 Music Awards	International Artist of the Year	Himself	Nominated	
2017	LOS40 Music Awards	Best International Video	"It Ain't Me" (shared with Selena Gomez)	Won	
2017	MTV Europe Music Awards	Best Norwegian Act	Himself	Nominated	
2017	iHeartRadio Titanium Awards	1 Billion Total Audience Spins on iHeartRadio Stations	"It Ain't Me" (shared with Selena Gomez)	Won	
2018	2018 Spellemannprisen	Song of the Year	"It Ain't Me" (shared with Selena Gomez)	Nominated	
2018	WDM Radio Awards	Best Global Track	"It Ain't Me" (shared with Selena Gomez)	Nominated	
2018	WDM Radio Awards	Best Deep House DJ	Himself	Nominated	
2018	Billboard Music Awards	Top Dance/Electronic Artist	Himself	Nominated	
2018	Billboard Music Awards	Top Dance/Electronic Album	Stargazing	Nominated	
2018	Billboard Music Awards	Top Dance/Electronic Song	"It Ain't Me" (shared with Selena Gomez)	Nominated	
2018	International Dance Music Awards by Winter Music Conference	Best Live Act	Himself	Won	
2018	MTV Europe Music Awards	Best Norwegian Act	Himself	Nominated	
2019	2019 Spellemannprisen	Song of the Year	"Remind Me to Forget" (shared with Miguel)	Nominated	
2019	iHeartRadio Music Awards	Dance Song of the Year	"Remind Me to Forget" (shared with Miguel)	Nominated	
2019	iHeartRadio Music Awards	Dance Artist of the Year	Himself	Nominated	
2019	Billboard Music Awards	Top Dance/Electronic Artist	Himself	Nominated	
2019	Billboard Music Awards	Top Dance/Electronic Album	Kids in Love	Nominated	
2019	P3 Gull '19	P3 Prize	Himself	Honoree	
2020	2020 Spellemannprisen	Song of the Year	"Kem kan eg ringe" (shared with Store P and Lars Vaular)	Nominated	
2021	2021 Spellemannprisen	Song of the Year	"Lose Somebody" (shared with OneRepublic)	Nominated	
2024	P3 Gull '24	Song of the Year	"Whatever" (shared with Ava Max)	Nominated	
2025	2025 Spellemannprisen	Song of the Year	"Whatever" (shared with Ava Max)	Won	

=== DJ Magazine Top 100 DJ ===
Year	Position	Notes	Ref.
2015	33	New Entry	
2016	26	Up 7	
2017	24	Up 2	
2018	32	Down 8	
2019	52	Down 20	
2020	28	Up 24	
2021	48	Down 20	
2022	–	Down	
