= Kids in Love (song) =

Single by Kygo featuring the Night Game

from the album Kids in Love
- Released: 20 October 2017
- Genre: Pop rock
- Length: 4:23
- Label: Sony; Ultra
- Composers: Kyrre Gørvell-Dahll; Martin Johnson; Linda Karlsson; Pete Townshend; Sonny Gustafsson
- Lyricists: Linda Karlsson; Sonny Gustafsson; Martin Johnson; Kyle Puccia
- Producer: Kygo

Kygo singles chronology
"Stargazing" (2017)	"Kids in Love" (2017)	"Stranger Things" (2018)

The Night Game singles chronology
"Once in a Lifetime" (2017)	"Kids in Love" (2017)	"Bad Girls Don’t Cry" (2018)

"Kids in Love" is a song by Norwegian DJ and record producer Kygo, featuring American rock band the Night Game and uncredited vocals from Maja Francis. It was composed and produced by Kygo, with additional composition from Pete Townshend, Martin Johnson, Linda Karlsson and Sonny Gustafsson, and lyrics written by the latter three as well as Kyle Puccia. The song was released via Sony Music and Ultra Music on 20 October 2017, as the lead single from Kygo's second studio album of the same name.

== Background ==
The song was first played at Ultra Music Festival in Miami in March 2017. Starting from 11 October 2017, Kygo's team invited eleven celebrities, including Vin Diesel, The Chainsmokers, Ryan Tedder, Josephine Skriver, Ansel Elgort, Rickie Fowler, Rob Gronkowski, Logan Paul, Adrian Grenier, Jay Alvarrez and Juan Mata, to tell the story of their first love on social media, as a promotion of the single and album.

== Critical reception ==
Music critics lauded "Kids in Love" for its production, lyrics and catchiness. Kat Bein of Billboard praised the pop rock song, describing it as "big, bold and bright as the sun". Matthew Meadow of Your EDM opined that "the song is just as good as we remember it pumping out over the Miami crowd".

== Track listing ==
Digital download
No.	Title	Length
1.	"Kids in Love" (featuring the Night Game)	4:23

Digital download – remix
No.	Title	Length
1.	"Kids in Love" (with Jayli) (remix)	3:30

Digital download – The Night Game version
No.	Title	Length
1.	"Kids in Love"	4:14

== Credits and personnel ==
Credits adapted from Tidal.

- Kygo – composition, production
- Martin Johnson – composition, lyrics, vocals
- Linda Karlsson – composition, lyrics
- Pete Townshend – composition
- Sonny Gustafsson – composition, lyrics
- Kyle Puccia – lyrics
- Serban Ghenea – mixing engineering
- John Hanes – mixing engineering
- Sören von Malmborg – mastering engineering
- Maja Francis – vocals
- David Rodriguez – recording engineering

== Charts ==
Chart (2017)	Peak position
Australia (ARIA)	94
Austria (Ö3 Austria Top 40)	52
Belgium (Ultratip Bubbling Under Flanders)	10
Belgium (Ultratip Bubbling Under Wallonia)	26
Canada Hot 100 (Billboard)	73
Czech Republic Singles Digital (ČNS IFPI)	42
Germany (GfK)	90
Netherlands (Dutch Top 40)	29
Mexico Airplay (Billboard)	42
Norway (VG-lista)	8
Portugal (AFP)	83
Slovakia Singles Digital (ČNS IFPI)	45
Sweden (Sverigetopplistan)	19
Switzerland (Schweizer Hitparade)	33
UK Singles (Official Charts)	99
US Bubbling Under Hot 100 (Billboard)	22
US Hot Dance/Electronic Songs (Billboard)	10

== Certifications ==
Region	Certification	Certified units/sales
Sweden (GLF)	Platinum	40,000^{‡}
^{‡} Sales+streaming figures based on certification alone.

== Release history ==
Region	Date	Format	Version	Label	Ref.
Various	20 October 2017	Digital download	Original	Sony; Ultra	
Various	30 January 2018	Digital download	Remix	Sony; Ultra	
Various	2 February 2018	Digital download	The Night Game version	Interscope; Vertigo; Capitol	
