= Dancing Feet (song) =

2022 single by Kygo featuring DNCE

Single by Kygo featuring DNCE

from the album Thrill of the Chase
- Released: 25 February 2022
- Length: 3:35
- Label: RCA
- Songwriter(s): Kyrre Gørvell-Dahll; David Stewart; Rami Yacoub; Jessica Agombar
- Producer(s): Kygo; Stewart

Kygo singles chronology
"Undeniable" (2021)	"Dancing Feet" (2022)	"Freeze" (2022)

DNCE singles chronology
"Hands Up" (2018)	"Dancing Feet" (2022)	"Move" (2022)

Music video
- "Dancing Feet" on YouTube

"Dancing Feet" is a song by Norwegian record producer and DJ Kygo, featuring a guest appearance from American band DNCE. It was released on 25 February 2022 through RCA Records as the fourth single from Kygo's fourth studio album, Thrill of the Chase (2022). The production was handled by Kygo and David Stewart and the vocals were solely handled by DNCE's lead singer, Joe Jonas, and the producers wrote the song alongside Rami Yacoub and Jess Agombar. It also serves as DNCE's comeback single since their return after taking a three-year-long hiatus in 2019.

== Background and promotion ==
Joe Jonas had been teasing "Dancing Feet" on the video-sharing app TikTok for several weeks prior to its release, with several video teasers and videos with the song in the background, starting in mid-January 2022.

On 7 February 2022, DNCE announced their return as a band after a hiatus that lasted about three years since 2018 ended, and Jonas was interviewed by Rolling Stone on the same day, in which he said of the song: "It's really happy. It's that feeling of not really giving a fuck and enjoying life to the fullest". The song has been described as "a perfect reintroduction, a crisp Eighties-inspired bop primed for all your dance-floor needs" and "fit in perfectly with the material already written for the band's return". Four days later, Kygo was interviewed by people People, in which he shared his thoughts about collaborating with Jonas on the song and DNCE's reunion: "I only met Joe briefly at a festival a couple of years ago, but he's a super nice guy" and "Joe recorded vocals and it just sounded amazing", adding that "I feel like we're all just very excited about this song, and obviously it's very cool to be part of their comeback". On 12 February 2022, Kygo brought DNCE out for his performance at the Sports Illustrated The Party x Palm Tree Crew in Century Park for the Super Bowl LVI weekend show that day, in which they collectively performed the song live for the first time. The official music video was also shot during that week. Kygo has also been reported to be working with DNCE on the band's upcoming second studio album.

== Composition and lyrics ==
"Dancing Feet" is set in the key of C major. It sees Jonas sing "over a characteristically breezy Kygo melody", especially on the song's chorus: "'Cause these dancing feet don't cry to the rhythm, they cry for you / And every Saturday night that you ain't here, my tears are blue / And these blinding lights, they shine so bright like we're on the moon / But I don't wanna dancе another beat, no, unless it's with you".

== Music video ==
The official music video for "Dancing Feet", directed by Johannes Lovund, premiered on 28 February 2022, coinciding with the three-year-anniversary of the reunion of Jonas' other band, the Jonas Brothers. It was originally set to be released alongside the song three days before, but was pushed back in respect of the Russian invasion of Ukraine going on at the time. It was shot in Miami, Florida. The video sees Kygo and the three DNCE members (Jonas, Jack Lawless, and JinJoo Lee) at the Palm Tree Resort, imitating Miami Vice, as they do favors and run errands for the rich people in the area, such as parking their cars and playing tennis with them, and then give the music for a party. The next day, after working hard, they sneak into a nightclub and dance on a light-up floor.

== Credits and personnel ==
- Kygo – production, songwriting
- DNCE
  - Joe Jonas – vocals
  - Jack Lawless – drums
  - JinJoo Lee – guitar
- David Stewart – production, songwriting, vocal production
- Rami Yacoub – songwriting
- Jess Agombar – songwriting
- Sean Lascelles – miscellaneous production
- Serban Ghenea – mixing
- Randy Merrill – mastering
- John Hanes – engineering

== Charts ==
=== Weekly charts ===
Weekly chart performance for "Dancing Feet"
Chart (2022)	Peak position
Belgium (Ultratop 50 Flanders)	35
Belgium (Ultratop 50 Wallonia)	22
Canada (Canadian Hot 100)	68
Canada CHR/Top 40 (Billboard)	27
Canada Hot AC (Billboard)	26
Czech Republic (Rádio – Top 100)	7
Global 200 (Billboard)	165
Hungary (Rádiós Top 40)	8
Netherlands (Dutch Top 40)	25
Netherlands (Single Top 100)	53
New Zealand Hot Singles (RMNZ)	3
Norway (VG-lista)	8
Russia Airplay (TopHit)	9
Slovakia (Rádio Top 100)	7
Sweden (Sverigetopplistan)	33
Switzerland (Schweizer Hitparade)	60
UK Singles Downloads (OCC)	38
US Adult Pop Airplay (Billboard)	23
US Bubbling Under Hot 100 (Billboard)	16
US Hot Dance/Electronic Songs (Billboard)	6
US Pop Airplay (Billboard)	28

=== Monthly charts ===
Monthly chart performance for "Dancing Feet"
Chart (2022)	Peak position
Russia Airplay (TopHit)	14

=== Year-end charts ===
Year-end chart performance for "Dancing Feet"
Chart (2022)	Position
Belgium (Ultratop 50 Flanders)	133
Belgium (Ultratop 50 Wallonia)	121
Hungary (Rádiós Top 40)	63
Netherlands (Dutch Top 40)	97
Russia Airplay (TopHit)	39
US Hot Dance/Electronic Songs (Billboard)	28

== Certifications ==
Certifications for "Dancing Feet"
Region	Certification	Certified units/sales
Austria (IFPI Austria)	Gold	15,000^{‡}
Canada (Music Canada)	Gold	40,000^{‡}
Hungary (MAHASZ)	Platinum	4,000^{‡}
Streaming
Sweden (GLF)	Gold	4,000,000^{†}
^{‡} Sales+streaming figures based on certification alone.^{†} Streaming-only figures based on certification alone.

== Release history ==
Release history for "Dancing Feet"
Region	Date	Format	Label	Ref.
Various	25 February 2022	Digital download; streaming	RCA Records	
United States	28 February 2022	Adult contemporary radio	RCA Records	
United States	1 March 2022	Contemporary hit radio	RCA Records	
Italy	11 March 2022	Contemporary hit radio	Sony	
