= Itslearning =

Norwegian digital learning management system

itslearning
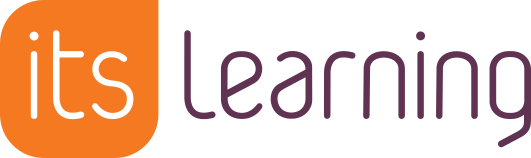
- Type: Stock company
- Industry: Educational
- Genre: Learning management system
- Founded: 1999 in Bergen, Norway
- Headquarters: Bergen, Norway
- Area served: Worldwide
- Key people: Kirsi Harra-Vauhkonen (CEO)
- Parent: Sanoma
- Website: itslearning.com

Itslearning (stylized itslearning) is a digital learning management system (LMS) developed by Norwegian company Itslearning AS. Designed for both K–12 and higher education, the itslearning LMS allows teachers to deliver learning materials to students, including assessments, Office 365 documents, and other educational content.

== History ==
The itslearning LMS was created by a group of students at Bergen University College in 1998 as a project on the topic of "virtual classrooms". A council of educators inquired about the platform's feasibility and once awarded a grant by the college, itslearning was established the following year. Bergen University College became the system's first user. The company was first established as "it:solutions".

In 2004, Arne Bergby became CEO of itslearning. An office in the United States was opened in 2009 in Massachusetts. itslearning acquired SkoleIntra in 2013 and Fronter in 2015. In 2014, 40% of the company was sold to the Swedish private equity fund EQT. At the time, the company was valued at 600 million NOK ($73 million).

In December 2019, itslearning was acquired by Sanoma Group, a European learning and media company in Helsinki.
