= It Ain't Me =

2017 single by Kygo and Selena Gomez

Single by Kygo and Selena Gomez

from the EP Stargazing
- Released: 16 February 2017
- Recorded: 2016
- Genre: EDM; tropical house; dance-folk; pop; dance-pop; electropop
- Length: 3:40
- Label: Interscope; Sony; Ultra
- Songwriters: Kyrre Gørvell-Dahll; Brian Lee; Ali Tamposi; Selena Gomez; Andrew Watt
- Producers: Kygo; Andrew Watt

Kygo singles chronology
"Carry Me" (2016)	"It Ain't Me" (2017)	"First Time" (2017)

Selena Gomez singles chronology
"Trust Nobody" (2016)	"It Ain't Me" (2017)	"Bad Liar" (2017)

Music video
- "It Ain't Me" on YouTube

"It Ain't Me" is a song by Norwegian DJ Kygo and American singer Selena Gomez. It was released by Interscope Records, Sony and Ultra on 16 February 2017 as the lead single from Kygo's debut extended play Stargazing (2017) and appears as an international bonus track on Gomez's third studio album, Rare (2020). The song was written by Kygo, Gomez, Brian Lee, Ali Tamposi, and Andrew Watt and produced by Kygo, Watt and Louis Bell. An EDM, dance-pop, electropop and tropical house song, "It Ain't Me" comprises an acoustic guitar line, and a build-drop arrangement in its chorus featuring pulsing piano notes, bass, synthesizers, finger-snap claps and pan flute melodies. Gomez sings the track in a husky tone, while in the chorus her vocals are reduced to recurring syllables. The lyrics narrate a past relationship ruined by alcoholism.

In addition to reaching number one in Croatia, Lebanon, and Norway, the song attained top five peaks in Australia, Austria, Belgium, Canada, the Czech Republic, Denmark, Finland, France, Germany, Greece, Hungary, Ireland, Malaysia, the Netherlands, New Zealand, Poland, Portugal, Scotland, Slovakia, Sweden and Switzerland. It also reached the top 10 in Italy, Spain, the United Kingdom and the United States. The song was remixed as an Amapiano song in 2021 which went viral on TikTok.

== Writing and recording ==
The lyrics to "It Ain't Me" were written by Andrew Watt, Brian Lee and Ali Tamposi. With Watt previously working with Kygo, the DJ's manager Myles Shear contacted Watt for a session with Kygo which Watt also facilitated for Lee and Tamposi. During their session for "It Ain't Me", they initially found the track very poor, but were trying to salvage it. Kygo and Shear suggested that they continue working on the song. After Kygo and Shear had left, Tamposi told Watt and Lee to play guitar and "Fleetwood Mac it", spawning a 45-minute jam session as well as the demo of "It Ain't Me", a simple acoustic guitar recording with Tamposi on vocals.

Watt, Lee and Tamposi then asked Kygo to return to their studio to hear "It Ain't Me" for a second time. Tamposi recalled, "When they pushed the space bar to play the song, [Kygo] went from this very sweet, polite, charming young man to this super-human producer guy. I was watching his eyes go back, left and right, just mapping out how he envisioned the production of the song. He was extremely excited". Lee and Tamposi then left for Kygo and Watt to work on the production where they followed the melodies and message of the demo. According to Tamposi, the producers brought the song to life.

The three songwriters would usually spend several months pitching their songs to different singers, but with "It Ain't Me" Gomez heard it about a month afterward and recorded it a few days later. Tamposi was called back for the vocal sessions with Gomez where they shared a similar emotional vision for "It Ain't Me", basing it on their own personal experiences. Recalling the sessions, Tamposi said she was impressed with Gomez's involvement and the ideas she came up with for the song.

== Music and lyrics ==
"It Ain't Me" is an EDM, dance-pop, electropop and tropical house song. According to the official sheet music at Musicnotes.com, "It Ain't Me" is composed in the key of A minor and is set in the time signature of alla breve at a tempo of 100 beats per minute. Gomez's vocal range spans from the low note of G_{3} to the high note of E_{5}, while the music follows the chord progression of Am–C–F–C–F–C–G. Later in the song, the piano plays in a chord progression of: Am–C–G–F–Am–C–G. The song carries a calm tone and a drop common in tropical house music, but is complemented by an equal measure of electronic and pop rock elements. The track starts with a folk-like acoustic guitar riff. It is followed immediately by Gomez singing the first verse in a husky tone. As the song develops, a steady bass and synthesizers are heard. The production is subtle and varied with finger snaps sometimes being louder than the kick drum, and the guitar riff and piano notes alternating in and out. In the chorus, Gomez is accompanied by background vocals that pertain to the sound of a choir.

"It Ain't Me"
A 22-second sample of "It Ain't Me" featuring the chorus to the start of the drop which Gomez sings accompanied by backing vocals, piano notes, a guitar riff, and vocal effects.

The chorus has a new melodic arrangement and a crescendo. It is ensued by chord-buoyed builds and drops comprising finger snaps and pan flute melodies. The same synthesizers from the verses are repeated with a sidechained piano in the background. In the drop Kygo introduces sidechained vocal chops of Gomez singing syllables and are accompanied by percussion instruments. "It Ain't Me" is a breakup song with a theme of nostalgia. The lyrics are about standing up for yourself in the face of a toxic relationship. Gomez narrates the regret of a previous relationship ruined by her former lover's habits of drinking and partying too often. The lyrics address alcoholism. Tamposi explained that "It Ain't Me" is about a woman finding the strength to walk away from a toxic relationship despite the pressure she receives from society to stand by her man. Although the lyrics are sombre, the song has a distinctly uplifting and empowering sound.

In Vietnam, the song "LayLaLay" composed by singer Jack was plagiarized from "It Ain't Me".

== Release ==
In early February 2017, "It Ain't Me" was registered on the American Society of Composers, Authors and Publishers (ASCAP) database. Gomez first teased the single with two Instagram stories on 3 February 2017. The first teaser showed a half-profile of the singer with a black "X" over her mouth as a 10-second snippet plays with the lyrics, "I had a dream / we were back to 17 / summer nights and The Libertines / never growing up," while the second teaser was a snippet of the song's beat. Gomez later revealed the single's cover art and release date on Instagram on 13 February 2017, and shared three teasers of the song on Snapchat the following day. "It Ain't Me" was released for digital download by Interscope, Sony and Ultra Music on 17 February 2017 as the first single from Kygo's upcoming second studio album. Interscope was the primary label since it is Gomez's label. A remix of the song featuring actor Vin Diesel was released on Facebook on 18 February 2017. "It Ain't Me" was sent to contemporary hit radio in the US on 28 February 2017.

== Critical reception ==
"It Ain't Me" received positive reviews from music critics. Matt Medved of Billboard regarded it as one of Gomez's most mature-sounding releases and appreciated Kygo's usage of her vocals, adding that the song showed both collaborators' "best sides". Similarly, Alexia Hernandez of Entertainment Weekly deemed it "perhaps her most mature tune to date". In The New York Times, Jon Pareles described the song as a "righteous kiss-off", commending its subtle and varied production. Pedro Pincay of Vibe magazine said Kygo and Gomez "cooked up something special". Kat Bein of Billboard ranked "It Ain't Me" atop her list of ten best Kygo songs, writing that Gomez's "powerful and strong" vocals took "Kygo's collaborative vocal game to a whole new level" and the chorus arrangement brought "a certain edginess new to Kygo's catalogue", concluding that the song showed growth and "maybe heralds a new era of Kygo's sound". In a negative review, Pitchfork described it as "yet another exercise in EDM guys reducing female vocalists to anonymities," deeming it inferior to Gomez's follow-up single "Bad Liar".

== Chart performance ==
In the US, "It Ain't Me" debuted at number 93 on the Billboard Hot 100, selling 19,000 copies and accumulating 1.7 million streams in its first day. Following its first full week of tracking, the song climbed to number 12, aided by sales of 67,000 copies, 15.5 million streams and a 19 million airplay audience. "It Ain't Me" became Kygo's highest-charting single in the US, surpassing the number 92 peak of his 2014 single "Firestone", and marked Gomez's seventh top 10 entry in less than four years, continuing her "chart hot streak" according to Gary Trust of Billboard magazine. As of May 2017, the song has sold 484,000 copies in the United States.

"It Ain't Me" debuted at number nine on the UK Singles Chart with first-week sales of 31,380 units, giving Kygo his second top 10 single (after "Firestone") in the UK and Gomez her third (after "Naturally" and "Come & Get It"). It rose to number seven in its second week, selling 33,466 units. In Australia, "It Ain't Me" debuted at number nine on the ARIA Singles Chart becoming both Kygo and Gomez's first top 10 debut and highest-charting single in the country, as well as Kygo's second top 10 entry after "Firestone" and Gomez's third following "Good for You" and "We Don't Talk Anymore".

== Music video ==
A music video, directed by Philip R. Lopez, was released on 24 April 2017 on Kygo's official Vevo channel. The video revolves around a young couple involved in a motorcycle crash. The boyfriend is rendered comatose. The video depicts the boyfriend's unconscious state, with the girlfriend dancing and singing by his bedside at the hospital, until he opens his eyes in the final seconds of the video.

The music video was shot in High Bridge, New Jersey. Neither Kygo nor Gomez appear in the video.

== Usage in media ==
The song is featured in tenth episode of the television series The Bold Type.

== Track listing ==
- Digital download
1. "It Ain't Me" – 3:40
- Digital download – Tiësto's AFTR:HRS Remix
1. "It Ain't Me" (Tiësto's AFTR:HRS Remix) – 3:12

== Credits and personnel ==
Credits adapted from Tidal.

- Kygo – songwriter, producer
- Selena Gomez – vocals, songwriter
- Brian Lee – songwriter, background vocals
- Ali Tamposi – songwriter, background vocals
- Andrew Watt – producer, songwriter, vocal producer, guitar, background vocals
- Louis Bell – producer, vocal producer
- David Rodríguez – recording engineer
- Tom Coyne – mastering engineer
- Serban Ghenea – mixing engineer
- Benjamin Rice – vocal producer

== Charts ==
=== Weekly charts ===
Chart (2017–2018)	Peak position
Australia (ARIA)	4
Austria (Ö3 Austria Top 40)	2
Belgium (Ultratop 50 Flanders)	4
Belgium (Ultratop 50 Wallonia)	2
Bulgaria Airplay (PROPHON)	10
Canada Hot 100 (Billboard)	2
Canada CHR/Top 40 (Billboard)	1
Canada Hot AC (Billboard)	6
CIS Airplay (TopHit)	22
Croatia International Airplay (Top lista)	1
Czech Republic Airplay (ČNS IFPI)	2
Czech Republic Singles Digital (ČNS IFPI)	3
Denmark (Tracklisten)	2
Ecuador (National-Report)	7
Euro Digital Song Sales (Billboard)	5
Finland (Suomen virallinen lista)	3
France (SNEP)	6
Germany (GfK)	2
Germany Dance (Official German Charts)	1
Greece Digital (Billboard)	4
Hungary (Dance Top 40)	35
Hungary (Rádiós Top 40)	2
Hungary (Single Top 40)	5
Hungary (Stream Top 40)	2
Ireland (IRMA)	2
Israel International TV Airplay (Media Forest)	7
Italy (FIMI)	8
Japan Hot 100 (Billboard)	56
Latvia Streaming (LaIPA)	95
Lebanon (Lebanese Top 20)	1
Luxemboburg Digital (Billboard)	4
Malaysia (RIM)	3
Mexico Airplay (Billboard)	6
Mexico Ingles Airplay (Billboard)	2
Mexico Streaming (AMPROFON)	10
Netherlands (Dutch Top 40)	2
Netherlands (Mega Top 50)	3
Netherlands (Single Top 100)	3
New Zealand (Recorded Music NZ)	3
Norway (VG-lista)	1
Philippines (Philippine Hot 100)	27
Poland Airplay (ZPAV)	5
Portugal (AFP)	4
Russia Airplay (TopHit)	26
Scottish Singles Sales (Official Charts)	3
Slovakia Airplay (ČNS IFPI)	9
Slovakia Singles Digital (ČNS IFPI)	2
Slovenia (SloTop50)	13
Spain (Promusicae)	8
Sweden (Sverigetopplistan)	2
Switzerland (Schweizer Hitparade)	3
UK Singles (Official Charts)	7
UK Dance (Official Charts)	2
Ukraine Airplay (TopHit)	43
US Billboard Hot 100	10
US Adult Contemporary (Billboard)	18
US Adult Pop Airplay (Billboard)	6
US Hot Dance/Electronic Songs (Billboard)	2
US Dance Club Songs (Billboard)	7
US Pop Airplay (Billboard)	2
US Rhythmic Airplay (Billboard)	17

=== Year-end charts ===
Chart (2017)	Position
Australia (ARIA)	20
Austria (Ö3 Austria Top 40)	10
Belgium (Ultratop Flanders)	13
Belgium (Ultratop Wallonia)	4
Bolivia (Monitor Latino)	54
Brazil (Pro-Música Brasil)	73
Canada (Canadian Hot 100)	8
Colombia (Monitor Latino)	67
Denmark (Tracklisten)	10
France (SNEP)	18
Germany (Official German Charts)	13
Hungary (Rádiós Top 40)	10
Hungary (Single Top 40)	17
Hungary (Stream Top 40)	6
Iceland (Tónlistinn)	14
Israel (Media Forest)	32
Italy (FIMI)	26
Latvia Airplay (LaIPA)	6
Netherlands (Dutch Top 40)	3
Netherlands (Single Top 100)	6
New Zealand (Recorded Music NZ)	20
Norway (VG-lista)	3
Panama (Monitor Latino)	80
Paraguay (Monitor Latino)	59
Poland (Polish Airplay Top 100)	36
Portugal (AFP)	11
Slovenia (SloTop50)	19
Spain (PROMUSICAE)	31
Sweden (Sverigetopplistan)	4
Switzerland (Schweizer Hitparade)	5
UK Singles (OCC)	25
US Billboard Hot 100	27
US Adult Contemporary (Billboard)	44
US Adult Top 40 (Billboard)	17
US Hot Dance/Electronic Songs (Billboard)	4
US Mainstream Top 40 (Billboard)	5
Chart (2018)	Position
Hungary (Rádiós Top 40)	7
US Hot Dance/Electronic Songs (Billboard)	20
Chart (2019)	Position
Hungary (Rádiós Top 40)	42

=== Decade-end charts ===
Chart (2010–2019)	Position
Norway (VG-lista)	10
US Hot Dance/Electronic Songs (Billboard)	25

== Certifications ==
Region	Certification	Certified units/sales
Australia (ARIA)	5× Platinum	350,000^{‡}
Austria (IFPI Austria)	Platinum	30,000^{‡}
Belgium (BRMA)	2× Platinum	40,000^{‡}
Canada (Music Canada)	9× Platinum	720,000^{‡}
Denmark (IFPI Danmark)	3× Platinum	270,000^{‡}
France (SNEP)	Diamond	233,333^{‡}
Germany (BVMI)	2× Platinum	800,000^{‡}
Italy (FIMI)	3× Platinum	150,000^{‡}
Mexico (AMPROFON)	3× Platinum	180,000^{‡}
New Zealand (RMNZ)	4× Platinum	120,000^{‡}
Norway (IFPI Norway)	7× Platinum	420,000^{‡}
Poland (ZPAV)	3× Platinum	60,000^{‡}
Portugal (AFP)	Platinum	10,000^{‡}
Spain (Promusicae)	2× Platinum	80,000^{‡}
Switzerland (IFPI Switzerland)	3× Platinum	60,000^{‡}
United Kingdom (BPI)	2× Platinum	1,200,000^{‡}
United States (RIAA)	3× Platinum	3,000,000^{‡}
Streaming
Sweden (GLF)	7× Platinum	56,000,000^{†}
^{‡} Sales+streaming figures based on certification alone.^{†} Streaming-only figures based on certification alone.

== Release history ==
Region	Date	Format	Version	Label	Ref.
Italy	16 February 2017	Contemporary hit radio	Original	Sony	
Various	17 February 2017	Digital download	Original	Sony; Ultra	
United States	28 February 2017	Mainstream radio	Original	Ultra	
United States	7 March 2017	Rhythmic contemporary	Original	Sony; Ultra	
United Kingdom	17 March 2017	Contemporary hit radio	Original	Sony; Ultra	
United States	28 March 2017	Hot adult contemporary	Original	Sony; Ultra	
Various	7 April 2017	Digital download	Tiësto's AFTR:HRS Remix	Sony; Ultra	
