= Need Your Love =

Need Your Love may refer to:

- Need Your Love (album) or the title song, by Do As Infinity, 2005
- "Need Your Love" (Cheap Trick song), 1978
- "Need Your Love" (Gryffin and Seven Lions song), 2019
- "Need Your Love" (OneRepublic song), 2026
- "Need Your Love" (The Temper Trap song), 2012
- "Need Your Love", a song by Andrew Bayer from If It Were You, We'd Never Leave, 2013
- "Need Your Love", a song by Curtis Harding from Face Your Fear, 2017
- "Need Your Love", a song by GJan, 2013
- "Need Your Love", a song by Status Quo from Ma Kelly's Greasy Spoon, 1970
- "Need Your Love", a song by Tennis from Swimmer, 2020

== See also ==
- I Need Your Love (disambiguation)
