= Alive (Gryffin album) =

2022 album by Gryffin

Studio album by Gryffin
- Released: November 4, 2022
- Recorded: 2020–2022
- Genre: EDM; future bass; deep house; dance-pop; drum and bass
- Length: 52:37
- Label: Darkroom; Geffen
- Producer: Gryffin; Petey Martin; Chris Loco; Kygo; Snakehips; Henrik Michelsen; Jae Green; David Burris; Imad Royal; Mark Ralph; Blanke; Nurko; Jason Ross; Calle Lehmann; Medium; Kyle Reynolds; Gabe Ceribelli; Tom Taped; Brent Kutzle; Ryan Tedder

Gryffin chronology
Gravity (2019)	Alive (2022)	Pulse (2024)

Singles from Alive
- 1. "Safe with Me" Released: November 19, 2020; 2. "Best Is Yet To Come" Released: June 2, 2021; 3. "After You" Released: October 27, 2021; 4. "You Were Loved" Released: April 1, 2022; 5. "Alive" Released: May 6, 2022; 6. "Caught Up" Released: May 13, 2022; 7. "Reckless" Released: June 29, 2022; 8. "Colors" Released: July 27, 2022; 9. "Woke Up in Love" Released: September 9, 2022; 10. "Scandalous" Released: October 5, 2022; 11. "Forever" Released: October 28, 2022

Alive is the second studio album by American record producer and musician Gryffin. The album was released through Darkroom and Geffen Records on November 4, 2022, serving as the follow-up to his debut album Gravity (2019).

== Background ==
Regarding the album and its predecessor Gravity, Gryffin told BuzzFeed on a video call: "Gravity was more environmentally themed and spacey. I wanted it to be about taking you to these worlds and places, this elevated gravity-type world. For Alive, I wanted it to be a little more human-focused—focused on the emotions that we go through as human beings whether it's joy, happiness, sadness, or dealing with loss, the gamut of emotions that humans go through and makes us feel alive. I wanted to give more of an organic, human-type feel to this album rather than the space vibes of Gravity."

Consisting of a total of 17 tracks, the album features 11 previously released singles from 2020 to 2022. Much of the album was made during the COVID-19 pandemic when touring opportunities were limited. According to Gryffin, Alive is his most diverse body of work in which he explored a variety of styles and sub-genres of dance music.

== Promotion ==
=== Singles ===
- The lead single of the album, "Safe with Me", was released on November 19, 2020, in collaboration with American singer-songwriter Audrey Mika.
- The second single, "Best Is Yet To Come", was released on June 2, 2021, in collaboration with American singer-songwriter Kyle Reynolds.
- The third single, "After You", was released on October 27, 2021, in collaboration with American record producer Jason Ross featuring Swedish singer-songwriter Calle Lehmann.
- The fourth single, "You Were Loved", was released on April 1, 2022, in collaboration with American band OneRepublic.
- The fifth and title single, "Alive", was released on May 6, 2022, in collaboration with Lehmann.
- The sixth single, "Caught Up", was released on May 13, 2022, in collaboration with American singer-songwriter Olivia O'Brien.
- The seventh single, "Reckless", was released on June 29, 2022, in collaboration with Danish singer MØ.
- The eighth single, "Colors", was released on July 27, 2022, in collaboration with Australian music producer Blanke and Dutch singer-songwriter Eyelar.
- The ninth single, "Woke Up in Love", was released on September 9, 2022, through RCA Records, in collaboration with Norwegian music producer Kygo and English singer-songwriter Calum Scott. This song is also part of Kygo's fourth studio album Thrill of the Chase (2022).
- The tenth single, "Scandalous", was released on October 5, 2022, in collaboration with American singer Tinashe.
- The eleventh and final single, "Forever", was released a week prior the album release on October 28, 2022, featuring American singer Elley Duhé.

=== Tour ===
In 2022, the album was supported by the Alive Tour, which began in Brooklyn, New York City on August 18, 2022, and concluded in Washington, D.C., on December 9, 2022. The tour would originally begin on August 19, 2022, but due to high demand, Gryffin had to add a second show the day before. The tour was accompanied by music artists William Black, Last Heroes, KC Lights, Codeko, Jason Ross, Joel Corry, Surf Mesa, DOT, Elderbrook, Disco Lines, Blanke, and Far Out.

List of concerts, showing date, city, country, venue, and supporting act
Date (2022)	City	State/Region	Country	Venue	Supporting act
August 18	Brooklyn	New York	United States	The Brooklyn Mirage	William Black, Last Heroes
August 19	Brooklyn	New York	United States	The Brooklyn Mirage	KC Lights, Codeko
September 23	Charlotte	North Carolina	United States	Charlotte Metro Credit Union Amphitheatre	Jason Ross, Codeko
October 21	Morrison	Colorado	United States	Red Rocks Amphitheatre	Joel Corry, Surf Mesa, DOT
November 4	Los Angeles	California	United States	Los Angeles State Historic Park	Elderbrook, Joel Corry, Codeko
November 11	Austin	Texas	United States	ACL Live at the Moody Theater	Disco Lines, Codeko
November 12	Austin	Texas	United States	ACL Live at the Moody Theater	Blanke, Far Out
November 18	Dallas	Texas	United States	The Pavilion at Toyota Music Factory	William Black, Codeko
December 9	Washington D.C.	Maryland	United States	The Anthem	Surf Mesa, Far Out

== Track listing ==
No.	Title	Writer(s)	Producer(s)	Length
1.	"Intro"	Daniel Griffith	Gryffin	1:35
2.	"Alive" (with Calle Lehmann)	Griffith; Calle Lehmann; Litens Anton Nilsson; Isac Hördegård; Hannes Roovers	Gryffin	3:42
3.	"Forever" (featuring Elley Duhé)	Griffith; Elley Duhé; Johan Lindbrandt; Patrick Joseph Martin; Leah Pringle	Gryffin; Petey Martin	3:07
4.	"Lose Your Love" (with Matt Maeson)	Griffith; Matt Maeson; Mike Needle; Ollie Green; Petey Martin; Tom Grennan	Gryffin; Petey Martin	3:31
5.	"Safe with Me" (with Audrey Mika)	Griffith; Audrey Mika; Andrew Jackson; Chris Loco; Cleo Tighe	Gryffin; Chris Loco	3:25
6.	"Woke Up in Love" (with Kygo and Calum Scott)	Griffith; Kyrre Gørvell-Dahll; Calum Scott; Nathan Nicholson; Sam Gray; Joe Taylor	Gryffin; Kygo	3:37
7.	"Reckless" (with MØ)	Griffith; Henrik Michelsen; James David; Karen Marie Aagaard Ørsted Andersen; Oliver Dickinson; Jacob Greenspan; Koda	Gryffin; Snakehips; Henrik Michelsen; Jae Green	2:36
8.	"Glitch in the Simulation" (with Salem Ilese)	Griffith; David Burris; Christina Galligan; Salem Ilese Davern	Gryffin; David Burris	2:31
9.	"Evergreen" (with Au/Ra)	Griffith; Michelle Buzz; Jamie Stenzel; Imad-Roy El-Amine	Gryffin; Imad Royal	4:07
10.	"Scandalous" (with Tinashe)	Griffith; Tom Mann; Mark Blackwell; Jackson; Tinashe	Gryffin; Mark Ralph	2:39
11.	"Interlude"	Griffith	Gryffin	1:40
12.	"Colors" (with Blanke and Eyelar)	Griffith; Eyelar Mirzazadeh; Alex Pavelich; Edvard Erfjord; Yasmin Setarreh Moosavi	Gryffin; Blanke; Nurko	3:51
13.	"After You" (with Jason Ross featuring Calle Lehmann)	Griffith; Carl Lehmann; Hördegård; Roovers	Gryffin; Jason Ross; Calle Lehmann; Medium	3:44
14.	"Best Is Yet To Come" (with Kyle Reynolds)	Griffith; Kyle Reynolds; April Bender; Gabe Ceribelli	Gryffin; Kyle Reynolds; Gabe Ceribelli	3:35
15.	"Sometimes You Know" (with Maia Wright)	Griffith; Maia Wright; Tom Liljegren	Gryffin; Tom Taped	2:15
16.	"Caught Up" (with Olivia O'Brien)	Griffith; Chloe George; Fran Hall; Dallas Koehlke	Gryffin	2:53
17.	"You Were Loved" (with OneRepublic)	Griffith; Ryan Tedder; Brent Kutzle	Gryffin; Brent Kutzle; Ryan Tedder	3:43
Total length:				52:37

== Charts ==
=== Weekly charts ===
Chart (2022)	Peak position
US Top Dance Albums (Billboard)	3
