= Gravity (Gryffin album) =

2019 album by Gryffin

Studio album by Gryffin
- Released: October 24, 2019
- Recorded: 2016–2019
- Length: 55:19
- Labels: Darkroom; Geffen
- Producers: Gryffin; Josh Gudwin; Mark Ralph; Max Aruj; Slander; Silvester "Sly" Sivertsen; Seven Lions; Johan Lindbrandt; Jussifer; Aaron Forbes; Droeloe; Trackside; Mitch Allan; Nick Marsh; Sean Tianihad; Reuben Keeney; TMS; Midnight Kids; Fancy Cars; Gorgon City; Jack & Coke; Dilby; Afterhrs; Vargas & Lagola; Mac & Phil; The Futuristics

Gryffin chronology
| Gravity, Pt. 1 (2018) | Gravity (2019) | Alive (2022) |

Singles from Gravity
- 1. "Nobody Compares to You" Released: October 6, 2017; 2. "Just for a Moment" Released: June 22, 2018; 3. "Tie Me Down" Released: August 3, 2018; 4. "Remember" Released: October 26, 2018; 5. "Bye Bye" Released: November 30, 2018; 6. "All You Need to Know" Released: March 27, 2019; 7. "Hurt People" Released: May 17, 2019; 8. "OMG" Released: July 31, 2019; 9. "Baggage" Released: September 19, 2019; 10. "Body Back" Released: October 18, 2019

Gravity is the debut studio album by American record producer and musician Gryffin. It was released through Darkroom and Geffen Records on October 24, 2019, succeeding its prelude Gravity, Pt. 1.

== Background ==
Gryffin told LA Weekly: "This album's a big milestone for me. I first came up remixing music, now I'm focusing on all my original music. This album is the first bloody work I'm putting out there and it's gonna live forever."

The album was originally slated to be the second part to Gravity, Pt. 1 and be released on October 10.

== Promotion ==
=== Singles ===
The song "Nobody Compares to You", featuring Katie Pearlman, was released in October 2017, followed by "Just for a Moment", featuring Iselin Solheim, released in June 2018. In August 2018, Gryffin was rebranded and, to mark the occasion, released "Tie Me Down", in collaboration with Elley Duhe, weeks apart from her collaboration with Zedd. "Remember", with Zohara, was released in October 2018, which was shortly followed by the announcement of an upcoming project. Two promotional singles were released, entitled "Bye Bye", featuring Ivy Adara, and "You Remind Me", featuring Stanaj, before the release of his debut extended play Gravity, Pt. 1.

In 2019, "All You Need to Know", in collaboration with Slander and featuring Calle Lehmann, was released in March 2019. "Hurt People", in collaboration with Aloe Blacc, was shortly followed in May 2019. Gryffin announced the release of the song "OMG", in collaboration with Carly Rae Jepsen, in July 2019, captioning the post "Big one coming this week".

In September 2019, Gryffin announced the full-length album was to be released on October 10, 2019, and released the song "Baggage", in collaboration with Gorgon City and AlunaGeorge. Following its release, Billboard previewed the record, saying: "If the early tracks are any indication, the LP will be jam-packed with massive collabs showing off the producer's wide-ranging sonic palette and full songwriting scope."

In October 2019, Gryffin announced the last single from the album to be released, entitled "Body Back", featuring vocals from Maia Wright, a week prior to album release on October 18, 2019.

=== Tour ===
In 2019, the album was supported by the Gravity Tour which was set up in two parts. The first began in Philadelphia on January 25, 2019, concluding in Pomona, California, on February 26, 2019. Additionally, it featured special guests Shallou, SNBRN, Yung Bae and Devault.

The second part, officially titled Gravity II Tour, began in Los Angeles on October 11, 2019, and concluded in San Diego on December 7, 2019. Like its previous leg, it will also feature special guests, which were announced in August as Jonas Blue, Medasin, The Knocks, Bunt and Fairlane.

List of concerts, showing date, city, country, venue, and supporting act
| Date | City | State/Region | Country | Venue | Supporting act |
Leg 1 – The Gravity Tour
| January 25, 2019 | Philadelphia | Pennsylvania | United States | Theatre of Living Arts | SNBRN |
| January 26, 2019 | Washington D.C. | Maryland | United States | Echostage | SNBRN |
| January 31, 2019 | Boston | Massachusetts | United States | House of Blues | SNBRN |
| February 1, 2019 | Brooklyn | New York | United States | Brooklyn Steel | SNBRN |
| February 2, 2019 | Brooklyn | New York | United States | Brooklyn Steel | SNBRN |
| February 5, 2019 | Syracuse | New York | United States | The Westcott Theater | SNBRN |
| February 6, 2019 | South Burlington | Vermont | United States | Higher Ground Ballroom | SNBRN |
| February 7, 2019 | Montreal | Quebec | Canada | Corona Theatre | SNBRN |
| February 8, 2019 | Toronto | Ontario | Canada | Danforth Music Hall | SNBRN |
| February 9, 2019 | Chicago | Illinois | United States | Concord Music Hall (early) | SNBRN |
| February 9, 2019 | Chicago | Illinois | United States | Concord Music Hall (late) | SNBRN |
| February 10, 2019 | Madison | Wisconsin | United States | Majestic Theatre | SNBRN |
| February 15, 2019 | Vancouver | British Columbia | Canada | Commodore Ballroom | Shallou |
| February 16, 2019 | Seattle | Washington | United States | Showbox SoDo (early) | Shallou |
| February 16, 2019 | Seattle | Washington | United States | Showbox SoDo (late) | Shallou |
| February 17, 2019 | Portland | Oregon | United States | Roseland Theater | Shallou |
| February 20, 2019 | Boise | Idaho | United States | Knitting Factory | Shallou |
| February 21, 2019 | Salt Lake City | Utah | United States | The Depot | Shallou |
| February 23, 2019 | San Francisco | California | United States | Bill Graham Civic Auditorium | Shallou |
| February 26, 2019 | Pomona | California | United States | Fox Theatre | Yung Bae, Devault |
Leg 2 – Gravity II Tour
| October 11, 2019 | Los Angeles | California | United States | Shrine Expo Hall | Jonas Blue, Bunt |
| October 12, 2019 | Los Angeles | California | United States | Shrine Expo Hall | Jonas Blue, Fairlane |
| October 18, 2019 | Avila Beach | California | United States | Avila Beach | Medasin, Bunt |
| October 19, 2019 | San Jose | California | United States | SJSU Event Center | Medasin, Bunt |
| October 20, 2019 | Sacramento | California | United States | Ace of Spades | Medasin, Bunt |
| October 22, 2019 | Boise | Idaho | United States | Knitting Factory | Medasin, Bunt |
| October 24, 2019 | Fort Collins | Colorado | United States | Aggie Theatre | Medasin, Bunt |
| October 25, 2019 | Denver | Colorado | United States | Mission Ballroom | Medasin, Fairlane |
| October 26, 2019 | Kansas City | Missouri | United States | The Truman | The Knocks, Bunt |
| October 27, 2019 | Omaha | Nebraska | United States | Slowdown | The Knocks, Bunt |
| October 29, 2019 | Sauget | Illinois | United States | Pop's | The Knocks, Bunt |
| October 30, 2019 | Bloomington | Indiana | United States | The Bluebird | The Knocks, Bunt |
| October 31, 2019 | Detroit | Michigan | United States | Royal Oak Music Theatre | The Knocks, Bunt |
| November 1, 2019 | Pittsburgh | Pennsylvania | United States | Stage AE | The Knocks, Bunt |
| November 2, 2019 | Cleveland | Ohio | United States | Agora Theatre and Ballroom | The Knocks, Bunt |
| November 5, 2019 | Indianapolis | Indiana | United States | Deluxe at Old National Theatre | The Knocks, Bunt |
| November 6, 2019 | Cincinnati | Ohio | United States | Bogart's | The Knocks, Bunt |
| November 7, 2019 | Louisville | Kentucky | United States | Mercury Ballroom | The Knocks, Bunt |
| November 9, 2019 | Columbus | Ohio | United States | Express Live! | The Knocks, Bunt |
| November 12, 2019 | Norfolk | Virginia | United States | The NorVa | The Knocks, Bunt |
| November 13, 2019 | Richmond | Virginia | United States | The National | The Knocks, Bunt |
| November 14, 2019 | Nashville | Tennessee | United States | Marathon Music Works | The Knocks, Bunt |
| November 15, 2019 | Atlanta | Georgia | United States | Tabernacle | The Knocks, Bunt |
| November 16, 2019 | Charlotte | North Carolina | United States | The Fillmore Charlotte | The Knocks, Bunt |
| November 17, 2019 | Raleigh | North Carolina | United States | The Ritz | The Knocks, Bunt |
| November 19, 2019 | Greenville | South Carolina | United States | The Firmament | The Knocks, Bunt |
| November 20, 2019 | Columbia | South Carolina | United States | The Senate | The Knocks, Bunt |
| November 21, 2019 | Tallahassee | Florida | United States | The Moon | The Knocks, Bunt |
| November 22, 2019 | Orlando | Florida | United States | The Plaza Live | The Knocks, Bunt |
| November 23, 2019 | St. Petersburg | Florida | United States | Jannus Live | Bunt |
| November 26, 2019 | New Orleans | Louisiana | United States | The Joy Theater | The Knocks, Bunt |
| November 27, 2019 | Dallas | Texas | United States | South Side Ballroom | The Knocks, Bunt |
| November 29, 2019 | Austin | Texas | United States | Emo's | The Knocks, Bunt |
| November 30, 2019 | Houston | Texas | United States | House of Blues Houston | The Knocks, Bunt |
| December 1, 2019 | Oklahoma City | Oklahoma | United States | Tower Theatre | The Knocks, Bunt |
| December 3, 2019 | Tucson | Arizona | United States | The Rialto Theatre | The Knocks, Bunt |
| December 4, 2019 | Phoenix | Arizona | United States | The Van Buren | The Knocks, Bunt |
| December 7, 2019 | San Diego | California | United States | SOMA | Bunt |

== Track listing ==
| No. | Title | Writer(s) | Producer(s) | Length |
|---|---|---|---|---|
| 1. | "Intro" | Daniel Griffith; Max Aruj | Gryffin; Aruj^{[a]} | 1:57 |
| 2. | "All You Need to Know" (with Slander featuring Calle Lehmann) | Griffith; Samuel Preston; Calle Lehmann; Sylvester "Sly" Sivertsen | Gryffin; Slander; Sivertsen^{[a]} | 3:58 |
| 3. | "Need Your Love" (with Seven Lions featuring Noah Kahan) | Griffith; Jeffrey Montalvo; Johan Lindbrandt; Sandro Cavazza; Adrian Galvin | Gryffin; Seven Lions; Lindbrandt^{[b]} | 3:25 |
| 4. | "Tie Me Down" (with Elley Duhé) | Griffith; Badrilla Bourelly; Sarah Aarons; Nathaniel Cyphert; Jussi Karvinen; Aaron Forbes | Gryffin; Jussifer^{[a]}; Forbes^{[a]}; Josh Gudwin^{[c]} | 3:38 |
| 5. | "Nothing Like You" (with Droeloe featuring Hana) | Griffith; Josephine Vander Gucht; Anthony West | Gryffin; Droeloe^{[a]} | 3:00 |
| 6. | "Remember" (with Zohara) | Griffith; Rachel Salvit; Jenna Andrews; Parrish Warrington; Diederik van Elsas | Gryffin; Trackside^{[a]}; Mark Ralph^{[b]} | 3:41 |
| 7. | "Body Back" (featuring Maia Wright) | Griffith; Bebe Rexha; Lauren Christy; Mitch Allan; Par Westerlund | Gryffin; Allan^{[a]}; Ralph^{[b]} | 3:34 |
| 8. | "Bye Bye" (featuring Ivy Adara) | Griffith; Kate Morgan; Nicholas Marsh; Sean Tianihad; Reuben Keeney | Gryffin; Marsh^{[a]}; Tianihad^{[a]}; Keeney^{[a]} | 3:30 |
| 9. | "If I Left the World" (featuring Marina and Model Child) | Griffith; Marina Diamandis; Daniel Parker; Thomas Barnes; Peter Kelleher; Benjamin Kohn | Gryffin; TMS^{[a]}; Midnight Kids^{[b]} | 3:19 |
| 10. | "Out of My Mind" (featuring Zohara) | Griffith; Salvit; Emily Schlosser; Alan Notkin; Brandon Paddock | Gryffin; Fancy Cars^{[b]} | 3:00 |
| 11. | "Baggage" (with Gorgon City and AlunaGeorge) | Griffith; Jonnali Parmenius; Ilsey Juber; Aluna Francis; Jakob Hazell; Svante Halldin | Gryffin; Gorgon City; Jack & Coke^{[a]}; Dilby^{[a]} | 3:16 |
| 12. | "Just for a Moment" (featuring Iselin Solheim) | Griffith; Iselin Solheim; Maria Smith; Victor Thell | Gryffin | 4:13 |
| 13. | "OMG" (with Carly Rae Jepsen) | Griffith; Carly Rae Jepsen; Alexandra Tamposi; Liza Owen; John Ryan II; Andrew Haas; Ian Franzino | Gryffin; Afterhrs^{[a]} | 3:35 |
| 14. | "You Remind Me" (featuring Stanaj) | Griffith; Albert Stanaj; Vincent Pontare; Salem Al Fakir | Gryffin; Vargas & Lagola^{[a]} | 3:36 |
| 15. | "Hurt People" (with Aloe Blacc) | Griffith; Corey Sanders; Matthew Holmes; Philip Leigh; Dan Smith | Gryffin; Mac & Phil; Gudwin^{[c]} | 3:46 |
| 16. | "Nobody Compares to You" (featuring Katie Pearlman) | Griffith; Katie Pearlman; Shae Jacobs; Alexander Schwartz; Joseph Khajadourian | Gryffin; The Futuristics | 3:51 |
| Total length: | | | | 55:19 |

Japanese edition
| No. | Title | Writer(s) | Producer(s) | Length |
|---|---|---|---|---|
| 17. | "Feel Good" (with Illenium featuring Daya) | Griffith; Nicholas Miller; Grace Tandon; Nisha Asnani; Toby Gad | Gryffin; Illenium | 4:08 |
| 18. | "Whole Heart" (with Bipolar Sunshine) | Griffith; James Earp; Adio Marchant | Gryffin | 3:46 |
| 19. | "Heading Home" (featuring Josef Salvat) | Griffith; Josef Salvat; Justin Parker | Gryffin | 4:32 |
| 20. | "Love In Ruins" (featuring Sinéad Harnett) | Griffith; Sinead Harnett; Cass Lowe | Gryffin | 4:20 |
| Total length: | | | | 72:05 |

Notes

- ^{^[a]} signifies a co-producer
- ^{^[b]} signifies an additional producer
- ^{^[c]} signifies a vocal producer

== Charts ==
=== Weekly charts ===
| Chart (2019) | Peak position |
|---|---|
| Canadian Albums (Billboard) | 71 |
| Japanese Albums (Oricon) | 140 |
| Lithuanian Albums (AGATA) | 70 |
| US Billboard 200 | 92 |
| US Top Dance Albums (Billboard) | 1 |

=== Year-end charts ===
| Chart (2020) | Position |
|---|---|
| US Top Dance/Electronic Albums (Billboard) | 9 |
