= Zohara (singer-songwriter) =

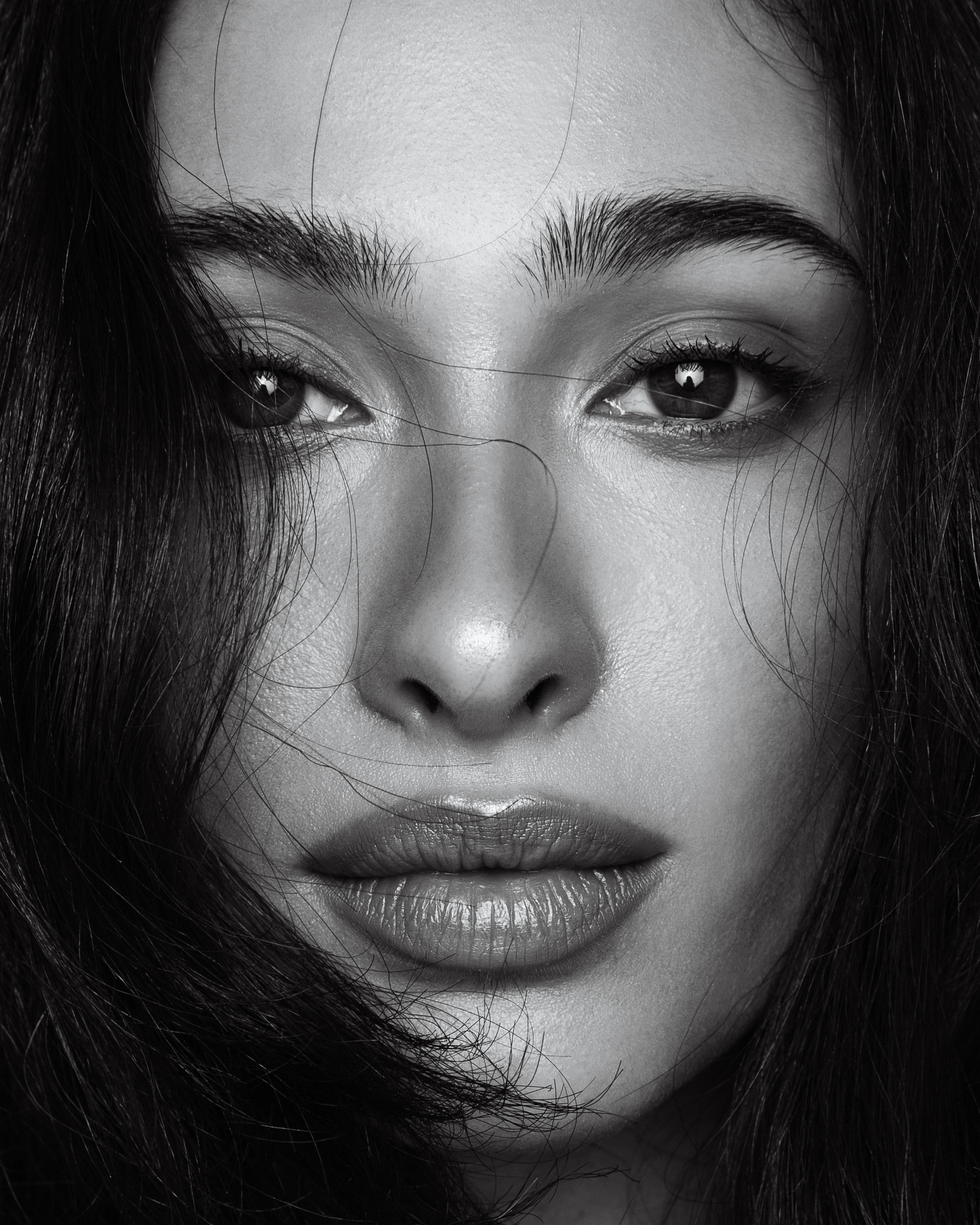

Background information
- Born: Rachel Salvit; Jerusalem, Israel
- Genres: EDM; Pop
- Occupation: Singer-songwriter
- Years active: 2017–present

Rachel Salvit, known professionally as Zohara (stylized in all caps), is an American-Israeli pop-EDM singer-songwriter based in Los Angeles.

== Early life ==
Zohara was born in Jerusalem and raised in New York City. She moved to Los Angeles at age 18.

== Career ==
Zohara co-wrote and provided vocals on Gryffin's 2018 dance-pop single "Remember", the second single on his EP Gravity Pt. 1. It reached number one on the Billboard Dance Club Songs chart and number 22 on the Hot Dance/Electronic Songs chart. She and Gryffin performed the track live at Coachella in 2019. She also co-wrote and provided vocals on Gryffin's song "Out of My Mind" and was featured on the single "Where Are You Tonight" off of Gryffin's 2024 album Pulse. She collaborated on the 2020 Kream single "Water", the 2021 Vavo and Nicopop single "Why Do I?" and the 2026 Slander and Nghtmre single "Free".

She performed live at Ultra Music Festival in 2024, and has also performed at EDC Vegas, Red Rocks Amphitheatre, Brooklyn Mirage, and Outside Lands.

== Discography ==
=== Singles ===
Title	Year	Peak chart positions			Album
Title	Year	US Dance/ Elec.	US Dance Digital	US Dance Club	Album
"I Feel U" (with Yuppycult)	2017	—	—	—	
"Remember" (with Gryffin)	2018	22	14	1	Gravity Pt. 1
"Water" (with Kream)	2020	—	—	—	
"Why Do I?" (with Vavo and Nicopop)	2021	—	—	—	
"Where Are You Tonight" (with Gryffin)	2024	—	—	—	
"Free" (with Slander and Nghtmre)	2026	—	—	—	
"—" denotes a recording that did not chart or was not released in that territory.
