= Tie Me Down =

Tie Me Down may refer to:

- "Tie Me Down" (New Boyz song), 2009
- "Tie Me Down" (Gryffin and Elley Duhé song), 2018
