= Öwnboss =

Brazilian DJ and producer

Background information
- Born: Eduardo Fornasa Zaniolo; 16 June 1989 (age 37); Curitiba, Paraná, Brazil
- Genres: Electronica; Bass House
- Years active: 2015–present
- Labels: Spinnin' Records; Musical Freedom; Universal Music; Sony Music; Monstercat

Eduardo Fornasa Zaniolo (born 16 June 1989), better known by his stage name Öwnboss, is a Brazilian electronic dance music producer and DJ from Florianópolis, Santa Catarina.

He is best known for his single "Move Your Body", which became a global hit, with over 200 million streams. The track was also the 4th most played song in the world in 2022, according to the 1001Tracklists, and received the award for "Best Bass House Track of the Year" at the 2022 EDM Awards. It was also featured in the official soundtrack of EA Sports' F1 22.

== Musical career ==
Öwnboss's music is characterized by its lively rhythm and strong bass lines. He has been featured on major labels such as Spinnin' Records and Ultra Records, and is currently exclusive to Tiësto's Musical Freedom.

Öwnboss has released several tracks, including "Papapo" and "Left & Right" as well as remixes for renowned artists such as Tiësto, David Guetta, and Dimitri Vegas & Like Mike. His music has been a constant presence in the Beatport charts, leading the Bass House genre chart for 11 consecutive months. Öwnboss was named one of the 20 most promising artists of the year by Tomorrowland's One World Radio in 2022. In the same year, he was the third most listened-to Brazilian artist in the world and "Move Your Body" was the second most listened-to Brazilian song abroad, behind only Anitta's "Envolver".

He has performed at events such as Tomorrowland's Mainstage, Rock In Rio, Lollapalooza, Creamfields, Ushuaïa Ibiza, Parookaville Festival, F*** Me I'm Famous, Green Valley, Laroc Club, and Festival Só Track Boa, among others.

== Discography ==
- "Move Your Body" (with Sevek) (2021, Spinnin')
- "Left & Right" (with Fast Boy) (2022, Musical Freedom)
- "Riot" (with Selva) (2023, Monstercat)
- "Beat of Your Love" (with Lawrent and Ekko) (2024, Spinnin')
- "Love You for the Summer" (with Nicky Romero and Oaks) (2024, Monstercat)
