= Safe with Me (disambiguation) =

"Safe with Me" is a 2013 song by Sam Smith

Safe with Me may also refer to:

- Safe with Me, 1979 album by Irma Thomas
  - "Safe with Me", song by Irma Thomas
- "Safe with Me", song by Billie Piper from the album Walk of Life, 2000
- "Safe with Me", song by Daron Jones
- "Safe with Me", song by Morten Harket from Brother
- "Safe with Me", song by Gryffin and Audrey Mika
