= Fast Boy =

German EDM and house music duo

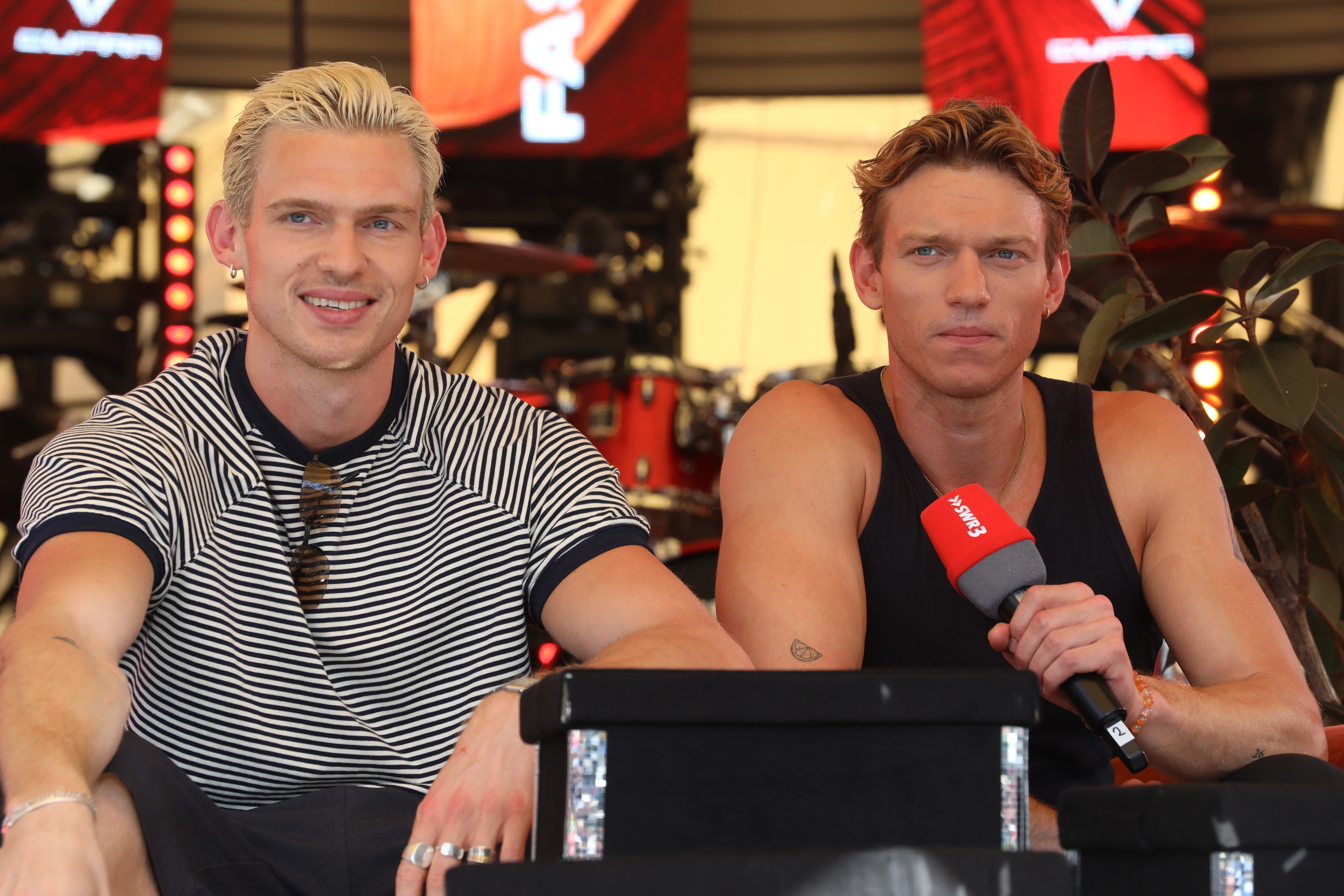
- Felix (left) and Lucas (right) in 2025

Background information
- Origin: Berlin, Germany
- Genres: EDM; house; dance-pop
- Years active: 2021–present
- Members: Lucas Hain; Felix Hain

Fast Boy (stylized as FAST BOY) is a German EDM and house duo formed in Berlin in 2021. It consists of the brothers Lucas and Felix Hain.

== History ==
Lucas and Felix Hain originally are from Karlstadt and founded Fast Boy in February 2021 in Berlin. They were musically active beforehand under the name Oh Brother in Würzburg. Both of them are record producers, songwriters and singers and collaborated with Meduza, Elley Duhé, Tiësto, Afrojack, Alok, Ofenbach, Öwnboss and Armin Van Buuren among others. "Castle" was released in 2022 starring Hugel and Alle Farben.

The duo gained attention when they featured in "Bad Memories" by Meduza and James Carter. The song peaked at number 13 in the German single charts. In February 2023, they released "Forget You" in collaboration with German DJ Topic which peaked at position 73 in the German single charts.

The duo is under contract with the management agency Friends with Benefits.

In 2024 Fast Boy collaborated with Italian singer Raf on their song "Wave", which sampled Raf's hit track "Self Control".

== Discography ==
=== Singles ===
List of singles as lead artist, with selected chart positions, showing album name and year released
Title	Year	Peak chart positions									Album
Title	Year	GER	BLR Air.	CIS Air.	CZE Air.	EST Air.	MDA Air.	POL Air.	ROU Air.	RUS Air.	Album
"Drive All Night" (with David Puentez)	2021	—	*	—	—	*		—	—	—	Non-album singles
"Fever" (with Somma)	2021	—	*	—	—	*		—	—	—	Non-album singles
"Trouble" (with Somma)	2021	—	*	—	—	*		—	—	—	Non-album singles
"Raining on Me" (Faulhaber and Noel Holler featuring Fast Boy)	2021	—	*	—	—	*		—	—	—	Non-album singles
"Castle" (Alle Farben and Hugel featuring Fast Boy)	2022	—	*	—	—	*		—	—	—	Non-album singles
"Overthinking" (with Yuma)	2022	—	*	—	—	*		—	—	—	Non-album singles
"Imagine Me" (Yves V featuring Fast Boy)	2022	—	*	—	—	*		—	—	—	Non-album singles
"One Day" (with Martin Jensen)	2022	—	*	—	—	*		—	—	—	Non-album singles
"Left & Right" (with Öwnboss)	2022	—	*	—	—	*		34	—	—	Non-album singles
"Love Me Now" (Ofenbach featuring Fast Boy)	2022	—	*	—	—	*		—	147	—	Non-album singles
"Bad Memories" (Meduza and James Carter featuring Elley Duhé and Fast Boy)	2022	13	5	4	1	6	1	1	1	7	Non-album singles
"Forget You" (featuring Topic)	2023	73	11	6	3	1	135	1	4	7	Non-album singles
"Good Life"	2023	—	—	—	8	—	—	37	—	—	Non-album singles
"Where You Are" (with Nico Santos)	2023	— (Note: "Where You Are" did not enter the Offizielle Deutsche Top 100 Single-Charts, but peaked at number 19 on the Offizielle Deutsche Top 100 Single-Trend-Charts.)	—	101	—	45	—	—	—	157	Non-album singles
"All My Life" (with Tiësto)	2024	— (Note: "All My Life" did not enter the Offizielle Deutsche Top 100 Singles Chart, but peaked at number 11 on the Offizielle Deutsche Top 100 Single-Trend-Charts.)	143	165	—	113	—	—	178	167	Non-album singles
"Electricity" (with R3hab)	2024	—	173	—	8	—	—	—	—	—	Non-album singles
"Wave" (with Raf)	2024	— (Note: "Wave" did not enter the Offizielle Deutsche Top 100 Singles Chart, but peaked at number 16 on the Offizielle Deutsche Top 100 Single-Trend-Charts.)	5	5	1	31	32	—	—	1	Non-album singles
"Chills (Feel My Love)" (with Oliver Heldens and David Guetta)	2024	—	100	—	19	171	—	33	—	—	Non-album singles
"Airforce" (with Bausa)	2024	— (Note: "Airforce" did not enter the Offizielle Deutsche Top 100 Singles Chart, but peaked at number 1 on the Offizielle Deutsche Top 100 Single-Trend-Charts.)	—	—	—	—	—	—	—	—	Non-album singles
"Last Summer" (with Moby and Sophie and the Giants)	2024	—	—	—	—	65	—	—	—	—	Non-album singles
"Million Good Reasons" (with Robin Schulz)	2025	—	—	149	5	55	—	—	—	—	Non-album singles
"Born Again" (with ClockClock)	2025	—	19	10	2	82	—	—	155	6	Non-album singles
"This Feeling"	2025	—	—	21	—	—	63	—	—	15	Non-album singles
"Music Sounds"	2026	— (Note: "Music Sounds" did not enter the German Singles Chart, but peaked at number 29 on the German Airplay chart.)	5	2	15	152	7	3	103	1	Non-album singles
"—" denotes items which were not released in that country or failed to chart. "*" denotes the chart did not exist at that time.

== Awards ==
Gold record: Denmark; 2023: for Bad Memories; France; 2024: for Bad Memories; Canada; 2023: for Bad Memories; Spain; 2024: for Bad Memories	Platinum record: Belgium; 2023: for Bad Memories; Greece; 2023: for Bad Memories; Italy; 2023: for Bad Memories; Poland; 2023: for Forget You; Portugal; 2023: for Bad Memories; 2× Platinum record: Poland; 2023: for Bad Memories
