= Audrey Mika =

American singer-songwriter

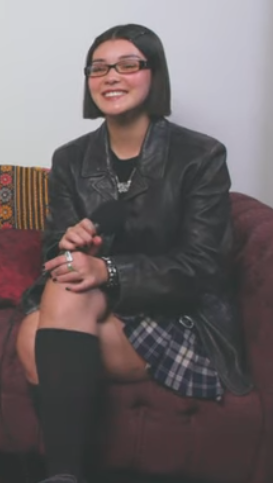
- In a 2024 interview
- Born: Audrey Mika Armacost; July 28, 2000 (age 25); San Francisco Bay Area, California, U.S.
- Other names: Audrey MiKa
- Occupations: Singer; songwriter
- Years active: 2018—present
- Musical career
- Genres: Pop; bedroom pop
- Instruments: Vocals; ukulele; guitar
- Labels: RCA; 1st Gen

YouTube information
- Channel: AudreyMikaa
- Subscribers: 1.43 million
- Views: 134.5 million
- Socials last updated: June 14, 2025

Audrey Mika Armacost (born July 28, 2000), known professionally as Audrey Mika, is an American singer and songwriter.

== Early life ==
Audrey Mika Armacost grew up in Oakland, California. Her father is an American of German origin, while her mother is Japanese. She grew up listening to jazz artists including Ella Fitzgerald and Louis Armstrong, and was trained in vocal jazz throughout her childhood. Prior to starting her music career, Mika danced competitively for 14 years until quitting in 2018. She posted her first video, an original song, to YouTube at the age of 15.

== Career ==
Mika released her debut studio album, Are We There Yet, in September 2018, through Spinnup. Following this release, she began posting covers of songs by artists such as Billie Eilish and Ariana Grande to YouTube using a toy microphone from her bedroom. Her second studio album, Level Up, was a bedroom pop effort made entirely using GarageBand, and released in February 2019. In June 2019, she released the single "Y U Gotta Be Like That", which went viral on the video-sharing platform TikTok.

Her debut extended play, 5 A.M., was released in February 2020 through RCA Records. In April 2020, she released a remix of "Y U Gotta Be Like That" with featured vocals from rapper Kyle, along with a music video for the track. She appeared as a featured vocalist alongside Tate McRae on a remix of Saygrace's song, "Boys Ain't Shit", released in April 2020. The remix spawned a music video, filmed by each of the singers remotely at home. She released the single "Just Friends" in May 2020, subsequently releasing a music video. In September 2020, she released the single "Red Gatorade". Her collaboration with American DJ Gryffin, "Safe With Me", was released in November 2020 and the music video has over 1.8 million views as of September 2023.

== Artistry ==
Mika has listed Ariana Grande, Imagine Dragons, and MARINA as influences on her music during her childhood, and listed Jhené Aiko, Dominic Fike, Omar Apollo, and Daniel Caesar as influences as well.

== Discography ==
=== Albums ===
==== Studio albums ====
Title	Details
Are We There Yet	Released: September 3, 2018; Label: Self-released; Format: Digital download
Level Up	Released: February 28, 2019; Label: Self-released; Format: Digital download

=== Extended plays ===
Title	Details
5 A.M.	Released: February 7, 2020; Label: RCA; Format: Digital download

=== Singles ===
==== As lead artist ====
Title	Year	Peak chart positions	Album
Title	Year	US Dance/ Elec.	Album
"Followin'"	2018	—	Non-album singles
"Talk About a Glo Up"	2018	—	Non-album singles
"Big Picture"	2018	—	Non-album singles
"Rough"	2018	—	Non-album singles
"Trst" (featuring Amisha Sarkar)	2019	—	Non-album singles
"Y U Gotta B Like That"	2019	—	5 A.M.
"Fake Heartbreak"	2019	—	5 A.M.
"Change Your Heart"	2019	—	5 A.M.
"Pan!c"	2020	—	5 A.M.
"Y U Gotta B Like That (Remix)" (featuring Kyle)	2020	—	Non-album singles
"Just Friends"	2020	—	Non-album singles
"Red Gatorade"	2020	—	Non-album singles
"Safe With Me" (with Gryffin)	2020	13	Alive
"Excuses"	2021	—	TBA
"Chivalry"	2021	—	TBA
"Alive"	2021	—	TBA
"—" denotes a recording that did not chart or was not released in that territory.

==== As featured artist ====
Title	Year	Album
"Yellow Hearts" (Ant Saunders featuring Audrey Mika)	2020	Bubble
"Boys Ain't Shit" (Saygrace featuring Tate McRae and Audrey Mika)	2020	The Defining Moments of Saygrace: Girlhood, Fuckboys & Situationships
"Goner" (Souly Had featuring Audrey Mika)	2020	Non-album singles
"Kinda Funny" (Young Bombs featuring Audrey Mika)	2022	Non-album singles
