= I Need Your Love =

I Need Your Love may refer to:

- "I Need Your Love" (Boston song), 1994
- "I Need Your Love" (Calvin Harris song), 2013
- "I Need Your Love" (Shaggy song), Anglophone-market release of "Habibi (I Need Your Love)", by Shaggy, Mohombi, Faydee, and Costi, 2014
- "I Need Your Love", a song by Bucks Fizz, a B-side of "New Beginning (Mamba Seyra)", 1986
- "I Need Your Love", a song by Cappella, 1996
- "I Need Your Love", a song by Dollar from Shooting Stars, 1979
- "I Need Your Love", a song by Golden Harvest from Golden Harvest, 1978
- "I Need Your Love", a song by Keane from Cause and Effect, 2019
- "I Need Your Love", a song by Kelly Marie, 1982
- "I Need Your Love", a song by Miami Sound Machine from Eyes of Innocence, 1984
- "I Need Your Love", a song by the Misunderstood from Before the Dream Faded, 1980
- "I Need Your Love", a song by Ramones from Subterranean Jungle, 1983
- "I Need Your Love", a song by Rapture from Echoes, 2003
- "I Need Your Love", a song by the Screaming Jets from Scam, 2000

== See also ==
- Need Your Love (disambiguation)
