= Nobody Compares to You =

2017 song by Gryffin

Single by Gryffin featuring Katie Pearlman

from the album Gravity
- Released: October 6, 2017
- Genre: Future bass
- Length: 3:51
- Label: UMG Recordings
- Songwriters: Alex Schwartz; Gryffith Daniel; Joseph Khajadourian; Katie Pearlman; Shae Jacobs
- Producers: Gryffin; The Futuristics

Gryffin singles chronology
"Love in Ruins" (2017)	"Nobody Compares to You" (2017)	"Winnebago" (2018)

Music video
- "Nobody Compares to You" on YouTube

"Nobody Compares to You" is a song by American DJ and producer Gryffin featuring singer Katie Pearlman. It was released on October 6, 2017.

== Composition ==
The song with gentle guitar strokes and piano chimes and the inspiring vocal work, relates an intense amount of euphoria that frees mind and takes to a warm and safe place.

== Charts ==
=== Weekly charts ===
Chart (2017–18)	Peak position
Belgium Dance (Ultratop Flanders)	37
US Hot Dance/Electronic Songs (Billboard)	20

=== Year-end charts ===
Chart (2018)	Position
US Hot Dance/Electronic Songs (Billboard)	85
