= Body Back =

2019 song by Gryffin

Single by Gryffin featuring Maia Wright

from the album Gravity
- Released: October 18, 2019
- Genre: Dance-pop; Tropical house
- Length: 3:34
- Label: Darkroom; Geffen
- Songwriters: Bebe Rexha; Lauren Christy; Dan Griffith; Mitch Allan; Pär Westerlund
- Producers: Gryffin; Mitch Allan; Mark Ralph

Gryffin singles chronology
"Baggage" (2019)	"Body Back" (2019)	"Hold You Tonight" (2020)

Music video
- "Body Back" on YouTube

"Body Back" is a song by American DJ and producer Gryffin featuring Swedish singer Maia Wright. It was released on October 18, 2019 from his studio album Gravity. The song co-wrote by Bebe Rexha, Lauren Christy, Gryffin, Mitch Allan, Pär Westerlund and produced by Gryffin, Mitch Allan, Mark Ralph.

== Charts ==
=== Weekly charts ===
Chart (2019)	Peak position
New Zealand Hot Singles (RMNZ)	14
US Hot Dance/Electronic Songs (Billboard)	14

=== Year-end charts ===
Chart (2020)	Position
US Hot Dance/Electronic Songs (Billboard)	42

== Certifications ==
Certifications for "Body Back"
Region	Certification	Certified units/sales
Australia (ARIA)	Gold	35,000^{‡}
New Zealand (RMNZ)	Gold	15,000^{‡}
^{‡} Sales+streaming figures based on certification alone.
