= You Were Loved =

2022 song by Gryffin and OneRepublic

Single by Gryffin and OneRepublic

from the album Alive
- Released: April 1, 2022
- Length: 3:42
- Label: Darkroom; Interscope
- Songwriters: Daniel Griffith; Ryan Tedder; Brent Kutzle
- Producers: Gryffin; Tedder; Kutzle

Gryffin singles chronology
"After You" (2021)	"You Were Loved" (2022)	"Alive" (2022)

OneRepublic singles chronology
"West Coast" (2022)	"You Were Loved" (2022)	"I Ain't Worried" (2022)

Music video
- "You Were Loved" on YouTube

"You Were Loved" is a song by American DJ and producer Gryffin and American pop rock band OneRepublic. It was released through Darkroom and Interscope Records on April 1, 2022, as the fourth single from the former's second studio album, Alive. An acoustic version of the song was also included on the super deluxe edition of the latter's sixth studio album, Artificial Paradise (2024).

== Background and composition ==
"You Were Loved" was written and produced by Gryffin and OneRepublic band members Ryan Tedder and Brent Kutzle. The song's lyrics describe remembrance of a love that could have been something bigger while also stating optimism in a future relationship. In a statement, Griffyn described the song at its release:

I’m extremely excited to release "You Were Loved", as this record kicks off a new era for my music. Working with One Republic has been an incredible experience and we’re really happy to have created a song that really aligns with both of our projects sonically and lyrically. We feel the record is a euphoric, summer anthem that has a strong emotive core to it. We hope everyone enjoys it as much as we did making it.

— Gryffin

== Music video ==
The music video for "You Were Loved" premiered on April 1, 2022, and was directed by Kyle Cogan. The video shows clips of Gryffin on guitar and Tedder at the microphone performing on a Los Angeles rooftop as the sun sets and turns to night.

== Track listing ==
- Digital download
1. "You Were Loved" – 3:42
- Digital download – Acoustic
1. "You Were Loved" (Acoustic) – 3:31
- Digital download – Remixes
1. "You Were Loved" (The Him Remix) – 3:38
2. "You Were Loved" (Manse Remix) – 3:48
3. "You Were Loved" (Caslow Remix) – 3:56
4. "You Were Loved" (Far Out Remix) – 4:32

== Personnel ==
Musicians

- Gryffin – programming
- Ryan Tedder – lead vocals
- Zach Filkins – lead guitar
- Drew Brown – guitar
- Brent Kutzle – bass guitar
- Eddie Fisher – drums
- Brian Willett – keyboards

Additional musicians

- Loren Ferard – guitar
- Steven Mudd – background vocals

Production

- Gryffin – production
- Tedder – production
- Kutzle – production
- John Henderson – vocal production
- Tom Norris – mixing
- Michelle Mancini – mastering

== Charts ==
Chart performance for "You Were Loved"
Chart (2022)	Peak position
New Zealand Hot Singles (RMNZ)	24
San Marino (SMRRTV Top 50)	42
US Hot Dance/Electronic Songs (Billboard)	11
