= Cry (Gryffin and John Martin song) =

2020 song by Gryffin

Single by Gryffin and John Martin
- Released: July 30, 2020
- Genre: Pop; future bass
- Length: 3:38
- Label: Darkroom; Geffen
- Songwriters: Gary Go; Dan Griffith; John Martin; Michel Zitron
- Producers: Gryffin; Jason Ross

Gryffin singles chronology
"Hold You Tonight" (2020)	"Cry" (2020)	"Safe with Me" (2020)

John Martin singles chronology
"Higher Ground" (2020)	"Cry" (2020)	"Impossible" (2021)

Music video
- "Cry" on YouTube

"Cry" is a song by American DJ and producer Gryffin and Swedish singer and songwriter John Martin. It was released on July 30, 2020. It was written by Gary Go, Gryffin, John Martin and Michel Zitron and produced by Gryffin and Jason Ross.

== Background ==
The track was debuted in April 2020 during the virtual Digital Mirage music festival. Gryffin said he wished for the track to be a "timeless dance record" and to symbolise the "first record of the next chapter" of his music.

The song features uplifting guitar melodies, bright pads, atmospheric synths.

== Music video ==
The video was premiered on July 30, 2020. A festival video was premiered on September 10, 2020, featuring footage recorded from festivals around the world that Gryffin played at from 2017 to 2020.

== Charts ==
=== Weekly charts ===
Chart (2020)	Peak position
US Hot Dance/Electronic Songs (Billboard)	12

=== Year-end charts ===
Chart (2020)	Position
US Hot Dance/Electronic Songs (Billboard)	81
