= After You (Gryffin and Jason Ross song) =

2021 song by Gryffin and Jason Ross featuring Calle Lehmann

Single by Gryffin and Jason Ross featuring Calle Lehmann

from the album Alive
- Released: October 27, 2021
- Genre: Future bass
- Length: 3:44
- Label: Darkroom
- Songwriters: Carl Lehmann; Dan Griffith; Hannes Roovers; Isac Hördegård
- Producers: Gryffin; Jason Ross; Calle Lehmann; Medium

Gryffin singles chronology
"Piece of Me" (2021)	"After You" (2021)	"You Were Loved" (2022)

Jason Ross singles chronology
"Pantheon" (2021)	"After You" (2021)	"Hate This Kind of Love" (2022)

Music video
- "After You" on YouTube

"After You" is a song by American DJs and producers Gryffin and Jason Ross, featuring vocals from Swedish singer-songwriter Calle Lehmann. It was released on October 27, 2021, via Darkroom. The song was written by Gryffin, Carl Lehmann, Hannes Roovers and Isac Hördegård.

== Background ==
In a press release: Gryffin stated: "'After You' started as an idea tossed around at the end of a long Zoom writing session. The hook immediately captivated me, and I had Calle send me his vocals right away. Jason and I were also looking to work together, and I sent him the idea and he loved it. Over the next several months, we passed the record back and forth, working in LA (Los Angeles) and virtually with Calle in Sweden to get it as perfect as possible".

== Content ==
Jackson Naffa of We Rave You described "After You" as "a story about love and the struggles one can find in experiencing it". It is written in the key of E major, with a tempo of 145 beats per minute.

== Critical reception ==
Niko Sani of EDM.com praised Gryffin and Ross "have cooked up a melodic anthem showcasing their signature sounds". Dylan Smith of EDM House commented the track "[is] a glistening dose of saccharine modern pop that leaves a lasting impression".

== Charts ==
=== Weekly charts ===
Weekly chart performance for "After You"
Chart (2021)	Peak position
US Hot Dance/Electronic Songs (Billboard)	18

=== Year-end charts ===
2022 year-end chart performance for "After You"
Chart (2022)	Position
US Hot Dance/Electronic Songs (Billboard)	83
