= Need Your Love (Gryffin and Seven Lions song) =

2019 song by Gryffin, Seven Lions and Noah Kahan

Song by Gryffin and Seven Lions featuring Noah Kahan

from the album Gravity
- Released: October 24, 2019
- Genre: Future bass
- Length: 3:25
- Label: Darkroom; Geffen
- Songwriter(s): Daniel Griffith; Jeffrey Montalvo; Johan Lindbrandt; Sandro Cavazza; Adrian Galvin
- Producer(s): Gryffin; Seven Lions; Johan Lindbrandt

"Need Your Love" is a song by American DJs and record producers Gryffin and Seven Lions, featuring vocals from American singer-songwriter Noah Kahan. It was released from Gryffin's debut studio album Gravity.

== Background ==
The song is written in the key of C major, with a tempo of 104 beats per minute. On May 1, 2020, Gryffin released a "Need Your Love" remix EP.

== Track listing ==
Digital download and streaming
No.	Title	Length
1.	"Need Your Love"	3:25

Digital download and streaming – remixes
No.	Title	Length
1.	"Need Your Love" (Nurko remix)	4:10
2.	"Need Your Love" (Juelz remix)	3:15
3.	"Need Your Love" (Crystal Skies remix)	3:05
4.	"Need Your Love" (yetep remix)	3:30

== Charts ==
=== Weekly charts ===
Weekly chart performance of "Need Your Love"
Chart (2019)	Peak position
US Hot Dance/Electronic Songs (Billboard)	12

=== Year-end charts ===
Year-end chart performance of "Need Your Love"
Chart (2020)	Position
US Hot Dance/Electronic Songs (Billboard)	71
