= All You Need to Know =

2019 song by Gryffin featuring Slander

Single by Gryffin and Slander featuring Calle Lehmann

from the album Gravity
- Released: March 27, 2019
- Genre: EDM, future bass, dance-pop
- Length: 3:58
- Label: Darkroom; Geffen
- Songwriters: Samuel Preston; Dan Griffith; Calle Lehmann; Sylvester Willy Sivertsen
- Producers: Gryffin; Slander; Calle Lehmann

Gryffin singles chronology
"Bye Bye" (2018)	"All You Need to Know" (2019)	"Hurt People" (2019)

Slander singles chronology
"Hate Being Alone" (2018)	"All You Need to Know" (2019)	"Love Is Gone" (2019)

Music video
- "All You Need to Know" on YouTube

"All You Need to Know" is a song by American DJ and producer Gryffin and American DJ duo Slander featuring Swedish singer-songwriter Calle Lehmann. It was released on March 27, 2019, as the first single from his studio album Gravity.

== Background ==
"All You Need to Know" is Gryffin's first collaboration with the DJ duo Slander and Swedish singer-songwriter Calle Lehmann. Lehmann previously featured on Galantis' track "Mama Look at Me Now" and co-wrote "Slow" for Liam Payne and "Don't Threaten Me with a Good Time" for Panic! at the Disco.

== Composition ==
The website Bass Stud remarked on the song's "warm textures and hypnotic drop", and felt that the track "merges Gryffin's melodic genius and Slander's artful basslines and immaculate sound design, and Calle Lehmann infuses each line with his undeniably lovely vocals, resulting in a track that's soaring and euphoric".

== Music video ==
The music video was released on September 6, 2019.

== Charts ==
=== Weekly charts ===
Weekly chart performance for "All You Need to Know"
Chart (2019)	Peak position
US Hot Dance/Electronic Songs (Billboard)	12

=== Year-end charts ===
Year-end chart performance for "All You Need to Know"
Chart (2019)	Position
US Hot Dance/Electronic Songs (Billboard)	52

== Certifications ==
Certifications for "All You Need to Know"
Region	Certification	Certified units/sales
Australia (ARIA)	Gold	35,000^{‡}
United States (RIAA)	Gold	500,000^{‡}
^{‡} Sales+streaming figures based on certification alone.
