= Bad Memories =

2022 single by Meduza and James Carter

Single by Meduza and James Carter featuring Elley Duhé and Fast Boy
- Released: 22 July 2022
- Length: 2:27
- Label: Island; Universal
- Composers: Chris Mears; Felix Hain; James Robert Carter; Luca De Gregorio; Lucas Hain; Mattia Vitale; Simone Giani
- Lyricists: Darren Patrick Flynn; Elley Frances Duhe
- Producers: Meduza; James Carter; Mearsy

Meduza singles chronology
"Tell It to My Heart" (2021)	"Bad Memories" (2022)	"Under Pressure" (2022)

Music video
- "Bad Memories" on YouTube

"Bad Memories" is a song by Italian production trio Meduza and British music producer James Carter, featuring American singer Elley Duhé and German EDM duo Fast Boy. It was made available for digital download and streaming by Island Records and Universal Music Group on 22 July 2022; on the same date, the latter label also sent the song to Italian radio stations.

== Charts ==
=== Weekly charts ===
Weekly chart performance for "Bad Memories"
Chart (2022–2023)	Peak position
Austria (Ö3 Austria Top 40)	6
Belarus Airplay (TopHit)	4
Belgium (Ultratop 50 Flanders)	7
Belgium (Ultratop 50 Wallonia)	11
Canada CHR/Top 40 (Billboard)	49
CIS Airplay (TopHit)	5
Croatia International Airplay (Top lista)	8
Czech Republic Airplay (ČNS IFPI)	1
Czech Republic Singles Digital (ČNS IFPI)	15
Estonia Airplay (TopHit)	6
France Airplay (SNEP)	48
France Club 40 (SNEP)	29
Germany (GfK)	13
Germany Airplay (BVMI)	6
Greece International (IFPI)	39
Hungary (Dance Top 40)	30
Hungary (Rádiós Top 40)	2
Hungary (Single Top 40)	2
Hungary (Stream Top 40)	34
Kazakhstan Airplay (TopHit)	66
Lithuania (AGATA)	14
Moldova Airplay (TopHit)	1
Netherlands (Dutch Top 40)	3
Netherlands (Single Top 100)	13
New Zealand Hot Singles (RMNZ)	24
Poland (Polish Airplay Top 100)	1
Poland (Polish Streaming Top 100)	25
Portugal (AFP)	130
Romania (Romanian Radio Airplay)	1
Romania (Romania TV Airplay)	2
Russia Airplay (TopHit)	7
Slovakia Airplay (ČNS IFPI)	2
Slovakia Singles Digital (ČNS IFPI)	12
Suriname (Nationale Top 40)	7
Sweden Heatseeker (Sverigetopplistan)	4
Switzerland (Schweizer Hitparade)	19
Ukraine Airplay (TopHit)	98
UK Singles (OCC)	80
UK Dance (OCC)	27
US Hot Dance/Electronic Songs (Billboard)	14

=== Monthly charts ===
Monthly chart performance for "Bad Memories"
Chart (2022–2023)	Peak position
Belarus Airplay (TopHit)	8
CIS Airplay (TopHit)	7
Czech Republic (Rádio – Top 100)	4
Czech Republic (Singles Digitál – Top 100)	16
Estonia Airplay (TopHit)	26
Kazakhstan Airplay (TopHit)	69
Lithuania Airplay (TopHit)	35
Moldova Airplay (TopHit)	3
Romania Airplay (TopHit)	16
Russia Airplay (TopHit)	10
Slovakia (Rádio Top 100)	3
Slovakia (Singles Digitál Top 100)	17

=== Year-end charts ===
2022 year-end chart performance for "Bad Memories"
Chart (2022)	Position
Belgium (Ultratop 50 Flanders)	69
Belgium (Ultratop 50 Wallonia)	96
CIS Airplay (TopHit)	45
Hungary (Single Top 40)	23
Lithuania (AGATA)	87
Netherlands (Dutch Top 40)	9
Netherlands (Single Top 100)	50
Poland (ZPAV)	12
Russia Airplay (TopHit)	65
US Hot Dance/Electronic Songs (Billboard)	69

2023 year-end chart performance for "Bad Memories"
Chart (2023)	Position
Austria (Ö3 Austria Top 40)	18
Belarus Airplay (TopHit)	45
Belgium (Ultratop 50 Flanders)	65
Belgium (Ultratop 50 Wallonia)	77
CIS Airplay (TopHit)	48
Germany (Official German Charts)	46
Hungary (Dance Top 40)	76
Hungary (Rádiós Top 40)	22
Lithuania Airplay (TopHit)	33
Moldova Airplay (TopHit)	3
Netherlands (Single Top 100)	74
Poland (Polish Airplay Top 100)	47
Poland (Polish Streaming Top 100)	94
Romania Airplay (TopHit)	49
Russia Airplay (TopHit)	162
Switzerland (Schweizer Hitparade)	40
US Hot Dance/Electronic Songs (Billboard)	78

2024 year-end chart performance for "Bad Memories"
Chart (2024)	Position
CIS Airplay (TopHit)	172
Hungary (Dance Top 40)	98
Moldova Airplay (TopHit)	101
Romania Airplay (TopHit)	144

2025 year-end chart performance for "Bad Memories"
Chart (2025)	Position
Moldova Airplay (TopHit)	89
Romania Airplay (TopHit)	140

== Certifications ==
Certifications for "Bad Memories"
Region	Certification	Certified units/sales
Austria (IFPI Austria)	Gold	15,000^{‡}
Belgium (BRMA)	Platinum	40,000^{‡}
Brazil (Pro-Música Brasil)	Diamond	160,000^{‡}
Canada (Music Canada)	Gold	40,000^{‡}
Denmark (IFPI Danmark)	Platinum	90,000^{‡}
France (SNEP)	Gold	100,000^{‡}
Germany (BVMI)	Platinum	600,000^{‡}
Italy (FIMI)	Platinum	100,000^{‡}
New Zealand (RMNZ)	2× Platinum	60,000^{‡}
Poland (ZPAV)	3× Platinum	150,000^{‡}
Portugal (AFP)	Platinum	10,000^{‡}
Spain (Promusicae)	Gold	30,000^{‡}
Switzerland (IFPI Switzerland)	Platinum	20,000^{‡}
United Kingdom (BPI)	Gold	400,000^{‡}
Streaming
Greece (IFPI Greece)	Platinum	2,000,000^{†}
^{‡} Sales+streaming figures based on certification alone.^{†} Streaming-only figures based on certification alone.

== Release history ==
Release dates and formats for "Bad Memories"
Region	Date	Format(s)	Label	Ref.
Various	22 July 2022	Digital download; streaming	Island; Universal	
Italy	22 July 2022	Radio airplay	Universal	
