= Tie Me Down (Gryffin and Elley Duhé song) =

2018 song by Gryffin featuring Elley Duhé

Single by Gryffin and Elley Duhé

from the album Gravity
- Released: August 3, 2018
- Recorded: October 3, 2016
- Genre: Dance-pop
- Length: 3:38
- Label: Darkroom; Geffen
- Composers: Aron Forbes; Dan Griffith; Jussi Ilmari Karvinen
- Lyricists: Nate Cyphert; Sarah Aarons
- Producers: Gryffin; Aron Forbes; Jussifer

Gryffin singles chronology
"Just for a Moment" (2018)	"Tie Me Down" (2018)	"Remember" (2018)

Elley Duhé singles chronology
"Way Down Low" (2018)	"Tie Me Down" (2018)	"Easy" (2019)

Music video
- "Tie Me Down" on YouTube

"Tie Me Down" is a song by American DJ and producer Gryffin and American singer Elley Duhé, released on August 3, 2018, from his debut studio album Gravity (2018). The audio of this song was released on July 30, 2018 via YouTube, the song was first heard on October 3, 2016.

== Background ==
"Tie Me Down"
20-second sample from Tie Me Down

Gryffin said in a statement: "Tie Me Down' is a song that's been over a year in the making." "It's one of the hardest records I've had to make, but one of my favorites. We went through over 10 different vocalists looking for the perfect match on this song, and finally found it with Elley Duhé. She brings the perfect energy and passion to the record, and I couldn't be more proud of the way it came together."

== Music video ==
The music video was released on September 5, 2018, directed by Drew Kirsch and Jordan Rosenheck. They use real people to express their love, and it has a universal message of acceptance and love.

== Live performance ==
On December 23, 2018, Gryffin and Duhé Performed "Tie Me Down" on Jimmy Kimmel Live!

== Charts ==
=== Weekly charts ===
Weekly chart performance for "Tie Me Down"
Chart (2018)	Peak position
Belgium (Ultratip Bubbling Under Flanders)	4
US Dance Club Songs (Billboard)	11
US Hot Dance/Electronic Songs (Billboard)	15

=== Year-end charts ===
Year-end chart performance for "Tie Me Down"
Chart (2018)	Position
US Hot Dance/Electronic Songs (Billboard)	40
Chart (2019)	Position
US Hot Dance/Electronic Songs (Billboard)	63

== Certifications ==
Certifications for "Tie Me Down"
Region	Certification	Certified units/sales
Australia (ARIA)	Gold	35,000^{‡}
Brazil (Pro-Música Brasil)	Gold	20,000^{‡}
New Zealand (RMNZ)	Gold	15,000^{‡}
United States (RIAA)	Platinum	1,000,000^{‡}
Streaming
Japan (RIAJ)	Gold	50,000,000^{†}
^{‡} Sales+streaming figures based on certification alone.^{†} Streaming-only figures based on certification alone.
