= Need Your Love (OneRepublic song) =

2026 single by OneRepublic

Single by OneRepublic
- Released: April 3, 2026
- Genre: Pop rock
- Length: 3:58; 3:32 (radio edit)
- Label: BMG
- Songwriters: Ryan Tedder; David Kushner; James Essien
- Producer: Tedder

OneRepublic singles chronology
"Give Me Something" (2025)	"Need Your Love" (2026)	"In Your Eyes" (2026)

Music video
- "Need Your Love" on YouTube

"Need Your Love" is a song by American pop rock band OneRepublic, released on April 3, 2026, as a single from their upcoming seventh studio album. It was written by Ryan Tedder, David Kushner and James Essien and produced by Tedder. The song highlights the importance of valuing love over material wealth.

== Background ==
In an interview with Billboard Philippines, Ryan Tedder stated that OneRepublic began working on the song for over a year before it was released. He wanted to compose a song that he not only considered good but also had an element of surprise or "magic". As he revisited demos, he felt that "Need Your Love" stood out from the others and developed it while traveling, aiming to make the lyrics easily understandable. He attributed his inspiration to his transition to a new record label (BMG Rights Management) after 18 years. OneRepublic also teased the song during concerts in 2025.

== Critical reception ==
Ashanti Meadows of Melodic commented the song "puts a modern twist on nostalgic pop music, making it a track that will not only have the audience reminiscing on past loving memories, but also make them excited for the love they currently share with someone or the love they'll experience in the future."

== Music video ==
The music video was released alongside the single. It sees OneRepublic performing in a dimly lit warehouse.

== Charts ==
=== Weekly charts ===
Weekly chart performance
Chart (2026)	Peak position
Brazil Airplay (Crowley)	117
Canada CHR/Top 40 (Billboard)	30
Canada Hot AC (Billboard)	31
Colombia Anglo Airplay (Monitor Latino)	17
Croatia International Airplay (Top lista)	60
Czech Republic Airplay (ČNS IFPI)	8
Germany Airplay (MusicTrace)	10
Italy Airplay (EarOne)	42
Lithuania Airplay (TopHit)	44
Mexico Anglo Airplay (Monitor Latino)	11
New Zealand Hot Singles (RMNZ)	11
San Marino Airplay (SMRTV Top 50)	48
Serbia Airplay (Radiomonitor)	20
Slovakia Airplay (ČNS IFPI)	43
Slovenia Airplay (Radiomonitor)	18
South Africa Airplay (TOSAC)	20
Switzerland Airplay (MusicTrace)	3
US Bubbling Under Hot 100 (Billboard)	1
US Adult Contemporary (Billboard)	26
US Adult Pop Airplay (Billboard)	8
US Pop Airplay (Billboard)	16

=== Monthly charts ===
Monthly chart performance
Chart (2026)	Peak position
Lithuania Airplay (TopHit)	60

== Release history ==
Release dates and formats for "Need Your Love"
Region	Date	Format	Label(s)	Ref.
United States	April 7, 2026	Contemporary hit radio	BMG	
