= Maia Wright =

Swedish singer (born 1997)

- Also known as: Junie
- Born: Maia Linnea Wright; 2 October 1997 (age 28)
- Origin: Stockholm, Sweden
- Genres: Pop; Dance-pop
- Occupation: Singer
- Instrument: Vocals
- Years active: 2017–present

Maia Linnea Wright (born 2 October 1997), also known as Junie, is a Swedish singer living in Stockholm.

== Discography ==
=== EPs ===
- Firsts (2020)
- Allt som har en början har ett slut (2021)

=== Singles ===
Title	Year	Peak chart positions	Album
Title	Year	SWE	Album
"Komma över dig" (with Norlie & KKV)	2020	7	Non-album single
"Ett steg fram"	2020	— (Note: "Ett steg fram" did not enter the Swedish Singles Chart, but peaked at number six on the Swedish Heatseeker chart.)	Allt som har en början har ett slut
"Vi"	2021	48	Allt som har en början har ett slut
"Break Her Heart"	2021	—	Non-album single
"Hela världen väntar" (with Timbuktu)	2021	66	Allt som har en början har ett slut
"Do Yourself a Favor"	2021	—	Non-album single
"Tänker på dig"	2021	71	Allt som har en början har ett slut
"Quit Your Job"	2021	—	Non-album singles
"AM:PM" (with NOTD)	2023	— (Note: "AM:PM" did not enter the Swedish Singellista Chart, but peaked at number one on the Swedish Heatseeker Chart.)	Non-album singles
"Ser du hur bra jag mår"	2023	78	Non-album singles
"Lover Online" (with NOTD)	2024	—	Digital Notes
"—" denotes a recording that did not chart or was not released in that territory.

=== Featured singles ===
Title	Year	Peak chart positions		Album
Title	Year	NZ Heat	US Dance	Album
"Always Gonna Say Sorry" (Joakim Molitor featuring Maia Wright)	2017	—	—	Non-album single
"Weightless" (Joakim Molitor featuring Maia Wright)	2017	—	—	Non-album single
"Decisions" (Kream featuring Maia Wright)	2018	—	—	Non-album single
"When I'm with U" (Tritonal featuring Maia Wright)	2018	—	—	U & Me
"Wait for You" (Mike Williams featuring Maia Wright)	2019	—	—	Non-album single
"Body Back" (Gryffin featuring Maia Wright)	2019	14	14	Gravity
"One Night" (Aazar and Yung Felix featuring Ebenezer and Maia Wright)	2020	—	—	Non-album single
"One More Time" (Armin van Buuren featuring Maia Wright)	2022	—	—	Feel Again, Pt. 2
"—" denotes a recording that did not chart or was not released in that territory.
