= Safe with Me (Gryffin and Audrey Mika song) =

2020 song by Gryffin and Audrey Mika

Single by Gryffin and Audrey Mika

from the album Alive
- Released: November 19, 2020
- Genre: Future bass; pop
- Length: 3:25
- Label: Darkroom; Interscope
- Songwriters: Andrew Jackson; Dan Griffith; Audrey Mika; Chris Loco; Cleo Tighe

Gryffin singles chronology
"Cry" (2020)	"Safe with Me" (2020)	"I Want Love" (2021)

Audrey Mika singles chronology
"Red Gatorade" (2020)	"Safe with Me" (2020)	"Excuses" (2021)

Music video
- "Safe with Me" on YouTube

"Safe with Me" is a song by American DJ and producer Gryffin and American singer-songwriter Audrey Mika. It was released on November 19, 2020, via Darkroom and Interscope Records. The song was written by Gryffin, Andrew Jackson, Chris Loco, Cleo Tighe and Mika.

== Background ==
In an interview with Paper, Gryffin said: "As the song was being worked on, I got put onto Audrey's music from one of my managers, and was immediately drawn to her voice and sound. We pitched the idea of the record to her and she connected with it right away. We got into the studio in LA, and began to fully develop the sound and vibe of the record. We're so happy with how it turned out."

== Content ==
The track conveys messages of "love, safety and stability". Logan Potter of Euphoria Magazine felt that its lyrics conveys a message of "openness and comfort, admitting to putting up walls as a means of self-protection with words like." The song is written in the key of B major, with a tempo of 100 beats per minute.

== Track listing ==
Digital download and streaming
No.	Title	Length
1.	"Safe with Me"	3:25

Digital download and streaming – acoustic
No.	Title	Length
1.	"Safe with Me" (acoustic)	3:23

Digital download and streaming – remix
No.	Title	Length
1.	"Safe with Me" (TELYKast remix)	2:52

== Charts ==
=== Weekly charts ===
Weekly chart performance for "Safe with Me"
Chart (2020)	Peak position
US Hot Dance/Electronic Songs (Billboard)	13

=== Year-end charts ===
Year-end chart performance for "Safe with Me"
Chart (2021)	Position
US Hot Dance/Electronic Songs (Billboard)	48
