= Elley Duhé =

American singer (born 1992)

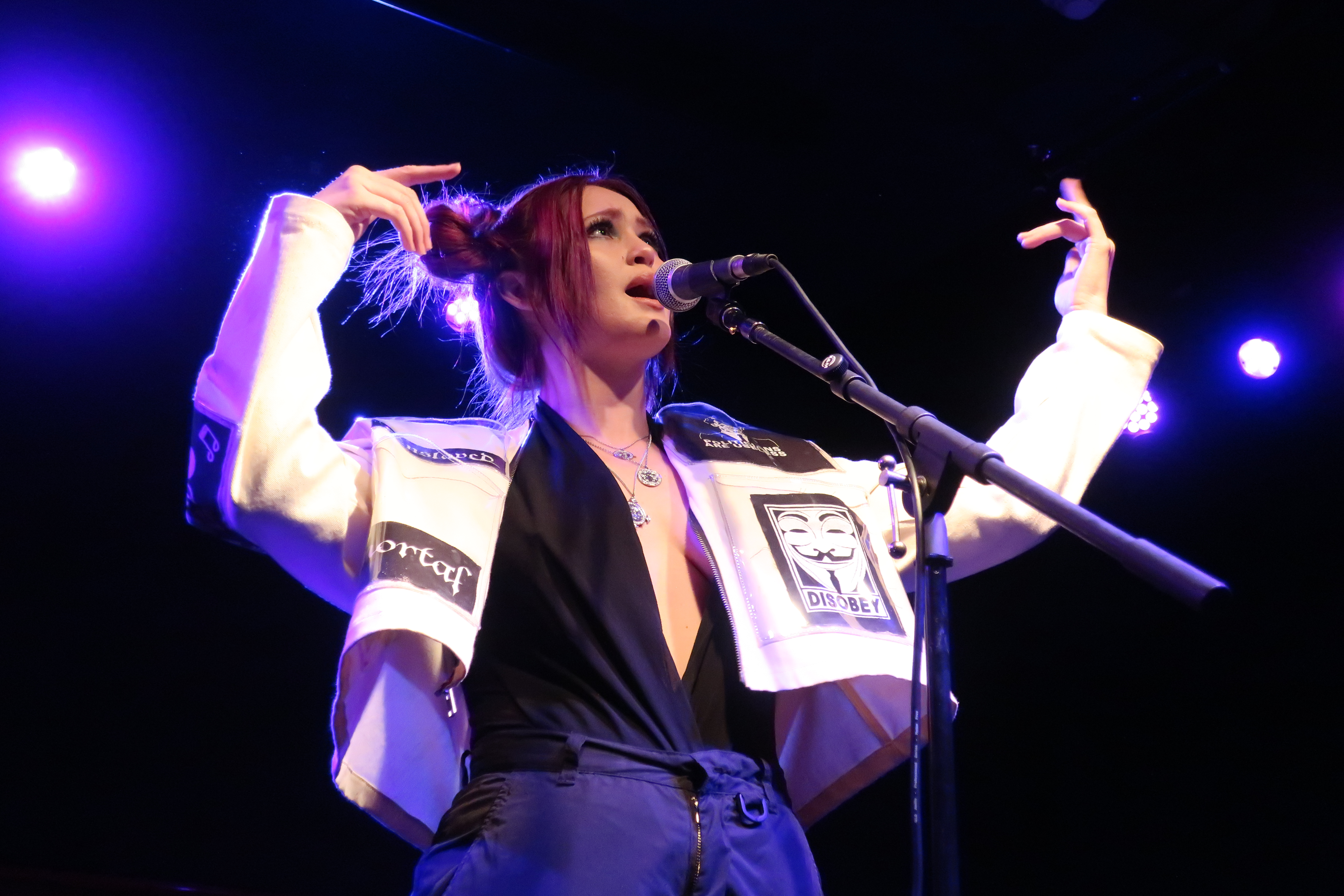
- Duhé in 2019

Background information
- Born: Elley Frances Duhé; February 14, 1992 (age 34); Mobile, Alabama, U.S.
- Origin: Vancleave, Mississippi, U.S.
- Genre: Pop
- Occupation: Singer
- Years active: 2016–present
- Labels: Not Fit for Society, RCA
- Website: elleyduhe.com

Elley Frances Duhé (born February 14, 1992) is an American singer.

== Biography ==
Duhé was born in Mobile, Alabama. After her father got Elley her first guitar when she was 14, she began her career at 15 singing in coffee shops. Duhé felt inspired by her musician father and uncles who are in the New Orleans music scene. Graduating to playing gigs in bars, restaurants, and at private parties, she gained enough exposure to be booked to open for national acts and connect with songwriters in Nashville, Los Angeles, and Austin, where, after dropping out of high school and getting her GED, she spent three years honing her craft. She appeared in the blind audition stage of the second season of The Voice in 2012, but did not advance in the competition. Early in her career she used the stage name 'L.E.D.' She currently lives in Los Angeles.

The single "Millennium", her collaboration with electronic producer Tarro, released in October 2016, was viewed over two million times on YouTube and streamed 1.4 million times on Spotify.

After Billboard premiered her single "Immortal" in December 2016, it gained 4.5 million streams on Spotify, while the video netted nearly a million views on YouTube. A 2017 remix by DJ duo Snakehips netted an additional 770,000 Spotify streams. "Immortal" was remixed again in 2022 by Fred Again and Four Tet as the single "Jungle", which charted in several countries and was certified silver in the UK.

Her follow-up single "Fly", released in July 2017, featured production from ILLA and Cool & Dre (Christina Milian, Lil Wayne).

In July 2018, she collaborated with Russian-German music producer Zedd on the single "Happy Now".

On August 3, 2018, her collaborative single with Gryffin, "Tie Me Down", was released. On August 10, 2018, she released the EP Dragon Mentality. In 2021 she released "Kids of the Night". She also released "Bad Memories" with Meduza, James Carter and Fast Boy in 2022. In the same year, her 2020 single "Middle of the Night" (which she said was originally written for The Weeknd in a TikTok video) achieved chart success after going viral on TikTok. That summer, she signed a "seven-figure artist funding deal" with beatBread to allow her to release more music independently with her label, Not Fit for Society.

== Discography ==
=== Studio albums ===
List of studio albums, with release date and label shown
Title	EP details
Phoenix	Released: October 27, 2023; Formats: Digital download, streaming; Label: Not Fit for Society
Wounded Angel	Released: September 4, 2026; Formats: digital download, streaming; Label: Not Fit for Society

=== Extended plays ===
List of EPs, with release date and label shown
Title	EP details
Dragon Mentality	Released: August 10, 2018; Formats: Digital download, streaming; Label: Not Fit for Society, RCA Records

=== Singles ===
==== As lead artist ====
List of singles as lead artist, with selected chart positions and certifications, showing year released and album name
Title	Year	Peak chart positions								Certifications	Album
Title	Year	US	AUS	CAN	GER	GRE	IND	SWE	UK	Certifications	Album
"Millennium" (with Tarro)	2016	—	—	—	—	—	—	—	—		Non-album singles
"Immortal"	2016	—	—	—	—	—	—	—	—		Non-album singles
"Fly"	2017	—	—	—	—	—	—	—	—		Non-album singles
"Can You Touch"	2017	—	—	—	—	—	—	—	—		Non-album singles
"Ain't No Feeling"	2018	—	—	—	—	—	—	—	—		Non-album singles
"Lost My Mind"	2018	—	—	—	—	—	—	—	—		Dragon Mentality
"Happy Now" (with Zedd)	2018	90	27	53	64	—	—	64	45	RIAA: Platinum; ARIA: 3× Platinum; BPI: Silver; MC: Gold; FIMI: Gold; RMNZ: Platinum	Non-album single
"Way Down Low"	2018	—	—	—	—	—	—	—	—		Dragon Mentality
"Tie Me Down" (with Gryffin)	2018	—	—	—	—	—	—	—	—	RIAA: Platinum; RMNZ: Gold	Gravity
"Easy" (with Kyd the Band)	2019	—	—	—	—	—	—	—	—		Non-album singles
"Villains"	2019	—	—	—	—	—	—	—	—		Non-album singles
"Good Die Young"	2019	—	—	—	—	—	—	—	—		Non-album singles
"Nature"	2019	—	—	—	—	—	—	—	—		Non-album singles
"Middle of the Night"	2020	— (Note: "Middle of the Night" did not enter the Billboard Hot 100, but peaked at number five on the Bubbling Under Hot 100 Singles chart.)	25	44	31	1	5	78	43	RIAA: Platinum; ARIA: Platinum; BPI: Platinum; BVMI: Gold; FIMI: Gold; MC: Platinum; RMNZ: Platinum	Non-album singles
"Love Me Hard"	2020	—	—	—	—	—	—	—	—		Non-album singles
"Kids of the Night"	2021	—	—	—	—	—	—	—	—		Non-album singles
"Traitor"	2021	—	—	—	—	—	—	—	—		Phoenix
"Pieces"	2022	—	—	—	—	—	—	—	—		Phoenix
"Don't Leave Me Lonely" (with Clean Bandit)	2022	—	—	—	—	—	—	—	—		Non-album single
"Back to You" (with Lost Frequencies and X Ambassadors)	2022	—	—	—	32	—	—	— (Note: "Back to You" did not enter the Swedish Singellista Chart, but peaked at number one on the Swedish Heatseeker Chart.)	—	BVMI: Gold; IFPI SWI: Platinum; SNEP: Gold	All Stand Together
"Money on the Dash" (with Whethan)	2023	—	—	—	51	—	—	— (Note: "Money on the Dash" did not enter the Swedish Singellista Chart, but peaked at number 18 on the Swedish Heatseeker Chart.)	63	RIAA: Gold; BPI: Gold; RMNZ: Platinum	Non-album singles
"Face Myself" (with Teddy Swims)	2023	—	—	—	—	—	—	—	—		Non-album singles
"Delirium"	2023	—	—	—	—	—	—	—	—		Phoenix
"Midnight Oil" (with Whethan)	2023	—	—	—	—	—	—	—	—		Phoenix
"Moonshine" (with Alan Walker)	2025	—	—	—	—	—	—	—	—		Non-album single
"Journey" (with Rvssian)	2026	—	—	—	—	—	—	—	—		
"This Side of Heaven"	2026	—	—	—	—	—	—	—	—		Wounded Angel
"Playboy"	2026	—	—	—	—	—	—	—	—		Wounded Angel
"Salt and Lime"	2026	—	—	—	—	—	—	—	—		Wounded Angel
"—" denotes a recording that did not chart or was not released in that territory.

==== As featured artist ====
List of singles as lead artist, with selected chart positions and certifications, showing year released and album name
Title	Year	Peak chart positions								Certifications	Album
Title	Year	AUT	BEL (FL)	GER	NZ Hot	POL	ROU	SWE Heat.	UK	Certifications	Album
"Us" (Kid Ink featuring Elley Duhé)	2018	—	—	—	—	—	—	—	—		Non-album single
"Bad Memories" (Meduza with James Carter featuring Elley Duhé and Fastboy)	2022	6	10	13	24	1	1	9	80	BPI: Gold; BVMI: Platinum; IFPI AUT: Gold; RMNZ: Platinum	Meduza
"Forever" (Gryffin featuring Elley Duhé)	2022	—	—	—	—	37	—	—	—		Alive
"Feels Like You" (Illenium featuring Elley Duhé)	2026	—	—	—	—	—	—	—	—		Odyssey
"—" denotes a recording that did not chart or was not released in that territory.

== Awards and nominations ==
Year	Nominee / work	Award	Result	Ref.
2024	"Rumble" (with Skrillex and Fred Again featuring Flowdan)	Grammy Award for Best Dance/Electronic Recording	Won	
