= Gryffin =

American musician and producer (born 1987)

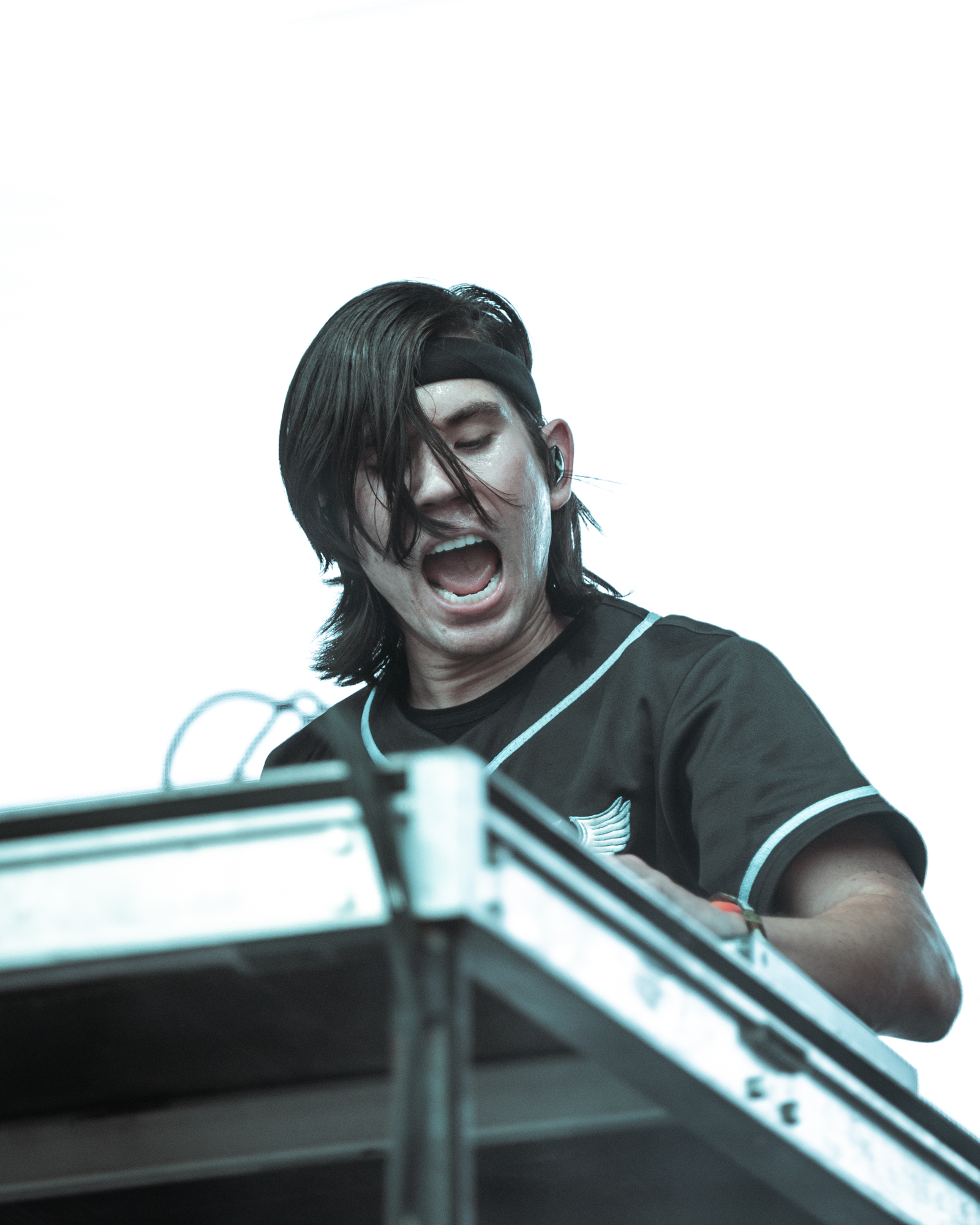
- Gryffin performing in 2018

Background information
- Born: Daniel James Griffith; September 29, 1987 (age 39); San Francisco, California, U.S.
- Genres: EDM; tropical house; future house; pop; dance-pop; future bass; drum and bass; melodic dubstep; trance
- Occupations: Musician; DJ; music producer
- Instruments: Digital audio workstation; guitar; synthesizer; piano
- Years active: 2014–present
- Labels: Interscope; Darkroom; Geffen
- Website: gryffinofficial.com
- Education: University of Southern California

Daniel James Griffith (born September 29, 1987), known by his stage name Gryffin (often stylized as GRYFFIN), is an American musician, DJ, and music producer. He gained recognition for remixing some well-known songs such as Tove Lo's "Talking Body", Maroon 5's "Animals" and Years & Years' "Desire".

== Background ==
Gryffin was born in San Francisco, California and is of Native American and Japanese descent. Gryffin grew up as a classically trained pianist and learned to play the guitar at an early age. He played in bands to initially hone his instrumental abilities. He studied electrical engineering at the University of Southern California where he took much of his leisure time in his dorm room to work on music.

In 2009, he began releasing his music as White Panda, with childhood friend Tom Evans, who was studying in Chicago. They began a national tour in July 2011, in a second generation of mashup artists gaining popularity on college campuses and music-streaming websites. They played college campuses, such as the University of Delaware and Swarthmore College, and shared the stage with Flo Rida, Wale and Sam Adams. Later performances included the Firefly Music Festival and Lolapalooza.

When asked on his key lessons of music production, he said: "At the beginning, I just released music with the main goal of having my friends play it at college parties and I never would have imagined it would get to this point". He made his 'world' debut as Gryffin at the SnowGlobe Music Festival 2015.

He moved to Los Angeles to be closer to his label and management.

== History ==
=== 2016 ===
On January 22, 2016, Gryffin released his debut single titled "Heading Home" featuring Australian singer Josef Salvat via Darkroom/Interscope Records. On May 2, 2016, an official music video was uploaded on his YouTube channel. The song peaked at number 22 on the Hot Dance/Electronic Songs chart, number 21 on the Dance/Electronic Digital Songs chart, number 1 on Spotify Viral 50 chart and number 5 on the Billboard Twitter Emerging Artists chart. On August 26, 2016, he released a song titled "Whole Heart" with Bipolar Sunshine. In an interview, about the song "Whole Heart", Gryffin said "'Whole Heart’ is a big step for me as an artist, as it represents a developing maturity of my sound and depth of songwriting".

=== 2017 ===
2017 saw three singles for Gryffin. "Feel Good", a collaboration with DJ Illenium and singer Daya, was released on March 3. "Love in Ruins" with singer Sinéad Harnett was released on July 7 and "Nobody Compares to You" with Katie Pearlman was released on October 6.

=== 2018 ===
2018 proved to be a big year for Gryffin, releasing five singles throughout the year. His first single of the year, "Winnebago" with Quinn XCII and Daniel Wilson was released on April 20. He followed this up with single "Just for a Moment" with Iselin, released June 22, and "Tie Me Down" with Elley Duhé, released on August 3. Two months following the release of "Tie Me Down", Griffith released a song with Zohara. "Remember" was released on October 26 and eventually topped the US Dance Charts, marking Griffith's first number one hit song.

=== 2019 ===
In 2019, Gryffin released his full-length debut album, Gravity, to critical acclaim.

=== 2020 ===
On July 26, 2020, Gryffin announced the release of "Cry", with John Martin, on his Instagram page. He hinted that the track would be the first single from his upcoming second album, and announced July 30, 2020 as the single's release date.

=== 2024 ===
On August 2, 2024, Gryffin released his third studio album Pulse. This album continues to demonstrate Gryffin's ability to captivate listeners with his melodic and emotional music. Pulse marks a new era for Gryffin, showcasing his continued experimentation with different genres while staying true to his signature sound. The album embodies themes of energy, community, and nostalgia for the early-mid 2000s EDM boom, with collaborations from artists like Elderbrook, Disco Lines, and Armin van Buuren.

== Musical style ==
Gryffin produces music in a melodic house style and classifies himself as a melodic house artist. He incorporates sounds of piano and guitar for a 'hybrid of electric and organic' musical style.

== Discography ==
=== Studio albums ===
Title	Details	Peak chart positions		
Title	Details	US	US Dance	CAN
Gravity	Released: October 24, 2019; Label: Darkroom, Geffen; Format: CD, digital download, streaming	92	1	71
Alive	Released: November 4, 2022; Label: Darkroom, Interscope, Geffen; Format: CD, digital download, streaming	—	—	—
Pulse	Released: August 2, 2024; Label: Darkroom, Interscope, Geffen; Format: CD, digital download, streaming	—	—	—
"—" denotes a recording that did not chart or was not released in that territory.

=== Extended plays ===
Title	Details
Gravity, Pt. 1	Released: December 14, 2018; Label: Darkroom, Geffen; Format: Digital download, streaming
Spotify Singles	Released: May 6, 2020; Label: Darkroom, Geffen; Format: Digital download, streaming

=== Singles ===
Title	Year	Peak chart positions				Certifications	Album
Title	Year	US Dance/ Elec.	US Dance Digital	US Dance Club	NZ Hot	Certifications	Album
"Heading Home" (featuring Josef Salvat)	2016	22	21	—	—		Gravity (Japanese edition)
"Whole Heart" (with Bipolar Sunshine)	2016	17	28	—	—	RIAA: Gold	Gravity (Japanese edition)
"Feel Good" (with Illenium featuring Daya)	2017	17	18	—	— (Note: "Feel Good" did not enter the NZ Top 40 or Hot Singles Chart, but peaked at number six on the Heatseeker Singles Chart.)	RIAA: Platinum; RMNZ: Platinum	Awake
"Love in Ruins" (featuring Sinéad Harnett)	2017	33	—	6	—		Gravity (Japanese edition)
"Nobody Compares to You" (featuring Katie Pearlman)	2017	20	11	—	—		Gravity
"Winnebago" (featuring Quinn XCII and Daniel Wilson)	2018	38	—	—	—		Non-album single
"Just for a Moment" (featuring Iselin Solheim)	2018	48	—	—	—		Gravity
"Tie Me Down" (with Elley Duhé)	2018	15	9	11	—	RIAA: Platinum; RMNZ: Gold	Gravity
"Remember" (with Zohara)	2018	22	14	1	—		Gravity
"Bye Bye" (featuring Ivy Adara)	2018	35	21	—	—		Gravity
"All You Need to Know" (with Slander featuring Calle Lehmann)	2019	12	—	—	—	RIAA: Gold	Gravity
"Hurt People" (with Aloe Blacc)	2019	28	—	19	—		Gravity
"OMG" (with Carly Rae Jepsen)	2019	16	—	1	19		Gravity
"Baggage" (with Gorgon City and AlunaGeorge)	2019	32	—	—	—		Gravity
"Body Back" (featuring Maia Wright)	2019	14	—	—	14	RMNZ: Gold	Gravity
"Hold You Tonight" (with Chris Lane)	2020	—	—	—	—		Non-album single
"Cry" (with John Martin)	2020	12	—	—	—		Gravity (Deluxe)
"Safe with Me" (with Audrey Mika)	2020	13	—	—	—		Alive
"I Want Love" (with Two Feet)	2021	14	—	—	—		Non-album single
"Best Is Yet to Come" (with Kyle Reynolds)	2021	14	—	—	—		Alive
"New Blood" (with Boy Matthews)	2021	17	—	—	—		Non-album singles
"Piece of Me" (with LOVA)	2021	15	—	—	—		Non-album singles
"After You" (with Jason Ross featuring Calle Lehmann)	2021	18	—	—	—		Alive
"You Were Loved" (with OneRepublic)	2022	11	—	—	—		Alive
"Alive" (with Calle Lehmann)	2022	22	—	—	—		Alive
"Caught Up" (with Olivia O'Brien)	2022	12	—	—	—		Alive
"Reckless" (with MØ)	2022	28	—	—	—		Alive
"Colors" (with Blanke and Eyelar)	2022	36	—	—	—		Alive
"Woke Up in Love" (with Kygo and Calum Scott)	2022	9	—	—	—		Alive and Thrill of the Chase
"Scandalous" (with Tinashe)	2022	24	—	—	—		Alive
"Forever" (featuring Elley Duhé)	2022	20	—	—	—		Alive
"Dreams"	2023	22	—	—	—		Non-album singles
"Oceans" (with Kid Joi)	2023	29	—	—	—		Non-album singles
"Last of Us" (with Rita Ora)	2024	20	—	—	—		Pulse
"What Took You So Long" (with Armin Van Buuren)	2024	—	—	—	—		Pulse
"Magic" (with babyidontlikeyou)	2024	—	—	—	—		Pulse
"Magnet" (with Disco Lines and Max)	2024	—	—	—	—		Pulse
"Dance Through the Night" (with Whethan and Norma Jean Martine)	2024	—	—	—	—		Pulse
"Never Letting Go" (with Alok and Julia Church)	2024	—	—	—	—		Non-album singles
"In My Head" (with Kaskade featuring Nu-La)	2025	15	—	—	—		Non-album singles
"Air" (with Excision featuring Julia Michaels)	2025	25	—	—	—		Non-album singles
"Hard Time Lover" (featuring Chance Peña)	2025	—	—	—	—		Non-album singles
"Higher Power" (with Lavern and AR/CO)	2025	—	—	—	—		Non-album singles
"Deep Clear Water" (with GRiZ)	2025	23	—	—	—		Non-album singles
"The Feeling" (with YDG)	2025	—	—	—	—		Non-album singles
"Save My Love" (with Kygo and Khalid)	2026	4	—	—	17		Non-album singles
"Without You" (with AVELLO featuring Sasha Alex Sloan)	2026	_	_	_	_		Non-album singles
"Spin Me Slowly" (featuring Julia Church)	2026	—	—	—	—		
"World Away" (with BUNT. and Inez)	2026	_	_	_	_		
"Wait All Night" (with Lost Frequencies and Michael Marcagi)	2026	_	_	_	_		
"—" denotes a recording that did not chart or was not released in that territory.

=== Other charted songs ===
Title	Year	Peak chart positions	Album
Title	Year	US Dance	Album
"You Remind Me" (featuring Stanaj)	2018	43	Gravity
"Need Your Love" (with Seven Lions and Noah Kahan)	2019	12	Gravity
"Heavenly Father" (featuring Noah Kahan)	2020	_	Non-album Single
