= Magic Mic =

Magic Mic is a trademark of karaoke microphones manufactured by Enter Tech that have embedded songs and require an external video display. This configuration makes them light and portable.

Enter Tech was the first manufacturer to release a portable karaoke microphone called Magic Sing in 2000. The first completely Wireless Magic Sing microphone was ED-11000, which was released in 2006. The EG-18000, released in 2007 is completely wireless. The ET-18000, released in 2008 is also completely wireless; it also has a SD card slot to accommodate a picture customized background from the user.

In the Philippines, Magic Sing is used to promote tourism by showcasing tourism spots as the picture background. The Philippine Department of Tourism and WOW Magic Sing agreed to cooperate in this endeavor to take advantage of the portability of the device to advocate awareness of tourism.
