= Laroc Club =

Nightclub in Valinhos, Brazil

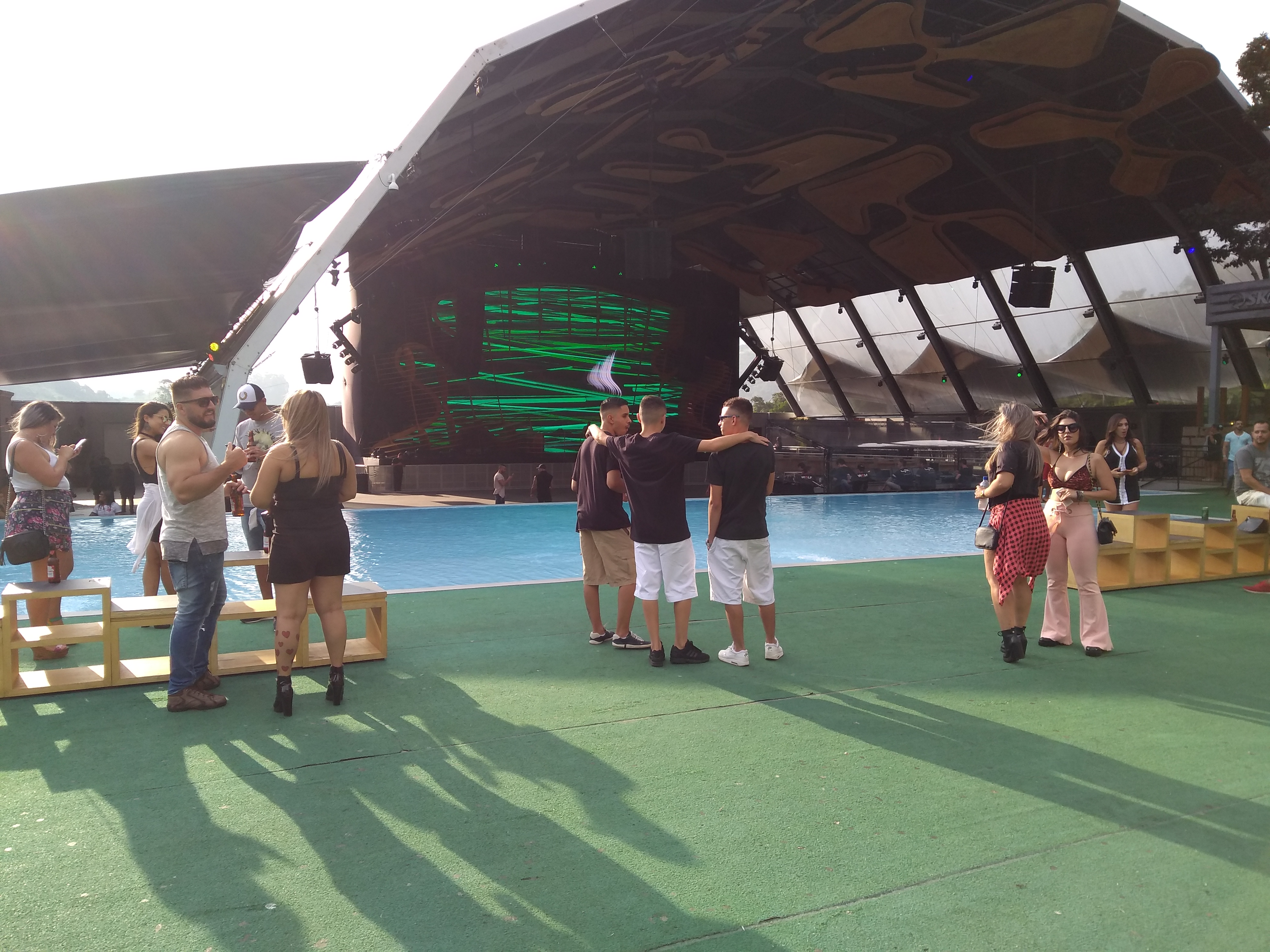
- Laroc Club In 2018
- Location: Valinhos, Brazil
- Owner: Mario Sergio de Albuquerque, Silvio Soldera and Fauze Abdouch
- Capacity: 5000
- Type: Nightclub, Music venue
- Event: Dance Music

Construction
- Opened: 2015

Laroc Club is an open air superclub in Valinhos, Brazil. Occupying an area of approximately 500,000 square feet of space, Laroc is capable of hosting up to 5,000 guests. The club is a venue for EDM and other dance music with performances by artists including Armin van Buuren, Hardwell, Alok, Vintage Culture, Axwell, and others. Laroc Club is currently ranked 9 at the DJ Mag´s Top 100 Clubs.

== History ==
Founded by Mario Sergio de Albuquerque, Silvio Soldera and Fauze Abdouch, Laroc Club first opened in October 2015. The opening night featured Nicky Romero as the headliner artist.

== Affiliated clubs ==
In 2018 Laroc Club opened an affiliate club in Valinhos, Brazil named Ame Club. The opening night featured Joris Voorn as the headliner artist.

== Awards and nominations ==
=== DJ Magazine's top 100 Clubs ===
Year	Position	Notes	Ref.
2017	45	—N/a	
2018	29	—N/a	
2019	25	—N/a	
2020	18	—N/a	
2021	12	—N/a	
2022	09	—N/a	
