= Whiskey and Coke =

Highball cocktail

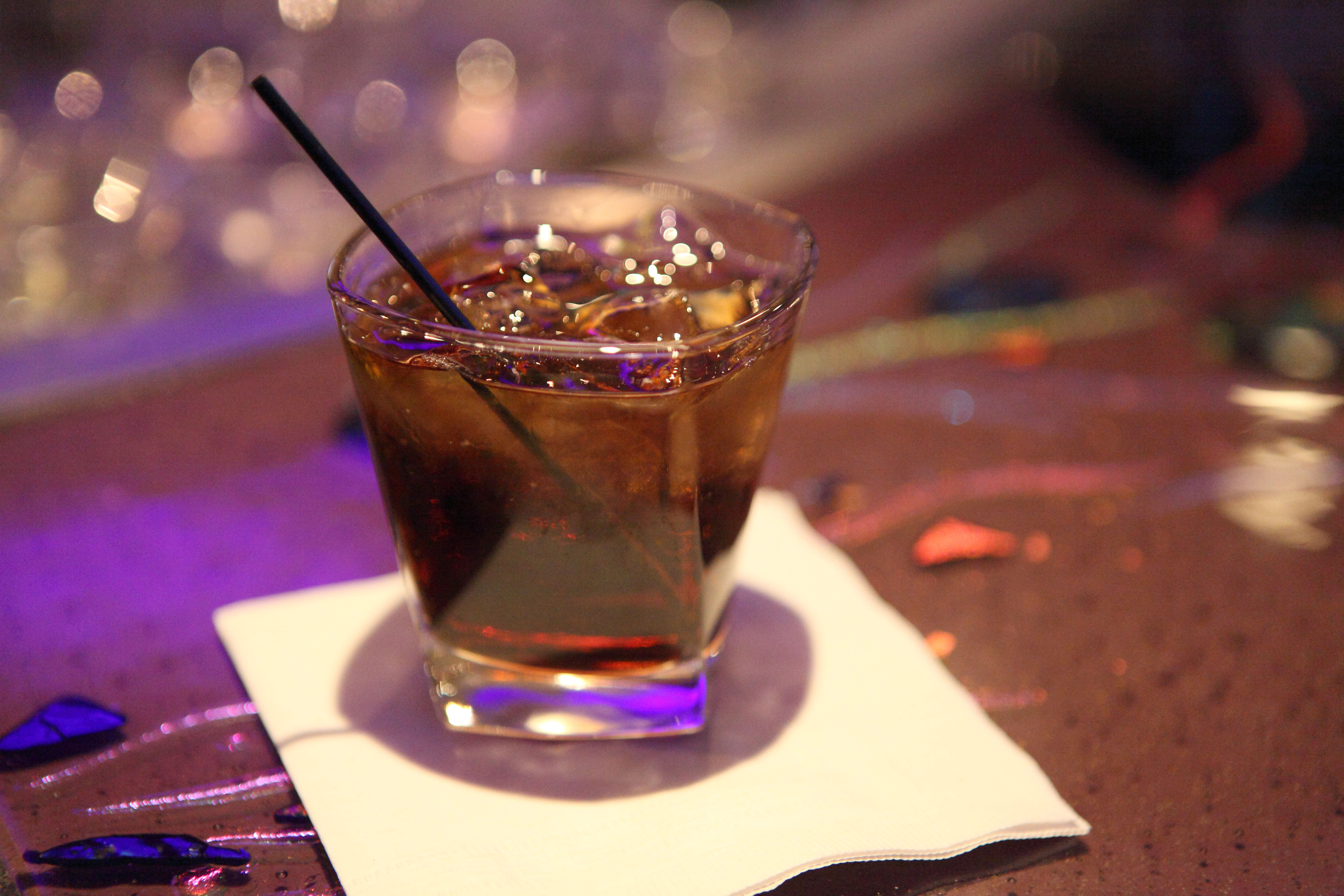
- A typical Jack and Coke
- Type: Highball
- Ingredients: 1 part whiskey; 3–5 parts Coca-Cola (strength dependent); Ice
- Base spirit: Whiskey
- Standard drinkware: Collins glass
- Served: On the rocks: poured over ice
- Preparation: Pour whiskey into a Collins glass filled with ice. Fill to desired level with Coca-Cola. Stir lightly.

Whiskey and Coke is a highball cocktail made by mixing whiskey, typically bourbon or Tennessee whiskey, with Coca-Cola or other colas. A popular version of the drink is Jack and Coke (also referred to as JD and Coke or Jack Coke), where Jack Daniel's brand of whiskey is used. The drink is especially popular in the American South. The drink is generally served with ice – sometimes in an old fashioned glass or a Collins glass, and sometimes in less-expensive containers such as Solo Cups. When bourbon is used, it is often called bourbon and Coke, or more generically, bourbon and cola.

== History ==
The first known mention of a drink made by mixing whiskey with Coke was in a 1907 report of an employee of the United States Bureau of Chemistry and Soils, who encountered the drink when visiting the South, and said the proprietor called it a "Coca-Cola high-ball". Bourbon and Coke would grow to become a common starting point for introducing novice drinkers to bourbon, according to Dave Pickerell, a former master distiller of the Maker's Mark brand of bourbon.

According to Massachusetts Beverage Business in 2005, the popularity of the Jack and Coke combination was on the rise among 21- to 34-year-olds. Mike Keyes, Jack Daniel's Senior Vice President and Global Brand Director, was quoted in 2007 as saying that "Over time, more of Jack Daniel's is being consumed with mixers, such as Coca-Cola."

In 2016, after the death of Lemmy, the lead vocalist and bassist of the English rock band Motörhead, his fans began a campaign to rename the cocktail after him, due to his prominent and frequent consumption of the drink. On January 12, 2016, Food and Beverage magazine said they had officially named the Jack and Coke combination "The Lemmy".

== Marketing ==
The term "Jack and Coke" was used in 2008 and has since seen combined advertising for Jack Daniel's and Coca-Cola, and several products were created as part of this marketing campaign, including bar signs and taps. Around 1996, Jack Daniel's released a canned beverage called "Jack Daniel's and Cola", a mixed beverage of the same type as Jack and Coke, in several markets in the South Pacific, including Australia and New Zealand.

In 2022, Jack Daniel's and Coca-Cola announced the planned release of a ready to drink (RTD) canned cocktail.

== Variations ==
- When bourbon whiskey is used, it is often called bourbon and Coke, or more generically, bourbon and cola.
- When rye whiskey is used, the cocktail may be called rye and Coke.

== See also ==
- Piscola, a similarly constructed cocktail made of pisco and cola
- Rum and Coke, a similarly constructed cocktail made of rum and cola
