= Remember (Gryffin and Zohara song) =

Single by Gryffin and Zohara

from the album Gravity
- Released: October 26, 2018
- Genre: Progressive house, deep house, dance-pop
- Length: 3:41
- Label: Darkroom; Geffen
- Songwriters: Daniel Griffith; Rachel Salvit; Jenna Andrews; Diederik van Elsas; Parrish Warrington
- Producers: Gryffin; Trackside (co.); Mark Ralph (add.)

Gryffin singles chronology
"Tie Me Down" (2018)	"Remember" (2018)	"Bye Bye" (2019)

"Remember" is a song by American DJ Gryffin and singer Zohara (also known as Rachel Salvit), released on October 26, 2018, through Darkroom and Geffen Records. It was released as the second single from Gryffin's EP Gravity: Part I and forthcoming album Gravity. It reached number one on the US Dance Club Songs chart in its issue dated February 23, 2019.

== Background ==
Gryffin stated that he heard the demo of "Remember" recorded by Zohara and "immediately thought it'd be cool to flip it into a house record".

== Critical reception ==
Kat Bein of Billboard said the song has an "energetic, funky club floor feeling". Rachel Narozniak of Dancing Astronaut claimed the song "represents Gryffin's stride further into pop territory", describing it as "lyrically confessional and tonally upbeat" as well as a "dance worthy, sing-a-long friendly number that visualizes bittersweet reminiscence on prior romance through a lighthearted lens". An article by edm.com's staff found that "Gryffin's effervescent and vaguely tropical brand of house shines through" on the song, while Zohara’s "radio-ready vocal reinforces the single's melancholic chord progression".

== Charts ==
=== Weekly charts ===
Chart (2018–2019)	Peak position
US Dance Club Songs (Billboard)	1
US Hot Dance/Electronic Songs (Billboard)	22

=== Year-end charts ===
Chart (2019)	Position
US Dance Club Songs (Billboard)	4
US Hot Dance/Electronic Songs (Billboard)	68

== See also ==
- List of Billboard number-one dance songs of 2019
