= Icona Pop discography =

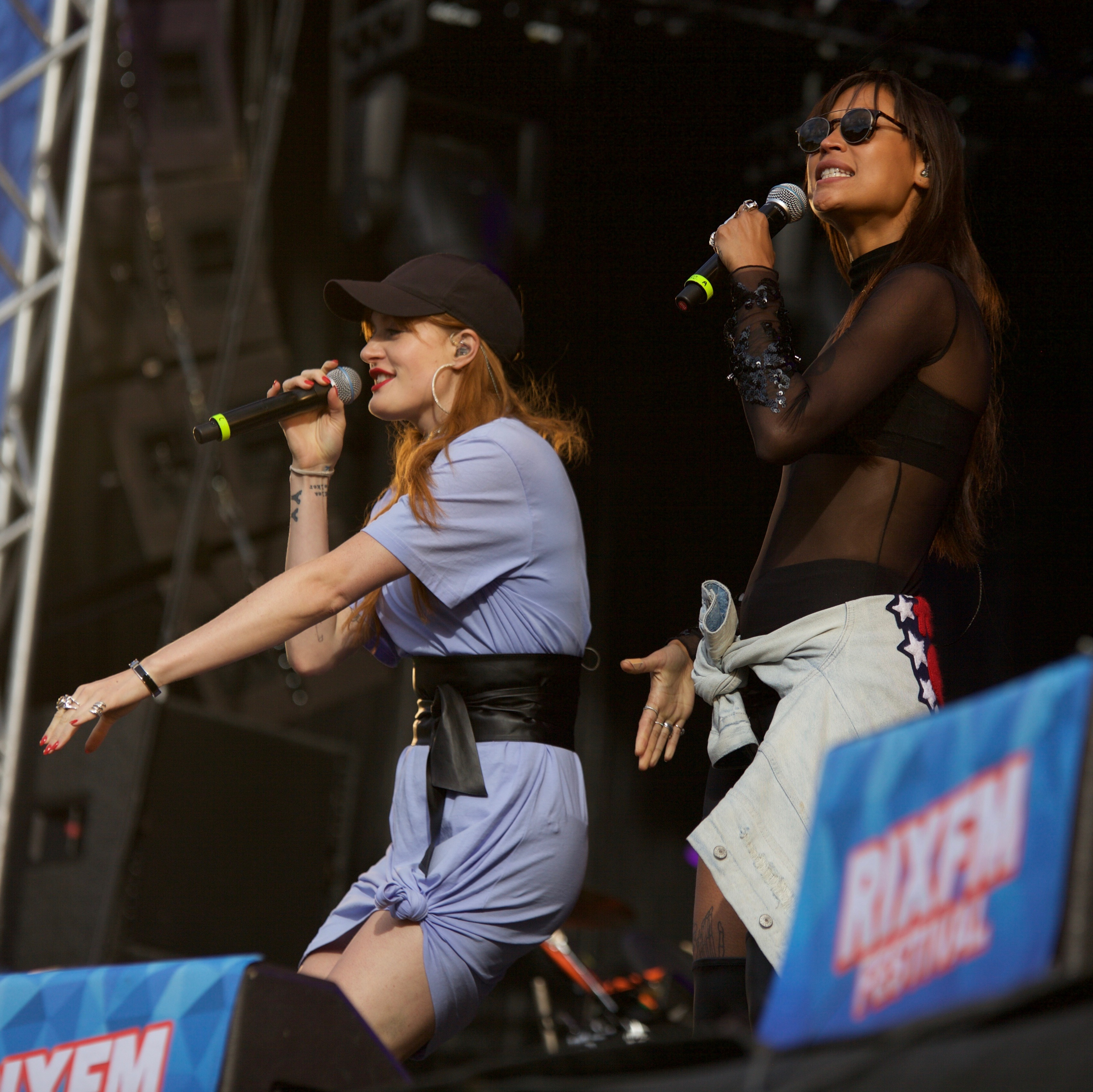
- Icona Pop performing at the Gothenburg Rix FM Festival in 2017.
- Studio albums: 4
- EPs: 5
- Singles: 22
- Music videos: 13

The Swedish duo Icona Pop has released three studio albums, four extended plays and twenty two singles. In 2012, they released an extended play Iconic in the US and the album Icona Pop in Sweden. Their song. "I Love It", a pre-release of their self-titled album Icona Pop charted on Sverigetopplistan, the official Swedish singles chart. On 20 September 2013, Icona Pop released their second studio album, a revised edition of Icona Pop, This Is... Icona Pop.

== Studio albums ==
Title	Album details	Peak chart positions							
Title	Album details	SWE	AUS	FRA	GER	IRE	SWI	UK	US
Icona Pop	Released: 14 November 2012; Label: TEN, Mercury, Universal; Formats: CD, digital download, LP	55	—	—	—	—	—	—	—
This Is... Icona Pop	Released: 20 September 2013; Label: TEN, Big Beat; Formats: CD, digital download, LP	—	62	185	99	65	46	86	36
Club Romantech	Released: 1 September 2023; Label: TEN, Ultra; Formats: Digital download	—	—	—	—	—	—	—	—
Ritual	Released: 14 August 2026; Label: TEN, Ultra; Formats: Digital download	—	—	—	—	—	—	—	—

== Extended plays ==
Title	EP details	Peak chart positions			
Title	EP details	SWE	US	US Heat.	US Dance
Nights Like This	Released: 10 October 2011; Label: TEN; Formats: 7", digital download	—	—	—	—
Iconic	Released: 1 August 2012; Label: TEN; Formats: CD, digital download	—	171	3	6
iTunes Festival: London 2013	Released: 27 August 2013; Label: TEN, Atlantic, Warner; Formats: Digital download	—	—	—	—
Emergency	Released: 17 July 2015; Label: TEN, Atlantic, Warner; Formats: CD, digital download	—	—	—	—
Så mycket bättre 2017 – Tolkningarna	Released: 29 December 2017; Label: TEN; Formats: Digital download	39	—	—	—

== Singles ==
=== As lead artist ===
List of singles as lead artist, with selected chart positions and certifications, showing year released and album name
Title	Year	Peak chart positions										Certifications	Album
Title	Year	SWE	AUS	AUT	CAN	GER	IRE	SWI	UK	US	US Dance/ Elec.	Certifications	Album
"Manners"	2011	—	—	—	—	—	—	—	—	—	—		Icona Pop
"I Love It" (featuring Charli XCX)	2012	2	3	3	9	3	8	10	1	7	1	GLF: 6× Platinum; ARIA: 7× Platinum; BPI: 3× Platinum; BVMI: 3× Gold; IFPI AUT: Platinum; IFPI SWI: Platinum; MC: 5× Platinum; RIAA: 5× Platinum; RMNZ: Gold	Icona Pop and This Is... Icona Pop
"We Got the World"	2012	29	—	—	—	—	—	—	—	—	—		Icona Pop and This Is... Icona Pop
"Girlfriend"	2013	57	55	27	—	17	—	73	—	—	—	GLF: Gold	This Is... Icona Pop
"All Night"	2013	—	65	43	57	66	20	75	31	— (Note: "All Night" did not enter the Billboard Hot 100, but peaked at number 11 on the Bubbling Under Hot 100 chart.)	13	MC: Gold; RIAA: Gold	This Is... Icona Pop
"Just Another Night"	2014	—	—	—	—	—	—	—	—	—	41		This Is... Icona Pop
"Get Lost"	2014	58	—	—	—	—	—	—	—	—	34		Non-album single
"Emergency"	2015	19	—	—	99	—	—	—	—	—	—	GLF: 2× Platinum	Emergency EP
"Someone Who Can Dance"	2016	56	—	—	—	—	—	—	—	—	21		Non-album singles
"Brightside"	2016	82	—	—	—	—	—	—	—	—	—		Non-album singles
"Girls Girls"	2017	53	—	—	—	—	—	—	—	—	—	GLF: Gold	Non-album singles
"Det måste gå"	2017	61	—	—	—	—	—	—	—	—	—		Så mycket bättre 2017 – Tolkningarna
"They're Building Walls Around Us"	2017	39	—	—	—	—	—	—	—	—	—		Så mycket bättre 2017 – Tolkningarna
"Not Too Young"	2017	55	—	—	—	—	—	—	—	—	—		Så mycket bättre 2017 – Tolkningarna
"Heart in the Air"	2017	70	—	—	—	—	—	—	—	—	—		Så mycket bättre 2017 – Tolkningarna
"Rhythm in My Blood"	2018	—	—	—	—	—	—	—	—	—	—		Non-album singles
"Next Mistake"	2019	—	—	—	—	—	—	—	—	—	—		Non-album singles
"Right Time" (with Hayden James)	2020	—	—	—	—	—	—	—	—	—	34		Non-album singles
"Feels in My Body"	2020	—	—	—	—	—	—	—	—	—	— (Note: "Feels in My Body" did not enter the US Dance/Electronic Songs chart, but did peak at number 16 on the Dance/Electronic Digital Song Sales chart.)		Club Romantech
"Spa" (with Sofi Tukker)	2020	—	—	—	—	—	—	—	—	—	30		Club Romantech
"Off of My Mind" (with Vize)	2021	— (Note: "Off of My Mind" did not enter the Sverigetopplistan, but peaked at number one on the Swedish Heatseeker chart.)	—	—	—	—	—	—	—	—	—		Club Romantech
"You're Free" (with Ultra Naté)	2022	—	—	—	—	—	—	—	—	—	—		Club Romantech
"I Want You" (with Galantis)	2023	—	—	—	—	—	—	—	—	—	—		Club Romantech
"Faster"	2023	—	—	—	—	—	—	—	—	—	—		Club Romantech
"Shit We Do for Love" (with Yaeger)	2023	—	—	—	—	—	—	—	—	—	—		Club Romantech
"Where Do We Go from Here"	2023	—	—	—	—	—	—	—	—	—	—		Club Romantech
"Desire" (with Joel Corry and Rain Radio)	2023	—	—	—	—	—	—	—	—	—	—		Another Friday Night and Club Romantech
"Fall in Love"	2023	—	—	—	—	—	—	—	—	—	—		Club Romantech
"Tears on the Dancefloor"	2023	—	—	—	—	—	—	—	—	—	—		Club Romantech
"Body Type" (with Badger)	2024	—	—	—	—	—	—	—	—	—	—		Non-album single
"Ritual" (with Daya)	2026	—	—	—	—	—	—	—	—	—	—		Ritual
"Dance to This"	2026	—	—	—	—	—	—	—	—	—	—		Ritual
"—" denotes a recording that did not chart or was not released in that territory.

=== As featured artist ===
List of singles as featured artist, with selected chart positions, showing year released and album name
Title	Year	Peak chart positions						Certifications	Album
Title	Year	AUS	NZ	UK	US Bub.	US Adult Pop	US Electronic	Certifications	Album
"Mind Your Manners" (Chiddy Bang featuring Icona Pop)	2011	11	32	—	15	—	—	ARIA: 2× Platinum	Breakfast
"Let's Go" (Tiësto featuring Icona Pop)	2014	—	—	—	—	—	30		A Town Called Paradise
"Never Been in Love" (Cobra Starship featuring Icona Pop)	2014	66	—	—	—	36	—		Non-album singles
"Ride" (Lowell featuring Icona Pop)	2015	—	—	—	—	—	—		Non-album singles
"Weekend" (Louis the Child featuring Icona Pop)	2016	—	—	—	—	—	—	RIAA: Gold	Non-album singles
"Windows" (Felix Snow featuring Icona Pop)	2016	—	—	—	—	—	—		Non-album singles
"Let You Down" (Peking Duk featuring Icona Pop)	2017	37	—	—	—	—	—	ARIA: 2× Platinum	Non-album singles
"Faded Away" (Sweater Beats featuring Icona Pop)	2018	—	—	—	—	—	—		Non-album singles
"Bitches" (Tove Lo featuring Charli XCX, Icona Pop, Elliphant and Alma)	2018	—	—	—	—	—	—		Lady Wood and Blue Lips (Deluxe)
"You Don't Know About Me" (The ACLU Remix) (Ella Vos, Icona Pop and Vérité featuring Mija)	2018	—	—	—	—	—	—		Non-album singles
"X's" (Grx and CMC$ featuring Icona Pop)	2018	—	—	—	—	—	36		Non-album singles
"Sink Deeper" (Moti featuring Icona Pop)	2019	—	—	—	—	—	—		Non-album singles
"We Got That Cool" (Yves V and Afrojack featuring Icona Pop)	2019	—	—	68	—	—	—	BPI: Silver	Non-album singles
"Freak on Me" (Ricky Retro featuring Icona Pop)	2019	—	—	—	—	—	—		Non-album singles
"Louder" (Big Freedia featuring Icona Pop)	2019	—	—	—	—	—	—		Louder
"I Love My Friends" (Steve Aoki featuring Icona Pop)	2020	—	—	—	—	—	—		Neon Future IV
"Payback" (Cheat Codes featuring Icona Pop)	2022	—	—	—	—	—	—		Hellraisers, Pt. 3
"—" denotes a recording that did not chart or was not released in that territory.

=== Promotional singles ===
Title	Year	Peak chart positions	Album
Title	Year	US Dance	Album
"Ready for the Weekend"	2012	—	Icona Pop and This Is... Icona Pop
"In the Stars"	2013	22	This Is... Icona Pop
"My Party" (featuring Ty Dolla Sign)	2014	— (Note: "My Party" did not enter the US Dance/Electronic Songs chart, but did peak at number 42 on the Dance/Electronic Digital Song Sales chart.)	Icona Pop
"F U"	2016	—	Non-album single

== Other charted songs ==
List of other charted songs, with selected chart positions, showing year of charting and album name
Title	Year	Peak chart positions	Album
Title	Year	SWE	Album
"Stick Your Tongue Out"	2023	91	Club Romantech

== Other appearances ==
List of non-single guest appearances, with other performing artists, showing year released and album name
Title	Other artist(s)	Year	Album
"Let's Go"	Tiësto	2014	A Town Called Paradise
"Move Your Feet/D.A.N.C.E./It's a Sunshine Day"	Anna Kendrick, Gwen Stefani, James Corden, Ron Funches, Walt Dohrn, and Kunal Nayyar	2016	Trolls: Original Motion Picture Soundtrack
"I'm Coming Out/Mo Money Mo Problems"	Zooey Deschanel, Anna Kendrick, Gwen Stefani, James Corden, Walt Dohrn, Ron Funches, and Kunal Nayyar	2016	Trolls: Original Motion Picture Soundtrack
"Can't Stop the Feeling" (Film version)	Justin Timberlake, Anna Kendrick, Gwen Stefani, James Corden, Zooey Deschanel, Walt Dohrn, Ron Funches, Christopher Mintz-Plasse, and Kunal Nayyar	2016	Trolls: Original Motion Picture Soundtrack
"Trolls Wanna Have Good Times"	Anna Kendrick, Justin Timberlake, James Corden, Esther Dean, Kenan Thompson, and the Pop Trolls	2020	Trolls World Tour: Original Motion Picture Soundtrack
"Trolls 2 Many Hits Mashup"	Anna Kendrick, Justin Timberlake, James Corden, and the Pop Trolls	2020	Trolls World Tour: Original Motion Picture Soundtrack
"Just Sing"	Anna Kendrick, Justin Timberlake, James Corden, Kelly Clarkson, George Clinton, Mary J. Blige, Anderson Paak, Rachel Bloom, Kenan Thompson, Anthony Ramos, Red Velvet, and Sam Rockwell	2020	Trolls World Tour: Original Motion Picture Soundtrack

== Music videos ==
Title	Year	Director
"Manners"	2011	Johannes Ring
"Nights Like This"	2011	Tim Erem
"I Love It"	2012	Fredrik Etoall
"We Got the World"	2012	Fredrik Etoall
"Girlfriend"	2013	Tim Nackashi
"All Night"	2013	Dori Oskowitz
"Just Another Night"	2013	Marc Klasfeld
"On a Roll"	2014	Gary Coogan
"Sun Goes Down" (featuring The Knocks and St. Lucia)	2014	unknown
"Emergency"	2015	Christian Larson
"Weekend"	2016	RJ Sanchez
"Brightside"	2016	Christine Juan
"All My Girls"	2018	unknown
