= Never Been in Love =

Single by Cobra Starship featuring Icona Pop
- Released: August 25, 2014
- Recorded: 2014
- Genre: Dance rock; pop rock; arena rock; synthpop
- Length: 3:42
- Label: Fueled by Ramen; Decaydance; Warner Bros.
- Songwriters: Gabe Saporta; Camille Yarbrough; Norman Cook; Ricky Reed; John Ryan
- Producers: Ricky Reed; John Ryan

Cobra Starship singles chronology
| "#1Nite (One Night)" (2012) | "Never Been in Love" (2014) | "Beautiful Life" (2021) |

Icona Pop singles chronology
| "Get Lost" (2014) | "Never Been in Love" (2014) | "Emergency" (2015) |

"Never Been in Love" is a song by American pop rock band Cobra Starship. It was released on August 25, 2014, and features vocals from Swedish synth-pop duo Icona Pop. The song was the band's first single since their 2012 single "1Nite (One Night)" and was intended to be the lead single for their fifth studio album.

== Background ==
Following the release of their third studio album Night Shades (2011), vocalist Gabe Saporta took a small break from the band as he got married and reunited with his old band Midtown. In 2013, Saporta found himself thinking of reviving Cobra Starship again and wanted to do things differently. Saporta had been listening to a lot of stuff from the early '90s from UK artists such as Happy Mondays, Stone Roses, Jesus Jones and George Michael, which led to the development of "Never Been in Love". On August 22, 2014, the group announced that the song would be released on August 25, featuring a collaboration with Icona Pop. The duo got in contact with Cobra Starship following Saporta's remix to their hit single, "I Love It" with Charli XCX.

== Composition ==
"Never Been in Love" is a dance pop and pop rock song that lasts for three minutes and forty two seconds and is a departure from the group's usual electropop sound. The song is set in common time with a tempo of 121 beats per minute is in the key of C major, with a chord progression of C-G-D, and Bb-F-C-G in the bridge and outro. It was written by Gabe Saporta, Camille Yarbrough, Norman Cook, Ricky Reed and John Ryan. Reed and Saporta wrote the line "I know now, I've never been in love before!" after realizing "they'd truly fallen in love." The song was inspired after Saporta's marriage to his wife Erin Fetherston. The track borrowed a prominent piano melody from Fatboy Slim's 1999 single "Praise You".

== Music video ==
The music video for "Never Been in Love" premiered on October 25, 2014. The video was directed by German photographer Ellen von Unwerth. It was shot during Saporta's first trip in Sweden showing footage of him and Icona Pop performing the song in black and white.

== Track listing ==
Digital download
| No. | Title | Length |
|---|---|---|
| 1. | "Never Been in Love" | 3:42 |

== Charts ==
Chart performance for "Never Been in Love"
| Chart (2014–2015) | Peak position |
|---|---|
| Australia (ARIA) | 66 |
| Belgium (Ultratip Bubbling Under Flanders) | 64 |
| CIS Airplay (TopHit) | 159 |
| Czech Republic Airplay (ČNS IFPI) | 80 |
| Italy (Musica e Dischi) | 27 |
| Netherlands (Dutch Top 40 Tipparade) | 5 |
| US Adult Pop Airplay (Billboard) | 36 |
| US Pop Digital Song Sales (Billboard) | 47 |

== Release history ==
"Never Been in Love" release history
| Region | Date | Format(s) | Label(s) | Ref. |
|---|---|---|---|---|
| Various | August 25, 2014 | Digital download; streaming | Fueled by Ramen; Decaydance; Warner Bros. | |
| United States | September 9, 2014 | Mainstream airplay | Roadrunner | |
| Italy | October 30, 2014 | Radio airplay | Warner Bros. | |
