= Get Lost (Icona Pop song) =

Single by Icona Pop
- Released: 23 June 2014
- Recorded: 2014
- Genre: EDM; dance
- Length: 2:56
- Label: TEN
- Songwriter(s): Anjulie Persaud; Go Grizzly; Kevin Adam Price; Aino Jawo; Caroline Hjelt
- Producer(s): Go Grizzly

Icona Pop singles chronology
| "Let's Go" (2014) | "Get Lost" (2014) | "Never Been in Love" (2014) |

"Get Lost" is a song by Swedish synth-pop duo Icona Pop released as a single on June 23, 2014, by TEN Music Group in Sweden where it peaked at number 58 on the weekly singles chart. It is the first musical work published by the duo after their debut album "This Is... Icona Pop".

== Composition ==
"Get Lost" is a EDM and dance song with a tempo of 128 beats per minute. The chorus contains prolonged vocals and the bridge is made of anthemic howls. The lyrics speak about free life and they are characterized by punky expressions and shouts similar to those of their hit "I Love It". The duo cited Miley Cyrus as a source of inspiration in an interview with E! News in their pursuit of success, calling her very able to balance work and play. They said Miley "would never risk a show by going out" and is "down-to-earth," "hardworking" and "very professional."

== Critical reception ==
The critics praised the song calling it "undeniably effective", but also "not enough different from their other hits". Stereogum defined it as a gleaming weapons-grade hook-delivery machine with a chorus that sounds bigger than the known universe. Speaking about it, SPIN reviewed the song saying that "Some will balk at the totemic, EDM-flavored synth parts that function as the building blocks of this song, but the sweetness of the duo's gang vocals more than round off those sonic jagged edges" Idolator.com called "Get Lost" the "stuff of rebellious and youthful gold, as the girls escape the world in a sea of storming beats and battle cries".

== Music video ==
The official lyric video for "Get Lost" was premiered on YouTube on July 14, 2014. It was directed by Paul Jerndal. A live performance of the song was released on VEVO on September 22, 2014.

== Chart performance ==
| Chart (2014) | Peak position |
|---|---|
| Sweden (Sverigetopplistan) | 58 |
| US Dance Club Songs (Billboard) | 34 |
