= In the Stars =

In the Stars may refer to:

- "In the Stars" (Ugly Betty), an episode of Ugly Betty
- "In the Stars" (Star Wars: Visions)
- "In the Stars" (Icona Pop song), released in 2013
- "In the Stars" (Benson Boone song), released in 2022
- ""In the Stars" (Rolling Stones song), from Foreign Tongues (2026)
- "In the Stars", a song by One Ok Rock from Eye of the Storm
