= Hiroquest: Genesis =

Studio album by Steve Aoki
- Released: September 16, 2022
- Length: 71:20
- Label: Dim Mak; DJ Kid Millionaire
- Producer: Steve Aoki (exec.); Aaron Harmon; Alessandro Martello; Andrew Migliore; DJ Aligator; Dr Phunk; Elaf Loelv; Emanuele Longo; Evan Gartner; Joe Kirkland; John Feldmann; Jordan Baum; Lewis Thompson; Mason Sacks; Max Styler; Michael Gazzo; Mick Kastenholt; Mike Mac; Neave Applebaum; Nils Ruzicka; Ricky Retro; Tiago da Cal Alves; Timothy Smith; Vitali Zestovskih

Steve Aoki chronology
Neon Future IV (2020)	Hiroquest: Genesis (2022)	Hiroquest 2: Double Helix (2023)

Singles from Hiroquest: Genesis
- 1. "Stars Don't Shine" Released: December 17, 2021; 2. "Kult" Released: February 18, 2022; 3. "Stop The World" Released: March 18, 2022; 4. "Save Me" Released: April 29, 2022; 5. "Kong 2.0" Released: May 13, 2022; 6. "Just Us Two" Released: June 10, 2022; 7. "Whole Again" Released: July 1, 2022; 8. "The Whistle" Released: August 5, 2022; 9. "Ultimate" Released: August 26, 2022; 10. "Nobody" Released: September 15, 2022; 11. "Demons" Released: September 15, 2022; 12. "All Hype" Released: September 15, 2022; 13. "Stars" Released: September 15, 2022; 14. "Movie Star" Released: September 15, 2022; 15. "Chi Chi" Released: September 15, 2022

Hiroquest: Genesis is the seventh studio album by American DJ and producer Steve Aoki, succeeding his 2020 album Neon Future IV. The album is a result of Aoki's partnership with collectible card game company MetaZoo Games, with whom he released an accompanying trading card game pack where one random card shipped with every CD sold. The album was released on September 16, 2022.

== Background ==
According to Aoki, "the music is a connecting tissue to this universe that I'm creating. This album tells a fantastical story, but it's also about freedom from restraint. I went right back to my roots—that raw, rock energy and that became the basis of it. From there, I began to explore everything and it sprouted into so many different genres."

Hiroquest: Genesis was released on September 16, 2022, through DJ Kid Millionaire and Dim Mak Records. It contains collaborations with Jasiah, Grandson, Mod Sun, Global Dan, Kane Brown, Ricky Retro, Taking Back Sunday, Bryce Vine, Goody Grace, Sueco, No Love for the Middle Child, Santa Fe Klan, Snow Tha Product, Guaynaa, Natanael Cano, KAAZE, John Martin, HRVY, Marnik, Leony, Timmy Trumpet, DJ Aligator, PollyAnna, Georgia Ku, Lil Xan, PnB Rock, and 24hrs.

=== Concept and structure ===
Hiroquest: Genesis can be described as a concept album, as it follows a main character named Hiro, who exists as a dramatization of Aoki, who embarks on an introspective journey to collect magical rings described in the Black Pullet grimoire, which he must use to save the world.

The album is divided into factions by five interludes called "melodias". The characters in the trading card game each correspond to one of the five factions.

The album is the first in Aoki's Hiroquest series of albums. The second installment, Hiroquest 2: Double Helix, was released on November 17, 2023.

== Remix album ==
Aoki later released a twenty-seven track remixed version of the album, entitled Hiroquest: Genesis Remixed, on November 11, 2022. The remixed version of the songs were produced mainly by artists that did not appear on the original project, though it did feature production by Aoki (on the remix of "Just Us Two") and by Timmy Trumpet (on the remix of "Hiroquest Anthem").

== Tour ==
The album spawned a tour, the Hiroquest: Genesis Tour, which begun on February 22, 2023, in Montreal, Canada, and ended on March 16 in New York City.

== Artwork ==
The album cover was illustrated by MetaZoo artist Poncho.

== Track listing ==
Hiroquest: Genesis track listing
No.	Title	Writer(s)	Length
1.	"Hiroquest Anthem"	Steve Aoki	3:18
2.	"Astrals Melodia"	Aoki	0:42
3.	"Kult" (with Grandson featuring Jasiah)	Aoki; Jordan Benjamin; Jordan Baum; Michael Gazzo; Mike Mac	2:57
4.	"Movie Star" (featuring Mod Sun and Global Dan)	Aoki; Daniel McMannis; Dell Ngonga; Derek Smith; Gazzo	3:33
5.	"Move On" (with Kane Brown and Ricky Retro)	Aoki; Jesse Frasure; Kane Brown; Matt McGinn; Ricky Retro	3:11
6.	"OIO Melodia"	Aoki	0:34
7.	"Just Us Two" (with Taking Back Sunday)	Aoki; Adam Lazzara; John Nolan; Mark O'Connell; Gazzo; Shaun Cooper	3:48
8.	"All Hype" (featuring Bryce Vine)	Aoki; Joe Kirkland; Aaron Harmon; Bryce Vine; Dusty Kessler	3:16
9.	"You Don't Get to Hate Me" (featuring Goody Grace)	Aoki; Benjamin Shapiro; Benny Mayne; Evan Gartner; Branson Gudmundson; Mason Sacks; Gazzo; Miles Wesley	2:58
10.	"Russian Roulette" (featuring Sueco and No Love for the Middle Child)	Aoki; William Schultz; Andrew Migliore; John Feldmann; Gazzo	2:39
11.	"Diasos Melodia"	Aoki	0:35
12.	"Ultimate" (with Santa Fe Klan featuring Snow Tha Product)	Aoki; Max Styler; Claudia Madriz Meza; Ángel Quezada	3:33
13.	"Chi Chi" (with Guaynaa)	Aoki; Elof Loelv; Jean Carlos Santiago Perez; Oplus; Tiago da Cal Alves	3:30
14.	"Kong 2.0" (with Natanael Cano)	Aoki; Natanael Cano; Andres Farias	3:22
15.	"Extants Melodia"	Aoki	0:42
16.	"Whole Again" (with Kaaze featuring John Martin)	Aoki; Daniel Ledinsky; John Martin; Michel Zitron; Mick Kastenholt	3:30
17.	"Save Me" (with Hrvy)	Aoki; Lewis Thompson; Gabrielle Alpin; Harvey Cantwell; Lawrie Prime-Martin; Max Styler	2:46
18.	"Stop the World" (with Marnik and Leony)	Aoki; Emanuele Longo; Leonie Burger; Vitali Zestovskih	2:59
19.	"The Whistle" (with Timmy Trumpet and DJ Aligator)	Aoki; Al Agami; Timothy Smith; Ali Movasat; Casper Weinrich; Hoger Lagerfeldt	2:11
20.	"Stars Don't Shine" (featuring Global Dan)	Aoki; Max Styler; Gazzo	3:41
21.	"Taurobons Melodia"	Aoki	0:45
22.	"Nobody" (featuring PollyAnna)	Aoki; Gazzo; Nils Ruzicka; Britt Pols	3:01
23.	"Demons" (featuring Georgia Ku)	Aoki; Albin Nedler; Bonn; Georgia Ku; Jim Levine	2:46
24.	"Stars" (featuring Lil Xan)	Aoki; Nicholas Diego Leanos	3:05
25.	"Perfect" (featuring PnB Rock and 24hrs)	Aoki; Rakim Allen; Robert Davis III	4:04
26.	"Black Pullet"	Aoki	4:03
Total length:			71:20

Notes

- "Russian Roulette" contains an interpolation of "Funeral" by Sueco.
- "Perfect" was silently removed from streaming services shortly after the album's release, though it is still present on physical copies. Later, it was reissued as part of Aoki's album Hiroquest 2: Double Helix (2023).
- "Black Pullet" runs for 3:29 on streaming services, compared to the standard 4:03 on physical editions.
