= Talk About =

Talk About may refer to:

- "Talk About" (song), a 2021 song by Rain Radio and DJ Craig Gorman
- "Talk About", a song by Labi Siffre from The Singer and the Song, 1971
- Talk About (game show), a Canadian TV series that began in 1988
