= Just Another Night (Icona Pop song) =

Single by Icona Pop

from the album This Is... Icona Pop
- Released: 28 January 2014
- Recorded: 2013
- Length: 3:09 (album version)
- Label: TEN; Big Beat
- Songwriters: Mikkel Eriksen; Tor Erik Hermansen; Benjamin Levin; Daniel Omelio; Justin Parker; Ross Golan
- Producers: StarGate; Benny Blanco

Icona Pop singles chronology
| "All Night" (2013) | "Just Another Night" (2014) | "Let's Go" (2014) |

"Just Another Night" is a song by Swedish synth-pop duo Icona Pop. It was released worldwide on 28 January 2014 as a digital download. The music video was directed by Marc Klasfeld in black and white located in Paris.

== Music video ==
The black-and-white music video for the song was directed by Marc Klasfeld and shot in Paris. The video begins with a French woman explaining how "2 Swedish girls" fell for "1 Italian man" as clips are interlaced. The plot follows the division between the duo as they are both in love with the same man, who, in the end, leaves both of them for another woman. The video is heavily influenced by film noir and has vintage 1960s elements.

== Track listing ==
Digital download
| No. | Title | Length |
|---|---|---|
| 1. | "Just Another Night" | 3:09 |

Digital download - EP
| No. | Title | Length |
|---|---|---|
| 1. | "Just Another Night" (Radio Edit) | 2:59 |
| 2. | "Just Another Night" (Morgan Page Remix) (Radio Edit) | 3:45 |

Digital download - Remixes
| No. | Title | Length |
|---|---|---|
| 1. | "Just Another Night" (Marcus Schössow Remix) | 5:30 |
| 2. | "Just Another Night" (Morgan Page Remix) | 6:11 |
| 3. | "Just Another Night" (CaPa Remix) | 5:11 |
| 4. | "Just Another Night" (Faustix & Imanos Remix) | 3:04 |
| 5. | "Just Another Night" (Alex Young Remix) | 4:41 |
| 6. | "Just Another Night" (Solidisco Remix) | 5:04 |
| 7. | "Just Another Night" (Disco Fries Remix) | 5:28 |
| 8. | "Just Another Night" (NEVINS Extended Mix) | 5:39 |
| 9. | "Just Another Night" (Lucky Date Remix) | 5:09 |

Beatport Remixes
| No. | Title | Length |
|---|---|---|
| 1. | "Just Another Night" (DubVision Remix) | 5:55 |
| 2. | "Just Another Night" (Marcus Schössow Remix) | 5:30 |
| 3. | "Just Another Night" (Morgan Page Remix) | 6:11 |
| 4. | "Just Another Night" (Anthony Attalla Remix) | 6:48 |
| 5. | "Just Another Night" (CaPa Remix) | 5:11 |
| 6. | "Just Another Night" (Faustix & Imanos Remix) | 3:04 |
| 7. | "Just Another Night" (Alex Young Remix) | 4:41 |

Free download

1. "Just Another Night" (Steve Porter "Full Vocal Mix") – 4:00
2. "Just Another Night" (Steve Porter "Instrumental") – 4:15
3. "Just Another Night" (Steve Porter "Club Dub") – 4:15

== Charts ==
Chart performance for "Just Another Night"
| Chart (2014) | Peak position |
|---|---|
| US Dance Club Songs (Billboard) | 36 |
| US Hot Dance/Electronic Songs (Billboard) | 41 |
