= Iconic (EP) =

EP by Icona Pop
- Released: 1 August 2012
- Genre: Synth-pop
- Length: 18:31
- Labels: TEN; Big Beat; Warner Australia

Icona Pop chronology
Nights Like This (2011)	Iconic (2012)	Icona Pop (2012)

Iconic is the second extended play by Swedish synth-pop duo Icona Pop. It was released on 1 August 2012 through TEN Music Group. The EP was preceded by the lead single "I Love It", which scored an international hit, peaking at number one in the United Kingdom and seven in the United States.

== Critical reception ==
Professional ratings
Review scores
Source	Rating
AllMusic	3.5/5 stars
Consequence	C−
Pitchfork	7.5/10
Rolling Stone	3.5/5 stars

Heather Phares of AllMusic said Iconic "gives a good idea of where Icona Pop have been and where they're headed". Frank Mojica of Consequence said, "Icona Pop goes further than capturing the youthful sounds of 2012 on The Iconic; it's the "couldn't care less," "anything goes" spirit that's been documented". Andrew Martin of Complex said, "If you like big synths, heavy beats, and huge vocals, you're going to dig this".

Lindsay Zoladz of Pitchfork called it "a more assured collection of songs that sheds some light on what sets Icona Pop apart from their Swede-pop compatriots". Rob Sheffield of Rolling Stone noted that the duo "sound like the female half of Abba kicking Fernando downstairs in a drunken rage – or maybe Ace of Base if the sign they saw was flashing blue lights".

== Track listing ==
No.	Title	Writer(s)	Producer(s)	Length
1.	"I Love It" (featuring Charli XCX)	Charlotte Aitchison; Patrik Berger; Linus Eklöw	Style of Eye; Patrik Berger	2:37
2.	"Ready for the Weekend"	Caroline Hjelt; Aino Jawo; Elof Loelv; Tove Lo	Elof Loelv	2:42
3.	"Good for You"	Fredrik Berger; Patrik Berger; Aino Jawo; Caroline Hjelt	Tysper	3:27
4.	"Manners"	Patrik Berger; Aino Jawo; Caroline Hjelt; Fredrik Berger	Patrik Berger	3:31
5.	"Top Rated"	Fredrik Berger; Vashington; Elof Loelv	Patrik Berger	2:59
6.	"Sun Goes Down" (featuring The Knocks and St. Lucia)	Ben Ruttner; James Patterson; Aino Jawo; Caroline Hjelt; Jean-Philip Grobler	The Knocks; St. Lucia	3:15
Total length:				18:31

Australian Tour Edition bonus tracks
No.	Title	Writer(s)	Producer(s)	Length
7.	"Manners" (Style of Eye Remix)	Patrik Berger; Aino Jawo; Caroline Hjelt; Fredrik Berger	Style of Eye	6:01
8.	"I Love It" (Apocalypto Remix)	Charlotte Aitchison; Patrik Berger; Linus Eklöw	Apocalypto	6:13

== Charts ==
=== Weekly charts ===
Chart (2013)	Peak position
US Billboard 200	171
US Top Dance Albums (Billboard)	6

=== Year-end charts ===
Chart (2013)	Position
US Top Dance/Electronic Albums (Billboard)	17
