= We Got the World =

2012 single by Icona Pop

Single by Icona Pop

from the album Icona Pop and This Is... Icona Pop
- Released: 15 October 2012
- Recorded: 2012
- Genre: Synth-pop; house
- Length: 3:17
- Label: TEN
- Songwriter(s): Aino Jawo; Caroline Hjelt; Elof Loelv; Linus Eklöw; Jimmy Koitzsch; Nicole Morier; Tove Nilsson
- Producer(s): Elof Loelv

Icona Pop singles chronology
"I Love It" (2012)	"We Got the World" (2012)	"Girlfriend" (2013)

"We Got the World" is a song recorded by the Swedish synth-pop duo Icona Pop, from their debut studio album Icona Pop (2012). It was written by Aino Jawo, Caroline Hjelt, Linus Eklöw, Nicole Morier, Tove Nilsson, and its producer Elof Loelv. It was released for digital download and streaming on 15 October 2012 through TEN Music Group as the album's third single. Later the song was included on the duo's second studio album and debut international album This Is... Icona Pop (2013). The song entered the Swedish Singles Chart at number 54 and eventually peaked at number 29.

This song served as the theme song for the MTV talk show Nikki & Sara Live as well as for the 2013 CONCACAF U-20 Championship in Mexico. It is also used in a promotion video for season 13 of the Canadian teen drama show, Degrassi. In 2015, The Barden Bellas covered this song as part of the Kennedy Center Performance in the musical comedy film Pitch Perfect 2.

== Track listing ==
Digital download
No.	Title	Length
1.	"We Got the World" (Radio Edit)	3:08
2.	"We Got the World"	3:17
3.	"We Got the World" (Long Version)	3:24

== Credits and personnel ==
Credits adapted from Genius.

- Icona Pop – composition, vocals
- Elof Loelv – composition, production, programming
- Linus Eklöw – composition
- Jimmy Koitzsh – composition (uncredited)
- Nicole Morier – composition
- Tove Nilsson – composition
- Chris Gehringer – mastering
- Robert Orton – mixing

== Charts ==
Chart performance for "We Got the World"
Chart (2012)	Peak position
Sweden (Sverigetopplistan)	29

== Release history ==
Release history and formats for "We Got the World"
Region	Date	Format	Label
Sweden	15 October 2012	Digital download	TEN

== Eric Saade version ==
"We Got the World"

Song by Eric Saade

from the album Så mycket bättre – Tolkningarna
- Released: December 3, 2017
- Genre: Pop
- Length: 3:23
- Label: Roxy
- Songwriter(s): Anton Malmberg Hård Af Segerstad; Eric Saade; Niclas Lundin

In 2017, Swedish singer Eric Saade recorded the cover and rearranged version of "We Got the World" as a part of the eighth season of the Swedish reality television show, Så mycket bättre. The version was released on 3 December 2017 through Roxy Recordings. Later, the version was on their extended play, Så mycket bättre 2017 – Tolkningarna (2017), which compiles all the songs the singer performed on the show.

=== Track listings ===
Digital download
No.	Title	Length
1.	"We Got the World"	3:23

=== Release history ===
Release history for "We Got the World"
Country	Date	Format	Label
Sweden	3 December 2017	digital download	Roxy
