= Club Romantech =

Studio album by Icona Pop
- Released: 1 September 2023
- Genre: EDM-pop
- Length: 40:36
- Label: TEN; Ultra
- Producer: Bloodshy; John "J-C" Carr; Bill Coleman; Joel Corry; Nick Henriques; Jon Hume; Icona Pop; Enzo Ingrosso; Henrik Jonback; Misha K; Mark Ralph; Rain Radio; Carl Rydén; TimFromTheHouse; Ultra Naté; Jacob Werner; Yaro; Vitali Zestovskih

Icona Pop chronology
| Så mycket bättre 2017 – Tolkningarna (2017) | Club Romantech (2023) | Ritual (2026) |

Singles from Club Romantech
- 1. "Feels in My Body" Released: 7 August 2020; 2. "Spa" Released: 16 October 2020; 3. "Off of My Mind" Released: 9 July 2021; 4. "You're Free" Released: 16 June 2022; 5. "I Want You" Released: 17 February 2023; 6. "Faster" Released: 31 March 2023; 7. "Shit We Do for Love" Released: 5 May 2023; 8. "Where Do We Go from Here" Released: 23 June 2023; 9. "Desire" Released: 14 July 2023; 10. "Fall in Love" Released: 18 August 2023

Club Romantech is the third studio album by Swedish synth-pop duo Icona Pop. It was released on 1 September 2023 through Swedish independent record label TEN Music Group and Ultra. The album marks the duo's first studio release in ten years.

== Background ==
Work on the album started in 2020, when the duo was forced to sell their Los Angeles home and had to relocate back to Stockholm to quarantine. They eventually found themselves in the "quietest period" they had ever experienced in their career. However, they still wanted to create music that was "more up-tempo". Hjelt stated that the writing process had no rules. The intention was to share their vision with the fans, "inviting them" into their world. Jawo added that the duo loves to put their problems concerning "heartbreaks and sadness" in danceable "uplifting" songs.

On 23 June 2023, the duo announced the album through their social media and shared the album cover. The announcement also saw the release of the single "Where Do We Go from Here", one of the first songs written for the album in fall 2020. The album will include a set of singles released since 2020: "Feels in My Body", "Spa", "Off of My Mind", "You're Free", "I Want You", "Faster" and "Shit We Do for Love".

On 1 December 2023, the deluxe version of the album was released.

== Critical reception ==
Professional ratings
Aggregate scores
| Source | Rating |
|---|---|
| Metacritic | 75/100 |
Review scores
| Source | Rating |
| AllMusic | 4/5 stars |
| DIY | 2/5 stars |
| The Observer | 4/5 stars |
| PopMatters | 7/10 |
| The Telegraph | 4/5 stars |

Club Romantech received a score of 75 out of 100 on review aggregator Metacritic based on five critics' reviews, indicating "generally favorable" reception.

== Track listing ==
Club Romantech track listing
| No. | Title | Writer(s) | Producer(s) | Length |
|---|---|---|---|---|
| 1. | "Fall in Love" | Caroline Hjelt; Aino Jawo; Victoria Alkin; Emelie Eriksson; Louice Leveau; Yaroslav Polikarpov; Philip Strand | Yaro; Mark Ralph^{[a]} | 2:23 |
| 2. | "Desire" (with Joel Corry and Rain Radio) | Hjelt; Jawo; Carla Monroe; Rain Radio; Amber Van Day; Josh Wilkinson | Icona Pop; Joel Corry; Rain Radio | 2:39 |
| 3. | "Shit We Do for Love" (with Yaeger) | Hjelt; Jawo; Elizabeth Lowell Boland; Enzo Ingrosso; Hanna Jäger; Polikarpov; Strand | Yaro; Enzo Ingrosso^{[a]} | 2:47 |
| 4. | "Stick Your Tongue Out" | Hjelt; Jawo; Aluna Francis; Tim Nelson | Yaro; TimFromTheHouse^{[a]} | 2:47 |
| 5. | "Make Your Mind Up Babe" | Hjelt; Jawo; Eriksson; Polikarpov; Lise Reppe | Yaro | 2:11 |
| 6. | "Stockholm at Night" | Hjelt; Jawo; Eriksson; Polikarpov; Reppe | Yaro | 3:02 |
| 7. | "Where Do We Go from Here" | Hjelt; Jawo; Polikarpov; Robin Sherpa; Strand | Yaro | 2:48 |
| 8. | "I Want You" (with Galantis) | Hjelt; Jawo; Christian Karlsson; Lawrie Martin; Raphaella Mazaheri-Asadi; Carl Rydén | Bloodshy; Henrik Jonback; Misha K; Carl Rydén | 2:26 |
| 9. | "Loving You Ain't Easy" | Hjelt; Jawo; Eriksson; Polikarpov; Strand | Yaro | 2:34 |
| 10. | "Need You" | Hjelt; Jawo; Eriksson; Polikarpov; Strand | Yaro | 2:30 |
| 11. | "Off of My Mind" (with Vize) | Hjelt; Jawo; Mark Becker; Polikarpov; Sarah Alison Solovay; Alexander Tidebrink; Vitali Zestovskih | Yaro; Vitali Zestovskih^{[a]} | 2:44 |
| 12. | "Faster" | Hjelt; Jawo; Polikarpov | Yaro | 3:00 |
| 13. | "You're Free" (with Ultra Naté) | Hjelt; Jawo; John Ciafone; Emelie Eriksson; Polikarpov; Lem Springsteen; Strand; Ultra Naté Wyche | Yaro; Icona Pop^{[a]}; Ultra Naté^{[a]}; John "J-C" Carr^{[a]}; Bill Coleman^{[a]}; Jacob Werner^{[a]}; Danny Madden^{[a]} | 2:47 |
| 14. | "Feels in My Body" | Hjelt; Jawo; Milan D'Agostini; Nick Henriques; Joe Janiak; Solovay | Yaro; Nick Henriques^{[a]}; Anton Hård^{[b]} | 2:39 |
| 15. | "Spa" (with Sofi Tukker) | Hjelt; Jawo; Jon Hume; Tucker Halpern; Sophie Hawley-Weld | Jon Hume | 3:19 |
| Total length: | | | | 40:36 |

Club Romantech (Deluxe) track listing
| No. | Title | Writer(s) | Producer(s) | Length |
|---|---|---|---|---|
| 16. | "Tears on the Dance Floor" | Hjelt; Jawo; Andrew Jackson; Duck Blackwell | Yaro; Daniël Löfgren; Robin Sherpa | 2:41 |
| 17. | "Freak" | Hjelt; Jawo; Oskar Rindborg; Wilhelm Börjesson | Yaro; Osrin | 2:26 |
| 18. | "Stick Your Tongue Out" (Karma Fields Original Edit) | Hjelt; Jawo; Francis; Nelson | Yaro; TimFromTheHouse^{[a]} | 4:35 |
| 19. | "Shit We Do for Love" (Vize Dunk Remix) | Hjelt; Jawo; Boland; Ingrosso; Jäger; Polikarpov; Strand | Yaro; Enzo Ingrosso^{[a]} | 2:36 |
| 20. | "Fall In Love" (Icona Pop DJ Edit) | Hjelt; Jawo; Alkin; Eriksson; Leveau; Polikarpov; Strand | Icona Pop; Yaro; Mark Ralph^{[a]}; Robin Sherpa; Daniël Löfgren | 3:16 |
| 21. | "Shit We Do for Love" (original demo) | Hjelt; Jawo; Boland; Ingrosso; Jäger; Polikarpov; Strand | Yaro; Enzo Ingrosso^{[a]} | 2:59 |
| Total length: | | | | 59:21 |

Notes

- ^{^[a]} signifies a co-producer
- ^{^[b]} signifies a vocal producer

== Personnel ==
Icona Pop

- Caroline Hjelt – vocals (tracks 1–10, 12–15)
- Aino Jawo – vocals (1–10, 12–15)

Additional musicians

- Lise Reppe – background vocals (5, 6)
- Philip Strand – background vocals (7)
- Yaroslav Polikarpov – vocals (11)
- Audrey Wheeler – background vocals (13)
- Cindy Mizelle – background vocals (13)
- Keith Fluitt – background vocals (13)
- Ultra Naté – vocals (13)
- Sophie Hawley-Weld – vocals (15)
- Tucker Halpern – vocals (15)

Technical

- Cass Irvine – mastering (1–10, 12, 13)
- Samuel Wills – mastering, mixing (11)
- Aria Mastering – mastering (13)
- Colin Leonard – mastering (14)
- Kevin Grainger – mastering (15)
- Mark Ralph – mixing (1)
- Miles Walker – mixing (3–10, 12–15)
- Jacob Werner – mixing (11), engineering (1, 3, 6, 9, 13), vocal engineering (8)
- Philip Strand – engineering (4, 5), vocal engineering (7)
- Yaro – engineering (5, 6, 10, 12)
- Davie Darlington – engineering (13)
- Ultra Naté – engineering (13)
- Ryan Summer – vocal engineering (7)
- Ryan Jumper – engineering assistance (15)
