= Icona Pop (album) =

Studio album by Icona Pop
- Released: 14 November 2012
- Recorded: 2009–12
- Genre: Synth-pop
- Length: 43:02
- Label: TEN
- Producer: Patrik Berger; Elof Loelv; The Knocks; St. Lucia; Style of Eye; Tommy Tysper

Icona Pop chronology
Iconic (2012)	Icona Pop (2012)	This Is... Icona Pop (2013)

Singles from Icona Pop
- 1. "Manners" Released: 15 February 2011; 2. "I Love It" Released: 9 May 2012; 3. "We Got the World" Released: 15 October 2012

Icona Pop is the debut studio album by Swedish synth-pop duo Icona Pop, released on 14 November 2012 by TEN Music Group and includes the multi-country top 10 hit single "I Love It". The album peaked at number 55 on the Swedish Albums Chart.

== Singles ==
"Manners" was released as the lead single from the album on 15 February 2011. "I Love It" was released as the second single from the album on 9 May 2012. "We Got the World" was released as the third single from the album on 15 October 2012.

== Track listing ==
No.	Title	Writer(s)	Producer(s)	Length
1.	"Sun Goes Down" (featuring The Knocks and St. Lucia)	Caroline Hjelt; Aino Jawo; Jean-Philip Grobler; James Patterson; Benjamin Ruttner	The Knocks; St. Lucia	3:14
2.	"I Love It" (featuring Charli XCX)	Charlotte Aitchison; Patrik Berger; Linus Eklöw	Berger; Style of Eye	2:37
3.	"We Got the World"	Hjelt; Jawo; Eklöw; Jimmy Koitzsch; Elof Loelv; Nicole Morier; Tove Lo	Loelv	3:17
4.	"Downtown"	Loelv; Fredrik Berger; Hannah Robinson; Vashington	Loelv	2:37
5.	"Ready for the Weekend"	Hjelt; Jawo; Loelv; Lo	Loelv	2:41
6.	"Wanna B with Somebody"	Hjelt; Jawo; Tommy Tysper; Marcus "Mack" Sepehrmanesh	Tysper	3:01
7.	"Good for You"	Hjelt; Jawo; P. Berger; F. Berger	P. Berger	3:34
8.	"Manners"	Hjelt; Jawo; P. Berger; F. Berger	P. Berger	3:30
9.	"Top Rated"	Loelv; Vashington; F. Berger	Loelv	2:59
10.	"Lovers to Friends"	Jawo; Hjelt; Loelv	Loelv	3:01
11.	"My Party" (featuring Smiler)	Loelv; Cy Crane; Joseph Bartlett-Vanderpuye; Sepehrmanesh	Loelv	3:48
12.	"Nights Like This"	Hjelt; Jawo; Loelv	Loelv	3:27
13.	"Flashback"	Loelv; F. Berger; Robinson	Loelv	2:49
Total length:				43:02

iTunes bonus track
No.	Title	Writer(s)	Producer(s)	Length
14.	"Heads Up"	Hjelt; Jawo; Loelv	Loelv	3:00

Spotify bonus track
No.	Title	Writer(s)	Producer(s)	Length
14.	"Rocket Science"	Hjelt; Jawo; Robinson; Eklöw	Style of Eye	3:08

== Charts ==
Chart (2012)	Peak position
Swedish Albums (Sverigetopplistan)	55

== Release history ==
Region	Date	Format	Label
Sweden	14 November 2012	Digital download	TEN
