= Feels in My Body =

2020 song by Icona Pop

Single by Icona Pop

from the album Club Romantech
- Released: 7 August 2020
- Length: 2:39
- Label: TEN; Ultra
- Songwriters: Caroline Hjelt; Aino Jawo; Sarah Alison Solovay; Nick Henriques; Milan D'Agostini; Joe Janiak
- Producers: Milan D'Agostini; Nick Henriques

Icona Pop singles chronology
"Right Time" (2020)	"Feels in My Body" (2020)	"Spa" (2020)

Music video
- "Feels in My Body" on YouTube

"Feels in My Body" is a song by Swedish synth-pop duo Icona Pop. It was written by the duo along with Sarah Alison Solovay, Joe Janiak and the song's producers Nick Henriques and Milan D'Agostini. It was released on 7 August 2020, through TEN Music Group and Ultra Music.

== Music video ==
The music video for "Feels in My Body", directed by Gustav Stegfors and Crille Forsberg, was released on YouTube on 7 August 2020.

== Track listing ==
Digital download
No.	Title	Length
1.	"Feels in My Body"	2:39

Digital download
No.	Title	Length
1.	"Feels in My Body" (Extended Mix)	3:42

== Credits and personnel ==
Credits adapted from Qobuz.

- Icona Pop – composing, vocals
- Sarah Alison Solovay – composing
- Nick Henriques – composing, producing
- Milan D'Agostini – composing, producing
- Joe Janiak – composing
- Miles Walker – mixing

== Charts ==
Chart (2020)	Peak position
US Dance/Electronic Song Sales (Billboard)	22
