= Neon Future IV =

Studio album by Steve Aoki
- Released: April 3, 2020
- Recorded: 2018–2020
- Length: 90:23
- Label: Ultra; Dim Mak
- Producer: Steve Aoki (exec.); Travis Barker; Slushii; Kshmr; Omega; Felix Jaehn; Alan Walker; Showtek; Going Deeper; Makj; Alok; Bassjackers; Timmy Trumpet; Dr. Phunk; Ummet Ozcan; Dzeko; Sly; Dehiro; Big Fred; James Njde

Steve Aoki chronology
Neon Future III (2018)	Neon Future IV (2020)	Hiroquest: Genesis (2022)

Singles from Neon Future IV
- 1. "Are You Lonely" Released: February 22, 2019; 2. "Play It Cool" Released: March 22, 2019; 3. "Do It Again" Released: April 19, 2019; 4. "Rave" Released: June 28, 2019; 5. "Crash Into Me" Released: July 12, 2019; 6. "Hava" Released: August 9, 2019; 7. "Let It Be Me" Released: September 6, 2019; 8. "I Wanna Rave" Released: October 25, 2019; 9. "2 in a Million" Released: December 6, 2019; 10. "Popcorn" Released: December 20, 2019; 11. "Maldad" Released: January 17, 2020; 12. "Halfway Dead" Released: March 6, 2020; 13. "Love You More" Released: March 20, 2020; 14. "One True Love" Released: March 27, 2020; 15. "I Love My Friends" Released: April 3, 2020

Neon Future IV is the sixth studio album by American DJ and producer Steve Aoki, succeeding his 2018 album Neon Future III. It was released on April 3, 2020, through Dim Mak Records. It contains collaborations with Lights, Norwegian producer Alan Walker, Brazilian DJ Alok, Indonesian singer Agnez Mo, Australian musician Timmy Trumpet, German DJ Felix Jaehn, American DJ Slushii, Travis Barker and Makj, Dutch DJs Ummet Ozcan, Dzeko and Dr. Phunk, and Dutch bands Showtek, Bassjackers and Going Deeper.

== Background ==
Steve Aoki first announced the album during an interview for EDM.com at the end of January 2019. According to him, it marks the continuation of Neon Future II and III that he wrote together. He announced that he was finishing Neon Future IV, which would contain "mega collaborations" and that he would release the following singles of the album one by one, before publishing the opus, which was originally planned to be unveiled in 2019. A few days after, he announced via Twitter that he was working for a song with American rapper Ty Dolla Sign, which will be included in Neon Future IV. The album availability date has been announced several months after the release of Neon Future III in November 2018, and two dates were defined, first in Spring 2019, then in September 2019. In June, during an interview for MusicTech, he confirmed that he was working on it and prevented that many new singles will be dropped in order to complement the upcoming album. During an interview for iHeartRadio about his song "Let It Be Me" released in September, Aoki said, "Neon Future IV is packed with collabs. Every song is gonna be [a] very interesting, diverse collab list of artists from all different kinds of worlds — which is how I love to do Neon Future. It's all about connecting with artists from all different walks of life." In November, he premiered his album during All Nippon Airways Celebration in New York. A few moments before his performance, he said, "It's a bit nerve wracking because I've never played it for anyone. Actually, some of these songs never heard the light of day outside my studio. So this is a big moment, and the moment's coming soon. The Neon Future IV album will be coming out soon, but people in this room tonight will be the first to ever hear what I've been working on for a long time." The DJ also confirmed that it will be released at the end of 2019, and then debuted a mix containing his previous tracks and seven unreleased songs – all of them are collaborations – which should appear in the album tracklist. Liz Kraker of EDM.com noted that they varied in subgenre with dance-pop, future bass, trap and moombahton. After the release of the track "2 in a Million" in December 2019, the album was announced for release in 2020.

== Track listing ==
Side 1
No.	Title	Writer(s)	Producer(s)	Length
1.	"Closer to God" (featuring Julien Marchal and Kita Sovee)	Steve Aoki; Julien Marchal	Steve Aoki	4:38
2.	"I Love My Friends" (featuring Icona Pop)	Aoki; Nathaniel Campany; Sara Hjellstrom; Nirob Islam; Jacob Manson; Bruce Fielder; Daniel Stein; Aino Jawo; Caroline Hjelt	Aoki; DJ Fresh (USA)	3:05
3.	"Halfway Dead" (featuring Global Dan and Travis Barker)	Aoki; Global Dan; Travis Barker	Aoki; Barker	3:24
4.	"Daylight" (featuring Tory Lanez)	Aoki; Jason Boyd; Nolan Lambroza; Daystar Petersen	Aoki; Poo Bear; Sir Nolan	3:15
5.	"One True Love" (with Slushii)	Aoki; Julian Scanlan	Aoki; Slushii	3:24
6.	"Girl" (featuring Agnez Mo and Desiigner)	Aoki; Jahan Yousaf; Yasmine Yousaf; Daniel Henig; Sidney Selby III	Aoki	3:12
7.	"Maldad" (featuring Maluma)	Aoki; Niles Hollowell-Dhar; Giancarlos Rivera Tapia; Jonathan River Tapia; Juan Luis Londoño Arias	Aoki; KSHMR	2:48
8.	"Last One to Know" (featuring Mike Shinoda and Lights)	Aoki; Michael Kenji Shinoda	Aoki	3:17
9.	"Love You More" (featuring Lay and will.i.am)	Aoki; William Adams; Zhang Yixing	Aoki	3:24
10.	"2 in a Million" (featuring Sting and Shaed)	Aoki; Chelsea Lee; Benjamin Ingrosso; Fernando Garibay; Gordon Sumner; Jake Torrey; Maxwell Ernst; Spencer Ernst; Ramiro Padilla; Michael "Omega" Fonseca	Aoki; Omega	3:55
11.	"Let It Be Me" (featuring Backstreet Boys)	Aoki; Alexandru Craciun; Michael Gazzo; Henig; Torrey; Noah Conrad; Teddy Geiger	Aoki; Geiger; Torrey^{[c]}; Conrad^{[c]}; Stuart Crichton^{[v]}	3:44
12.	"1 4 U" (featuring Zooey Deschanel)	Aoki; Daniel Silberstein; Alexandra Yatchenko; Gazzo; Jordan Johnson; Marcus Lomax	Aoki	3:23
13.	"Inside Out" (with Felix Jaehn featuring Jamie Scott)	Aoki; Felix Jaehn; Markus Sephermanesh; Thomas Troelsen	Aoki; Jaehn	2:37
14.	"Play It Cool" (featuring Monsta X)	Aoki; Corey Sanders; Sylvester "Sly" Siversten; Clarence Coffee Jr.; David Morup	Aoki; Sly; Dehiro	2:49
15.	"Crash Into Me" (featuring Darren Criss)	Colden Grey; David John Matthews	Aoki	3:46
Total length:				49:41

Side 2
No.	Title	Writer(s)	Producer(s)	Length
16.	"New Blood" (featuring Sydney Sierota)	Aoki; Michelle Buzz; Gazzo; Justin Gamella; Sydney Seirota	Aoki	3:12
17.	"Homo Deus" (featuring Yuval Harari)	Aoki; Yuval Noah Harari	Aoki	3:36
18.	"Are You Lonely" (with Alan Walker featuring Isák)	Aoki; Alan Walker; Anders Frøen; Ella Marie Hætta Isaksen; Fredrik Borch Olsen; James Eriksen; Jesper Borgen; Karra Madden; Reid Stefanick; Øyvind Sauvik	Aoki; Walker; Big Fred^{[vp]}; James Njie	2:37
19.	"Do It Again" (with Alok)	Aoki; Alexander Williams; Edmund Simons; Thomas Rowlands	Aoki; Alok; Jay Pryor; Wolve	2:56
20.	"Terra Incognita" (featuring Bryan Johnson)	Aoki; Bryan Johnson	Aoki	3:22
21.	"2045" (with Going Deeper)	Aoki; Evgeny Voronov; Timur Shafiev	Aoki; Going Deeper	3:58
22.	"Popcorn" (with Ummet Ozcan and Dzeko)	Gershon Kingsley	Aoki; Ummet Ozcan; Dzeko	3:33
23.	"I Wanna Rave" (with Bassjackers)	Aoki; Marlon Flohr; Ralph van Hilst; Renze Michels; Siem Henskens	Aoki; Bassjackers	2:24
24.	"Hava" (with Timmy Trumpet featuring Dr Phunk)	Aoki; Jordy Buijs; Timothy Jude Smith	Aoki; Timmy Trumpet; Dr Phunk	4:19
25.	"Rave" (with Showtek and Makj featuring Kris Kiss)	Aoki; Kristian Kiss; Mackenzie Johnson; Sjoerd Janssen; Wouter Janssen	Aoki; Showtek; Makj	3:25
26.	"Cut You Loose" (featuring Matthew Koma)	Aoki; Gazzo; Matthew Bair	Aoki	4:19
27.	"Eevos Atik foes ireht" (featuring Kita Sovee)	Aoki	Aoki	3:01
Total length:				40:52

Japanese edition bonus tracks
No.	Title	Writer(s)	Producer(s)	Length
28.	"Let It Be Me" (Denis First Remix) (featuring Backstreet Boys)	Aoki; Alexandru Craciun; Michael Gazzo; Henig; Torrey; Noah Conrad; Teddy Geiger	Aoki; Geiger; Torrey^{[c]}; Conrad^{[c]}; Stuart Crichton^{[v]}; Denis First^{[r]}	3:22
29.	"Maldad" (R3hab Remix) (featuring Maluma)	Aoki; Niles Hollowell-Dhar; Giancarlos Rivera Tapia; Jonathan River Tapia; Juan Luis Londoño Arias	Aoki; KSHMR; R3HAB^{[r]}	2:13
30.	"Crash Into Me" (Settle Down Steavis Aoki Remix) (featuring Darren Criss))	Colden Grey; David John Matthews	Aoki^{[rp]}	4:26
Total length:				50:53

Notes

- ^{^[c]} signifies a co-producer
- ^{^[v]} signifies a vocal producer
- ^{^[vp]} signifies a producer and vocal producer
- ^{^[r]} signifies a remix producer
- ^{^[rp]} signifies a producer and remix producer

== Charts ==
Chart (2020)	Peak position
Japanese Albums (Oricon)	125
US Top Dance Albums (Billboard)	11
