= Emergency (Icona Pop song) =

Single by Icona Pop

from the EP Emergency
- B-side: "First Time"; "Clap Snap"
- Released: 26 May 2015
- Recorded: 2015
- Genre: Electro swing
- Length: 2:49
- Label: TEN; Big Beat; Atlantic
- Songwriters: Aino Jawo; Caroline Hjelt; Erik Hassle; Teddy Geiger; Eric Frederic; Tom Peyton; Antonio Puntillo; Luca Citandini; Gianfranco Bortolotti; Diego Leoni
- Producer: Ricky Reed

Icona Pop singles chronology
"Never Been in Love" (2014)	"Emergency" (2015)	"Ride" (2015)

EP cover

"Emergency" is a song by Swedish synth-pop duo Icona Pop, taken from the EP of the same name. It was released on 26 May 2015 by TEN Music Group and Atlantic. "Emergency" features uncredited vocals from Swedish singer Erik Hassle. The music video directed by B. Åkerlund, Jonas Åkerlund's wife, in collaboration with design duo KTZ was premiered on 17 June.

== Track listing ==
Digital download
No.	Title	Length
1.	"Emergency"	2:49

Digital download (EP)
No.	Title	Writer(s)	Producer(s)	Length
1.	"Emergency"	Aino Jawo; Caroline Hjelt; Eric Frederic; Erik Hassle; John Theodore Geiger II; Tom Peyton; Antonio Puntillo; Luca Citandini; Gianfranco Bortolotti; Diego Leoni	Ricky Reed	2:49
2.	"First Time"	Jawo; Hjelt; Frederic; Geiger II; Jacob Kasher Hindlin; Gamal Lewis; Bjorn Olovsson	Ricky Reed	3:11
3.	"Clap Snap"	Jawo; Hjelt; Frederic; Geiger II; Lincoln Chase	Ricky Reed	2:44

Digital download (Remixes)
No.	Title	Length
1.	"Emergency" (Sam Feldt Remix)	4:16
2.	"Emergency" (Ghassemi Remix)	4:30
3.	"Emergency" (Tommie Sunshine and Kandy Remix)	3:34
4.	"Emergency" (Party Thieves Remix)	3:39
5.	"Emergency" (Digital Farm Animals Remix)	5:04
6.	"Emergency" (Club Killers Remix)	3:56

== Credits and personnel ==
- Lead vocals – Icona Pop
- Vocals – Erik Hassle
- Additional vocals – Teddy Geiger
- Lyrics – Aino Jawo, Antonio Puntillo, Caroline Hjelt, Diego Leoni, Eric Frederic, Erik Hassle, Gianfranco Bortolotti, Luca Citandini, Teddy Geiger, Tom Peyton
- Producer, programmer, piano – Ricky Reed
- Recorded by – Elysian Park
- Engineer – Ethan Shumaker
- Mixer – Manny Marroquin
- Assistant mix engineer – Chris Galland, Ike Schultz
- Masterer – Chris Gehringer
- Label: TEN Music Group – Big Beat – Atlantic Records

== Charts ==
=== Weekly charts ===
Weekly chart performance for "Emergency"
Chart (2015)	Peak position
Canada Hot 100 (Billboard)	99
Hungary (Editors' Choice Top 40)	11
Sweden (Sverigetopplistan)	19
US Dance Club Songs (Billboard)	1

=== Year-end charts ===
Year-end chart performance for "Emergency"
Chart (2015)	Position
Sweden (Sverigetopplistan)	86
US Dance Club Songs (Billboard)	22

== Certifications ==
Certifications for "Emergency"
Region	Certification	Certified units/sales
Sweden (GLF)	2× Platinum	80,000^{‡}
^{‡} Sales+streaming figures based on certification alone.

== See also ==
- List of number-one dance singles of 2015 (U.S.)
