= In the Stars (Icona Pop song) =

Promotional single by Icona Pop

from the album This Is... Icona Pop
- Released: 3 September 2013
- Genre: Synth-pop
- Length: 3:16 (Album version); 3:31 (Galaxy Mix)
- Label: TEN; Big Beat; Atlantic
- Songwriter(s): Jarrad Rogers; Fransisca Hall; Anjulie Persaud
- Producer(s): Rogers; Aino Jawo; Caroline Hjelt

Icona Pop promotional singles chronology
"Ready for the Weekend" (2012)	"In the Stars" (2013)	"My Party" (2014)

"In the Stars" is a song by Swedish synth-pop duo Icona Pop from their second studio album This Is... Icona Pop (2013). The song was written by the duo, Jarrad Rogers, Fransisca Hall, and Anjulie Persaud. The remix of the song, titled "In the Stars (Galaxy Mix)", was released for digital download and streaming on 3 September 2013 through TEN, Big Beat, and Atlantic as the promotional single.

== Personnel ==
Credits adapted from Tidal and Genius.

- Icona Pop – vocals, songwriting, co-producing
- Jarrad Rogers – songwriting, producing, programming, instruments
- Fransisca Hall – producing, backing vocals
- Anjulie Persaud – producing
- Chris Gehringer – mastering
- John Hanes – engineering
- Serban Ghenea – mixing
- Matt Beckley – vocal producing, recording engineering

== Charts ==
Chart performance for "In the Stars"
Chart (2013)	Peak position
US Hot Dance/Electronic Songs (Billboard)	22

== Release history ==
Release dates and formats for "Future Nostalgia"
Region	Date	Format(s)	Label(s)	Ref.
Various	3 September 2013	Digital download; streaming	TEN; Big Beat; Atlantic	
