= Someone Who Can Dance =

Single by Icona Pop
- Released: 25 February 2016
- Length: 2:52
- Label: TEN; Atlantic; Warner
- Songwriter(s): Elliphant; Caroline Hjelt; Aino Jawo; Jarrad Rogers
- Producer(s): Jarrad Rogers

Icona Pop singles chronology
"Ride" (2015)	"Someone Who Can Dance" (2016)	"Weekend" (2016)

"Someone Who Can Dance" is a song by Swedish synth-pop duo Icona Pop. It was written by Elliphant, Jarrad Rogers and Icona Pop, while being produced by Rogers. It was released on 25 February 2016, through TEN Music Group, Atlantic Records and Warner Music Group.

== Live performances ==
On 24 February 2016, Icona Pop performed "Someone Who Can Dance" at the Grammis Gala along with Zara Larsson and Elliphant.

== Track listing ==
Digital download
No.	Title	Writer(s)	Length
1.	"Someone Who Can Dance"	Elliphant; Caroline Hjelt; Aino Jawo; Jarrad Rogers	2:52

Remixes
No.	Title	Length
1.	"Someone Who Can Dance" (Club Mix)	5:59
2.	"Someone Who Can Dance" (I M Alec Remix)	4:19

== Credits and personnel ==
Credits adapted from Genius.

- Icona Pop – composing, vocals
- Jarrad Rogers - composing, producing, mixing
- Elliphant - composing

== Charts ==
Chart (2016)	Peak position
US Hot Dance/Electronic Songs (Billboard)	21
Sweden (Sverigetopplistan)	56
