= All Night (Icona Pop song) =

2013 song by Icona Pop

Single by Icona Pop

from the album This Is... Icona Pop
- Released: 23 July 2013
- Recorded: 2013
- Genre: Synth-pop; house
- Length: 3:06
- Label: TEN; Big Beat
- Songwriters: Aino Jawo; Brian Lee; Caroline Hjelt; Elof Loelv; Jonathan Sloan; Luke Steele; Nick Littlemore
- Producers: Brian Lee; Elof Loelv

Icona Pop singles chronology
"Girlfriend" (2013)	"All Night" (2013)	"Just Another Night" (2014)

Music video
- "All Night" on YouTube

"All Night" is a song by Swedish synth-pop duo Icona Pop, from their second studio and international debut album, This Is... Icona Pop (2013). The album was released worldwide on 23 July 2013, as a digital download by Swedish independent record label TEN Music Group, as well as Atlantic Records subsidiary Big Beat Records. The song is the second single to be released from the album, following "Girlfriend". It was featured in the film Neighbors and appears on the film's soundtrack.

== Composition ==
According to the sheet music published at Musicnotes.com, "All Night" is written in the key of E major with a tempo of 120 beats per minute. It follows a chord progression of A–E–C♯m–B.

== Music video ==
The video for "All Night" was directed by Marc Klasfeld and follows the hidden lifestyle of nightlife performers in the ball culture, particularly, but not limited to, drag queens. The music video is set in New York City and sheds light on the back story of some of the performers, as they reveal their hidden identities and why they chose to become a part of the underground business. As the show gets under way, the host reveals that two groups will be participating in the night's fashion show (known in the video as "The Ball"), House of Sparkle and House of Spirit. As Icona Pop performs, the "Paris Is Burning"-esque "vogue-off" gets under way. Performers arrive onto the platform and are then judged by a panel based on their stride down the catwalk. As costumes become more extravagant and groups try to out do each other, Icona Pop claims that "they can do it all night". Towards the end of the video, performers are exposed as both, their real self and the identity they portray every night. The performers provide an in depth short cut interview into some of the reasons they take part in "house ballroom" culture. Some of the performers include; Chi Chi, Pony, Jeremy, Marie, Derrick, Javier, Gisele, Mother Leiomy, Princess Lockerooo and Father Jose. At the end of the music video, a performer is left with the final word of the night by saying; "For whatever it is that you're bringing, your outfit, your body, your face, your skills. These people put so much effort and so much energy and so much love into everything that they do. It's a role of creativity and I'll take it. I'll take all of it".

== Track listing ==
Digital download
No.	Title	Length
1.	"All Night"	3:06

Remixes
No.	Title	Length
1.	"All Night" (Cash Cash Radio Edit)	3:26
2.	"All Night" (Crazibiza Radio Edit)	3:09
3.	"All Night" (Dilemmachine and Tony Tone Radio Edit)	3:47
4.	"All Night" (K.Flay Remix)	3:30
5.	"All Night" (Wayne G and LFB Remix)	7:07
6.	"All Night" (Captain Cuts Remix)	4:06

== Charts and certifications ==
=== Weekly charts ===
Weekly chart performance for "All Night"
Chart (2013)	Peak position
Australia (ARIA)	65
Austria (Ö3 Austria Top 40)	43
Belgium (Ultratip Bubbling Under Flanders)	11
Belgium Dance (Ultratop Flanders)	17
Belgium Dance Bubbling Under (Ultratop Flanders)	1
Belgium (Ultratip Bubbling Under Wallonia)	10
Belgium Dance (Ultratop Wallonia)	10
Belgium Dance Bubbling Under (Ultratop Wallonia)	3
Canada Hot 100 (Billboard)	57
Germany (GfK)	66
Hungary (Dance Top 40)	11
Hungary (Rádiós Top 40)	4
Ireland (IRMA)	20
Poland Dance (ZPAV)	26
Scottish Singles Sales (Official Charts)	18
Spain (Promusicae)	43
Switzerland (Schweizer Hitparade)	75
UK Singles (Official Charts)	31
US Bubbling Under Hot 100 (Billboard)	11
US Pop Airplay (Billboard)	33
US Dance Club Songs (Billboard)	1
US Hot Dance/Electronic Songs (Billboard)	11

=== Year-end charts ===
Year-end chart performance for "All Night"
Chart (2013)	Position
Hungary (Dance Top 40)	90
US Hot Dance/Electronic Songs (Billboard)	34
Chart (2014)	Position
Hungary (Dance Top 40)	41
Hungary (Rádiós Top 40)	80
US Hot Dance/Electronic Songs (Billboard)	60

=== Certifications ===
Certifications for "All Night"
Region	Certification	Certified units/sales
Canada (Music Canada)	Gold	40,000^{*}
United States (RIAA)	Gold	500,000^{‡}
^{*} Sales figures based on certification alone.^{‡} Sales+streaming figures based on certification alone.

== Release history ==
Release history and formats for "All Night"
Region	Date	Format	Label
United States	23 July 2013	Digital download	TEN; Atlantic Records
Canada	23 July 2013	Digital download	TEN; Atlantic Records
United Kingdom	20 October 2013	Digital download	TEN; Atlantic Records

== Ive version ==
"All Night"

Single by Ive featuring Saweetie
- Released: 18 January 2024
- Genre: Dance-pop
- Length: 3:17
- Label: Starship; Columbia
- Lyricists: Brian Lee; Elof Loelv; Aino Jawo; Caroline Hjelt; Jonathan Sloan; Luke Steele; Nick Littlemore
- Producers: Brian Lee; Elof Loelv

Ive singles chronology
"Baddie" (2023)	"All Night" (2024)	"Heya" (2024)

Saweetie singles chronology
"Do It for the Bay" (2024)	"All Night" (2024)	"Richtivities" (2024)

Music video
- "All Night" on YouTube

The song was later recorded by South Korean girl group Ive as their debut English single, and features an extra verse from American rapper Saweetie. A snippet of the song was first teased on 9 January 2024 via the group's Instagram.

=== Music video ===
The music video premiered on 18 January 2024. It was directed by Charlotte Rutherford & Crystalline, with production from Left. It was shot at 222 W 6th St in San Pedro, Los Angeles, California.

The video begins with text messages superimposed over the video from Saweetie, asking Ive to assist with her business. After entering the office building, Ive uses the elevator to reach Saweetie's office. Later, the group opens up a video meeting invite from Saweetie, causing emojis to fly out of the screen, and a montage of partying and dancing begins. Saweetie's verse is set in a meeting room before meeting up with Ive in the office hallways. The group continues to dance and party in the office until the song's end. The video ends with footage of the office afterwards, trashed by the party, overlaid by a voicemail message from Saweetie saying she and Ive are "out of office".

=== Credits ===
Credits adapted from Apple Music.

- Ive – vocals
- Saweetie – rap
- Sophia Pae – background vocals
- Anthony Vichils, Trey Station, Zach Pereyra – assistant engineers
- Chris Gehringer – mastering engineer
- Cirkut, Yung Eun Yang – engineer
- Jung Eunkyung, Yeo Minsoo – editing engineer
- Manny Marroquin – mixing engineer
- Sam Carter – vocal recording engineer

=== Charts ===
==== Weekly charts ====
Weekly chart performance for "All Night" by Ive
Chart (2024)	Peak position
New Zealand Hot Singles (RMNZ)	32
South Korea (Circle)	104
US World Digital Song Sales (Billboard)	10

==== Monthly charts ====
Monthly chart performance for "All Night"
Chart (2024)	Position
South Korea (Circle)	123

== See also ==
- List of number-one dance singles of 2013 (U.S.)
