= Girls Girls (song) =

Single by Icona Pop
- Released: 16 June 2017
- Recorded: 2017
- Genre: Pop; tropical house
- Length: 2:49
- Label: TEN; Atlantic; Warner
- Songwriter(s): Johan Gustafson; Litens Anton Nilsson; Caroline Hjelt; Aino Jawo; Marcus Andersson; Tove Lo; Emma Bertilsson
- Producer(s): Johan Gustafson

Icona Pop singles chronology
"Windows" (2017)	"Girls Girls" (2017)	"Let You Down" (2017)

Music video
- "Girls Girls" on YouTube

"Girls Girls" (stylized as "GIRLS GIRLS") is a song by Swedish synth-pop duo Icona Pop. It was written by Litens Anton Nilsson, Icona Pop, Marcus Andersson, Tove Lo, Emma Bertilsson and Johan Gustafson, with the latter one handling the song's production. It was released commercially for digital download on 16 June 2017, through TEN Music Group, Atlantic Records and Warner Music Group, as the duo's first single of 2017.

== Music video ==
The official music video was released on Icona Pop's YouTube channel on 16 June 2017. It included selfies from the duo themselves, as well as selfies collected from their fans.

== Critical reception ==
Rob Copsey of Official Charts Company wrote that the song "sounds like summer", "sees Icona Pop sticking to what they know best, i.e, great, big, stomping neon pop, albeit with a deep/tropical house edge to it this time out" and "ends in such an abrupt way that you'll want to put it straight back on." Similarly, Raisa Bruner of Time magazine also noted it "sounds like summer" and regarded the song as "a club-ready groove mixing their signature singalong choruses with a tropical house edge". Mike Wass of Idolator said that the song is "a soaring tune" and "a club-ready, pop-centric party anthem that really should be blasting out of every radio over the summer". Lilian Min of HelloGiggles said the song has "an excellent bubbly beat and a refreshing femme-centric vibe".

== Credits and personnel ==
Credits adapted from Tidal.

- Icona Pop – composing, vocals
- Johan Gustafson – composing, producing, mixing
- Litens Anton Nilsson – composing
- Marcus Andersson – composing
- Tove Lo – composing
- Emma Bertilsson – composing
- Chris Gehringer – mastering engineering
- Nicki Adamsson – engineering

== Charts ==
Chart performance for "Girls Girls"
Chart (2017)	Peak position
Sweden (Sverigetopplistan)	53

== Certifications ==
Certifications for "Girls Girls"
Region	Certification	Certified units/sales
Streaming
Sweden (GLF)	Gold	4,000,000^{†}
^{†} Streaming-only figures based on certification alone.
