= Let's Go (Tiësto song) =

Single by Tiësto featuring Icona Pop

from the album A Town Called Paradise
- Released: 13 May 2014
- Genre: Progressive house; dance-pop
- Length: 3:22
- Label: Musical Freedom; PM:AM; Casablanca; Republic; Universal
- Songwriter(s): Tijs Verwest; Aino Jawo; Caroline Hjelt; Oscar Holter; Marcus Sepehrmanesh; Alx Reuterskiöld; Karl-Ola Solem Kjellholm
- Producer(s): Tiësto; Oscar Holter

Tiësto singles chronology
"Wasted" (2014)	"Let's Go" (2014)	"Say Something" (2014)

Icona Pop singles chronology
"Just Another Night" (2014)	"Let's Go" (2014)	"Get Lost" (2014)

Alternative cover

"Let's Go" is a song by Dutch disc jockey and producer Tiësto with vocals from Swedish synth-pop duo Icona Pop, who co-wrote the song with Tiësto, Oscar Holter, Marcus Sepehrmanesh, Alx Reuterskiöld and Karl-Ola Solem Kjellholm. It was released on 13 May 2014 by PM:AM Recordings as the third single from Tiësto's fifth studio album, A Town Called Paradise.

"Let's Go" was featured in the soundtracks of numerous films or TV shows, such as Night at the Museum: Secret of the Tomb, Pitch Perfect 2, Vacation, Sisters, Red Band Society, Hawaii Five-0 or the teaser trailer for the 2018 animated film Teen Titans Go! To the Movies.

== Background and release ==
Tiësto declared about the song : "It's a very energetic track with so much energy in it. When I hear that track [...], the only thing I want is to go out !"

== Reception ==
Nolan Freeney of Time considers that "Tiësto’s production doesn’t grind quite as hard as the singers’ past hits, and the added acoustic guitars feel like a blatant effort to capitalize on the success of Avicii’s “Wake Me Up!” but all of that is forgivable: the track’s highs are euphoric enough to get the job done."

== Track listing ==
Digital Download

1. "Let's Go" - 3:22

== Charts ==
Chart (2014)	Peak position
US Hot Dance/Electronic Songs (Billboard)	30
