= This Is... Icona Pop =

Studio album by Icona Pop
- Released: 23 September 2013
- Recorded: 2011–2013
- Genres: Synth-pop; new wave; electro house; dance-pop
- Length: 32:58
- Labels: TEN; Big Beat; Atlantic
- Producers: Stargate; Elof Loelv; Patrik Berger; Style of Eye; Brian Lee; Jarrad Rogers; Shellback; Kool Kojak; Benny Blanco; Justin Parker; 10k Islands

Icona Pop chronology
Icona Pop (2012)	This Is... Icona Pop (2013)	Emergency EP (2015)

Singles from This Is...
- 1. "I Love It" Released: 9 May 2012; 2. "We Got the World" Released: 15 October 2012; 3. "Girlfriend" Released: 4 June 2013; 4. "All Night" Released: 23 July 2013; 5. "Just Another Night" Released: 27 January 2014

This Is... Icona Pop (also known as simply This Is...) is the second studio album and debut international album by Swedish synth-pop duo Icona Pop, released on 23 September 2013 by Swedish independent record label TEN Music Group and Atlantic Records subsidiary Big Beat Records in the US. "Girlfriend" was released on 4 June 2013 as the first single, followed by "All Night" on 23 July 2013. The album also includes the hit single "I Love It" which was also included on the band's Swedish-only self-titled debut album Icona Pop. On 16 September 2013, the album was made available to stream in full on the Pitchfork website. The album debuted at number 36 on the Billboard 200.

== Reception ==
Professional ratings
Aggregate scores
Source	Rating
Metacritic	69/100
Review scores
Source	Rating
The A.V. Club	A−"
AllMusic	4/5 stars
Consequence of Sound	3/5 stars
Pitchfork	7.5/10
Rolling Stone	3.5/5 stars

This Is... received positive reviews from critics upon its release. The album scored a 69 out of 100 on review aggregator Metacritic based upon 22 reviews, indicating "generally favorable reviews". Under the Radar wrote that This Is... "[is a] nurturing, exciting, and very intelligent debut." The A.V. Club described This Is... as "a refreshingly fun album with no pretenses, just plenty of sing-along hooks and dancefloor jams."

== Track listing ==
This Is... Icona Pop track listing
No.	Title	Writer(s)	Producer(s)	Length
1.	"I Love It" (featuring Charli XCX)	Patrik Berger; Charlotte Aitchison; Linus Eklöw	Berger; Style of Eye	2:37
2.	"All Night"	Elof Loelv; Brian Lee; Aino Jawo; Caroline Hjelt; Nick Littlemore; Luke Steele; Jonathan Sloan	Loelv; Lee	3:06
3.	"We Got the World"	Loelv; Jawo; Hjelt; Tove Lo; Eklöw; Nicole Morier	Loelv	3:07
4.	"Ready for the Weekend"	Loelv; Lo; Jawo; Hjelt	Loelv	2:42
5.	"Girlfriend"	Mack; Jawo; Hjelt; James Reynolds; Mark Knight; Caweh Passereh; Mikkel S. Eriksen; Tor Erik Hermansen; Marvin Harper; Ricy Rouse; Tupac Shakur; Tyrone Wrice	Stargate; Knight^{[a]}; Reynolds^{[a]}; Passereh^{[a]}	2:50
6.	"In the Stars"	Jarrad "Jaz" Rogers; Fransisca Hall; Anjulie Persaud	Rogers	3:16
7.	"On a Roll"	Peter Svensson; Kool Kojak; Shellback	Shellback; Svensson^{[a]}; Kool Kojak^{[a]}	3:12
8.	"Just Another Night"	Hermansen; Eriksen; Benjamin Levin; Dan Omelio; Ross Golan; Justin Parker	Stargate; Benny Blanco	3:09
9.	"Hold On"	Eriksen; Hermansen; Benjamin Eli Hanna	Stargate	3:17
10.	"Light Me Up"	Nick Scapa; Hall; Jawo; Hjelt; Loelv; Lo	10k Islands; Johan Wedel	3:20
11.	"Then We Kiss"	Markus Krunegård; Jarvis Anderson; Berger; Jawo; Hjelt; Loelv	Berger; Markus Krunegård^{[a]}	2:22
Total length:				32:58

German digital bonus tracks
No.	Title	Writer(s)	Producer(s)	Length
12.	"I Love It" (Club Edit; featuring Charli XCX)	Berger; Aitchison; Eklöw	Berger; Style of Eye	5:06
13.	"All Night" (Cash Cash Remix Radio Edit)	Loelv; Lee; Jawo; Hjelt; Littlemore; Steele; Sloan	Loelv; Lee	3:26
Total length:				41:32

Target edition bonus tracks
No.	Title	Writer(s)	Producer(s)	Length
12.	"Nights Like This"	Loelv; Jawo; Hjelt	Loelv	3:25
13.	"Heads Up"	Loelv; Jawo; Hjelt	Loelv; Wedel	2:59
14.	"Lovers to Friends"	Loelv; Jawo; Hjelt	Loelv	2:58
15.	"I Love It" (Fix8 Mix)	Berger; Aitchison; Eklöw	Berger; Style of Eye; Fix8^{[c]}	5:04
Total length:				47:24

Japanese bonus tracks
No.	Title	Writer(s)	Producer(s)	Length
16.	"I Love It" (Tiësto Club Life Remix; featuring Charli XCX)	Berger; Aitchison; Eklöw	Berger; Style of Eye; Tiësto^{[c]}	4:30
Total length:				51:54

Notes

- ^{^[a]} signifies a co-producer.
- ^{^[b]} signifies an additional producer.
- ^{^[c]} signifies a remixer.

== Personnel ==
Credits for This Is... Icona Pop adapted from AllMusic.

- Adis Adamsson – executive producer
- Nicki Adamsson – vocal engineer
- Matt Beckley – vocal engineer, vocal producer
- Patrik Berger – mixing, musician, producer, programming, vocal engineer, vocal producer
- Amanda Bergman – background vocals
- Tim Blacksmith – executive producer
- Benny Blanco – musician, producer, programming
- Charli XCX – featured artist, background vocals
- Robert Cohen – engineer
- Tom Coyne – mastering
- Danny D. – executive producer
- Raia Michaela – guitar
- Mikkel Storleer Eriksen – engineer, musician, programming
- Emma Essinger – background vocals
- Fredrik Etoall – photography
- Read Fasse – keyboards, programming
- Chris Gehringer – mastering
- Serban Ghenea – mixing
- Ross Golan – vocals
- Gene Grimaldi – mastering
- Andrew Haas – guitar
- Ola Håkansson – executive producer
- Fransisca Hall – background vocals
- John Hanes – mixing engineer
- Patrick Hart – keyboards
- Tor Erik Hermansen – musician, programming
- Caroline Hjelt – executive producer
- Icona Pop – primary artist
- Aino Jawo – executive producer
- Mark Knight – producer
- Kool Kojak – additional production, keyboards
- Markus Krunegård – musician, producer, programming
- Brian Lee – musician, producer, programming
- Colin Leonard – mastering
- Rafi Levy – guitar
- Tove Lo – background vocals
- Elof Loelv – mixing, musician, producer, programming, vocal engineer, vocal producer, background vocals
- Andrew Luftman – production coordination
- Blake Mares – engineer
- Robert Orton – mixing
- Caweh Passereh – producer
- Noah Passovoy – engineer
- James Reynolds – producer
- Daniela Rivera – assistant engineer, engineer
- Brian Robertson – bass
- Jarrad "Jaz" Rogers – musician, producer, programming
- Chris Rude – keyboards
- Nick Scapa – keyboards, programming, background vocals
- Chris Sclafani – assistant
- Shellback – keyboards, producer, programming, background vocals
- Stargate – musician, producer, programming
- Style of Eye – musician, producer, programming
- Peter Svensson – additional production, guitar
- Phil Tan – mixing
- Carolyn Tracey – package production
- Virgilio Tzaj – art direction, design
- Miles Walker – engineer
- Johan Wedel – keyboards, producer, programming
- Scott "Yarnov" Yarnovsky – production coordination

== Charts ==
Chart performance for This Is... Icona Pop
Chart (2013)	Peak position
Australian Albums (ARIA)	62
Belgian Albums (Ultratop Flanders)	96
Belgian Albums (Ultratop Wallonia)	120
French Albums (SNEP)	185
German Albums (Offizielle Top 100)	99
Irish Albums (IRMA)	65
Italian Albums (FIMI)	77
Spanish Albums (Promusicae)	78
Swiss Albums (Schweizer Hitparade)	46
UK Albums (Official Charts)	86
US Billboard 200	36
US Top Dance Albums (Billboard)	3

== Certifications ==
Certifications for This Is... Icona Pop
Region	Certification	Certified units/sales
United States (RIAA)	Gold	500,000^{‡}
^{‡} Sales+streaming figures based on certification alone.

== Release history ==
Release history and formats for This Is... Icona Pop
Region	Date	Format	Label
France	23 September 2013	CD; digital download	TEN; Atlantic
United States	24 September 2013	CD; digital download	Big Beat
Japan	25 September 2013	CD; digital download	Warner Music Japan
United Kingdom	4 November 2013	CD; digital download	TEN; Atlantic
Germany	8 November 2013	CD; digital download	TEN; Atlantic
