= Brightside (Icona Pop song) =

Single by Icona Pop
- Released: 21 October 2016
- Recorded: 2016
- Length: 2:51
- Label: TEN; Atlantic; Warner
- Songwriter(s): Frederic Kennett; Joni Fatora; Caroline Hjelt; Maxim; Mr. Rogers; Aino Jawo
- Producer(s): Frederic Kennett; Mr. Rogers

Icona Pop singles chronology
"Weekend" (2016)	"Brightside" (2016)	"Windows" (2017)

Music video
- "Brightside" on YouTube

"Brightside" is a song by Swedish synth-pop duo Icona Pop. It was written by Frederic Kennett, Joni Fatora, Mr. Rogers, and Icona Pop, while being produced by Kennett and Rogers. It was released on 21 October 2016, through TEN Music Group, Atlantic Records and Warner Music Group.

== Track listing ==
Digital download
No.	Title	Length
1.	"Brightside"	2:51

Remixes
No.	Title	Length
1.	"Brightside" (Fawks Remix)	3:17
2.	"Brightside" (Borgeous Remix)	4:05
3.	"Brightside" (I M Alec Remix)	2:50
4.	"Brightside" (Just Kiddin Remix)	5:06

== Credits and personnel ==
Credits adapted from Genius.

- Icona Pop – composing, vocals
- Mr. Rogers - composing, producing
- Frederic Kennett - composing, producing
- Joni Fatora - composing
- Delbert Bowers - mixing
- Chris Gehringer - mastering

== Charts ==
Chart (2016)	Peak position
Sweden (Sverigetopplistan)	82
