= Girlfriend (Icona Pop song) =

Single by Icona Pop

from the album This Is... Icona Pop
- Released: 4 June 2013
- Genre: Synth-pop
- Length: 2:50
- Label: TEN; Big Beat
- Songwriters: Marcus "Mack" Sepehrmanesh; Caroline Hjelt; Aino Jawo; Mark Knight; James F. Reynolds; Caweh "CaPa" Passereh; Mikkel S. Eriksen; Tor Erik Hermansen; Tupac Shakur; Tyrone Wrice; Darryl Marvin Harper; Richard "Ricky" Rouse
- Producers: StarGate; Mark Knight (co.); James F. Reynolds (co.); Caweh "CaPa" Passereh (co.)

Icona Pop singles chronology
"We Got the World" (2012)	"Girlfriend" (2013)	"All Night" (2013)

"Girlfriend" is a song by Swedish synth-pop duo Icona Pop. It was released worldwide on 4 June 2013 as a digital download, except for Sweden where it was released on 7 June. The song was written by Icona Pop and Marcus "Mack" Sepehrmanesh and produced by Stargate, co-produced by Caweh Passereh, Mark Knight and James Reynolds. The song interpolates the lyrics from Tupac Shakur's "Me and My Girlfriend".

== Track listing ==
- Digital download
1. "Girlfriend" – 2:50
- Germany single
1. "Girlfriend" – 2:50
2. "Girlfriend" (The Chainsmokers Remix) – 4:37
3. "I Love It" (Tiësto Remix) (feat. Charli XCX) – 5:10
4. "Ready for the Weekend" – 2:42

== Credits and personnel ==
- Lead vocals – Icona Pop
- Lyrics – Marcus Sephermanesh, Aino Jawo, Caroline Hjelt, Mikkel Storleer Eriksen, Tor Erik Hermansen, Marvin Harper, Ricky Rouse, Tupac Shakur, Tyrone Wrice
- Producer, programmer, all instruments – StarGate
- Co-producer – Mark Knight, James F. Reynolds, Caweh Passereh
- Executive producer – Tim Blacksmith, Danny D
- Recorded by – Mikkel S. Eriksen, Miles Walker
- Additional production, additional recording – Elof Loelv
- Additional engineer, assistant engineer – Daniela Rivera
- Mixer – Phil Tan
- Masterer – Colin Leonard
- Label: Big Beat

== Charts ==
Chart performance for "Girlfriend"
Chart (2013)	Peak position
Australia (ARIA)	55
Austria (Ö3 Austria Top 40)	27
Belgium (Ultratip Bubbling Under Flanders)	17
Belgium (Ultratip Bubbling Under Wallonia)	31
Czech Republic (Rádio – Top 100)	40
Germany (GfK)	17
Israel (Media Forest)	17
Italy (FIMI)	70
Sweden (Sverigetopplistan)	57
Switzerland (Schweizer Hitparade)	73

== Certifications ==
Certifications for "Girlfriend"
Region	Certification	Certified units/sales
Sweden (GLF)	Gold	20,000^{‡}
^{‡} Sales+streaming figures based on certification alone.

== Release history ==
Release dates and formats for "Girlfriend"
Region	Date	Format	Label(s)
Worldwide	4 June 2013	Digital download	TEN; Big Beat Records
Sweden	7 June 2013	Digital download	TEN; Universal Music
Germany	23 August 2013	Digital download	TEN; Warner Music
