= Style of Eye =

Swedish DJ and musician (born 1979)

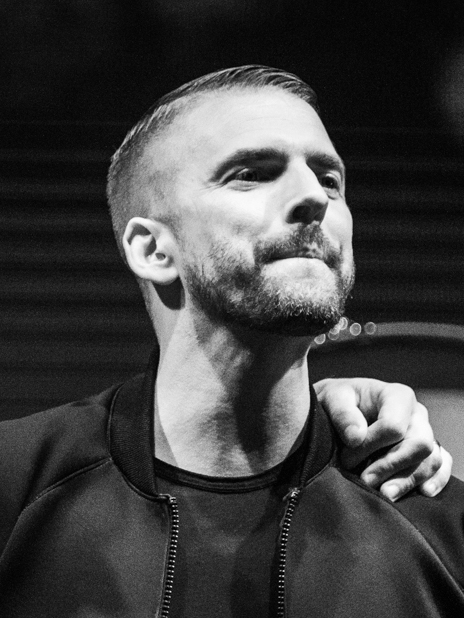
- Style of Eye in 2018

Background information
- Born: Johan Linus Eklöw; 29 August 1979 (age 47); Sundsvall, Västernorrland County, Sweden
- Origin: Sundsvall, Sweden
- Genres: House; techno; electro
- Occupations: DJ; producer; percussionist; songwriter
- Years active: 2003–present
- Label: Sony Music Entertainment
- Formerly of: Galantis
- Website: styleofeye.se

Johan Linus Eklöw (born 29 August 1979), better known by his stage name Style of Eye, is a Swedish DJ, record producer, songwriter and percussionist. He was part of the electropop music group Galantis from 2012.

He has worked with Usher, Kylie Minogue, Lily Allen, Zedd, Miike Snow, Slagsmålsklubben, Tom Staar, Lars Allertz, Soso, and many more through collaborations and/or remixes. In 2012, Linus teamed up with Christian Karlsson to form the super duo, Galantis. His 2013 single "Taken Over", featuring Rebecca & Fiona, peaked at 33 on the Swedish charts. On 23 April 2014, Linus was awarded at ASCAP's 31st Annual Pop Music Awards for Icona Pop's international hit, "I Love It" featuring Charli XCX, which he co-wrote and produced alongside Patrik Berger.

Footprints, his second full-length album, was released in October 2014 on Ultra Records and was nominated for a Swedish Grammy. The album includes the released singles "Kids" (which went platinum in Sweden), "The Game", and "Love Looks".

== Biography ==
=== Early life and career ===
Linus Eklöw was raised in Stockholm, Sweden. His early musical influences included a range of styles: from Stevie Wonder, classical composer Edvard Grieg, soul music, and jazz; electronic musicians Yello and Kraftwerk; to drum & bass producers DJ Hype, DJ Zinc, Photek, and Roni Size. Linus began experimenting with production as early as 14 years old, creating "weird downtempo and trip hop" songs, as well as spinning drum & bass at his school discos. “I’m always looking to connect dots from my own history,” Linus explains.

=== 2000s ===
Eklöw started his house music career in 2003, when he released tracks on Derrick Carter's Chicago label, Classic. During these early years, Linus made "Chicago Jackin'" House music with "Swedish refinement and high energy flair," and performed at various underground shows in Chicago.

In 2007, John Dahlbäck signed Linus’ single "H-Bomb" to his Pickadoll label, that was the beginning for a run of releases that in 2008 would see the release of Style of Eye's debut full-length "Duck, Cover And Hold," in addition to its first single: “Girls”. The album contained 13 tracks that spanned such genres as: Minimal House to nu-trance, all geared towards the dance floor and eventually won the P3-Guld and The Manifest Prize for Best Dance Recording in 2009. 2008 was also the year that Claude VonStroke and his Dirtybird imprint released Linus' The Big Kazoo EP (a first Beatport 10 entry for Eklöw), which was followed up the next year by The Race EP.

=== 2010–present ===
“I’m always about high-energy with a need to push things forward,” says Linus. Releases like "Puss Puss," "We Are Boys" and "Sexx" on Refune Music, his "Wet/Dry" EP on French imprint Sound Pellegrino lead to Skrillex requesting Linus to create the song “Devastate” for the Free Treats Vol II compilation on Skrillex's OWSLA label. In addition, Linus's “Homeless” track alongside Slagsmålsklubben for A-Trak's Fool's Gold was followed up this year with his debut EP on the label, “Ray Dee Oh.”

Linus also was behind the scenes, writing and producing tracks for artists such as Icona Pop (Linus co-wrote the international song "I Love It" as well as much of their forthcoming album), Fenech Soler, and remixed various notable hits: Swedish House Mafia's Save The World, Kylie's Timebomb and Miike Snow's The Wave.

Linus has been an international DJ, gigging at major festivals and club events throughout the world. Eklöw has performed at: Swedish House Mafia's show at the 35,000 capacity Friends Arena in Stockholm, Pier 94 in New York, Tomorrowland, Mysteryland, Snowbombing and Sunburn Festival in India.

Linus teamed up with Christian Karlsson of Miike Snow near the end of 2013 to form the group Galantis, and released their self-titled debut EP (it hit #4 on the iTunes dance chart and was #8 on Shazam's chart of the most Shazamed songs at Miami Music Week). They then took their Galantis live show on the road across the US, including two performances at Coachella's Gobi stage in April 2014. As of May 5, 2014, Galantis has finished most of the songwriting of their first full-length album.

For Eklöw's upcoming second LP entitled "Footprints," various singles have already been released as of August 11, 2014: ‘After Dark’, ‘Kids’, ‘The Game’ and ‘Love Looks’; as well as a track list and album artwork.

== Discography ==
=== Studio albums ===
Album details	Peak positions	Notable singles
Album details	SWE	Notable singles
Duck, Cover and Hold: Date released: December 16, 2008; Record label: Pickadoll Records; Producer: Linus Eklöw	–	"Girls"; "Number Two"
Footprints: Date released: October 7, 2014; Record label: Ultra Records, Sony Music; Producer: Linus Eklöw	53	"Kids"; "The Game"; "Love Looks"

=== EPs ===
Album details	Tracks
Remix Sampler: Year released: 2005; Record label: Classic; Producer: Linus Eklöw	"Gioco" (Style of Eye Remix); "Run Things" (Freaks Last Stand Disco Redo); "Back Then" (Radio Slave Remix)
Duck Cover and Hold Vinyl Part 1: Year released: 2008; Record label: Pickadoll Records; Producer: Linus Eklöw	"Pad Problems"; "Banned, Girls"; "Number Two"
The Big Kazoo EP: Year released: 2008; Record label: Dirtybird; Producer: Linus Eklöw	"The Big Kazoo"; "Hide"
Duck Cover and Hold: Year released: 2008; Format: Vinyl, 12"; Record label: Pickadoll Records; Producer: Linus Eklöw	"Galore"; "Ona"; "Amelie"; "The Last Song"
Homeless EP: Year released: 2008; Record label: Fool's Gold Records; Producer: Linus Eklöw, Slagsmålsklubben	"Homeless"; "Homeless" (Busy P & Neus Remix); "Homeless" (Canblaster Remix); "Homeless" (Canblaster Dub)
Wet / Dry EP: Year released: 2011; Record label: Sound Pellegrino Digital; Producer: Linus Eklöw, Zombie Disco Squad, Darabi, Darling Farah	"Wet, Dry, Dry" (Zombie Disco Squad Remix); "Wet" (Darabi Remix); "Wet" (Darling Farah Remix)
After Dark (Remix EP): Year released: 2013; Record label: Staar Traxx, Southern Fried; Producer: Style of Eye & Tom Staar	"After Dark" (Club Mix); "After Dark" (Nom De Strip Remix); "After Dark" (Hard Rock Sofa Remix); "After Dark" (TV Noise Remix); "After Dark" (Vanilla Ace Remix)

=== Mix albums ===
- Hipp-E and Style of Eye - "Winter Sessions 2" (OM Records - 2008)
- Justin Martin, Klaus Hill & Style of Eye - "The Underground" (Ministry of Sound (Australia) - 2009)
- "Ministry of Sound: The Club Presents Style of Eye" (Ministry of Sound - 2010)

=== Singles ===
Title	Label	Style	Year
"Right Now!"	Classic	House, Tech house	2003
"Gioco"	Classic	House	2004
"You Got That"	Classic	Tech house	2005
"Hydroponic"	Tiny Sticks Records	House, Tech house	2005
"That Thang"	Mouthful Music Chicago	Tech house	2005
"U Dubs"	Bump Music	House, Tech house	2006
"We Got You"	Stylus Music, D:vision Records	House	2006
"They Know" (featuring 7K)	Sugarcane Recordings	House, Electro	2006
"Watch Out!"	Eye Industries	Tech house	2006
"Go Get Gone"	Doubledown Recordings	House, Tech house	2006
"H-Bomb"	Pickadoll Records, Net's Work International	Electro house	2007
"Grab It Now"	Physical Graffiti Music, D:vision Records	Tech house	2007
"Rockett"	Tiny Sticks Records	House	2007
"Kirstenbosch / Minaret"	Fabriquez Musique	Tech house	2007
"Whiz Kid / This Kid" (featuring Freeda)	Bump Music	House, Electro	2007
"Remember This"	Nightshift Recordings	House, Tech house	2007
"Girls"	Pickadoll Records, Pieces Of Eight	Electro house, Tech house	2008
"Whizkid"	Bump Music	Deep house, Tech house	2008
"The Prophet"	Pickadoll Records	Tech House	2008
"The Race"	Dirtybird	Tech House	2009
"Grounded"	Pickadoll Records, Net's Work International, Pieces Of Eight, Pope	House, Tech house	2009
"Colores / Psalm"	Pieces Of Eight	Tech house	2009
"Homeless" (featuring Slagsmålsklubben)	Fool's Gold Records	Electro	2010
"Puss Puss"	Refune Music	House, Electro	2010
"Antidote" (featuring Magnus the Magnus)	Horehaus	Techno	2010
"Wet / Dry"	Sound Pellegrino	House, Electro, Tech House	2011
"We Are Boys"	Refune Music	Electro, Tech House	2011
"Sexx"	Refune Music	Progressive House	2011
"Ray Dee Oh" (featuring Gina Turner)	Fool's Gold Records	Electro, House	2012
"Headlights"	Forza Horizon: Swedish Tracks	Electro, House	2012
"Devour"	Robotberget	House	2012
"Devastate Dub"	OWSLA	Electronica, Electro house	2012
"After Dark" (with Tom Staar)	Wall Recordings	Progressive House	2013
"Kids" (featuring Soso)	RCA, Sony Music	Electro	2014
"The Game" (featuring SAL)	RCA, Sony Music, Ultra Records	Electro	2014
"Love Looks" (featuring Lars Allertz)	RCA, Sony Music, Ultra Records	Electro	2014

=== As featured artist ===
Title	Label	Style	Year
"That Laughing Track" (Crookers featuring Style of Eye & Carli)	Southern Fried Records	House, Electro	2012
"Wallpaper" (Staygold featuring Style of Eye, Pow)	Virgin EMI	Pop, Electro, Disco	2012
"Taken Over" (Rebecca & Fiona featuring Style of Eye)	Universal Music AB	Electronic, Pop	2013

=== Remixes ===
- "Roar (Style of Eye Remix)" - Axwell & Sebastian Ingrosso (Walt Disney Records - 2013)
- "Open Your Eyes (Style of Eye Remix)" - Alex Metric & Steve Angello (Virgin UK - 2011)
- "Save The World (Style of Eye & Carli Remix)" - Swedish House Mafia featuring John Martin (singer) (Virgin UK - 2011)
- "Go Tigers (Style of Eye Remix)" - Tony Senghore (Midnight Munchies - 2011)
- "Ohrwurm (Style of Eye Remix)" - Tommy Trash (Downright - 2011)
- "I Love It (Style of Eye Remix)" - Icona Pop featuring Charli XCX (Big Beat Records - 2012)
- "Manners (Style of Eye Remix)" - Icona Pop (Big Beat Records - 2012)
- "Summer Life (Style of Eye Remix)" - The Penelopes (Pour Le Monde Ltd - 2012)
- "Timebomb (Style Of Eye Remix)" - Kylie Minogue (Astralwerks - 2012)
- "The Wave (Style of Eye Remix)" - Miike Snow (Universal Republic Records - 2012)
- "Bonanza (Style of Eye Remix)" - Mayka (Uniform Beat - 2012)
- "Who's Gonna Love Me (Style of Eye Remix)" - Soso (PNC Do It Yourself Bitch - 2012)
- "Clarity (Style Of Eye Remix)" - Zedd featuring Foxes (Interscope Records - 2013)
