= I Love It (Icona Pop song) =

2012 single by Icona Pop featuring Charli XCX

Single by Icona Pop featuring Charli XCX

from the album Icona Pop and This Is... Icona Pop
- Released: 9 May 2012
- Recorded: 2011
- Genre: Synth-pop; dance-pop
- Length: 2:37
- Label: TEN
- Songwriters: Charlotte Aitchison; Patrik Berger; Linus Eklöw
- Producers: Patrik Berger; Style of Eye

Icona Pop singles chronology
"Mind Your Manners" (2011)	"I Love It" (2012)	"We Got the World" (2012)

Charli XCX singles chronology
"Nuclear Seasons" (2011)	"I Love It" (2012)	"You're the One" (2012)

Music video
- "I Love It" on YouTube

"I Love It" is a song by Swedish synth-pop duo Icona Pop featuring vocals from British singer Charli XCX. It was released as a single in May 2012 as a digital download in Sweden, where it peaked at number two on the singles chart. The song, touching on incompatibility and breakup, was added to their debut studio album, Icona Pop (2012), as well as their second EP, Iconic (2012), and their debut international album, This Is... Icona Pop (2013). "I Love It" was written by Charli XCX and its producers were Patrik Berger and Style of Eye.

The song received positive reviews from music critics, and publications Rolling Stone and Pitchfork included it on their year-end lists for 2012. The song went on to become Icona Pop and Charli XCX's first US hit, peaking at number seven on the Billboard Hot 100 and was certified five times platinum by the Recording Industry Association of America, denoting over 5 million units sold in the United States. In June 2013, over a year after it was released elsewhere, the song charted at number 1 on the UK Singles Chart. It has gone on to sell 4.3 million certified downloads.

== Background ==
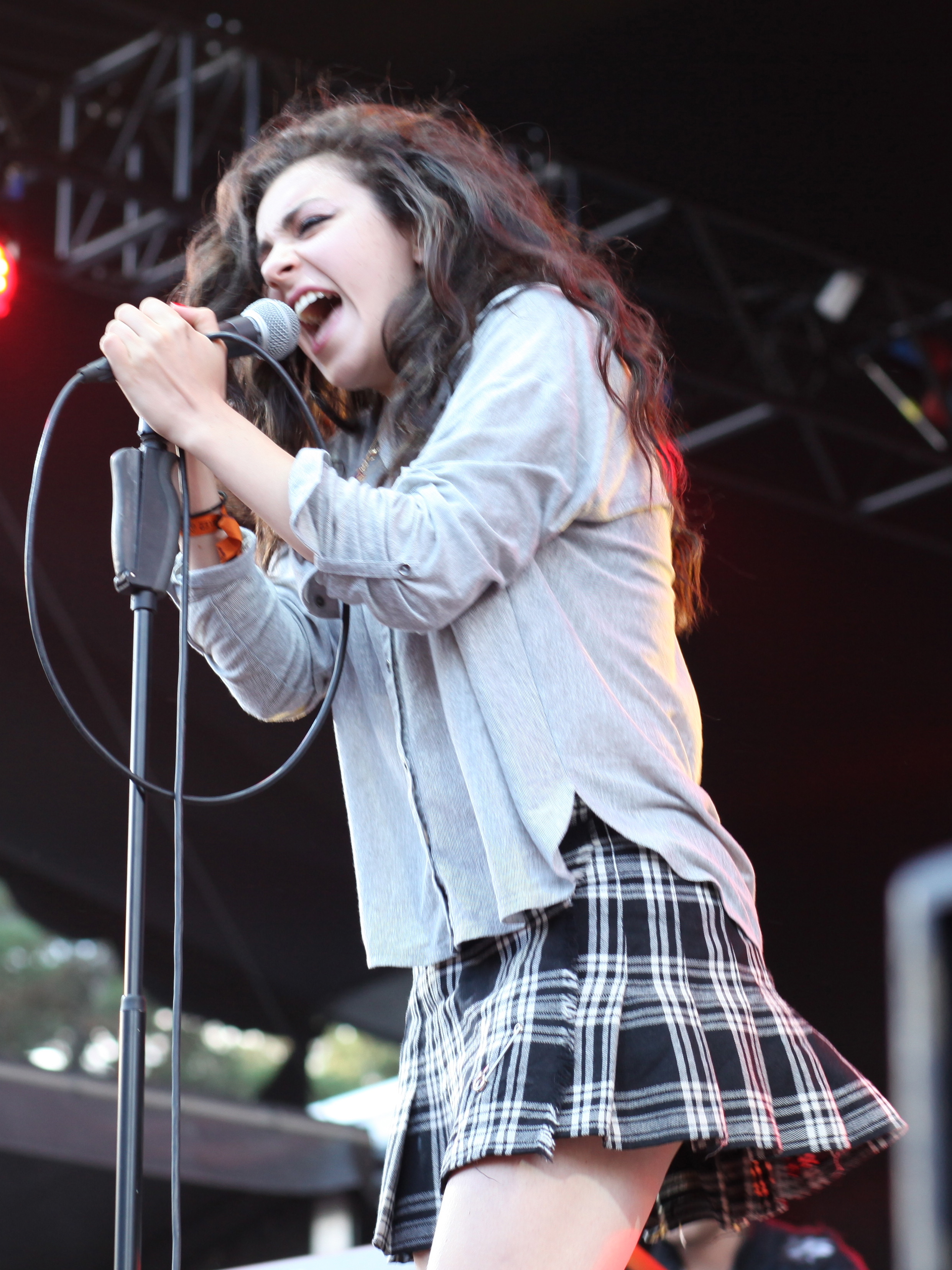
Singer Charli XCX (pictured in 2013) co-wrote and recorded an earlier version of "I Love It".

The song was written by Charli XCX, whom Icona Pop met several times in London. Swedish producer Patrik Berger sent Charli XCX two beats, and she quickly wrote songs for each of them, one of which became "I Love It" and the other of which became her following single "You're the One". However, she later stated that she knew she would not end up releasing it herself because she could not reconcile it with her sound.

While recording "Good for You" with Icona Pop, Berger presented them with Charli XCX's work on "I Love It". Band member Aino Jawo said she felt a connection to the song because it mirrored her own experiences, and the line "You're from the 70s but I'm a 90s bitch" reminded her of an older man she had known. Member Caroline Hjelt described Charli XCX's original demo as "more cute, in a way…really cool and cocky". Icona Pop approached Swedish producer Style of Eye to make a rougher version of the track, telling him, "We want the punkiness. We want the 'fuck it' feeling."

== Composition ==
"I Love It"
The song's chorus features all three singers shouting "I don't care / I love it" in unison.

"I Love It (Original Demo)"
The original version of the song before its composition was reworked.

"I Love It" is set in common time with a tempo of 126 beats per minute (allegro), and is described as a synth-pop, and dance-pop, song. It is written in A♭ major, with an authentic cadence for the main chord progression. Billboard critic Jessica Hopper defined the instrumental by its "swells of revving synths" and prominent sub-bass sounds. Pitchfork writer Lindsay Zoladz commented that the song was "basically just two-and-a-half minutes of drop"; colleague Larry Fitzmaurice noted the track's maximalist approach fit the contemporary trends in electronic and pop music.

The song's lyrics describe breaking up with an older boyfriend. In its chorus, Icona Pop and Charli XCX shout in unison "I don't care / I love it". Critics compared the song's breakup narrative to Kelly Clarkson's 2004 single "Since U Been Gone", and journalist Chuck Eddy wrote in a piece for Spin that the track's brattiness was similar to that of British band Shampoo.

== Release and promotion ==
"I Love It" was released in Sweden in May 2012. It entered the Swedish Singles Chart the following month at number 48, and after two months on the chart, the song peaked at number two for three consecutive weeks. It was the opening theme song for Snooki & JWoww, which first aired on June 21, 2012. After its January 2013 appearance on the season 2 episode "Cocaine Blues" of Girls, the song performed better in digital downloads than it had upon initial release. Ten days later it entered the Billboard Hot 100, eventually climbing to number seven on the chart. Jawo and Hjelt's first performance with Charli XCX happened in April 2013, after seeing her back stage at a South by Southwest showcase where both acts were playing.

In June 2013, several cover versions of the song entered the UK Singles Chart, including one by vlogger Venus Angelic. When Icona Pop released their version, it entered at the top of the chart, overtaking Robin Thicke's "Blurred Lines" featuring T.I. and Pharrell Williams.

== Critical reception ==
"I Love It" was met with positive reviews from music critics. The song placed 15th on The Village Voice's 2012 Pazz & Jop list, and it rose to eighth place the following year. Pitchfork labeled it "Best New Music", calling the song "delectable, empowering, infinitely repeatable". Pitchfork later listed the song number 50 on its "Top 100 Tracks of 2012" list. Rolling Stone placed "I Love It" at number 35 on its year-end list, naming it "the Euro-slut club jam of the summer". Amrit Singh for Stereogum described it as "fun", Heather Phares commented Jawo and Hjelt "half-sung, half-shouted vocals and revved-up synths make the song inescapably catchy". Kat Bein of the Miami New Times called the song a "feminist pop anthem". In 2019, Stereogum and Pitchfork ranked the song as the 117th and 197th best song of the 2010s respectively.

== Music video ==
The music video for "I Love It" was directed by Fredrik Etoall. The video was shot in a day by friends of the band while they were in Paris. It shows Jawo and Hjelt playing a show for a crowd shouting the lyrics and dancing, with additional shots from backstage and an after-party. It also includes outdoor shots of them wearing fringed jackets that they made. Charli XCX does not appear in the video.

== Track listing ==
Digital download
No.	Title	Length
1.	"I Love It" (featuring Charli XCX)	2:37

Remixes
No.	Title	Length
1.	"I Love It" (Cobra Starship Remix) (Radio Edit)	3:33
2.	"I Love It" (Nari & Milani Remix) (Radio Edit)	3:20
3.	"I Love It" (Style of Eye Remix)	4:40
4.	"I Love It" (Sick Individuals Club Edit)	5:57
5.	"I Love It" (Sazon Booya Moombahton Remix)	4:22
6.	"I Love It" (Volta Bureau Remix)	5:25
7.	"I Love It" (Wayne G & LFB Remix) (Radio Edit)	3:44
8.	"I Love It" (Steven Redant '90s Bitch Club Mix)	6:53
9.	"I Love It" (Tiësto's Club Life Remix)	4:30

Remixes (Part 2)
No.	Title	Length
1.	"I Love It" (Nari & Milani Remix)	7:00
2.	"I Love It" (Sick Individuals Remix)	6:45
3.	"I Love It" (Skitzofrenix Remix)	6:03
4.	"I Love It" (Hot Mouth Remix)	5:41
5.	"I Love It" (Style of Eye Dub)	4:41
6.	"I Love It" (Fukkk Offf Remix)	4:48
7.	"I Love It" (Apocalypto Remix)	6:13
8.	"I Love It" (Cobra Starship Remix)	5:08
9.	"I Love It" (Wayne G & LFB Club Mix)	6:27
10.	"I Love It" (Steven Redant '90s Bitch Club Mix)	6:52
11.	"I Love It" (Solidisco Mix)	5:18

CD single
No.	Title	Length
1.	"I Love It" (Original Version)	2:37
2.	"I Love It" (Fukkk Offf Remix)	4:48

Beatport Remixes
No.	Title	Length
1.	"I Love It" (Nari & Milani Remix)	7:00
2.	"I Love It" (Sick Individuals Remix)	6:45
3.	"I Love It" (Skitzofrenix Remix)	6:03
4.	"I Love It" (Hot Mouth Remix)	5:41
5.	"I Love It" (Sazon Booya Moombahton Remix)	4:22
6.	"I Love It" (Volta Bureau Remix)	5:24
7.	"I Love It" (Style of Eye Remix)	4:39
8.	"I Love It" (Style of Eye Dub)	4:41
9.	"I Love It" (Fukkk Offf Remix)	4:48
10.	"I Love It" (Apocalypto Remix)	6:13
11.	"I Love It" (Cobra Starship Remix)	5:08

== Charts ==
=== Weekly charts ===
Weekly chart performance for "I Love It"
Chart (2012–2014)	Peak position
Australia (ARIA)	3
Austria (Ö3 Austria Top 40)	3
Belgium (Ultratop 50 Flanders)	6
Belgium (Ultratop Flanders Dance)	2
Belgium (Ultratop 50 Wallonia)	20
Belgium (Ultratop Wallonia Dance)	3
Brazil (Billboard Brasil Hot 100)	63
Brazil Hot Pop Songs	22
Canada Hot 100 (Billboard)	9
Canada CHR/Top 40 (Billboard)	11
Canada Hot AC (Billboard)	19
Czech Republic Airplay (ČNS IFPI)	15
Czech Republic Singles Digital (ČNS IFPI)	92
Euro Digital Song Sales (Billboard)	2
France (SNEP)	18
Germany (GfK)	3
Hungary (Dance Top 40)	10
Hungary (Rádiós Top 40)	3
Ireland (IRMA)	8
Israel International Airplay (Media Forest)	2
Italy (FIMI)	3
Japan Hot 100 (Billboard)	12
Mexico Anglo (Monitor Latino)	3
Netherlands (Dutch Top 40)	13
Netherlands (Mega Dance Top 30)	4
Netherlands (Single Top 100)	16
Netherlands (Mega Top 50)	10
New Zealand (Recorded Music NZ)	9
Portugal (Billboard)	3
Romania (Airplay 100)	55
Scottish Singles Sales (Official Charts)	1
Slovakia Airplay (ČNS IFPI)	15
Slovenia (SloTop50)	8
Spain (Promusicae)	4
Sweden (Sverigetopplistan)	2
Switzerland (Schweizer Hitparade)	10
UK Singles (Official Charts)	1
US Billboard Hot 100	7
US Hot Dance/Electronic Songs (Billboard)	1
US Adult Pop Airplay (Billboard)	11
US Dance Club Songs (Billboard)	25
US Dance Airplay (Billboard)	1
US Pop Airplay (Billboard)	3
US Rhythmic Airplay (Billboard)	24
Venezuela Pop Rock General (Record Report)	7

2025–2026 weekly chart performance for "I Love It"
Chart (2025–2026)	Peak position
Germany Dance (GfK)	10
Poland Airplay (OLiS)	98

=== Year-end charts ===
Annual chart rankings for "I Love It"
Chart (2012)	Position
Australia (ARIA)	63
Sweden (Sverigetopplistan)	24
Chart (2013)	Position
Australia (ARIA)	41
Austria (Ö3 Austria Top 40)	11
Belgium (Ultratop Flanders)	20
Belgium (Ultratop Wallonia)	38
Canada (Canadian Hot 100)	29
France (SNEP)	47
Germany (Media Control AG)	19
Hungary (Dance Top 40)	27
Hungary (Rádiós Top 40)	12
Italy (FIMI)	13
Japan (Japan Hot 100)	95
Netherlands (Dutch Top 40)	39
Netherlands (Single Top 100)	65
Slovenia (SloTop50)	25
Spain (PROMUSICAE)	28
Sweden (Sverigetopplistan)	71
Switzerland (Schweizer Hitparade)	18
UK Singles (Official Charts Company)	19
US Billboard Hot 100	28
US Adult Top 40 (Billboard)	47
US Hot Dance/Electronic Songs (Billboard)	4
US Mainstream Top 40 (Billboard)	23
Chart (2014)	Position
Hungary (Dance Top 40)	71

=== Decade-end charts ===
Chart (2010–2019)	Position
US Hot Dance/Electronic Songs (Billboard)	40

== Sales and certifications ==
Region	Certification	Certified units/sales
Australia (ARIA)	7× Platinum	490,000^{‡}
Austria (IFPI Austria)	Platinum	30,000^{*}
Belgium (BRMA)	Gold	15,000^{*}
Canada (Music Canada)	5× Platinum	400,000^{‡}
Denmark (IFPI Danmark)	Platinum	90,000^{‡}
Germany (BVMI)	3× Gold	450,000^{^}
Italy (FIMI)	2× Platinum	60,000^{*}
Mexico (AMPROFON)	Gold	30,000^{*}
New Zealand (RMNZ)	Gold	7,500^{*}
South Korea (Gaon) Iconic EP version	—	182,920
South Korea (Gaon Chart) Single version	—	95,498
Spain (Promusicae)	Platinum	60,000^{‡}
Switzerland (IFPI Switzerland)	Platinum	30,000^{^}
United Kingdom (BPI)	3× Platinum	1,800,000^{‡}
United States (RIAA)	5× Platinum	5,000,000^{‡}
Streaming
Denmark (IFPI Danmark)	Gold	900,000^{†}
Spain (Promusicae)	Gold	4,000,000^{†}
Sweden (GLF)	6× Platinum	48,000,000^{†}
^{*} Sales figures based on certification alone.^{^} Shipments figures based on certification alone.^{‡} Sales+streaming figures based on certification alone.^{†} Streaming-only figures based on certification alone.

== Cover versions ==
Several cover versions have charted in the UK.

Artist	Peak position	Reference
Loreen Harris	74	
Venus Angelic	71	
Remix Junkies	49	
Remix Chix	61	
New Music Masters	51	
Glee cast	90	

In 2014, American hard rock band Buckcherry covered the song on their EP Fuck with modified lyrics.

In 2017, Swedish singer Moneybrother released a punk rock inspired cover version of the song as a part of the eighth season of Så mycket bättre. The track received mixed to positive reviews, ultimately failing to chart.

In August 2025, American singer Molly Tuttle covered the song on her So Long Little Miss Sunshine album, using unusually gentle and lilting vocals and guitar.

English producer and Charli XCX's longtime collaborator A. G. Cook heavily sampled "I Love It" in his 2025 song "Dread", which served as the lead single from the soundtrack for Charli XCX's 2026 mockumentary film The Moment.

== Release history ==
Region	Date	Format	Label
Sweden	9 May 2012		TEN
United States	5 February 2013	Mainstream airplay	Atlantic; Big Beat Records
United Kingdom	23 June 2013	Digital EP	TEN; Warner
