= Talk About (song) =

Single by Rain Radio and DJ Craig Gorman
- Released: 14 May 2021
- Genre: House
- Length: 2:42
- Label: Polydor
- Songwriters: Nelly Furtado; Rodney Jerkins; Craig Gorman; Robbie Yates; Yjneb Nösbig
- Producers: Billen Ted; Craig Gorman; Robbie Yates; Yjneb Nösbig

Music video
- "Talk About" on YouTube

"Talk About" is a song by English DJ Rain Radio and Irish DJ Craig Gorman.

Released on 14 May 2021, it is a dance track based on an interpolation of "Big Hoops (Bigger the Better)" by Canadian singer Nelly Furtado. It became a hit in the UK, debuting at No. 44 (for the week ending 15 July 2021) after amassing a sales total of 9,289 units, and was a new entry at No. 42 in Ireland. The song eventually reached the top 10 in both countries, at No. 9.

== Charts ==
=== Weekly charts ===
Weekly chart performance for "Talk About"
Chart (2021)	Peak position
Hungary (Single Top 40)	38
Ireland (IRMA)	9
Netherlands (Dutch Top 40)	18
Netherlands (Single Top 100)	37
Poland (Polish Airplay Top 100)	20
UK Singles (OCC)	9
UK Dance (OCC)	4

=== Year-end charts ===
Year-end chart performance for "Talk About"
Chart (2021)	Position
Netherlands (Dutch Top 40)	90
UK Singles (OCC)	80

== Certifications ==
Certifications for "Talk About"
Region	Certification	Certified units/sales
Poland (ZPAV)	Platinum	50,000^{‡}
United Kingdom (BPI)	Platinum	600,000^{‡}
^{‡} Sales+streaming figures based on certification alone.
