= Icona Pop =

Swedish synth-pop duo

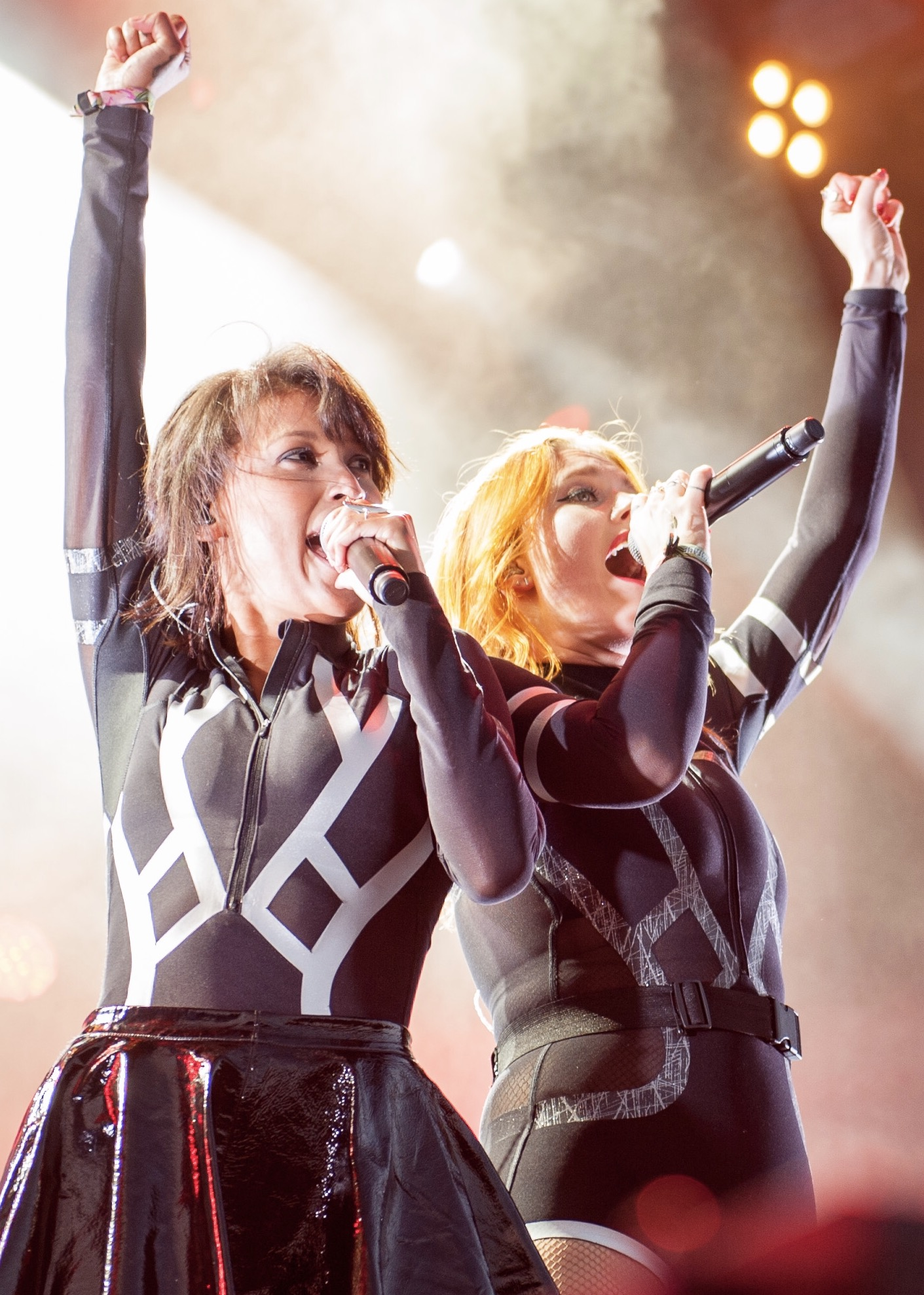
- Icona Pop (Aino Jawo, left, and Caroline Hjelt) performing at the Way Out West festival in Gothenburg, Sweden, in August 2014

Background information
- Origin: Stockholm, Sweden
- Genres: Synth-pop; electropop; dance-pop; electro house
- Works: Discography
- Years active: 2009–present
- Labels: TEN; Big Beat; Atlantic; Ultra Music; Universal
- Members: Aino Jawo; Caroline Hjelt
- Website: iconapop.com

Icona Pop (English: /aɪˈkɒnə ˈpɒp/ eye-KON-ə POP) are a Swedish synth-pop duo that formed in 2009, with electro house and indie pop music influences. Its two members, Aino Jawo (born 7 July 1986) and Caroline Hjelt (born 8 November 1987), grew up in Stockholm and created what the Swedish press has described as music which "you can both laugh and cry to at the same time". They signed to TEN Music Group in 2009 and are currently also in a label deal with Ultra Music. Their biggest hit to date has been "I Love It".

== Career ==
=== Beginning ===
Caroline Hjelt (born 8 November 1987, of a Swedish mother and Sweden-Finnish father) and Aino Jawo (born 7 July 1986, of a Finnish mother and Gambian father) attended the same music school in Stockholm, but met by chance at a party in February 2009 and formed the duo. Four weeks later, they had written songs for their first performance. Two years later, the two described their music as "classical pop melodies with drums and synths".

The English-language press, including NME, The Guardian, Rolling Stone and Pitchfork Media, have praised the duo. The Guardian described the debut single "Manners" as "effortlessly cool". The duo have worked in the studio with producers including Style of Eye, Patrik Berger (Robyn), Elof Loelv (Niki & The Dove) and Starsmith.

In fall 2012, they released an extended play Iconic in the US and the album Icona Pop in Sweden. The duo have performed in the aforementioned countries as well as countries such as the UK, Germany, Italy, Canada and Hong Kong, and have also been interviewed by members of the Swedish and worldwide press.

=== 2012–2013: Breakthrough with "I Love It" and This Is... Icona Pop ===
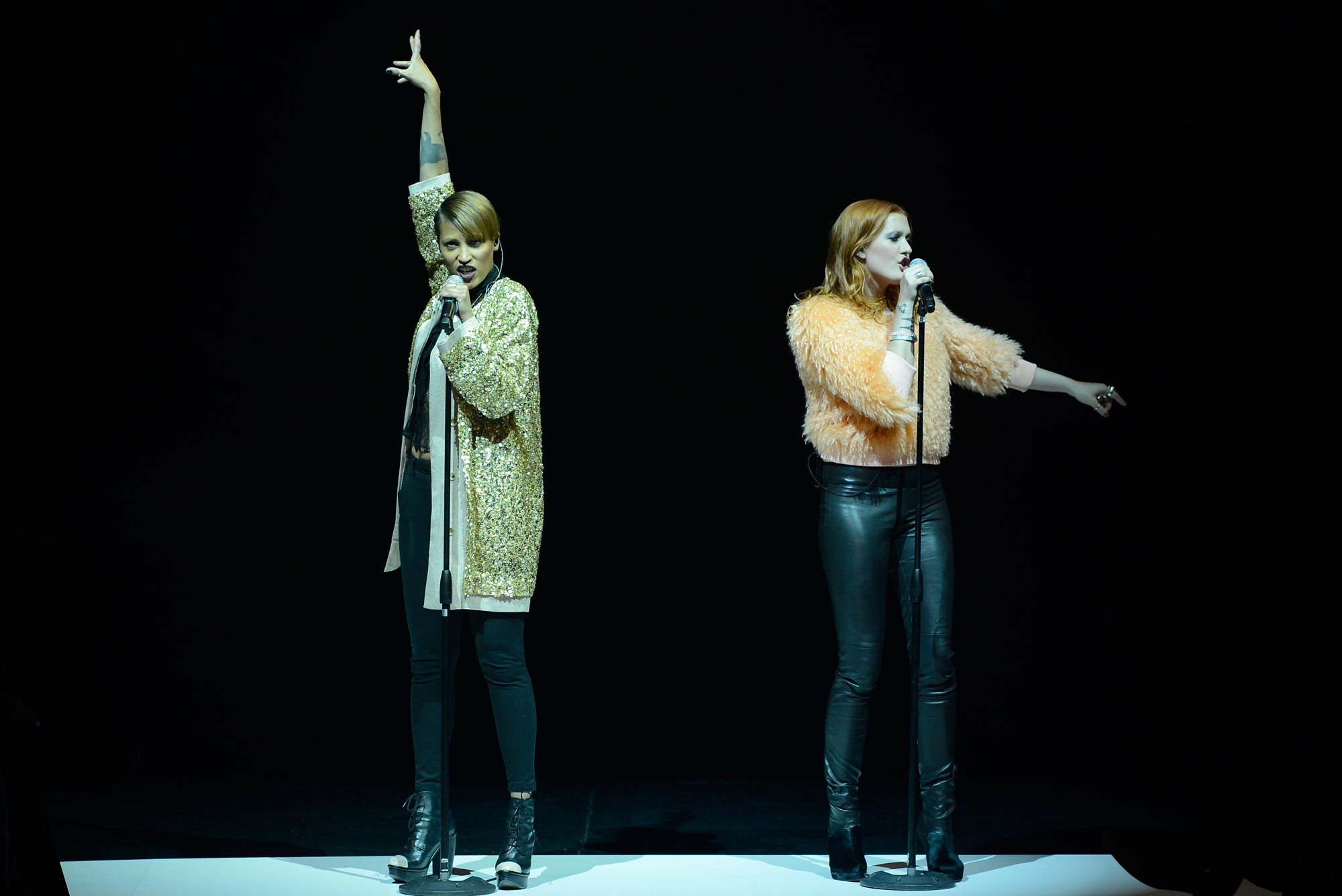
Icona Pop at Michalsky StyleNite of Berlin Fashion Week, August 2013

In the summer of 2012, they took part in a number of festivals including electro music festival Summerburst in Gothenburg and also appeared at the Stockholm Stadium, at the start of an international festival and broadcast via Sveriges Television (SVT).

"I Love It", a pre-release of their self-titled debut album Icona Pop charted on Sverigetopplistan, the official Swedish singles chart. The song, which features vocals from British recording artist Charli XCX, was also featured in the 2012 video game Need for Speed: Most Wanted, in a German television commercial for Coca-Cola Light in January 2013, the theme song to the MTV reality-television series Snooki & JWoww, and in an episode of the HBO comedy-drama television series Girls and the popular vampire-teen drama television series The Vampire Diaries. The second single "Ready for the Weekend" was released on 11 September 2012. Both tracks appear on their second EP, released on 16 October 2012. "I Love It" was also used in the commercial for the Samsung Galaxy S4.

Their EP Iconic EP peaked at No. 21 on the U.S. iTunes dance chart. In 2013, they embarked on a tour of the United States with Passion Pit and Matt & Kim. In January 2013, "I Love It" was featured in the third episode of the second season of Girls, the comedy-drama series created by Lena Dunham. Two months later, the duo was named one of Fuse's 30 must-see artists at the South by Southwest festival. The same month, "I Love It" was featured in the 16th episode of the fourth season, "Bring It On", of The Vampire Diaries. On 26 March 2013, "I Love It" was performed on the week 2 results episode of Dancing with the Stars. On 3 May 2013, the duo performed "I Love It" on the NBC late-night talk show Late Night with Jimmy Fallon and on ABC's Good Morning America morning news/entertainment show. Three days later, "I Love It" was featured in the Fox musical-comedy series, Glee. The song was performed by the "New Directions" in Glee's 22nd and final episode of season four, "All or Nothing". It was also featured in a 2013 ShoeDazzle commercial.

On 19 May 2013, the duo performed "I Love It" at the Billboard Music Awards, wearing custom lit outfits by designer Geoffrey Mac. The song was featured in a commercial for the WNBA's forthcoming season that was aired during the 4th quarter of Game 7 of the Heat-Pacers Eastern Conference Championship game on 3 June 2013. It was also featured in a commercial during the Spurs-Heat basketball game on 9 June 2013.

On 4 June 2013, the duo released their single "Girlfriend". Icona Pop revealed in an interview that they recorded their international album with all new songs. They said that "the new album isn't just going to be sixteen tracks like 'I Love It'" and that they are trying new genres and sounds. In July 2013, they received two Teen Choice awards for Choice Music Breakout Group and Choice Single: Group.

On 28 July 2013, "All Night" was released as the official third single from the album. It gained moderate success on European charts. On 4 August 2013, the duo visited Montreal, where they performed at the Osheaga Festival. They also appeared on The Ellen DeGeneres Show in December of that year.

=== 2014–present ===
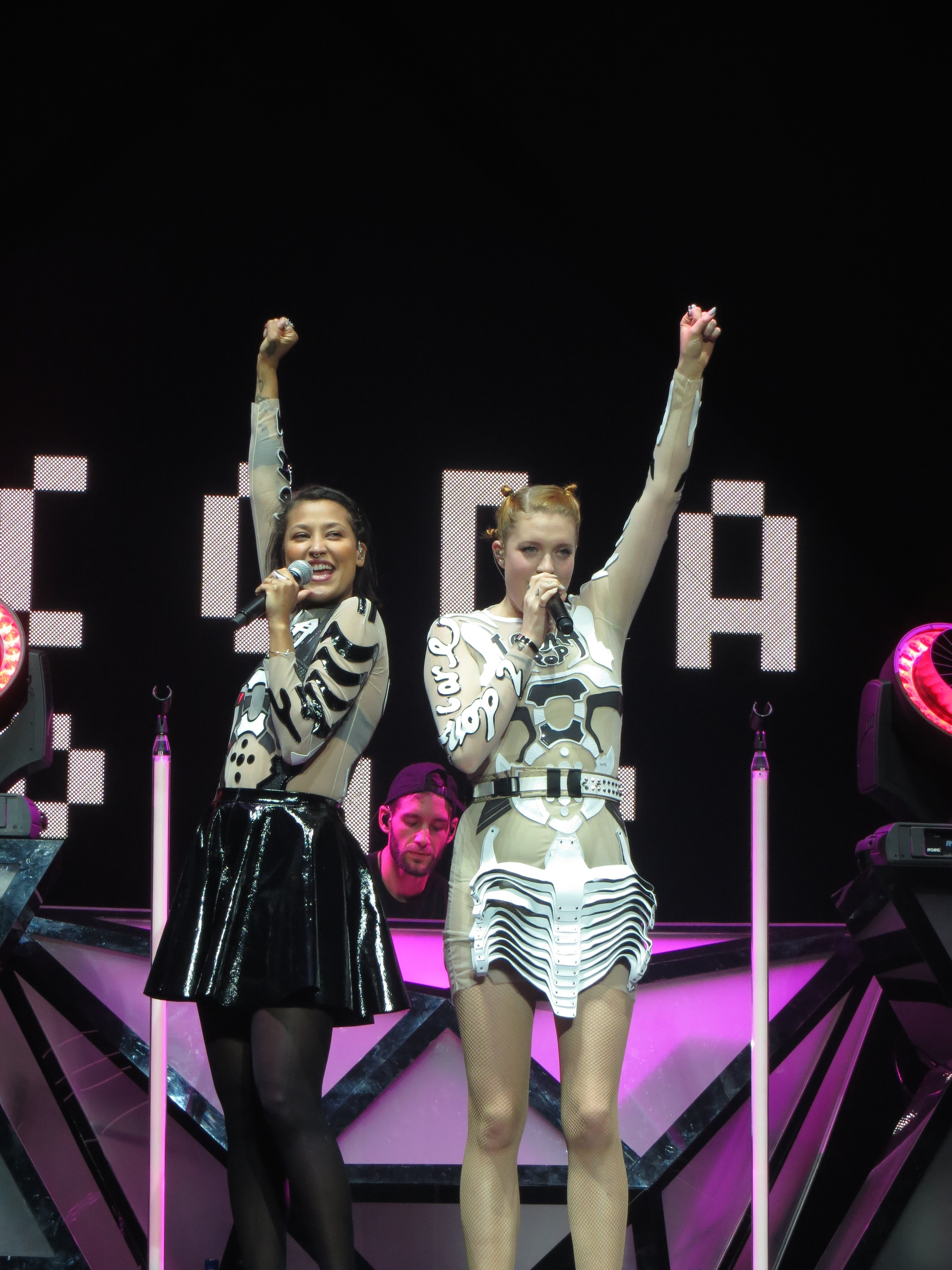
Icona Pop at The Prismatic World Tour, May 2014.

On 23 June 2014, the duo released a new single called "Get Lost" which gained less international attention. In the same period, the duo also performed as the opening act for Katy Perry and Miley Cyrus tours. They also collaborated with Tiesto for the song "Let's Go" and with Cobra Starship for the single "Never Been in Love" which became a successful hit in Italy.

On 26 May 2015, the duo released the single "Emergency", a collaboration with Erik Hassle. The song peaked a few weeks later on the Billboard Dance Chart, making their second single to top that chart after All Night. The song was also featured in the video game FIFA 16. In July, the EP Emergency was released. It includes the critically acclaimed First Time and the smash-hit Clap Snap. The duo was announced as an opening act for the North American leg of One Direction's "On the Road Again" tour in 2015. Also in 2015, their song "We Got The World" was featured in the movie Pitch Perfect 2. On 23 February 2016, Icona Pop performed a new single, "Someone Who Can Dance" at the Grammis in Stockholm.

On 20 October 2016, the duo released their single "Brightside". On 16 June 2017, Icona Pop released a new single "GIRLS GIRLS", co-written by Tove Lo. In October 2017, they released a song with Australian duo Peking Duk called "Let You Down". In late December 2017, the duo released an EP called "Så mycket bättre 2017 – Tolkningarna" including 7 covered songs. In early March 2018, the duo collaborated with Avon on a music video called "All My Girls". In late April 2018, the duo was featured on a song called "Faded Away" by Sweater Beats. In late May 2018, Icona Pop said on their social media that they were currently working on their third studio album. In June 2019 the duo performed at St. Louis Pridefest. Icona Pop released a song with R3hab called "This Is How We Party" on 8 February 2019. On 26 July 2019, the duo returned with the first single from their upcoming third studio album – "Next Mistake". The duo have signed to Ultra Music as of 2019.

Icona Pop released their third studio album Club Romantech in September 2023 through Swedish independent record label TEN Music Group and Ultra. The album marks the duo's first studio release in ten years.

== Discography ==
- Icona Pop (2012)
- This Is... Icona Pop (2013)
- Club Romantech (2023)
- Ritual (2026)

== Filmography ==
=== Film ===
| Year | Title | Aino's role | Caroline's role | Notes |
|---|---|---|---|---|
| 2016 | Trolls | Satin (voice) | Chenille (voice) | |
| 2017 | Trolls Holiday | Satin (voice) | Chenille (voice) | Short film |
| 2019 | Trolls World Tour | Satin (voice) | Chenille (voice) | |
| 2023 | Trolls Band Together | Satin (voice) | Chenille (voice) | |

=== Television ===
| Year | Title | Aino's role | Caroline's role | Notes |
|---|---|---|---|---|
| 2023 | Drag Race Sverige | N/A | Herself | Guest Judge (Season 1, Episode 6) |
| 2024 | RuPaul’s Drag Race | Herself | Herself | Guest Judges (Season 16, Episode 5) |
| 2024 | RuPaul’s Drag Race: Untucked | Herself | Herself | Guests (Season 15, Episode 5) |

== Tours ==
As supporting act

- Marina and the Diamonds' The Lonely Hearts Club Tour (North America, 2013)
- Miley Cyrus' Bangerz Tour (North America and Europe, 2014)
- Katy Perry's Prismatic World Tour (United Kingdom, 2014)
- One Direction's On the Road Again Tour (North America, 2015)

== Awards ==
- Rober Awards Music Poll

| Year | Nominee / work | Award | Result |
|---|---|---|---|
| 2012 | Themselves | Guilty Pleasure | Nominated |

- Rockbjörnen

| Year | Nominee / work | Award | Result |
|---|---|---|---|
| 2018 | Themselves | Årets livegrupp | Nominated |

- P3 Guld

| Year | Nominee / work | Award | Result |
|---|---|---|---|
| 2014 | This Is... Icona Pop | Årets grupp | Nominated |
| 2014 | Themselves | Guldmicken (årets liveartist) | Nominated |

- Sweden GAFFA Awards

| Year | Nominee / work | Award | Result |
|---|---|---|---|
| 2018 | Themselves | Årets Grupp | Won |

- Gaygalan Awards

| Year | Nominee / work | Award | Result |
|---|---|---|---|
| 2014 | Themselves | Årets Artist | Nominated |

- Scandipop Awards

| Year | Nominee / work | Award | Result |
|---|---|---|---|
| 2014 | This Is... Icona Pop | Best Group Album | Nominated |
| 2014 | Themselves | Best Group | Nominated |
| 2017 | Themselves | Best Group | Won |
| 2018 | Themselves | Best Group | Won |

- Teen Choice Awards

| Year | Nominated work | Award | Result |
|---|---|---|---|
| 2013 | "I Love It" (with Charli XCX) | Choice Single: Group | Nominated |
| 2015 | Icona Pop | Choice Music Group: Female | Nominated |

- Billboard Music Awards

| Year | Nominated work | Award | Result |
|---|---|---|---|
| 2014 | "I Love It" (with Charli XCX) | Top Dance/Electronic Song | Nominated |

- MTV Europe Music Awards

| Year | Nominated work | Award | Result |
|---|---|---|---|
| 2014 | Icona Pop | Best Swedish Act | Nominated |

- Hungarian Music Awards

| Year | Nominated work | Award | Result |
|---|---|---|---|
| 2014 | This Is... Icona Pop | Modern Pop/Rock Album of the Year | Nominated |

- iHeartRadio Music Awards

| Year | Nominated work | Award | Result | Ref. |
|---|---|---|---|---|
| 2014 | "I Love It" (with Charli XCX) | Best Lyrics | Nominated | |
| 2014 | Icona Pop | Best New Artist | Nominated | |

- SESAC Pop Awards

| Year | Nominated work | Award | Result |
|---|---|---|---|
| 2014 | "I Love It" (with Charli XCX) | Songwriter of the Year | Won |
| 2014 | "I Love It" (with Charli XCX) | Song of the Year | Won |

- Grammis Award

| Year | Nominated work | Award | Result | Ref. |
|---|---|---|---|---|
| 2013 | "I Love It" | Song of the Year | Nominated | |
| 2013 | Icona Pop | Newcomer of the Year | Won | |
| 2013 | Icona Pop | Electronic/Dance of the Year | Nominated | |
| 2014 | Icona Pop | Artist of the Year | Nominated | |
| 2014 | Icona Pop | Electronic/Dance of the Year | Won | |
| 2016 | "Emergency" | Song of the Year | Nominated | |
| 2018 | Icona Pop | Electronic/Dance of the Year | Nominated | |

- APRA Awards (Australia)

| Year | Nominated work | Award | Result | Ref. |
|---|---|---|---|---|
| APRA Music Awards of 2019 | "Let You Down" by Peking Duk and Icona Pop | Dance of the Year | Nominated | |

- Other awards

| Award | Nominated work | Category | Result | Ref. |
|---|---|---|---|---|
| Gaffa | Icona Pop | Swedish Breakthrough of the Year | Won | |
| P3 Gold | I Love It | Song of the Year | Won | |
| Elle Gala | Icona Pop | Best Dressed Duo | Won | |

== See also ==
- Swedish popular music
