= Benjamin Ingrosso discography =

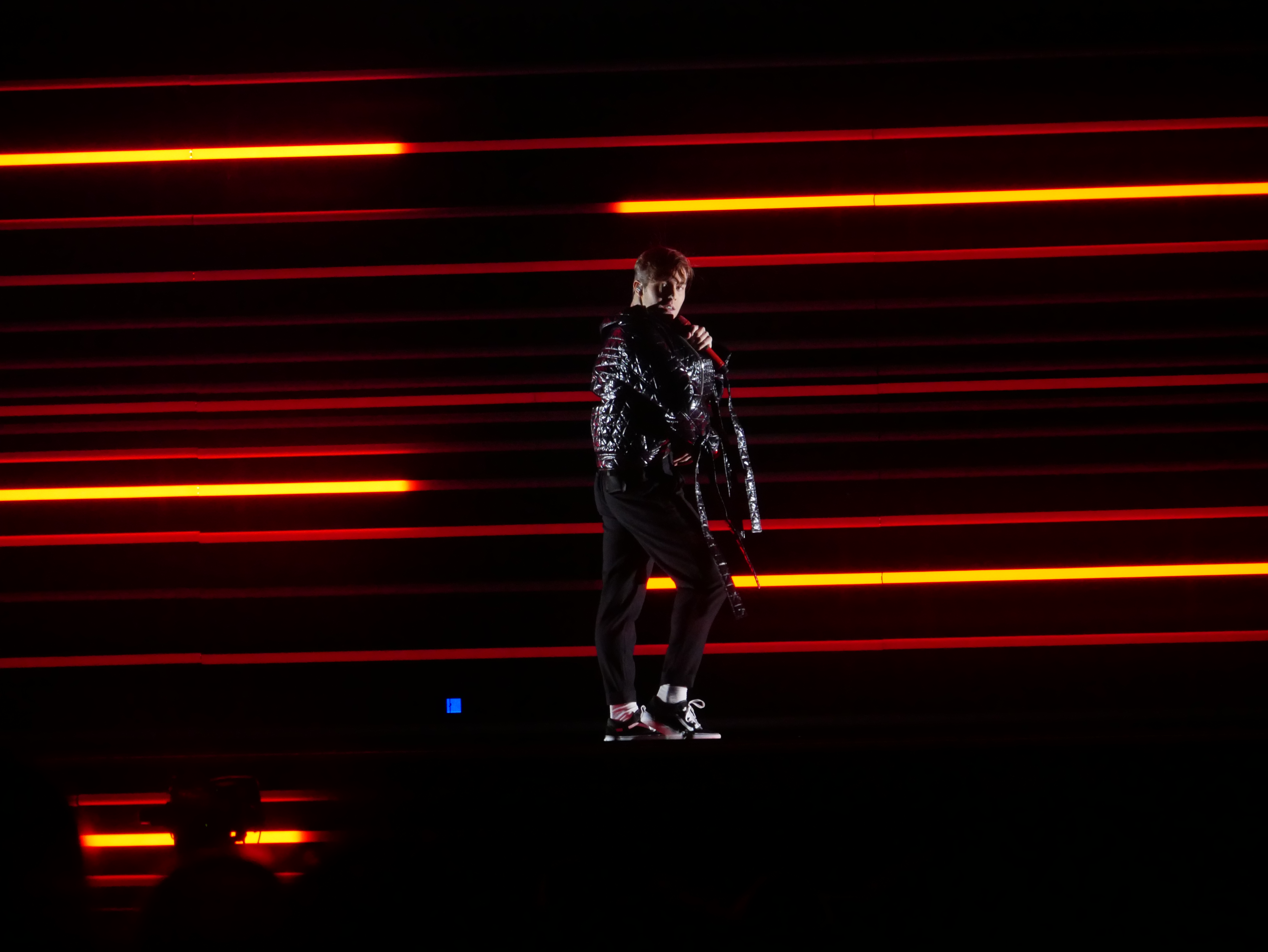
- Ingrosso in 2018
- Studio albums: 5
- EPs: 2
- Live albums: 3
- Singles: 35

Swedish singer and songwriter Benjamin Ingrosso has released five studio albums, three live albums, two extended plays, and 35 singles. He competed twice in Melodifestivalen in 2017 and 2018, winning in the latter and representing Sweden at that year's Eurovision Song Contest with the song "Dance You Off". In September 2018, he released his debut studio album Identification. The album peaked at number one on the Swedish Albums Chart. In January 2021, he released his second studio album and first Swedish-language album En gång i tiden, which also peaked at number one on the Swedish Albums Chart. The follow-up album En gång i tiden (del 2), released in April 2021, also peaked at number one on the Swedish Albums Chart.

== Albums ==
=== Studio albums ===
Title	Details	Peak chart positions		Certifications
Title	Details	SWE	NOR	Certifications
Identification	Released: 28 September 2018; Label: TEN; Formats: CD, digital download, streaming	1	18	GLF: Platinum
En gång i tiden (del 1)	Released: 15 January 2021; Label: TEN; Formats: Digital download, streaming	1	—	GLF: Gold
En gång i tiden (del 2)	Released: 16 April 2021; Label: TEN; Formats: Digital download, streaming	1	—	GLF: Platinum
Playlist	Released: 17 June 2022; Label: TEN; Formats: Digital download, streaming	4	—	
Pink Velvet Theatre	Released: 25 October 2024; Label: EMI, Universal; Formats: LP, digital download, streaming	1	21	GLF: Gold
Baby Don't Say That, I'm Sensitive	Scheduled: 19 March 2027; Label: EMI, Universal; Formats: Digital download, streaming	TBA		

=== Live albums ===
Title	Details	Peak chart positions
Title	Details	SWE
Benjamin's – Låtarna	Released: 6 May 2022; Label: TEN; Formats: Digital download, streaming	—
Live at Konserthuset Stockholm (with the Royal Stockholm Philharmonic Orchestra)	Released: 30 December 2022; Label: TEN; Formats: Digital download, streaming	12
Allt det vackra (Live från Dalhalla)	Released: 8 December 2023; Label: EMI, Universal; Formats: Digital download, streaming	—

=== Compilation albums ===
Title	Details	Peak chart positions
Title	Details	SWE
En gång i tiden	Released: 24 September 2021; Label: TEN; Formats: Digital download, LP	55

== Extended plays ==
Title	Details	Peak chart positions
Title	Details	SWE
Så mycket bättre 2020 – Tolkningarna	Released: 27 November 2020; Label: TEN; Formats: Digital download, streaming	—
Benjamin's – 2023	Released: 8 June 2023; Label: TEN; Formats: Digital download, streaming	31
Apple Music Session: Benjamin Ingrosso	Released: 19 July 2024; Label: EMI Sweden; Formats: Digital download, streaming	—
Mommy's Boy	Released: 16 October 2026; Label: Universal; Formats: Digital download, streaming	20

== Singles ==
=== As lead artist ===
Title	Year	Peak chart positions								Certifications	Album
Title	Year	SWE	FRA	ICE	LAT Air.	NOR	SCO	SPA	UK Down.	Certifications	Album
"Hej Sofia" (Note: "Hej Sofia" is credited to "Benjamin".)	2006	—	—	—	—	—	—	—	—		Non-album singles
"Jag är en astronaut" (Note: "Jag är en astronaut" is credited to "Benjamin".)	2007	2	—	—	—	—	—	—	—	GLF: Gold	Non-album singles
"Fall in Love"	2015	56	—	—	—	—	—	—	—	GLF: Gold	Non-album singles
"Crystal Clear"	2015	—	—	—	—	—	—	—	—		Non-album singles
"Home for Christmas"	2015	—	—	—	—	—	—	—	—		Non-album singles
"Love You Again"	2016	— (Note: "Love You Again" did not enter the Swedish Singles Chart, but peaked at number 16 on the Swedish Heatseeker chart.)	—	—	—	—	—	—	—		Non-album singles
"Good Lovin'"	2017	10	—	—	—	—	—	—	—	GLF: Platinum	Non-album singles
"Do You Think About Me"	2017	87	—	—	—	—	—	—	—	GLF: Gold	Non-album singles
"One More Time"	2017	79	—	—	—	—	—	—	—	GLF: Gold	Non-album singles
"Dance You Off"	2018	2	78	15	—	—	80	69	61	GLF: Platinum	Identification
"Tror du att han bryr sig" (Note: "Tror du att han bryr sig" features on the Deluxe edition of Identification.) (with Felix Sandman)	2018	7	—	—	—	—	—	—	—	GLF: 3× Platinum	Identification
"I Wouldn't Know"	2018	30	—	—	—	—	—	—	—	GLF: Gold	Identification
"Behave"	2018	8	—	—	—	—	—	—	—	GLF: Gold	Identification
"All Night Long (All Night)" (recorded at Spotify)	2019	5	—	—	—	—	—	—	—	GLF: 3× Platinum; IFPI NOR: Gold	Non-album singles
"Happy Thoughts" (with Felix Sandman)	2019	15	—	—	—	—	—	—	—	GLF: Platinum	Non-album singles
"Costa Rica"	2019	17	—	—	—	—	—	—	—	GLF: Platinum	Non-album singles
"The Dirt"	2020	14	—	—	—	—	—	—	—	GLF: Platinum	Non-album singles
"Shampoo"	2020	25	—	—	—	—	—	—	—	GLF: Gold	Non-album singles
"Flickan på min gata"	2021	9	—	—	—	—	—	—	—	GLF: Gold	En gång i tiden (del 1)
"VHS" (with Cherrie)	2021	14	—	—	—	—	—	—	—	GLF: Platinum	En gång i tiden
"Allt det vackra"	2021	6	—	—	—	—	—	—	—	GLF: Platinum	En gång i tiden (del 2)
"Smile"	2021	11	—	—	—	—	—	—	—	GLF: Platinum	Non-album singles
"Not Anybody's Fault"	2021	76	—	—	—	—	—	—	—		Non-album singles
"Sarah"	2021	36	—	—	—	—	—	—	—		En gång i tiden
"En dag när du blir stor"	2021	40	—	—	—	—	—	—	—		Non-album single
"Man on the Moon" (with Alan Walker)	2021	12	—	—	—	23	—	—	—		World of Walker
"Queens"	2022	56	—	—	—	—	—	—	—		Playlist
"Black & Blue" (with Hugel)	2022	— (Note: "Black & Blue" did not enter the Swedish Singellista Chart, but peaked at number 10 on the Swedish Heatseeker Chart.)	—	—	—	—	—	—			Playlist
"Dancing on a Sunny Day"	2022	48	—	—	—	—	—	—	—	GLF: Gold	Playlist
"To Love Somebody" (with Carola)	2023	83	—	—	—	—	—	—	—		Benjamin's – 2023
"I Had It All and Let It Go"	2023	94	—	—	—	—	—	—	—		Benjamin's – 2023
"Kite" (solo or remix with Olly Alexander)	2024	1	—	—	—	—	—	—	—	GLF: Platinum	Pink Velvet Theatre
"Better Days"	2024	7	—	—	—	—	—	—	—	GLF: Gold	Pink Velvet Theatre
"Honey Boy" (with Purple Disco Machine featuring Nile Rodgers and Shenseea)	2024	2	—	—	9	38	—	— (Note: "Honey Boy" did not enter the Spanish Singles Chart, but peaked at number 16 on the Spanish Airplay chart.)	42	GLF: Platinum	Pink Velvet Theatre
"Look Who's Laughing Now"	2024	1	—	38	—	27	—	—	98	GLF: Gold	Pink Velvet Theatre
"All My Life"	2024	3	—	—	—	—	—	—	—		Pink Velvet Theatre
"Back to You"	2024	7	—	—	—	—	—	—	—		Pink Velvet Theatre
"Angela"	2025	13	—	—	—	—	—	—	—		Pink Velvet Theatre
"Funny Feeling"	2026	25	—	—	—	—	—	—	—		Baby Don't Say That, I'm Sensitive
"Waste My Time"	2026	9	—	—	18	—	—	—	—		Baby Don't Say That, I'm Sensitive
"Mommy's Boy"	2026	41	—	—	—	—	—	—	—		Baby Don't Say That, I'm Sensitive
"—" denotes a single that did not chart or was not released in that territory.

=== As featured artist ===
Title	Year	Peak chart positions				Certifications	Album
Title	Year	SWE	BEL (WA)	FRA	POL	Certifications	Album
"Paradise" (Ofenbach featuring Benjamin Ingrosso)	2018	99	8	36	9	SNEP: Gold	Ofenbach
"I Found You" (Vantage featuring Benjamin Ingrosso)	2021	—	—	—	—		Sweet Spot
"Komma över dig" (Petter featuring Benjamin Ingrosso)	2022	23	—	—	—		Hälsa Stockholm
"Som ett minne blott" (Norlie & KKV featuring Benjamin Ingrosso)	2022	13	—	—	—		Non-album single

=== Promotional singles ===
Title	Year	Peak chart positions	Certifications	Album
Title	Year	SWE	Certifications	Album
"Långsamt farväl" (Lisa Nilsson cover)	2020	1	GLF: Platinum	Så Mycket Bättre 2020 – Tolkningarna and En gång i tiden (del 1)
"Tänd alla ljus" (Silvana Imam cover)	2020	6	GLF: Gold	Så Mycket Bättre 2020 – Tolkningarna and En gång i tiden (del 1)
"Only Your Heart" (Lili & Susie cover)	2020	45		Så mycket bättre 2020 – Tolkningarna
"Judy min vän" (Tommy Körberg cover)	2020	8	GLF: Platinum	Så mycket bättre 2020 – Tolkningarna and En gång i tiden (del 2)
"Come Give Me Love" (live at Benjamin's; with First Aid Kit)	2022	60		Benjamin's – Låtarna
"Barnasinnet" (2022)	2022	—		Benjamin's – Låtarna
"Tänd alla ljus" (live at Benjamin's; with Silvana Imam)	2022	— (Note: "Tänd alla ljus" did not enter the Swedish Singellista Chart, but peaked at number 15 on the Swedish Heatseeker Chart.)		Benjamin's – Låtarna
"Till slutet av augusti" (live at Benjamin's; with Moonica Mac)	2022	62		Benjamin's – Låtarna
"Sagan om oss två" (live at Benjamin's; with Sarah Dawn Finer)	2022	—		Benjamin's – Låtarna
"When I First Saw You" (live at Benjamin's; with Daniela Rathana)	2022	—		Benjamin's – Låtarna
"La Incondicional" (live at Benjamin's; with Omar Rudberg)	2022	—		Benjamin's – Låtarna
"Ner från molnen / Ner på jorden / Dance You Off (live version)" (live at Benjamin's; with Markus Krunegård)	2022	—		Benjamin's – Låtarna
"Moviestar" (live at Benjamin's; with Harpo)	2022	—		Benjamin's – Låtarna
"Jag ska fånga en ängel" (live at Benjamin's; with Sara Zacharias)	2022	—		Benjamin's – Låtarna
"Vilja bli" (live at Benjamin's; with Oskar Linnros)	2023	— (Note: "Vilja bli" did not enter the Swedish Singellista Chart, but peaked at number one on the Swedish Heatseeker Chart.)		Benjamin's – 2023
"Shores" (live at Benjamin's; with Seinabo Sey)	2023	— (Note: "Shores" did not enter the Swedish Singellista Chart, but peaked at number 15 on the Swedish Heatseeker Chart.)		Benjamin's – 2023
"Stockholm" (live at Benjamin's; with Jonathan Johansson)	2023	— (Note: "Stockholm" did not enter the Swedish Singellista Chart, but peaked at number 10 on the Swedish Heatseeker Chart.)		Benjamin's – 2023
"Du får göra som du vill" (live at Benjamin's; with Alba August)	2023	67		Benjamin's – 2023

== Other appearances ==
Title	Year	Other artist(s)	Album
"Jag såg mamma kyssa tomten"	2006	Cotton Club & Friends	Christmas Cocktail
"Lägereldarnas/Sagornas tid"	2009	Bo Wastesson, Niklas Andersson	Bröderna Lejonhjärta

== Other charted songs ==
Title	Year	Peak chart positions	Certifications	Album
Title	Year	SWE	Certifications	Album
"I'll Be Fine Somehow"	2018	22	GLF: Platinum; IFPI Norway: Platinum	Identification
"So Good So Fine When You're Messing with My Mind"	2018	29		Identification
"Spotlights"	2018	53		Identification
"Happiness"	2018	82		Identification
"No Sleep"	2018	83		Identification
"Love Songs"	2018	88		Identification
"Good Intentions"	2018	89		Identification
"If This Bed Could Talk"	2018	93		Identification
"All I See Is You"	2018	— (Note: "All I See Is You" did not enter the Swedish Singellista Chart, but peaked at number two on the Swedish Heatseeker Chart.)		Identification
"Fancy"	2019	— (Note: "Fancy" did not enter the Swedish Singellista Chart, but peaked at number one on the Swedish Heatseeker Chart.)		Identification (deluxe)
"1989"	2019	— (Note: "1989" did not enter the Swedish Singellista Chart, but peaked at number three on the Swedish Heatseeker Chart.)		Identification (deluxe)
"Känns som att livet börjar hända"	2021	54		En gång i tiden
"Barnasinnet"	2021	34	GLF: Gold	En gång i tiden
"Vad skulle hända om vi försvann..?"	2021	63		En gång i tiden
"Se men inte röra"	2021	56		En gång i tiden
"Längst inne i mitt huvud"	2021	73		En gång i tiden
"Ouvertyr"	2021	58		En gång i tiden (del 2)
"Det stora röda huset" (featuring Moonica Mac)	2021	9	GLF: Gold	En gång i tiden (del 2)
"I min lägenhet"	2021	25		En gång i tiden (del 2)
"Stockholm"	2021	39		En gång i tiden (del 2)
"En gång i tiden"	2021	50		En gång i tiden (del 2)
"Avslutning"	2021	72		En gång i tiden (del 2)
"Happy Birthday"	2022	— (Note: "Happy Birthday" did not enter the Swedish Singellista Chart, but peaked at number nine on the Swedish Heatseeker Chart.)		Playlist
"Bullet"	2022	21		Playlist
"Dance for Me"	2022	— (Note: "Dance for Me" did not enter the Swedish Singellista Chart, but peaked at number 11 on the Swedish Heatseeker Chart.)		Playlist
"Rewind It"	2022	— (Note: "Rewind It" did not enter the Swedish Singellista Chart, but peaked at number one on the Swedish Heatseeker Chart.)		Playlist
"..And So It Begins"	2024	88		Pink Velvet Theatre
"PVT?"	2024	100		Pink Velvet Theatre
"Iknow Iknow"	2024	67		Pink Velvet Theatre
"Worst in Me"	2024	68		Pink Velvet Theatre
"So This Is Love?"	2024	— (Note: "So This Is Love?" did not enter the Swedish Singellista Chart, but peaked at number one on the Swedish Heatseeker Chart.)		Pink Velvet Theatre

== Songwriting credits ==
Title	Year	Album	Artist(s)
"Jag Vill Ha Dig"	2016	Non-album singles	Kristian Ravelius
"Liberate"	2016	Non-album singles	Molly Hammar
"I Want You"	2016	Non-album singles	Oscar Zia
"Without the Sun" (featuring Luca Perra)	2016	We Are (Part 2)	Dash Berlin
"Waiting for You"	2016	Non-album single	Le Boeuf
"Sleepless"	2016	A Little More	Isac Elliot
"Stay Young"	2016	Chance of Rain	Strandels
"Billion"	2017	Non-album singles	We the Kids
"All They Wann Be" (featuring Caslin)	2018	Non-album singles	Madison Mars
"Words"	2019	Non-album singles	Molly Hammar
"On My Own"	2019	Non-album singles	Bishara
"Perfect Crime" (featuring Daniel Gidlund)	2019	Non-album singles	Nause
"Bye My First..."	2019	We Boom	NCT Dream
"Body Talkin'"	2019	Let's Goal!: Barairo no Jinsei	Mai Kuraki
"Baby You Are"	2019	Obsession	Exo
"You Calling My Name"	2019	Call My Name	GOT7
"2 in a Million" (featuring Sting, SHAED)	2019	Neon Future IV	Steve Aoki
"Utan Dig"	2019	TBA	Pernilla Wahlgren
"R U 4 Real?"	2020	TBA	Bishara
"Get to Know Me First"	2020	TBA	Molly Hammar, Julie Bergan and AWA
"Born with It" (featuring Sam Martin)	2020	TBA	Enzo Ingrosso
