= List of Benjamin Ingrosso concert tours =

The following is a list of concert tours that American actress and singer Hilary Duff has embarked on during her professional career.

== BxF Tour ==
BxF Tour
- Tour by Benjamin Ingrosso & Felix Sandman
- Location: Europe
- Associated album: Identification; Emotions
- Start date: October 6, 2018
- End date: May 16, 2019
- Legs: 1
- No. of shows: 19

Benjamin Ingrosso & Felix Sandman concert chronology
- BxF Tour (2018-2019); Club Tour (2019)

The BxF Tour (or Tour 2018) was the debut concert tour by Swedish pop singers Benjamin Ingrosso and Felix Sandman. The tour supported both of their first studio albums, Ingrosso's Identification (2018) and Sandman's Emotions (2018).

=== Set list ===
Benjamin Ingrosso

This set list is representative of the songs Ingrosso performed in Norrköping on October 6, 2018.

1. "Dance You Off"
2. "Spotlights"
3. "Good Intentions"
4. "Love Songs"
5. "All I See is You"
6. "Good Lovin'"
7. "If This Bed Could Talk"
8. "I Wouldn't Know"
9. "Fall in Love"
10. "I'll Be Fine Somehow"
11. "Behave"
12. "So Good So Fine When You're Messing With My Mind"

Encore

13. "Tror du att han bryr sig" (with Felix Sandman)
Felix Sandman

This set list is representative of the songs Sandman performed in Örebro on October 12, 2018.

1. "Imprint"
2. "0 Emotions"
3. "Trouble"
4. "Lovisa"
5. "Summer Love" / "Build a Girl"
6. "Everything Is Great"
7. "Part of Me"
8. "Human"
9. "Tone It Down"
10. "Are You?"
11. "Hands On You"
12. "Every Single Day"

Encore

13. "Tror du att han bryr sig" (with Benjamin Ingrosso)

=== Tour dates ===
List of concerts
Date	City	Country	Venue
6 October	Norrköping	Sweden	Louis De Geer Concert & Congress
7 October	Karlstad	Sweden	Karlstad CCC
12 October	Örebro	Sweden	Conventum Arena
13 October	Gothenburg	Sweden	Gothenburg Concert Hall
14 October	Halmstad	Sweden	Halmstads Teater
19 October	Luleå	Sweden	Kulturens Hus
20 October	Gävle	Sweden	Gävle Konserthus
21 October	Västeras	Sweden	Västeras Konserthus
26 October	Eskilstuna	Sweden	Lokomotivet
28 October	Linköping	Sweden	Linköping Konsert & Kongress
2 November	Karlskrona	Sweden	Karlskrona Konserthusteater
3 November	Jönköping	Sweden	Jönköping Concert Hall
10 November	Uppsala	Sweden	Uppsala Konsert & Kongress
11 November	Sundsvall	Sweden	Tonhallen
23 November	Vara	Sweden	Vara Concert Hall
24 November	Helsingborg	Sweden	Helsingborg Arena
4 December	Malmö	Sweden	Malmö Live
12 December	Stockholm	Sweden	Cirkus
16 May 2019	Stockholm	Sweden	Gröna Lund

Cancelled shows
Date	City	Country	Venue	Reason
18 November	Kalmar	Sweden	Kalmarsalen	Undisclosed

== Club Tour ==
Club Tour
- Tour by Benjamin Ingrosso
- Location: Europe
- Associated album: Identification (Deluxe)
- Start date: March 29, 2019
- End date: April 20, 2019
- Legs: 1
- No. of shows: 5

Benjamin Ingrosso concert chronology
- BxF Tour (2018-2019); Club Tour (2018-2019); Scandinavian Tour (2019)

The Club Tour was the second concert tour by Swedish pop singer Benjamin Ingrosso. The tour supported Ingrosso's album Identification (2018).

=== Set list ===
This set list is representative of the songs Ingrosso performed in Örebro on March 29, 2019.

1. "Paradise"
2. "Tror du att han bryr sig"
3. "I'll Be Fine Somehow"
4. "So Good So Fine When You're Messing With My Mind"
5. "I Wouldn't Know"
6. "1989"
7. "All I See is You"
8. "Fancy"
9. "Behave"
10. "Dance You Off"

Encore

11. "All Night Long (All Night)"

=== Tour dates ===
List of concerts
Date	City	Country	Venue
29 March	Örebro	Sweden	Ritz
30 March	Falun	Sweden	Falu Bowling & Krog
12 April	Norrköping	Sweden	Arbis Bar & Salonger
13 April	Gothenburg	Sweden	Trädgår'n
20 April	Åre	Sweden	Bygget

== Scandinavian Tour ==
Scandinavian Tour
- Tour by Benjamin Ingrosso
- Location: Europe
- Associated album: Identification (Deluxe)
- Start date: October 6, 2019
- End date: October 19, 2019
- Legs: 1
- No. of shows: 6

Benjamin Ingrosso concert chronology
- Club Tour (2019); Scandinavian Tour (2019); Allt Det Vackra Summer Tour (2023)

The Scandinavian Tour was the third concert tour by Swedish pop singer Benjamin Ingrosso. The tour supported Ingrosso's studio album Identification (2018). It was the singer's first tour to go outside of Sweden.

=== Set list ===
This set list is representative of the songs Ingrosso performed in Stockholm on November 16, 2019.

1. "So Good So Fine When You're Messing With My Mind"
2. "I Wouldn't Know"
3. "Spotlights"
4. "Love Songs"
5. "1989"
6. "Fancy"
7. "All I See is You"
8. "Paradise"
9. "Costa Rica"
10. "I'll Be Fine Somehow"
11. "Behave"
12. "Dance You Off"
13. "Tror du att han bryr sig"

Encore

14. "All Night Long (All Night)"
Notes
- Ingrosso performed the unreleased song "Finally Alright" on November 8.
- "The Dirt" was performed on November 8 and 16.

=== Tour dates ===
List of concerts
Date	City	Country	Venue
3 November	Copenhagen	Denmark	Vega
8 November	Aarhus	Denmark	Train
9 November	Bergen	Norway	Studio USF
10 November	Oslo	Norway	Parkteatret
16 November	Stockholm	Sweden	Berns Salonger
29 November	Vasa	Finland	Fontana Club

== Allt Det Vackra Summer Tour ==
Allt Det Vackra Summer Tour
- Tour by Benjamin Ingrosso
- Location: Europe
- Associated album: En gång i tiden; En gång i tiden (del 2); Playlist
- Start date: October 6, 2019
- End date: October 19, 2019
- Legs: 1
- No. of shows: 22

Benjamin Ingrosso concert chronology
- Scandinavian Tour (2019); Allt Det Vackra Summer Tour (2023); Better Days Tour (2024)

The Allt Det Vackra Summer Tour was the fourth concert tour and first festival tour by Swedish pop singer Benjamin Ingrosso. The tour supported Ingrosso's second and third studio albums, En gång i tiden and En gång i tiden (del 2) (2021).

=== Set list ===
This set list is representative of the songs Ingrosso performed in Umeå on June 2, 2023.

1. "Honey Boy"
2. "Dancing on a Sunny Day"
3. "Tror du att han bryr sig"
4. "I min lägenhet"
5. "Se men inte röra"
6. "Heart of Glass" / "Dance You Off"
7. "Allt det vackra"
8. "Långsamt farväl"
9. "Barnasinnet"
10. "Smile"
11. "Queens"
12. "Tänd alla ljus" (Silvana Imam cover)

Encore

13. "All Night Long (All Night)"

=== Tour dates ===
List of concerts
Date	City	Country	Venue/Festival
2 June	Umeå	Sweden	Brännbollsyran
9 June	Trondheim	Norway	Neon Festival
10 June	Gothenburg	Sweden	Liseberg
28 June	Motala	Sweden	Lokverkstan
30 June	Kiruna	Sweden	Kirunafestivalen
1 July	Skellefteå	Sweden	Summertime Music & Life Festival
2 July	High Coast	Sweden	Naturscen Skuleberget
8 July	Oskarshamn	Sweden	Latitud 57
12 July	Tønsberg	Norway	Slottsfjell
14 July	Helsingborg	Sweden	Helsingborg Bayside Festival
15 July	Borås	Sweden	Bruket i Wiared
25 July	Fårö	Sweden	Sommarkväll på Gåsemora
26 July	Fårö	Sweden	Sommarkväll på Gåsemora
28 July	Östersund	Sweden	Storsjöyran
29 July	Norrköping	Sweden	Hugo Parkfestival
1 August	Tylösand	Sweden	Hotel Tylösand
2 August	Tylösand	Sweden	Hotel Tylösand
3 August	Borgholm	Sweden	Borgholm Castle
4 August	Karlskrona	Sweden	Karlskrona Skärgårdsfest
5 August	Arvika	Sweden	Arvika Hamnfest
11 August	Rättvik	Sweden	Dalhalla
12 August	Stockholm	Sweden	Skansen
18 August	Örebro	Sweden	Gustavsvik
19 August	Lidköping	Sweden	Läckö Castle
1 September	Borås	Sweden	Åhaga
2 September	Huskvarna	Sweden	Folkets Park
9 September	Linköping	Sweden	Bonfire Festival Linköping
15 September	Stockholm	Sweden	Stora Scenen

== Better Days Tour ==
Better Days Tour
- Tour by Benjamin Ingrosso
- Location: Europe
- Associated album: Pink Velvet Theatre
- Start date: April 1, 2024
- End date: August 17, 2024
- Legs: 1
- No. of shows: 29

Benjamin Ingrosso concert chronology
- Allt Det Vackra Summer Tour (2023); Better Days Tour (2024); Pink Velvet Theatre Tour (2025)

The Better Days Tour was the fifth concert tour by Swedish pop singer Benjamin Ingrosso. The tour supported Ingrosso's fourth studio album, Pink Velvet Theatre (2024).

=== Set list ===
This set list is representative of the songs Ingrosso performed in Berlin on April 9, 2024.

1. "Look Who's Laughing Now"
2. "Tror du att han bryr sig"
3. "Honey Boy"
4. "Angela"
5. "I'll Be Fine Somehow"
6. "The Greatest" (Unreleased song)
7. "All My Life"
8. "Worst in Me"
9. "Afterlife"
10. "Smile"
11. "OMG" (Unreleased song)
12. "Back to You"
13. "Tänd alla ljus" (Silvana Imam cover)
14. "Better Days"

Encore

15. "Kite"

=== Tour dates ===
List of concerts
Date	City	Country	Venue/Festival
1 April	Hamburg	Germany	Khust
2 April	Amsterdam	Netherlands	Melkweg
4 April	London	United Kingdom	Heaven
5 April	Paris	France	Les Étoiles
6 April	Cologne	Germany	CBE
8 April	Munich	Germany	Kranhalle
9 April	Berlin	Germany	Hole 44
10 April	Copenhagen	Denmark	Amager Bio
12 April	Oslo	Norway	Sentrum Scene
13 April	Oslo	Norway	Sentrum Scene
17 April	Milan	Italy	Magnolia
18 April	Madrid	Spain	Chango
23 April	Helsinki	Finland	Tavastia Club
8 June	Stavanger	Norway	Vaulen Festival
22 June	Fredrikstad	Norway	Idyll Festivalen
28 June	Odense	Denmark	Tinderbox
6 July	Kristiansand	Norway	Palmesus Festival
18 July	Helsingborg	Sweden	Sofiero Palace
19 July	Halmstad	Sweden	Brottet
20 July	Lysekil	Sweden	Pinneviken
24 July	Malmö	Sweden	Tallriken
26 July	Karlstad	Sweden	Mariebergsskogen
27 July	Gävle	Sweden	Gasklockorna
2 August	Kalmar	Sweden	Fredriksskans
3 August	Linköping	Sweden	Stangebrofaltet
9 August	Stockholm	Sweden	Stockholm Olympic Stadium
10 August	Gothenburg	Sweden	Way Out West
16 August	Jakobstad	Finland	Skalparken
17 August	Raseborg	Finland	Raseborg Festival

== Pink Velvet Theatre Tour ==
Pink Velvet Theatre Tour
- Tour by Benjamin Ingrosso
- Location: North America
- Associated album: Pink Velvet Theatre
- Start date: February 7, 2025
- End date: February 19, 2025
- Legs: 1
- No. of shows: 7

Benjamin Ingrosso concert chronology
- Better Days Tour (2024); Pink Velvet Theatre Tour (2025); EU Tour (2025)

The Pink Velvet Theatre Tour was the sixth concert tour by Swedish pop singer Benjamin Ingrosso. The tour supported Ingrosso's fourth studio album, Pink Velvet Theatre (2024). It was the singer's first tour in North America.

=== Set list ===
This set list is representative of the songs Ingrosso performed in Chicago on February 7, 2025.

1. "All My Life"
2. "Look Who's Laughing Now"
3. "Angela"
4. "Worst in Me"
5. "Iknow, Iknow"
6. "Lips" (Unreleased song)
7. "Only For You" (Unreleased song)
8. "Crazy Stupid Love" (Unreleased song)
9. "Better Days"
10. "All the stars"
11. "Back to You"
12. "Honey Boy"
13. "Kite"

Encore

14. "Roses in the Desert" (Unreleased song)

=== Tour dates ===
List of concerts
Date	City	Country	Venue
7 February	Chicago	United States	House of Blues
9 February	Toronto	Canada	The Axis Club Theatre
12 February	Boston	United States	Big Night Live
14 February	New York City	United States	Irving Plaza
15 February	Philadelphia	United States	Theatre of Living Arts
16 February	Silver Spring, MD	United States	The Fillmore Silver Spring
19 February	Los Angeles	United States	Echoplex

== EU Tour ==
EU Tour
- Tour by Benjamin Ingrosso
- Location: Europe
- Associated album: Full discography
- Start date: June 6, 2025
- End date: August 9, 2025
- Legs: 1
- No. of shows: 9

Benjamin Ingrosso concert chronology
- Pink Velvet Theatre Tour (2025); EU Tour (2025); What Happens Next? Tour (2026)

The EU Tour was the seventh concert tour and second festival tour by Swedish pop singer Benjamin Ingrosso. The tour supported Ingrosso's discography, containing multiple songs from all of the singer's studio albums.

=== Set list ===
This set list is only representative of the songs Ingrosso performed in Paris on July 18, 2025.

1. "Tror du att han bryr sig"
2. "Barnasinnet"
3. "Look Who's Laughing Now"
4. "Happiness"
5. "Tänd alla ljus" (Silvana Imam cover)
6. "All My Life"
7. "Dancing on a Sunny Day"
8. "So Good So Fine When You're Messing with My Mind"
9. "Honey Boy"
10. "Kite"
11. "Smile"
12. "I'll Be Fine Somehow"
13. "Allt det vackra"
14. "Better Days"

Encore

15. "Det stora röda huset"

=== Tour dates ===
List of concerts
Date	City	Country	Venue/Festival
6 June	Trondheim	Norway	Neon
13 June	Bergen	Norway	Bergenfest
14 June	Oslo	Norway	VG Lista
22 June	Landgraaf	Netherlands	Pinkpop
4 July	Turku	Finland	Ruisrock
10 July	Tønsberg	Norway	Slotsfjell
12 July	Berlin	Germany	Lollapalooza Berlin
18 July	Paris	France	Lollapalooza Paris
9 August	Skanderborg	Denmark	Smukfest

== What Happens Next? Tour ==
What Happens Next? Tour
- Tour by Benjamin Ingrosso
- Location: Europe
- Associated album: Baby Don't Say That, I'm Sensitive
- Start date: October 23, 2026
- End date: November 14, 2026
- Legs: 1
- No. of shows: 11

Benjamin Ingrosso concert chronology
- EU Tour (2025); What Happens Next? Tour (2026)

The What Happens Next? Tour is the eighth concert tour by Swedish pop singer Benjamin Ingrosso. The tour is in support of Ingrosso's sixth studio album, Baby Don't Say That, I'm Sensitive.

=== Set list ===
This set list is representative of the songs Ingrosso performed in Karlstad on October 23, 2026.

1. "Nice to Meet Ya"
2. "Angela"
3. "Barnasinnet"
4. "End of the World"
5. "Funny Feeling"
6. "All My Life"
7. "Smile"
8. "Cliché"
9. "Det stora röda huset"
10. "Allt det vackra"
11. "Waste My Time"
12. "Kite"
13. "What Girls Want"
14. "Walk Out of Heaven"
15. "Mommy's Boy"
16. "Better Days"
17. "Worst in Me"
18. "Look Who's Laughing Now"
19. "Honey Boy"

Encore

20. "Deep Diver"

=== Tour dates ===
List of concerts
Date	City	Country	Venue
October 23	Karlstad	Sweden	Löfbergs Arena
October 24	Gothenburg	Sweden	Scandinavium
October 25	Gothenburg	Sweden	Scandinavium
October 28	Helsinki	Finland	Veikkaus Arena
October 30	Malmö	Sweden	Malmö Arena
October 31	Linköping	Sweden	Saab Arena
November 5	Oslo	Norway	Oslo Spektrum
November 6	Sandviken	Sweden	Göransson Arena
November 7	Sundsvall	Sweden	Gärdehov
November 13	Stockholm	Sweden	Avicii Arena
November 14	Stockholm	Sweden	Avicii Arena
