= Live at Konserthuset Stockholm =

2022 live album by Benjamin Ingrosso

Live album by Benjamin Ingrosso featuring the Royal Stockholm Philharmonic Orchestra
- Released: 30 December 2022
- Recorded: September 2022
- Length: 51:01
- Language: Swedish / English
- Label: TEN Music

Benjamin Ingrosso albums chronology
Playlist (2022)	Live at Konserthuset Stockholm (2022)	Benjamin's – 2023 (2023)

Live at Konserthuset Stockholm is a live album by Swedish singer Benjamin Ingrosso featuring the Royal Stockholm Philharmonic Orchestra. The album was recorded during the September 2022 performance and released on 30 December 2022 by TEN Music Group following a broadcast on TV4. The album debuted at number 12 on the Swedish album chart.

About the performance, Ingrosso said "It's a dream to make music with an orchestra like the Royal Stockholm Philharmonic Orchestra. I want to offer something extra, in which my own music becomes 'classic' and reminiscent of great pieces that have inspired me throughout my life."

== Critical reception ==
Scandipop called the album "a top-tier way to spend a relaxing hour immersed in the rarely explored sounds of when Swedish pop meets classical music." Scandipop called "I’ll Be Fine Somehow" as the album highlight concluding their review saying "As a whole album though, it serves as further proof, were it ever needed, that Benjamin Ingrosso really is the ultimate showman in Sweden right now, and likely for decades to come."

== Track listing ==
Live at Konserthuset Stockholm track listing
No.	Title	Writer(s)	Length
1.	"Ouverture"	Benjamin Ingrosso; Sebastian Atas; Gustav Jonsson; Hampus Lindvall; Andreas Roos; Niclas Wahlgren	1:39
2.	"Känns som att livet börjar hända"	Ingrosso; Aron Bergerwall; Tobias Bergerwall; Wilhelm Börjesson	3:38
3.	"Smile"	Ingrosso; Britt Burton; Lindvall	3:43
4.	"Barnasinnet"	Ingrosso; Atas	3:25
5.	"Taranto"	Ingrosso	2:40
6.	"I'll Be Fine Somehow"	Ingrosso; Axident; Mozella	4:40
7.	"Det stora röda huset"	Ingrosso; Lisa Brolander; Lindvall	3:16
8.	"Flickan på min gata"	Ingrosso; Wahlgren	3:08
9.	"Hur Kan Något sä fint bli sä Fult?"	Ingrosso; Wahlgren	4:17
10.	"Un Songo" / "En Dröm"	Ingrosso; Per Ekdahl	3:08
11.	"Stockholm"	Ingrosso; Jonsson; Roos	3:42
12.	"Judy min vän" (with Tommy Körberg)	Britt Lindeborg; Roger Wallis	4:30
13.	"Dancing on a Sunny Day"	Ingrosso; Petter Alfredsson; A. Bergerwall; William Forsling; Koda; Lindberg; Markus Sepehrmanesh	3:13
14.	"Allt det vackra"	Ingrosso; Wahlgren	5:00
15.	"Epilog"	Ingrosso; A. Bergerwall; T. Bergerwall; Borjesson	0:51
Total length:			51:05

== Charts ==
Weekly chart performance for Live at Konserthuset Stockholm
Chart (2023)	Peak position
Swedish Albums (Sverigetopplistan)	12
