= Happy Thoughts (song) =

Single by Benjamin Ingrosso and Felix Sandman
- Released: 10 May 2019
- Length: 2:45
- Label: TEN; Artist House
- Songwriter(s): Benjamin Ingrosso; Felix Sandman; Noah Conrad; Parker James; Rollo Spreckley
- Producer(s): Noah Conrad

Benjamin Ingrosso singles chronology
"All Night Long (All Night)" (2019)	"Happy Thoughts" (2019)	"Costa Rica" (2019)

Felix Sandman singles chronology
"Something Right" (2019)	"Happy Thoughts" (2019)	"Middle of Nowhere" (2019)

Music video
- "Happy Thoughts" on YouTube

"Happy Thoughts" is a song by Swedish singers Benjamin Ingrosso and Felix Sandman, released as a single on 10 May 2019 through TEN Music Group and Artist House. It is their second collaboration, following the release of "Tror du att han bryr sig" in May 2018. A music video co-directed by the pair with Robin Kadir was released for the track on 12 May 2019. "Happy Thoughts" was certified gold in Sweden in August 2019.

== Background ==
Ingrosso said the pair wrote the song about both of their exes when they were both going through "the stage you hear in the song". He also called it a "more chill" pop song and "completely different" to his and Sandman's previous collaboration "Tror du att han bryr sig".

== Critical reception ==
Anders Nunstedt of Expressen said the song begins as if it were "entirely Ingrosso's. But when Sandman steps into the electronically soulful sound image, something happens." Nunstedt complimented the duo's chemistry and said they should "come up with a band name for their side project" and take their production "further".

== Charts ==
Chart (2019)	Peak position
Sweden (Sverigetopplistan)	15

== Certifications ==
Region	Certification	Certified units/sales
Sweden (GLF)	Platinum	8,000,000^{†}
^{†} Streaming-only figures based on certification alone.
