= On My Own (Bishara song) =

Single by Bishara
- Released: February 23, 2019
- Genre: Pop
- Label: TEN
- Songwriter(s): Benjamin Ingrosso; Robert "Deadbeat" Habolin; Marcus "Mack" Sepehrmanesh
- Producer(s): Deadbeat; Mack

"On My Own" is a song by Syrian-Swedish singer Bishara. The song was performed for the first time in Melodifestivalen 2019, where it made it to the finale. The song peaked at number four on the Swedish Singles Chart and subsequently placed at number 100 on the Swedish Year-end Singles Chart. It was also certified platinum in Sweden.

== Charts ==
=== Weekly charts ===
Chart (2019)	Peak position	Certification
Sweden (Sverigetopplistan)	4	GLF: Platinum

=== Year-end charts ===
Chart (2019)	Position
Sweden (Sverigetopplistan)	100

== Certifications ==
Region	Certification	Certified units/sales
Sweden (GLF)	Platinum	8,000,000^{†}
^{†} Streaming-only figures based on certification alone.
