= Shampoo (Benjamin Ingrosso song) =

Single by Benjamin Ingrosso
- Released: 12 June 2020
- Genre: Pop
- Length: 2:58
- Label: TEN
- Songwriters: Aron Bergerwall; Benjamin Ingrosso; Mack
- Producer: Aron WyMe

Benjamin Ingrosso singles chronology
"The Dirt" (2020)	"Shampoo" (2020)	"Flickan på min gata" (2021)

Music video
- "Shampoo" on YouTube

"Shampoo" is a song by Swedish singer Benjamin Ingrosso. It was released as a single on 12 June 2020 by TEN Music Group. The song peaked at number 25 on the Sverigetopplistan.

== Critical reception ==
Jonathan Vautrey from Wiwibloggs said, "Sonically, the track is percussion-driven and has a wonderful casual-summer vibe to it. The last third of the song is mainly an instrument breakdown, with the trumpets adding an extra Latin-jazz flavour to the track."

== Track listing ==
Digital download
No.	Title	Length
1.	"Shampoo"	2:58

Alternative Versions EP
No.	Title	Length
1.	"Shampoo" (acoustic)	2:30
2.	"Shampoo" (Nause and Middle Milk remix)	2:44
3.	"Shampoo" (Eric Atlas remix)	2:41
4.	"Shampoo" (Trilane remix)	2:48

== Personnel ==
Credits adapted from Tidal.

- Aron Bergerwall – composer, lyricist, mixer, producer
- Benjamin Ingrosso – composer, lyricist
- Mack – composer, lyricist
- Martin Ankelius – engineer

== Charts ==
Chart (2020)	Peak position
Sweden (Sverigetopplistan)	25

== Certifications ==
Region	Certification	Certified units/sales
Sweden (GLF)	Gold	4,000,000^{†}
^{†} Streaming-only figures based on certification alone.
