= One More Time (Benjamin Ingrosso song) =

Single by Benjamin Ingrosso
- Released: 18 August 2017
- Recorded: 2016
- Genre: Pop
- Length: 3:02
- Label: TEN
- Songwriter(s): Benjamin Ingrosso; Hampus Lindval; Jasmine Anderson

Benjamin Ingrosso singles chronology
| "Do You Think About Me" (2017) | "One More Time" (2017) | "Dance You Off" (2018) |

"One More Time" is a song recorded by Swedish singer Benjamin Ingrosso. The song was released as a digital download in Sweden on 18 August 2017, peaked at number 79 on the Swedish Singles Chart and was certified gold in 2018.

== Music video ==
A music video to accompany the release of "One More Time" was first released onto YouTube on 18 August 2017 at a total length of three minutes and eleven seconds.

== Track listing ==
Digital download
| No. | Title | Length |
|---|---|---|
| 1. | "One More Time" | 3:02 |

== Chart performance ==
=== Weekly charts ===
| Chart (2017) | Peak position |
|---|---|
| Sweden (Sverigetopplistan) | 79 |

== Certifications ==
| Region | Certification | Certified units/sales |
|---|---|---|
| Sweden (GLF) | Gold | 4,000,000^{†} |
^{†} Streaming-only figures based on certification alone.

== Release history ==
| Region | Date | Format | Label |
|---|---|---|---|
| Sweden | 18 August 2017 | Digital download | TEN |
