= Costa Rica (disambiguation) =

Costa Rica, officially the Republic of Costa Rica, is a sovereign state in Central America.

Costa Rica may also refer to:

== Places ==
- Costa Rica, Sinaloa, a town south of Culiacán in Sinaloa, Mexico
- Costa Rica, Mato Grosso do Sul, a municipality located in the Brazilian state of Mato Grosso do Sul
- Costa Rica (El Salvador, Cuba), a locality in El Salvador, Cuba

== Ships ==
- SS Costa Rica, built in 1910 as Prinses Juliana, renamed Costa Rica in 1930, and sunk in 1941
- SS Costa Rica Victory, built in 1944, renamed Groote Beer in 1947, and scrapped in 1971

== Others ==
- "Costa Rica" (Dreamville, Bas and JID song), a 2019 song by Dreamville, from the album Revenge of the Dreamers III
- "Costa Rica" (Benjamin Ingrosso song), a 2019 song by Benjamin Ingrosso
- "Costa Rica", a 2020 song by Bankrol Hayden
