= All Night Long (All Night) =

1983 single by Lionel Richie

- 7" cover

Single by Lionel Richie

from the album Can't Slow Down
- B-side: "Wandering Stranger"
- Released: August 31, 1983
- Genre: Reggae; calypso; pop; dance-pop
- Length: 4:20 (radio version); 6:25 (album version); 3:49 (video version)
- Label: Motown
- Songwriter: Lionel Richie
- Producers: Lionel Richie; James Anthony Carmichael

Lionel Richie singles chronology
"My Love" (1983)	"All Night Long (All Night)" (1983)	"Running with the Night" (1983)

Music video
- "All Night Long (All Night)" on YouTube

"All Night Long (All Night)" is a song by American singer and songwriter Lionel Richie from his second solo album, Can't Slow Down (1983). The song combined Richie's Commodores style with Caribbean influences. The single reached number one on three Billboard charts (pop, R&B and adult contemporary). In the UK, it peaked at number two on the singles chart.

The song lyrics were written primarily in English, but Richie has admitted in at least one press interview that "African" lyrics in the song, such as "Tam bo li de say de moi ya" and "Jambo jumbo", were in fact gibberish. Richie has described these portions of the song as a "wonderful joke", written when he discovered that he lacked the time to hire a translator to contribute the foreign-language lyrics he wished to include in the song.

== Production ==
When composing the song, Richie was able to write all of the verses easily but got stuck when he got up to the hook. He told GQ that he kept repeating, "come on and sing along" over and over to no avail:

Now I have this song, 'Well, my friends the time has come to raise the roof and have some fun,' that's great. 'Karamu, fiesta, forever — come on and sing along. Da-da-da-da…' I don’t have a hook. And so, it took me probably another month of just walking around my house and everywhere trying to find out what is the hook to 'come on and sing along?' I’ve got to give you the sing-along.

Finally, inspiration struck him while he was visiting a friend's house and about to go back to work in the studio:

So, I went to one of my dear friends' houses, Dr. Lloyd Greg, and I went by for dinner. He’s from Jamaica. And I’m leaving at now it's — I took a break from the studio, I'm leaving his house now about two o'clock in the morning. And as I'm leaving the house, I’m saying to him, "Hey man, I got to go back and work all night long, man." All night long. All night long. All night long. All night long. Got it.

== Reception ==
Cash Box summed up its review of the single saying "Richie's command of these diverse musical elements and shifts in melodic direction is as impressive as it is pleasurable." Mat Snow of NME said it "is amongst the most justly infectious floor-fillers ever."

== Music video ==
An accompanying music video for "All Night Long (All Night)" was produced by former Monkee and TV video pioneer Michael Nesmith and directed by Bob Rafelson.

== Notable uses ==
Richie performed the song at the closing ceremonies of the 1984 Summer Olympics in Los Angeles.In 2000, Richie performed the song with British pop band Steps during their promotional tour for BBC.

Richie performed the song live at the December 11, 2006 Nobel Peace Prize concert in Oslo.

In 2024, the song was featured in advertisements for Mattress Firm.

== Charts ==
=== Weekly charts ===
Chart (1983–1984)	Peak position
Argentina (CAPIF)	3
Australia (Kent Music Report)	1
Austria (Ö3 Austria Top 40)	8
Belgium (Ultratop 50 Flanders)	1
Brazil (ABPD)	1
Canada Retail Singles (The Record)	2
Canada Top Singles (RPM)	1
Canada Adult Contemporary (RPM)	1
Finland (Suomen virallinen lista)	1
Netherlands (Dutch Top 40)	1
Netherlands (Single Top 100)	1
New Zealand (Recorded Music NZ)	4
Norway (VG-lista)	3
Peru (UPI)	2
South Africa (Springbok Radio)	1
Sweden (Sverigetopplistan)	8
Switzerland (Schweizer Hitparade)	8
UK Singles (OCC)	2
US Billboard Hot 100	1
US Adult Contemporary (Billboard)	1
US Dance Club Songs (Billboard)	5
US Hot Black Singles (Billboard)	1
US Cash Box Top 100	1
Venezuela (UPI)	1
West Germany (GfK)	2

=== Year-end charts ===
Chart (1983)	Rank
Australia (Kent Music Report)	87
Canada	18
South Africa	6
UK	10
US (Joel Whitburn's Pop Annual)	5
US Cash Box Top 100	6

Chart (1984)	Rank
Australia (Kent Music Report)	23
Brazil (ABPD)	19
US Billboard Hot 100	12

=== All-time charts ===
Chart (1958–2018)	Position
US Billboard Hot 100	96

== Certifications ==
Region	Certification	Certified units/sales
Canada (Music Canada)	Platinum	100,000^{^}
Germany (BVMI)	Gold	300,000^{‡}
Italy (FIMI)	Gold	25,000^{‡}
New Zealand (RMNZ)	3× Platinum	90,000^{‡}
Spain (Promusicae)	Gold	30,000^{‡}
United Kingdom (BPI)	2× Platinum	1,200,000^{‡}
United States (RIAA)	Gold	1,000,000^{^}
^{^} Shipments figures based on certification alone.^{‡} Sales+streaming figures based on certification alone.

== Personnel ==
Personnel as listed in the album's liner notes are:

- Lionel Richie – lead and backing vocals, Yamaha GS-1 synthesizer, rhythm and vocal arrangements
- Greg Phillinganes – Yamaha GS-1 synthesizer
- Darrell Jones – guitar
- Carlos Rios – guitar
- Tim May – guitar
- Abraham Laboriel – bass guitar
- John "J.R." Robinson – drums
- Paulinho da Costa – percussion
- Melinda Chatman – vocal sound effects
- James Anthony Carmichael – backing vocals; horn, rhythm and string arrangements
- David Cochrane – backing vocals
- Calvin Harris – backing vocals
- Richard Marx – backing vocals
- Deborah Thomas – backing vocals
- Kin Vassy – backing vocals

Chant vocals

- Diane Burt, James Anthony Carmichael, Melinda Chatman, David Cochrane, Dr. Lloyd Byro Greig, Calvin Harris, Brenda Harvey-Richie, Jeanette Hawes, Janice-Marie Johnson, Richard Marx, Deborah Joyce Richie, Lionel Richie, Suzanne Stanford and Deborah Thomas

Hoopa hollers

- Marilyn Ammons, Sue Ann Butler, Melinda Chatman, Sheldon J. Cohn, Esq., Sandy Dent-Crimmel, Ruth Diaz, David Egerton, Sylvia Genauer, Rejauna Lynn Green, Gabrielle Greig, Sally Greig, Tanya Greig, Darrell Jones, David Malvin, Alison Maxwell, Jerry Montes, John Michael Montes, Billy Bass Nelson, Greg Phillinganes, Carlos Rios, Suzanne Stanford, Randy Stern, Wilbert Terrell and Susan Wood

Production

- Lionel Richie – producer
- James Anthony Carmichael – producer
- Calvin Harris – recording engineer
- Steve Crimmel – second recording engineer
- David Egerton – second recording engineer, gibberish vocals
- Mark Ettel – second recording engineer

== 2011 version (with Guy Sebastian) ==
"All Night Long (All Night)"

Single by Lionel Richie featuring Guy Sebastian
- Released: 18 March 2011
- Recorded: 2011
- Genre: Pop
- Length: 4:11
- Songwriter: Lionel Richie
- Producer: RedOne

Lionel Richie singles chronology
"Just Go" (2009)	"All Night Long (All Night)" (2011)	"Endless Love" (2012)

Guy Sebastian singles chronology
"Who's That Girl" (2010)	"All Night Long" (2011)	"Don't Worry Be Happy" (2011)

Richie recorded a new version of the song with Australian singer Guy Sebastian in 2011. All proceeds went towards the Queensland floods and New Zealand earthquake appeal. The re-recorded version was produced by RedOne and was released to iTunes Stores in Australia and New Zealand on 18 and 16 March, respectively.

=== Charts ===
It debuted on the New Zealand Singles Chart at number twelve on 21 March 2011 and on the Australian ARIA Singles Chart at number twenty-six on 28 March 2011.

Chart (2011)	Peak position
Australia (ARIA)	26
New Zealand (Recorded Music NZ)	12

== Jacob Collier version ==
In 2018, English musician Jacob Collier collaborated with Take 6 and the Metropole Orkest on a version of "All Night Long". Collier's arrangement won the 2020 Grammy Award for Best Arrangement, Instruments and Vocals. The version was included on Collier's studio album Djesse Vol. 1 (2018). The album peaked at number six on the Billboard Top Classical Albums and Top Jazz Albums.

== Benjamin Ingrosso version ==
"All Night Long (All Night)"

Single by Benjamin Ingrosso
- Released: March 2019
- Recorded: 2019
- Studio: Spotify Studios, Stockholm
- Genre: Pop
- Length: 3:08
- Label: TEN Music Group
- Songwriter: Lionel Richie
- Producer: Hampus

Benjamin Ingrosso singles chronology
"Behave" (2018)	"All Night Long (All Night)" (2019)	"Happy Thoughts" (2019)

In 2019, Swedish singer Benjamin Ingrosso recorded a version at the Spotify studios, Stockholm. It was released in March 2019 and peaked at number 5 on the Swedish charts and was certified platinum in June 2019. The rearranged version of the song, titled as "All Night Long (All Night) [2020 Edit]" was released on 17 July 2020.

=== Charts ===
==== Weekly charts ====
Chart (2019)	Peak position
Sweden (Sverigetopplistan)	5

==== Year-end charts ====
Chart (2019)	Position
Sweden (Sverigetopplistan)	49

=== Certifications ===
Region	Certification	Certified units/sales
Norway (IFPI Norway)	Gold	30,000^{‡}
Streaming
Sweden (GLF)	3× Platinum	24,000,000^{†}
^{‡} Sales+streaming figures based on certification alone.^{†} Streaming-only figures based on certification alone.

== Samplings ==
A sample of the song was used in "Fuego", a 2007 song by the American girl group the Cheetah Girls. Parts of the song were used in "I Like It", a 2010 song composed by Enrique Iglesias, Pitbull, and RedOne with samplings from Lionel Richie as the 1983 classic is interpolated after the first and third choruses.

== See also ==
- List of Hot 100 number-one singles of 1983 (U.S.)
- List of number-one R&B singles of 1983 (U.S.)
- List of number-one adult contemporary singles of 1983 (U.S.)
