= Tror du att han bryr sig =

Single by Benjamin Ingrosso and Felix Sandman

from the album Identification (Deluxe Edition)
- Released: 4 May 2018
- Genre: Pop
- Length: 2:53
- Label: TEN; Sony
- Songwriter(s): Benjamin Ingrosso; Hampus Lindvall
- Producer(s): Tross

Benjamin Ingrosso singles chronology
"Dance You Off" (2018)	"Tror du att han bryr sig" (2018)	"I Wouldn't Know" (2018)

Felix Sandman singles chronology
"Every Single Day" (2018)	"Tror du att han bryr sig" (2018)	"Imprint" (2018)

"Tror du att han bryr sig" (transl. "Do you think he cares?") is a song performed by Swedish singers Benjamin Ingrosso and Felix Sandman. A Swedish language version of Ingrosso's 2017 single "Do You Think About Me", the edited version was released as a digital download on 4 May 2018 by TEN Music Group and Sony Music. The song peaked at number 7 on the Swedish Singles Chart, was certified platinum in Sweden in August 2018 and 2× platinum in February 2020.

== Music video ==
A music video to accompany the release of "Tror du att Han Bryr Sig" was first released onto YouTube on 3 May 2018 at a total length of two minutes and fifty-three seconds.

== Track listing ==
Digital download
No.	Title	Length
1.	"Tror du att han bryr sig"	2:53

== Charts ==
=== Weekly charts ===
Chart (2018)	Peak position
Sweden (Sverigetopplistan)	7

=== Year-end charts ===
Chart (2018)	Position
Sweden (Sverigetopplistan)	87

== Certifications ==
Region	Certification	Certified units/sales
Sweden (GLF)	2× Platinum	16,000,000^{†}
^{†} Streaming-only figures based on certification alone.

== Release history ==
Region	Date	Format	Label
Sweden	4 May 2018	Digital download; streaming	TEN; Sony
