= Behave (Benjamin Ingrosso song) =

2018 single by Benjamin Ingrosso

Single by Benjamin Ingrosso

from the album Identification
- Released: 1 October 2018
- Recorded: 2018
- Genre: Pop
- Length: 3:19
- Label: TEN
- Songwriter(s): Benjamin Ingrosso; Erik Hassle; James Wong; Madison Love
- Producer(s): Gladius

Benjamin Ingrosso singles chronology
"Paradise" (2018)	"Behave" (2018)	"All Night Long (All Night)" (2019)

"Behave" is a song recorded by Swedish singer Benjamin Ingrosso. The song was released in Sweden on 1 October 2018 as the third single from Ingrosso's debut studio album, Identification. "Behave" peaked at number 8 on the Sverigetopplistan. The song was certified gold in Sweden in February 2019.

== Music video ==
A music video to accompany the release of "Behave" was directed by Carl-Johan Listherby and released on 1 October 2018.

== Track listings ==
No.	Title	Length
1.	"Behave" (radio edit)	3:19

Remixes
No.	Title	Length
1.	"Behave" (James Carter radio remix)	2:54
2.	"Behave" (James Carter club edit)	3:50
3.	"Behave" (radio edit)	3:19

== Charts ==
Chart (2018)	Peak position
Sweden (Sverigetopplistan)	8

== Certifications ==
Region	Certification	Certified units/sales
Sweden (GLF)	Gold	4,000,000^{†}
^{†} Streaming-only figures based on certification alone.

== Release history ==
Region	Date	Format	Label
Sweden	1 October 2018	Streaming	TEN
Various	14 December 2018	Digital download, streaming	TEN
