= Do You Think About Me (Benjamin Ingrosso song) =

Single by Benjamin Ingrosso
- Released: 5 May 2017
- Recorded: 2016
- Genre: Pop
- Length: 3:12
- Label: TEN
- Songwriter(s): Hampus Lindvall: Markus Sepehrmanesh; Benjamin Ingrosso

Benjamin Ingrosso singles chronology
"Good Lovin'" (2017)	"Do You Think About Me" (2017)	"One More Time" (2017)

"Do You Think About Me" is a song recorded by Swedish singer Benjamin Ingrosso. The song was released as a digital download in Sweden on 5 May 2017, peaked at number 87 on the Swedish Singles Chart and was certified gold in Sweded in 2018.

== Music video ==
A music video to accompany the release of "Do You Think About Me" was first released onto YouTube on 19 May 2017 at a total length of three minutes and thirteen seconds.

== Track listing ==
Digital download
No.	Title	Length
1.	"Do You Think About Me"	3:12

Digital download (Galavant remix)
No.	Title	Length
1.	"Do You Think About Me"	2:56

== Chart performance ==
=== Weekly charts ===
Chart (2017)	Peak position
Sweden (Sverigetopplistan)	87

== Certifications ==
Region	Certification	Certified units/sales
Sweden (GLF)	Gold	4,000,000^{†}
^{†} Streaming-only figures based on certification alone.

== Release history ==
Region	Date	Format	Label
Sweden	5 May 2017	Digital download	TEN
