= Emotions (Felix Sandman album) =

EMOTIONS

Studio album by Felix Sandman
- Released: 14 September 2018
- Genre: Pop
- Label: TEN; Artist House
- Producer: Hampus Lindvall; David Bowden; Gregg Wattenberg; Faux Delorean; Noah Conrad; Nicki Adamsson; David Larsson; David Kjellstrand; Michel Schulz; Andreas Roos; Robert Habolin

Singles from EMOTIONS
- 1. "Every Single Day" Released: 25 February 2018; 2. "Imprint" Released: 20 July 2018; 3. "Lovisa" Released: 14 September 2018; 4. "Miss You Like Crazy" Released: 15 March 2019

Professional ratings
Review scores
Source	Rating
Aftonbladet	3/5 stars

Emotions is the debut studio album by Swedish singer and songwriter Felix Sandman. It was released on 14 September 2018 by TEN Music Group and Artist House and peaked at number three on the Swedish Albums Chart.

== Track listing ==
All song titles stylized in capital letters.

No.	Title	Writer(s)	Producer(s)	Length
1.	"Part of Me"	Karl Wilhelm Sandman; Hampus Lindvall; David Kjellstrand	Lindvall	2:45
2.	"Imprint"	Jesse Finkelstein; Jordan Miller; David Bowden; Gregg Wattenberg	Bowden; Wattenberg	3:01
3.	"Lovisa"	Sandman; Robin Ellingsen; Bali Harko; Sarah Blanchard; Jonny Hockings	Faux Delorean	2:37
4.	"Miss You Like Crazy" (previously titled "Everything is Great")	Sandman; Alma Goodman; Jake Torrey; Klara Elias; Noah Conrad	Conrad	3:00
5.	"Hands on You"	Sandman; Conrad; Torrey; Roland Spreckley	Conrad	2:50
6.	"Trouble"	Sandman; Michael Matosic; Michelle Buzz; Nicki Adamsson	Adamsson	3:01
7.	"Are You?"	Sandman; Ellingsen; Harko; Blanchard; Parker James	Delorean	3:14
8.	"0 Emotions"	Sandman; David Larsson; David Kjellstrand	Larsson; Kjellstrand	4:03
9.	"Human"	Sandman; Ellingsen; Harko; Matosic; Buzz	Delorean	3:16
10.	"Tone It Down."	Sandman; Melanie Fontana; Michel Schulz	Schulz	3:56
11.	"Every Single Day"	Sandman; James; Torrey; Conrad; Tony Ferrari	Andreas Roos; Robert Habolin	3:05
Total length:				34:48

== Charts ==
=== Weekly charts ===
Chart (2018)	Peak position
Swedish Albums (Sverigetopplistan)	3

=== Year-end charts ===
Chart (2018)	Position
Swedish Albums (Sverigetopplistan)	100

Chart (2019)	Position
Swedish Albums (Sverigetopplistan)	31
