= Every Single Day (Felix Sandman song) =

Single by Felix Sandman

from the album Emotions
- Released: 25 February 2018
- Recorded: 2017
- Genre: Pop
- Length: 3:04
- Label: TEN; Sony
- Songwriter(s): Karl Wilhelm Sandman; Parker James; Jake Torrey; Noah Conrad; Tony Ferrari
- Producer(s): Andreas Roos; Robert Habolin

Felix Sandman singles chronology
"Every Single Day" (2018)	"Tror du att han bryr sig" (2018)

"Every Single Day" is the debut solo single by Swedish singer Felix Sandman. The song competed in Melodifestivalen 2018, where it made it to the Second Chance round, and then to the final after winning the duel against Mimi Werner, placing second with 158 points. It reached number one on the Swedish singles chart.

== Track listing ==
Digital download
No.	Title	Length
1.	"Every Single Day"	3:04

Digital download (Orchestral Version)
No.	Title	Length
1.	"Every Single Day" (Orchestral version)	3:07

== Charts ==
=== Weekly charts ===
Chart (2018)	Peak position
Sweden (Sverigetopplistan)	1

=== Year-end charts ===
Chart (2018)	Position
Sweden (Sverigetopplistan)	28
