= En gång i tiden =

Studio album by Benjamin Ingrosso
- Released: 15 January 2021
- Genre: Pop
- Length: 23:36
- Language: Swedish
- Label: TEN Music
- Producer: Benjamin Ingrosso; Hampus Lindvall; Aron WyMe; Sebastian Atas; Robert Habolin; Victor Sjörström; Vicktor Broberg; Stefan Olsson; Anders Glenmark

Benjamin Ingrosso chronology
Identification (2018)	En gång i tiden (2021)	En gång i tiden (del 2) (2021)

Singles from En gång i tiden
- 1. "Flickan på min gata" Released: 11 January 2021

En gång i tiden (transl. Once Upon a Time) is the second studio album by Swedish singer Benjamin Ingrosso, released on 15 January 2021 by TEN Music Group. Ingrosso's first album in Swedish, he is credited as a co-producer on every song. Dealing with themes of love, friendship, and childhood, Ingrosso described the album as an homage to 1990s pop, with influences from Orup, Mauro Scocco, and Lisa Nilsson. In mid-2020, Ingrosso was a contestant on the Swedish music reality series Så mycket bättre; two of his covers from the series are included on the track listing, including "Långsamt farväl", originally by Nilsson. The lyrics of "Längst inne i mitt huvud" were taken from a poem by Swedish writer Barbro Lindgren. "Flickan på min gata", written when Ingrosso was 12–13 years old, was released as a single on 11 January 2021.

The album debuted at number one on the Swedish national albums chart published by the Swedish Recording Industry Association. A follow-up album, En gång i tiden (del 2), was released on 16 April 2021; En gång i tiden was subsequently listed as En gång i tiden (del 1) on some streaming services.

== Critical reception ==
Professional ratings
Review scores
Source	Rating
Aftonbladet	3/5 stars
Borås Tidning	2/5 stars
Dagens Nyheter	3/5 stars
Gaffa	5/6 stars
Göteborgs-Posten	3/5 stars
Nöjesguiden	4/6 stars

En gång i tiden received mixed reviews from domestic music critics. In a review for Dagens Nyheter, the album's modern pop sound was praised, but criticism was aimed at the vocals' use of Auto-Tune and the lyrics' lack of emotion. A reviewer for Nöjesguiden noted the memorable lyrics and nostalgic sound but found the album lacked a common theme. Aftonbladet and Gaffa both highlighted Ingrosso's maturity in recording Swedish-language songs compared to his English-language debut in 2018, noting the more personal subject matter of their lyrics. A two-star review from Borås Tidning praised Ingrosso's songwriting but felt that the album's tracks were "safe", unexciting, and not memorable.

== Track listing ==
Credits adapted from Tidal.

En gång i tiden track listing
No.	Title	Writer(s)	Producers	Length
1.	"Känns som att livet börjar hända"	Aron Bergerwall; Benjamin Ingrosso; Tobias Bergerwall; Wilhelm Börjesson	Aron WyMe; Ingrosso	3:11
2.	"Barnasinnet"	Ingrosso	Ingrosso; Sebastian Atas	3:26
3.	"Tänd alla ljus"	Charlie Bernardo Kågell; Isak Bornebusch Alverus; Leslie Kocuvie-Tay; Silvana Imam	Ingrosso; Robert Habolin	3:02
4.	"Vad skulle hända om vi försvann..?"	Ingrosso; Sebastian Atas; Victor Sjöström; Viktor Broberg	Ingrosso; Atas; Sjöström; Broberg	2:24
5.	"Se men inte röra"	Ingrosso; Robert Habolin	Ingrosso; Habolin	2:52
6.	"Längst inne i mitt huvud"	Ingrosso; Barbro Lindgren; Hampus Lindvall	Ingrosso; Lindvall	2:41
7.	"Långsamt farväl"	Mauro Scocco	Ingrosso; Habolin; Stefan Olsson	3:05
8.	"Flickan på min gata"	Ingrosso; Niclas Wahlgren	Anders Glenmark; Ingrosso; Lindvall	2:55
Total length:				23:36

== Charts ==
=== Weekly charts ===
Weekly chart performance for En gång i tiden
Chart (2021)	Peak position
Swedish Albums (Sverigetopplistan)	1

=== Year-end charts ===
Year-end chart performance for En gång i tiden
Chart	Year	Position
Swedish Albums (Sverigetopplistan)	2021	11
Swedish Albums (Sverigetopplistan)	2023	65
Swedish Albums (Sverigetopplistan)	2024	49

== Certifications ==
Region	Certification	Certified units/sales
Sweden (GLF)	Gold	15,000^{‡}
^{‡} Sales+streaming figures based on certification alone.

== See also ==
- List of number-one singles and albums in Sweden
