= Fall in Love (Benjamin Ingrosso song) =

Single by Benjamin Ingrosso
- Released: 9 October 2015
- Recorded: 2015
- Genre: Pop
- Length: 3:47
- Label: TEN

Benjamin Ingrosso singles chronology
"Fall in Love" (2015)	"Crystal Clear" (2015)

"Fall in Love" is a song recorded by the Swedish singer Benjamin Ingrosso. The song was released as a digital download in Sweden on 9 October, 2015 and peaked at number 56 on the Swedish Singles Chart. The song was certified gold in Sweden in April 2017.

== Music video ==
A music video to accompany the release of "Fall in Love" was first released onto YouTube on 9 October 2015 at a total length of three minutes and forty-nine seconds.

== Track listing ==
Digital download
No.	Title	Length
1.	"Fall In Love"	3:47

== Chart performance ==
Chart (2015)	Peak position
Sweden (Sverigetopplistan)	56

== Certifications ==
Region	Certification	Certified units/sales
Sweden (GLF)	Gold	20,000^{‡}
^{‡} Sales+streaming figures based on certification alone.

== Release history ==
Region	Date	Format	Label
Sweden	9 October 2015	Digital download	TEN
