= I Wouldn't Know =

Single by Benjamin Ingrosso

from the album Identification
- Released: 27 July 2018
- Recorded: 2018
- Genre: Pop
- Length: 2:56
- Label: TEN
- Songwriter(s): Benjamin Ingrosso; Noah Conrad; Anika Wells; Jake Torrey
- Producer(s): Noah Conrad; Omega

Benjamin Ingrosso singles chronology
"Tror du att han bryr sig" (2018)	"I Wouldn't Know" (2018)	"Paradise" (2018)

"I Wouldn't Know" is a song recorded by Swedish singer Benjamin Ingrosso. The song was released in Sweden on 27 July 2018 as the second single from Ingrosso's debut studio album, Identification. "I Wouldn't Know" peaked at number 30 on the Swedish Singles Chart.

== Music video ==
A music video to accompany the release of "I Wouldn't Know" was directed by Robin Nadir and released on 26 August 2018.

== Track listing ==
Digital download
No.	Title	Length
1.	"I Wouldn't Know"	2:56

== Charts ==
Chart (2018)	Peak position
Sweden (Sverigetopplistan)	30

== Certifications ==
Region	Certification	Certified units/sales
Sweden (GLF)	Gold	4,000,000^{†}
^{†} Streaming-only figures based on certification alone.

== Release history ==
Region	Date	Format	Label
Sweden	27 July 2018	Digital download, streaming	TEN
