= The Dirt (song) =

Single by Benjamin Ingrosso
- Released: 17 January 2020
- Recorded: 2019
- Length: 2:32
- Label: TEN
- Songwriters: Benjamin Ingrosso; Didrik Franzén; Hampus Lindvall; Markus Sepehrmanesh; Valentin Brunel
- Producers: Didrik Franzén; Hampus; Valentin Brunel

Benjamin Ingrosso singles chronology
"Costa Rica" (2019)	"The Dirt" (2020)	"Shampoo" (2020)

"The Dirt" is a song by the Swedish singer Benjamin Ingrosso. It was released as a single on 17 January 2020 by TEN Music Group. The song peaked at number 14 on the Swedish Singles Chart. It was written by Ingrosso, Didrik Franzén, Hampus Lindvall, Markus Sepehrmanesh and Valentin Brunel.

== Music video ==
A music video to accompany the release of "The Dirt" was released onto YouTube on 16 January 2020.

== Track listing ==
Digital download
No.	Title	Length
1.	"The Dirt"	2:32
2.	"The Dirt" (alternative version)	2:52

Digital download
No.	Title	Length
1.	"The Dirt" (Younotus remix)	2:39

Digital download
No.	Title	Length
1.	"The Dirt" (Nevada remix)	2:52

Digital download
No.	Title	Length
1.	"The Dirt" (Osrin remix)	2:40

== Personnel ==
Credits adapted from Tidal.

- Didrik Franzén – producer, writer
- Hampus Lindvall – producer, writer
- Valentin Brunel – producer, writer
- Benjamin Ingrosso – writer
- Markus Sepehrmanesh – writer
- Björn Engelmann – engineer

== Charts ==
Chart (2020)	Peak position
Sweden (Sverigetopplistan)	14

== Certifications ==
Region	Certification	Certified units/sales
Sweden (GLF)	Platinum	8,000,000^{†}
^{†} Streaming-only figures based on certification alone.
