= Good Lovin' (Benjamin Ingrosso song) =

Single by Benjamin Ingrosso
- Released: 25 February 2017
- Recorded: 2016
- Genre: Pop; R&B; synthpop
- Length: 3:00
- Label: TEN
- Songwriter(s): Benjamin Ingrosso; Louis Schoorl; Matt Parad; MAG

Benjamin Ingrosso singles chronology
"Love You Again" (2016)	"Good Lovin'" (2017)	"Do You Think About Me" (2017)

"Good Lovin'" is a song recorded by Swedish singer Benjamin Ingrosso. The song was released as a digital download in Sweden on 25 February 2017 and peaked at number 11 on the Swedish Singles Chart. It took part in Melodifestivalen 2017, and qualified to the final from the second semi-final on 11 February 2017. It was written by Ingrosso, Louis Schoorl, Matt Parad, and MAG. "Good Lovin'" was certified platinum in Sweden.

== Music video ==
A music video to accompany the release of "Good Lovin'" was first released onto YouTube on 1 March 2017 at a total length of two minutes and fifty-nine seconds.

== Track listing ==
Digital download
No.	Title	Length
1.	"Good Lovin'"	3:00

Digital download (acoustic)
No.	Title	Length
1.	"Good Lovin'" (acoustic)	2:57

== Chart performance ==
=== Weekly charts ===
Chart (2017)	Peak position
Sweden (Sverigetopplistan)	10

== Certifications ==
Region	Certification	Certified units/sales
Sweden (GLF)	Platinum	40,000^{‡}
^{‡} Sales+streaming figures based on certification alone.

== Release history ==
Region	Date	Format	Label
Sweden	25 February 2017	Digital download	TEN
