= Playlist (Benjamin Ingrosso album) =

Studio album by Benjamin Ingrosso
- Released: 17 June 2022
- Length: 42:22
- Label: TEN Music

Benjamin Ingrosso chronology
En gång i tiden (del 2) (2021)	Playlist (2022)	Live at Konserthuset Stockholm (2022)

Singles from Playlist
- 1. "Queens" Released: 15 April 2022; 2. "Black & Blue" Released: 20 May 2022; 3. "Dancing on a Sunny Day" Released: 10 June 2022

Playlist is the fourth studio album by Swedish singer Benjamin Ingrosso, released on 17 June 2022 by TEN Music Group. The album debuted at number four on the Swedish album chart.

== Critical reception ==
Scandipop said "Playlist is seemingly so called, because it's the sound of your very favourite playlist booming out when you need that sonic pick-me-up the most... And all delivered via the vocals of an artist it's always an absolute delight to listen to sing. Benjamin Ingrosso's new album is most definitely our new playlist."

Natalie Mourad from Nöjesguiden called the album "underwhelming" calling the sound "quite uniform, or monotonous, throughout the album."

== Track listing ==
Playlist track listing
No.	Title	Writer(s)	Length
1.	"Happy Birthday"	Benjamin Ingrosso; Robert Habolin; Christopher Nissen	2:25
2.	"Bullet"	Ingrosso; Markus Sepehrmanesh; Thomas Troelsen	3:23
3.	"Dance for Me"	Ingrosso; Louis Schoorl; Linnea Södahl	3:05
4.	"Rewind It"	Ingrosso; Jonas Becker; Kaci Brown; Timofei Crudo; Sam Gray	2:27
5.	"Dancing On a Sunny Day"	Ingrosso; Petter Alfredsson; Aron Bergerwall; William Forsling; Koda; Louise Lindberg; Sepehrmanesh	2:56
6.	"Me Without You"	Ingrosso; Habolin	3:12
7.	"Don't Leave Me Hanging"	Ingrosso; Sebastian Atas; Sepehrmanesh	3:17
8.	"Loser"	Ingrosso; Lindberg; Victor Rådström; Argin Rahmani	3:19
9.	"Heart of Glass"	Ingrosso; Hampus Lindvall; Sodahl	3:15
10.	"Queens"	Ingrosso; Amanda Cygnaeus; Madeline Eliasson	2:57
11.	"Afterlife"	Ingrosso; Sepehrmanesh; Jacob Werner	3:42
12.	"Can Somebody Find Her?"	Ingrosso; Amanda Kongshaug; Werner	3:02
13.	"These Are the Times"	Ingrosso; Lindberg; Rådström	2:46
14.	"Black & Blue" (with Hugel)	Ingrosso; Rachel Boerner; Loris Cimino; Florent Hugel; Maximilian Riehl	2:28
Total length:			42:22

== Charts ==
Weekly chart performance for Playlist
Chart (2022)	Peak position
Swedish Albums (Sverigetopplistan)	4
