= Identification (album) =

Studio album by Benjamin Ingrosso
- Released: 28 September 2018
- Recorded: 2016–2018
- Genre: Pop, Europop, R&B, dance
- Length: 36:09
- Language: English; Swedish
- Label: TEN
- Producer: Benjamin Ingrosso; Gladius; Noah Conrad; Omega; Axident; Hampus Lindvall; Fernando; Kungs; Didrik Franzén; K. Nita; Louis Schoorl; Tross; Sam Crow

Benjamin Ingrosso chronology
Identification (2018)	En gång i tiden (del 1) (2021)

Singles from Identification
- 1. "Dance You Off" Released: 2 March 2018; 2. "I Wouldn't Know" Released: 27 July 2018; 3. "Behave" Released: 1 October 2018

Identification is the debut studio album by Swedish singer and songwriter Benjamin Ingrosso. It was released on 28 September 2018, by TEN Music Group. The album received favourable reviews from critics.

A deluxe edition of the album was released in February 2019, featuring three new tracks including "Tror du att han bryr sig".

== Critical reception ==
Professional ratings
Review scores
Source	Rating
Gaffa	4/6 stars
auspOp	4/5 stars

Identification received positive reviews from music critics.

== Track listing ==
No.	Title	Writer(s)	Producer(s)	Length
1.	"Behave"	Benjamin Ingrosso; Erik Hassle; James Wong; Madison Love	Gladius	3:20
2.	"I Wouldn't Know"	Ingrosso; Noah Conrad; Anika Wells; Jake Torrey	Conrad; Omega	2:58
3.	"I'll Be Fine Somehow"	Ingrosso; Andreas Schuller; Maureen McDonald	Axident	3:03
4.	"So Good So Fine When You're Messing with My Mind"	Ingrosso; Hampus Lindvall; Rollo Spreckley	Hampus	2:58
5.	"Spotlights"	Ingrosso; Conrad; Alma Goodman; Parker James	Conrad	2:35
6.	"No Sleep"	Ingrosso; Torrey; Nick Long	Fernando; Omega	2:56
7.	"Love Songs"	Ingrosso; Torrey; Long	Fernando; Omega	3:15
8.	"Good Intentions"	Ingrosso; Lindvall; Sam Fisher	Hampus	3:27
9.	"All I See Is You"	Ingrosso; Lindvall; Didrik Franzén; Valentin Brunel	Kungs; Franzén; Hampus	2:30
10.	"If This Bed Could Talk"	Ingrosso; K. Nita	Ingrosso; Nita; Hampus	4:10
11.	"Dance You Off"	Ingrosso; Nita; Louis Schoorl; Marco Borrero	Schoorl; Mag	3:03
12.	"Happiness"	Ingrosso	Hampus	1:54
Total length:				36:09

Identification — Deluxe edition (bonus tracks)
No.	Title	Writer(s)	Producer(s)	Length
13.	"Tror du att han bryr sig" (with Felix Sandman)	Ingrosso; Lindvall	Tross	2:53
14.	"1989"	Ingrosso; Robert Habolin	Ingrosso; Habolin	3:07
15.	"Fancy"	Ingrosso; James; Timothy Caifeldt	Sam Crow	3:16
Total length:				45:25

== Charts ==
=== Weekly charts ===
Chart (2018)	Peak position
Norwegian Albums (VG-lista)	18
Swedish Albums (Sverigetopplistan)	1

=== Year-end charts ===
Chart (2018)	Position
Swedish Albums (Sverigetopplistan)	45

Chart (2019)	Position
Swedish Albums (Sverigetopplistan)	48

== Certifications ==
Region	Certification	Certified units/sales
Sweden (GLF)	Platinum	30,000^{‡}
^{‡} Sales+streaming figures based on certification alone.
