= Smile (Benjamin Ingrosso song) =

Single by Benjamin Ingrosso
- Released: 21 May 2021
- Length: 3:12
- Label: TEN
- Songwriters: Benjamin Ingrosso; Britt Burton; Hampus Lindvall
- Producer: Hampus Lindvall

Benjamin Ingrosso singles chronology
"Allt det vackra" (2021)	"Smile" (2021)	"Not Anybody's Fault" (2021)

Music video
- "Smile" on YouTube

"Smile" is a song by Swedish singer Benjamin Ingrosso. It was released on 21 May 2021 by TEN Music Group. The song peaked at number 11 on the Sverigetopplistan.

Remixes were released on 2 July 2021 and additional versions on 16 July 2021.

== Critical reception ==
Scandipop said, "As alluded to in the title, it's a merry, upbeat bop – infectiously so. The song features strings aplenty brought to the fore throughout, and the chorus sounds like something that could have been lifted from one of Avicii's classics."

== Track listing ==
Digital download
No.	Title	Length
1.	"Smile"	3:12

Remixes
No.	Title	Length
1.	"Smile" (Michael Feiner remix)	4:40
2.	"Smile" (Michael Feiner remix - radio edit)	3:02
3.	"Smile" (Meyer remix)	2:55
4.	"Smile" (Kronan & SUD remix)	3:07
5.	"Smile" (Veras remix)	2:39
6.	"Smile"	3:12

Additional versions
No.	Title	Length
1.	"Smile" (acoustic)	3:05
2.	"Smile" (with the Royal Stockholm Philharmonic Orchestra)	3:32
3.	"Smile"	3:12

== Charts ==
=== Weekly charts ===
Weekly chart performance for "Smile"
Chart (2021)	Peak position
Sweden (Sverigetopplistan)	11

=== Year-end charts ===
Chart (2021)	Position
Sweden (Sverigetopplistan)	71

== Certifications ==
Region	Certification	Certified units/sales
Sweden (GLF)	Platinum	8,000,000^{†}
^{†} Streaming-only figures based on certification alone.
