= Felix Sandman =

Swedish singer

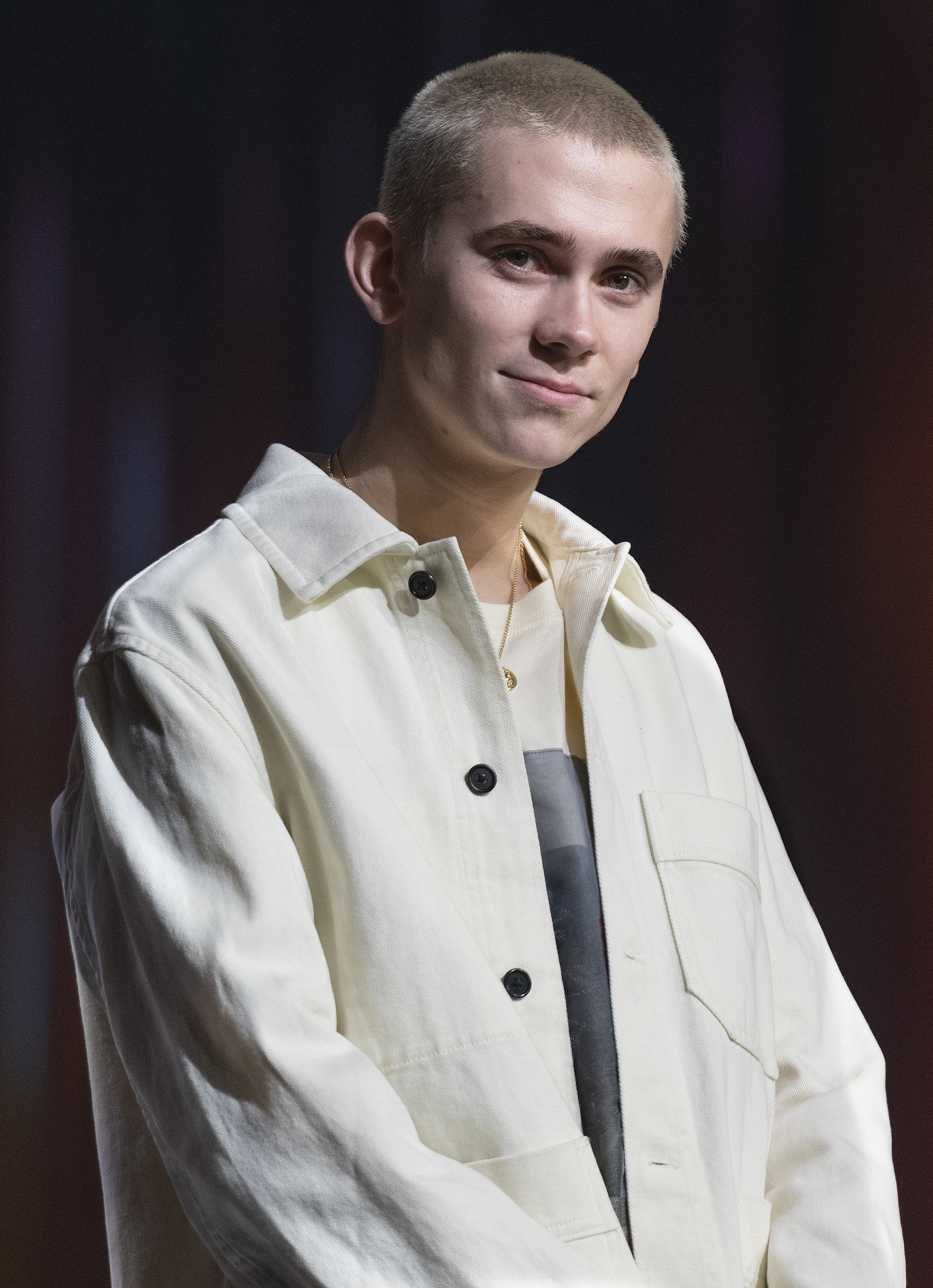
- Sandman in 2020

Background information
- Born: Karl Felix Wilhelm Sandman; 25 October 1998 (age 27); Värmdö, Stockholm County, Sweden
- Genres: Pop; soul; R&B
- Occupations: singer; songwriter; actor
- Labels: TEN; Sony Music Sweden
- Website: Felix Sandman on Instagram

Karl Felix Wilhelm Sandman (born 25 October 1998) is a Swedish singer and actor. He is best known as a member of the boy band FO&O with two studio albums Off the Grid (2014) and FO&O (2017). He plays Sebastian Fagerman in the first Swedish Netflix original series Quicksand, which premiered on 5 April 2019.

== Career ==
In 2017, FO&O split, and Sandman launched a solo career. His first solo single "Every Single Day" peaked at number one on the Swedish singles chart. Sandman took part in Melodifestivalen 2018 with the song making it to the Second Chance round where Sandman and Mimi Werner duelled for a place in the final. Sandman won the duel qualifying to the Melodifestivalen 2018 final at Friends Arena. He finished in second place in the final. Sandman was the spokesperson for Sweden at the Eurovision Song Contest 2018. Later that year, he released his debut album Emotions and went on his first tour as a solo artist alongside friend and colleague Benjamin Ingrosso.

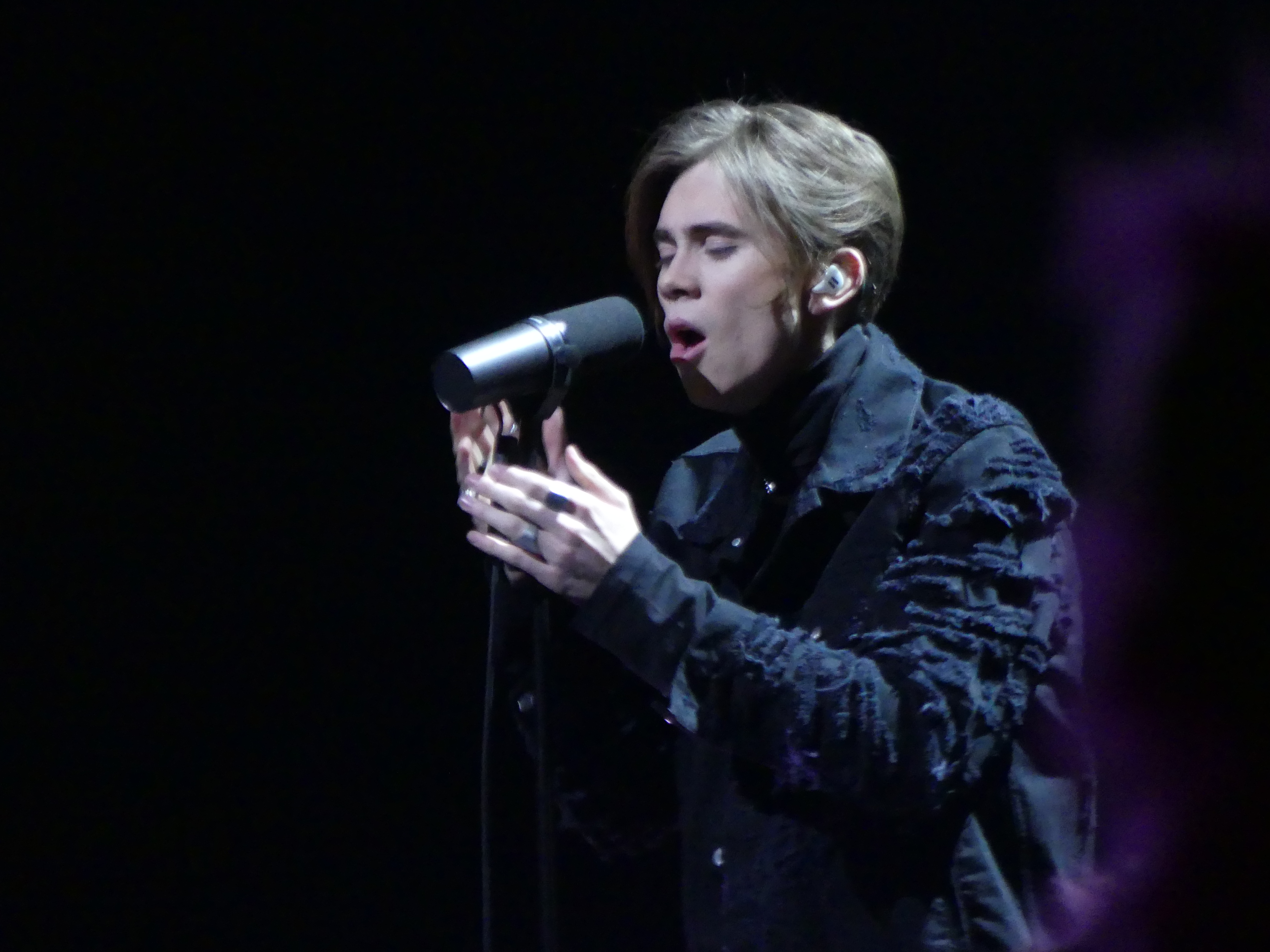
Sandman performing in 2018

In 2018, Sandman was cast in the main role of Sebastian Fagerman on the Netflix crime drama Quicksand. The series is inspired by the novel of the same name written by Malin Persson Giolito and is the first Swedish produced original series for Netflix. The series premiered on 5 April 2019.

Also in 2019, Sandman was cast as Jonas in a Netflix comedy drama series Home for Christmas released in December 2019 this series was also Netflix's first Norwegian original series. It was renewed for a second series in 2020, and despite a long break in filming, a third season was released on Netflix in December 2025.

In 2020, Sandman competed in Melodifestivalen 2020 with the song "Boys with Emotions", reaching the finale through the Second Chance round. He finished in seventh place, scoring a total of 67 points.

In January 2025, Sandman released Yue.

== Discography ==
=== Albums ===
Title	Album details	Peak chart positions
Title	Album details	SWE
Emotions	Released: 14 September 2018; Label: TEN; Format: Digital download	3
Yue	Released: 31 January 2025; Label: Sandy Karlo, Sony Music Sweden; Format: Digital download	TBA

=== Singles ===
==== As lead artist ====
Title	Year	Peak chart positions		Certifications	Album
Title	Year	SWE	NOR	Certifications	Album
"Every Single Day"	2018	1	—	GLF: Platinum	Emotions
"Tror du att han bryr sig" (with Benjamin Ingrosso)	2018	7	—	GLF: 2× Platinum	Identification
"Imprint"	2018	52	—		Emotions
"Part of Me"	2018	—	—		Emotions
"Lovisa"	2018	34	—		Emotions
"Miss You Like Crazy"	2019	—	—		Emotions
"Something Right"	2019	85	—		TBA
"Happy Thoughts" (with Benjamin Ingrosso)	2019	15	—	GLF: Gold	TBA
"Middle of Nowhere"	2019	— (Note: "Middle of Nowhere" did not enter the Swedish Singellista Chart, but peaked at number seven on the Swedish Heatseeker Chart.)	—		TBA
"Mood for You"	2019	—	—		TBA
"Boys with Emotions"	2020	16	—		TBA
"Don't Look Back in Anger"	2020	—	—		TBA
"Relations" (featuring Astrid S)	2020	— (Note: "Relations" did not enter the Swedish Singellista Chart, but peaked at number two on the Swedish Heatseeker Chart.)	7	IFPI Norway: Gold	TBA
Nylon"	2025	—	—		Yue
"—" denotes a recording that did not chart or was not released in that territory.

==== As featuring artist ====
Title	Year
"Starfish" (Rhys featuring Felix Sandman)	2018

== Tours ==
=== Headlining ===
- Klubbturné (2019)

Date	City	Country	Venue
4 October 2019	Falun	Sweden	Falu Bowling & Krog
5 October 2019	Partille	Sweden	Partille Arena
11 October 2019	Helsingborg	Sweden	The Tivoli
2 October 2019	Skövde	Sweden	Bogrens
18 October 2019	Enköping	Sweden	Cinema
19 October 2019	Norrköping	Sweden	Arbis
25 October 2019	Örebro	Sweden	Ritz
26 October 2019	Malmö	Sweden	KB
8 November 2019	Umeå	Sweden	REX
9 November 2019	Skellefteå	Sweden	Verandan

=== Co-headlining ===
- Turné 2018 (with Benjamin Ingrosso) (2018–2019)

Date	City	Country	Venue
6 October 2018	Norrköping	Sweden	Louis de Geer konsert & kongress
7 October 2018	Karlstad	Sweden	Karlstad CCC
12 October 2018	Örebro	Sweden	Conventum
13 October 2018	Gothenburg	Sweden	Gothenburg Concert Hall
14 October 2018	Halmstad	Sweden	Halmstad Teater
19 October 2018	Luleå	Sweden	Kulturens Hus
20 October 2018	Gävle	Sweden	Konserthus
21 October 2018	Västeras	Sweden	Konserthus
26 October 2018	Eskilstuna	Sweden	Lokomotivet
28 October 2018	Linköping	Sweden	Konsert & Kongress
2 November 2018	Karlskrona	Sweden	Konserthus
3 November 2018	Jönköping	Sweden	Concert Hall
10 November 2018	Uppsala	Sweden	Konsert och Kongress
11 November 2018	Sundsvall	Sweden	Tonhallen
23 November 2018	Vara	Sweden	Konserthus
24 November 2018	Helsingborg	Sweden	Helsingborg Arena
4 December 2018	Malmö	Sweden	Malmö Live
12 December 2018	Stockholm	Sweden	Cirkus
16 May 2019	Stockholm	Sweden	Gröna Lund

=== Canceled concerts ===
Date	City	Country	Venue
18 November 2018	Kalmar	Sweden	Kalmarsalen

== Filmography ==
- Vi är bäst! (2013)
- Quicksand (Netflix series) (2019)
- Home for Christmas (Hjem til jul) (Netflix series) (2019–2025)
- Sommartider – Filmen om Gyllene Tider (2024)
- Sarek (2027)

== Awards and nominations ==
=== MTV Europe Music Awards ===
The MTV Europe Music Awards was established in 1994 by MTV Europe to award the music videos from European and International artists.

Year	Nominee / work	Award	Result	Ref.
2018	Himself	Best Swedish Act	Nominated	

=== Rockbjörnen ===
Rockbjörnen is a music prize in Sweden, divided into several categories, which is awarded annually by the newspaper Aftonbladet. The prize was first awarded in 1979, and is mostly centered on pop and rock.

Year	Nominee / work	Award	Result	Ref.
2018	Himself	Male Live Artist of the Year	Nominated	
2018	Himself	Breakthrough Artist of the Year	Won	
2018	"Every Single Day"	Swedish Song of the Year	Nominated	
2018	Felix Sandman Fans	Best Fans	Nominated	
2019	Himself	Male Live Artist of the Year	Nominated	
2019	Himself	Concert of the Year	Nominated	
2019	Felix Sandman Fans	Best Fans	Nominated	
