= Moonica Mac =

Swedish singer and songwriter

Lisa Linnea Brolander (born 4 December 1990), best known under her stage name Moonica Mac, is a Swedish singer and songwriter. Born in Dalarna and raised in Torsång, her stage name is a combination of the names of the performers Monica Zetterlund and Fleetwood Mac. Along with Benjamin Ingrosso she in 2021 released the song "Det stora röda huset".

In 2021, Mac was one of the singers in the twelfth season of Så mycket bättre, broadcast on TV4.

== Discography ==
=== Studio albums ===
Title	Year	Peak chart positions
Title	Year	SWE
Stark & sårbar	2019	46
Part Two	2022	37
Blau hajmel	2026	26

=== Singles ===
Title	Year	Peak chart positions	Album
Title	Year	SWE Heat	Album
"En hinning till Anton"	2017	—	Stark & sårbar
"Ibland"	2018	—	Stark & sårbar
"Till slutet av augusti"	2018	9	Stark & sårbar
"Vad haru tagit?"	2019	—	Stark & sårbar
"Syster sommar"	2019	—	Non-album single
"Räven och Tomten" (with Peter Jöback)	2019	—	Non-album single
"Alaska/All aska"	2020	—	Non-album single
"River"	2020	—	Non-album single
"Sjunga"	2020	—	Non-album single
"Hallå"	2020	—	Non-album single
"Vittran" (with Sara Parkman)	2021	—	Non-album single
"Kom till mig"	2021	8	Så mycket bättre
"Lassie" (featuring Sara Parkman, Vilma Flood and Janice)	2021	5	Så mycket bättre
"Månen"	2021	8	Så mycket bättre
"Dalarna"	2021	—	TBA

=== Other charting songs ===
Title	Year	Peak chart positions	Album
Title	Year	SWE	Album
"Det stora röda huset" (Benjamin Ingrosso featuring Moonica Mac)	2021	9	En gång i tiden (del 2)
