= Costa Rica (Benjamin Ingrosso song) =

Single by Benjamin Ingrosso
- Released: 12 July 2019
- Recorded: 2019
- Length: 3:08
- Label: TEN
- Songwriter: Benjamin Ingrosso

Benjamin Ingrosso singles chronology
"Happy Thoughts" (2019)	"Costa Rica" (2019)	"The Dirt" (2020)

"Costa Rica" is a song by Swedish singer Benjamin Ingrosso. It was released as a single on 12 July 2019 by TEN Music Group. The song peaked at number 17 on the Swedish Singles Chart.

== Background ==
The song references the end of Ingrosso's relationship with Linnea Wildmark. Talking about the song, Ingrosso said: "This song is incredibly personal to me. It's about that stage after a break up where you feel bitter about what happened and you haven’t really let the person go. If you listen carefully to the lyrics – you know exactly what the song is about."

== Track listing ==
Digital download
No.	Title	Length
1.	"Costa Rica"	3:08

== Charts ==
Chart (2019)	Peak position
Sweden (Sverigetopplistan)	17

== Certifications ==
Region	Certification	Certified units/sales
Sweden (GLF)	Gold	4,000,000^{†}
^{†} Streaming-only figures based on certification alone.
