= Bishara (singer) =

Syrian-Swedish singer

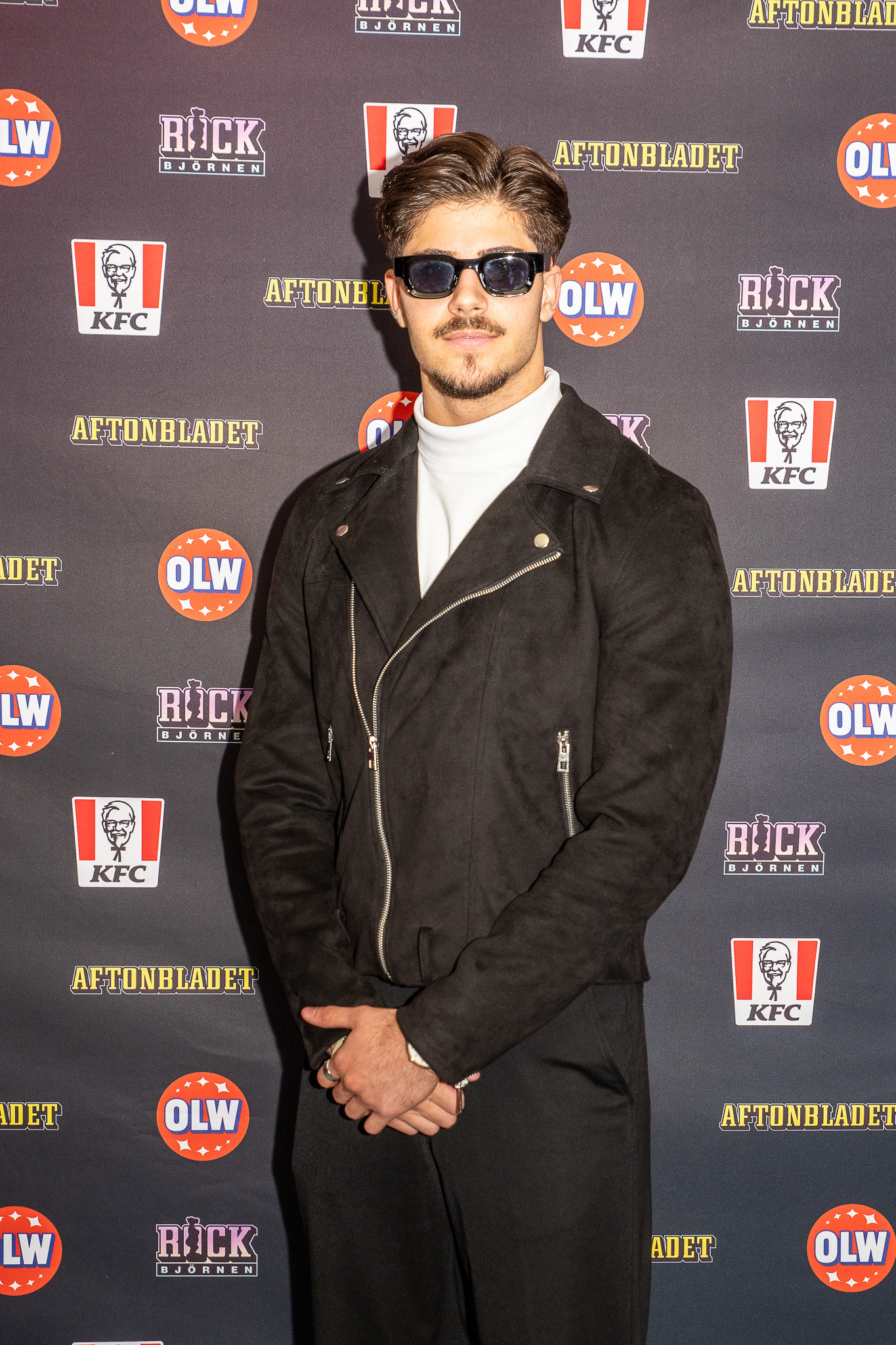
- Bishara in 2024

Background information
- Born: Bishara Morad; 23 January 2003 (age 22); Damascus, Syria
- Origin: Linköping, Sweden
- Occupation: Singer
- Years active: 2018–present
- Labels: TEN

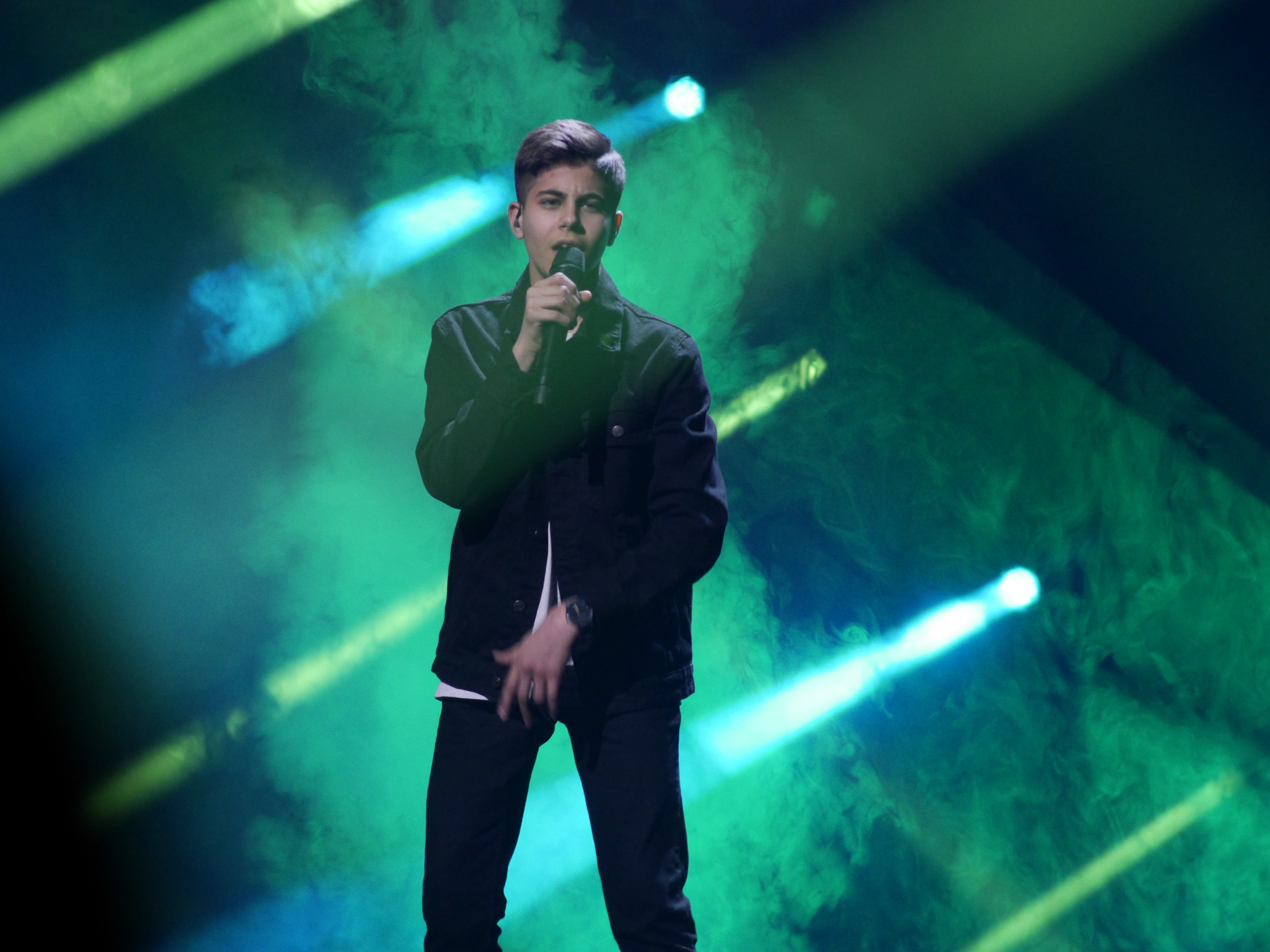
Bishara performing during Melodifestivalen 2019

Bishara Morad (Arabic: بشارة مراد bishāra murād, IPA: [bɪ'ʃaːrɐ mu'raːd]; born 23 January 2003), known simply as Bishara, is a Syrian-Swedish singer. He participated in the Melodifestivalen 2019 with the song "On My Own".

== Biography ==
=== Early life ===
Bishara Morad was born in Damascus, Syria, and immigrated with his family to the city of Linköping in Sweden when he was six years old.

=== Career ===
In 2018, Bishara was asked to sing in the school cafeteria by his music teacher and Bishara, who was unaware of his aptitude for singing, chose to upload a clip from the performance on YouTube and Instagram. Soon after he was discovered by singer, songwriter and music manager Laila Bagge. On 30 January 2019, he released his debut single "Home". And in February of the same year he competed in Melodifestivalen 2019 in the fourth semi-final with the song "On My Own", qualifying to the final.

=== Personal life ===
Morad is an Aramean belonging to the Syriac Orthodox Church, and has stated that his gift of singing comes from Jesus. He is as well a sub-deacon in St. Markus Syriac Orthodox church in Linköping for its youth group.

== Discography ==
=== Singles ===
Title	Year	Peak chart positions	Certification	Album
Title	Year	SWE	Certification	Album
"Home"	2019	—		Non-album singles
"On My Own"	2019	4	GLF: Platinum	Non-album singles
"Love Don't Let Me Down"	2019	—		Non-album singles
"Say It Ain't So" (with Leia)	2020	—		Non-album singles
"R U 4 Real?"	2020	—		Non-album singles
