= En gång i tiden (del 2) =

Studio album by Benjamin Ingrosso
- Released: 16 April 2021
- Recorded: 2020–2021
- Genre: Pop
- Length: 22:29
- Language: Swedish
- Label: TEN Music
- Producer: Benjamin Ingrosso; Hampus Lindvall; Anders Glenmark; Gustav Jonsson; Andreas Roos; Robert Habolin; Johan Landqvist

Benjamin Ingrosso chronology
En gång i tiden (del 1) (2021)	En gång i tiden (del 2) (2021)	Playlist (2022)

Singles from En gång i tiden (del 2)
- 1. "Allt det vackra" Released: 16 April 2021

En gång i tiden (del 2) (transl. Once Upon a Time (Part 2)) is the third studio album by Swedish singer Benjamin Ingrosso, released on 16 April 2021 by TEN Music Group. The album is a follow-up to Ingrosso's second studio album En gång i tiden (del 1), released on 15 January 2021. On the day of the album's release, Ingrosso gave a live performance of the single "Allt det vackra" on TV4's Efter fem, accompanied by Gustav Jonsson, one of the album's producers, and Viktor Olsén.

The album debuted at number one on the Swedish national albums chart published by the Swedish Recording Industry Association.

== Critical reception ==
Professional ratings
Review scores
Source	Rating
Aftonbladet	3/5

Reviewing the album for Aftonbladet, Markus Larsson wrote that there is a "warm and melancholy late summer feeling over the music" and found "Allt det vackra" and "Det stora röda huset" to be "among the best [songs] that Ingrosso has done so far". Although feeling that the album as a whole is "uneven", Larsson considered Ingrosso to be further laying "the foundation for a broad and varied career". Scandipop called En gång i tiden (del 2) "an essential album to take in, enjoy, and keep returning to in its entirety."

== Track listing ==
En gång i tiden (del 2) track listing
No.	Title	Writer(s)	Producer(s)	Length
1.	"Ouvertyr"	Wilhelm Börjesson; Mauro Scocco; Niclas Wahlgren; Benjamin Ingrosso; Barbro Lindgren; Aron Bergerwall; Britt Lindeborg; Hampus Lindvall; Roger Wallis; Tobias Bergerwall	Lindvall	0:54
2.	"Allt det vackra"	Lindvall; Wahlgren; Ingrosso	Lindvall; Anders Glenmark	3:24
3.	"Det stora röda huset" (featuring Moonica Mac)	Ingrosso; Lindvall; Brolander	Lindvall	2:58
4.	"I min lägenhet"	Ingrosso; Lindvall	Lindvall	3:40
5.	"Stockholm"	Gustav Jonsson; Ingrosso; Andreas Roos	Jonsson; Ingrosso; Roos	3:08
6.	"Judy min vän"	Brit Lindeborg; Wallis	Lindvall; Ingrosso	3:32
7.	"En gång i tiden"	Ingrosso; Robert Habolin	Ingrosso; Habolin	3:33
8.	"Avslutning"	Ingrosso	Johan Landqvist	1:20
Total length:				22:29

Notes

- "Ouvertyr" contains elements of "Längst inne i mitt huvud", "Känns som att livet börjar hända", "Flickan på min gata", "Långsamt farväl" from Ingrosso's previous album En gång i tiden (del 1) and "Judy min vän".

== Charts ==
=== Weekly charts ===
Weekly chart performance for En gång i tiden (del 2)
Chart (2021)	Peak position
Swedish Albums (Sverigetopplistan)	1

=== Year-end charts ===
Year-end chart performance for En gång i tiden (del 2)
Chart	Year	Position
Swedish Albums (Sverigetopplistan)	2021	7
Swedish Albums (Sverigetopplistan)	2022	42
Swedish Albums (Sverigetopplistan)	2023	24
Swedish Albums (Sverigetopplistan)	2024	15

== Certifications ==
Region	Certification	Certified units/sales
Sweden (GLF)	Platinum	30,000^{‡}
^{‡} Sales+streaming figures based on certification alone.
