= Paradise (Ofenbach song) =

Single by Ofenbach featuring Benjamin Ingrosso

from the EP Ofenbach
- Released: 24 August 2018
- Recorded: 2018
- Length: 2:34
- Label: Ofenbach Music, Warner Music Group
- Songwriter(s): Hampus Lindvall; Janik Riegert; Josh Tapen; Dorian Lauduique; Benjamin Ingrosso; César Laurent de Rummel
- Producer(s): Ofenbach

Ofenbach singles chronology
"Party" (2018)	"Paradise" (2018)	"Rock It" (2019)

Benjamin Ingrosso singles chronology
"I Wouldn't Know" (2018)	"Paradise" (2018)	"Behave" (2018)

"Paradise" is a song by French DJ duo Ofenbach featuring vocals by Swedish singer Benjamin Ingrosso. The song was released on 24 August 2018.

== Music video ==
A music video to accompany the release of "Paradise" was directed by Alejo Restrepo and released on 28 September 2018.

== Track listing ==
Digital download
No.	Title	Length
1.	"Paradise"	2:34

Digital download – remixes
No.	Title	Length
1.	"Paradise" (Extended version)	3:52
2.	"Paradise" (Hugel remix)	3:38
3.	"Paradise" (Henri PFR remix)	4:07
4.	"Paradise" (Jen Ji's remix)	3:09
5.	"Paradise" (Quarterhead remix)	3:51
6.	"Paradise" (FDVM remix)	3:49
7.	"Paradise" (Lumberjack remix)	2:52

Digital download – acoustic
No.	Title	Length
1.	"Paradise" (Acoustic)	2:12

== Charts ==
=== Weekly charts ===
Chart (2018–19)	Peak position
Belarus Airplay (Eurofest)	21
Belgium (Ultratop 50 Wallonia)	8
CIS Airplay (TopHit)	11
Czech Republic (Rádio – Top 100)	5
France (SNEP)	36
Poland (Polish Airplay Top 100)	9
Russia Airplay (TopHit)	5
Sweden (Sverigetopplistan)	99

=== Year-end charts ===
Chart (2018)	Position
Russia Airplay (Tophit)	95

== Certifications ==
Region	Certification	Certified units/sales
France (SNEP)	Gold	100,000^{‡}
Poland (ZPAV)	Gold	25,000^{‡}
^{‡} Sales+streaming figures based on certification alone.

== Release history ==
Region	Date	Format	Label	Version
Various	24 August 2018	Digital download, streaming	Ofenbach Music, Warner Music Group	Original
Various	22 November 2018	Digital download, streaming	Ofenbach Music, Warner Music Group	Remixes
Various	14 December 2018	Digital download, streaming	Ofenbach Music, Warner Music Group	Acoustic
