= Dance You Off =

2018 single by Benjamin Ingrosso

Single by Benjamin Ingrosso

from the album Identification
- Released: 2 March 2018
- Genre: Pop
- Label: TEN
- Songwriters: Benjamin Ingrosso; Louis Schoorl; K Nita; Marco Borrero
- Producers: MAG; Schoorl

Benjamin Ingrosso singles chronology
"One More Time" (2017)	"Dance You Off" (2018)	"Tror du att han bryr sig" (2018)

Music video
- "Dance You Off" on YouTube

Eurovision Song Contest 2018 entry
- Country: Sweden
- Artist: Benjamin Ingrosso
- Language: English
- Composers: Louis Schoorl; Benjamin Ingrosso; K. Nita; Marco Borrero
- Lyricists: Schoorl; Ingrosso; K. Nita; Borrero

Finals performance
- Semi-final result: 2nd
- Semi-final points: 254
- Final result: 7th
- Final points: 274

Entry chronology
- ◄ "I Can't Go On" (2017)
- "Too Late for Love" (2019) ►

"Dance You Off" is a 2018 song by Swedish singer Benjamin Ingrosso. The song won Melodifestivalen 2018, and made it to the final from the first semifinal. It was released in February 2018. The song won Melodifestivalen and represented Sweden in the Eurovision Song Contest 2018 in Lisbon, Portugal. The song was later included on Ingrosso's debut album, Identification.

== Melodifestivalen ==
Being Ingrosso's second participation in the Swedish Eurovision selection, "Dance You Off" participated in the first semi-final of the 2018 Melodifestivalen which was held in Karlstad's Löfbergs Arena on 3 February 2018. The song was performed last at the semi-final and it directly qualified to the final as it got the most votes in the semi-final. On 10 March, during the final at the Friends Arena in Solna, Ingrosso performed the song at the eleventh position of the running order. "Dance You Off" won the selection with 114 points from the international juries and 67 points from the public vote, receiving 181 points in total.

== Eurovision Song Contest ==
"Dance You Off" was performed on 10 May 2018 in the second semi-final of Eurovision Song Contest in Lisbon, Portugal. The song made it to the Grand final, where it placed seventh with 274 points. It received the maximum 12 points from the juries of eight countries.

== Track listing ==
Digital download
No.	Title	Length
1.	"Dance You Off"	3:02

Digital download (LiTek remix)
No.	Title	Length
1.	"Dance You Off"	3:21

Digital download (Galavant remix)
No.	Title	Length
1.	"Dance You Off"	3:47

== Charts ==
=== Weekly charts ===
Chart (2018)	Peak position
France (SNEP)	78
Greece International (IFPI Greece)	65
Iceland (RÚV)	15
Poland Airplay (ZPAV)	35
Spain (Promusicae)	69
Sweden (Sverigetopplistan)	2
Scottish Singles Sales (Official Charts)	80
UK Singles Downloads (Official Charts)	61

=== Year-end charts ===
Chart (2018)	Position
Sweden (Sverigetopplistan)	35

== Certifications ==
Region	Certification	Certified units/sales
Sweden (GLF)	Platinum	8,000,000^{†}
^{†} Streaming-only figures based on certification alone.
