= Flickan på min gata =

Single by Benjamin Ingrosso

from the album En gång i tiden (del 1)
- Released: 11 January 2021
- Length: 2:55
- Label: TEN
- Songwriters: Benjamin Ingrosso; Niklas Wahlgren
- Producers: Anders Glenmark; Benjamin Ingrosso; Hampus Lindvall

Benjamin Ingrosso singles chronology
"Shampoo" (2020)	"Flickan på min gata" (2021)	"VHS" (2021)

"Flickan på min gata" is a song by Swedish singer Benjamin Ingrosso. It was released as digital download and for streaming on 11 January 2021 by TEN Music Group as the lead single from his second studio album En gång i tiden (del 1). The song peaked at number nine on the Swedish Singles Chart. The song was written by Benjamin Ingrosso and Niklas Wahlgren.

== Background ==
Ingrosso was between 12 and 13 years old when he wrote the song with his uncle Niklas Wahlgren.

== Track listing ==
Digital download
No.	Title	Length
1.	"Flickan på min gata"	2:55

== Personnel ==
Credits adapted from Tidal.

- Anders Glenmark – producer
- Benjamin Ingrosso – producer, composer, lyricist
- Hampus Lindvall – producer
- Niklas Wahlgren – composer, lyricist

== Charts ==
Chart (2021)	Peak position
Sweden (Sverigetopplistan)	9

== Certifications ==
Region	Certification	Certified units/sales
Sweden (GLF)	Gold	4,000,000^{†}
^{†} Streaming-only figures based on certification alone.
