= Silvana Imam =

Swedish rapper (born 1986)

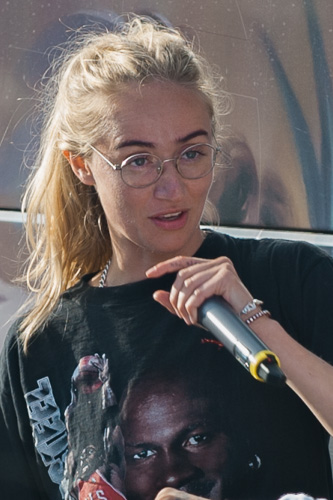
- Silvana Imam in 2015

Background information
- Born: 19 September 1986 (age 39); Plungė, Lithuania
- Genres: Hip hop
- Labels: Playground Music, Refune Music

Silvana Imam (born 19 September 1986) is a Swedish rapper. She is known for her political songs protesting racism, homophobia, and the Sweden Democrats.

== Biography ==
=== Early life ===
Imam was born in Plungė, Lithuania. Imam's mother is from the Samogitian region of Lithuania, while her father is of Syrian descent. She grew up in Plungė, Lithuania, and Stockholm. Imam studied English and psychology at Stockholm University. She is openly lesbian and was in a relationship with singer Beatrice Eli. She is a member of the hiphop collective RMH, consisting of rappers Erik "Eboi" Lundin and Cherrie.

=== Career ===
In 2012, she was nominated for Newcomer of the Year at Kingsizegalan, and in May 2013, she released her debut album called Rekviem for the record label Playground Music. In May 2014, she released the EP När du ser mig • Se dig, and, after that went on her Jag ser dig tour in Sweden during the summer of 2014.

In January 2015, Imam signed with Sebastian Ingrosso's record label, Refune Music. In February 2015, she was named Homo of the Year at the QX Gaygalan Awards. In April 2015, she released her second EP, called Jag dör för dig, and went on her second tour, called Jag är naturkraft. Imam is in a relationship with performer Beatrice Eli and in June 2015, the couple performed together in Gothenburg under the stage name of Vierge Moderne. They got the name for their duo from a poem of the Finnish poet Edith Södergran. They performed at the performance stage at Liseberg. She was a guest in the premiere episode of the discussion show Edit: Dirawi, with Gina Dirawi as presenter. In October 2015, Imam was a guest on the Aftonbladet TV show Nästa nivå, where she discussed rap music with rap artist Sebbe Staxx. In February 2015, she won the award for Best Live Act at Manifestgalan. Silvana Imam has described herself in her lyrics as the Vincent van Gogh of rap, the Liberace of rap, and the Quentin Tarantino of rap.

In October 2016, Silvana Imam was confirmed to play at the 31st edition of Eurosonic Noorderslag in Groningen, the Netherlands. On 2 July 2021, Imam and Lune will released "Vinner med hjärtat", the theme song for Sweden for the 2020 Summer Olympics. She made her acting debut in the 2022 film Dogborn, which premiered at the International Critics' Week section of the 79th Venice International Film Festival.

== Discography ==
=== Albums ===
Title	Details	Peak chart positions
Title	Details	SWE
Rekviem	Released: 20 May 2013; Label: Naturkraft; Format: CD, digital download, streaming	—
Naturkraft	Released: 25 March 2016; Label: Refune, Naturkraft; Format: CD, digital download, streaming	17
Helig Moder	Released: 15 February 2019; Label: Naturkraft; Format: CD, digital download, streaming	13
Hamlet	Released: 15 December 2023; Label: Naturkraft; Format: CD, digital download, streaming	—
Tro	Released: 31 January 2025; Label: Naturkraft; Format: CD, digital download, streaming	—
