= Benjamin Ingrosso =

Swedish singer and songwriter (born 1997)

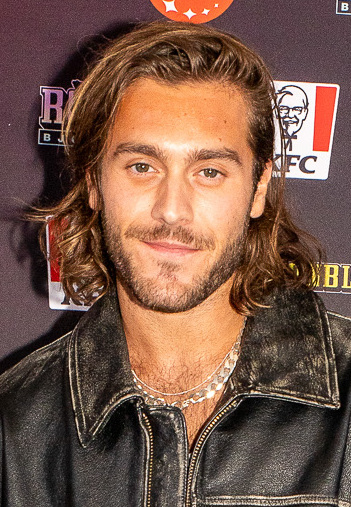
- Ingrosso in 2024
- Born: Benjamin Daniele Wahlgren Ingrosso; 14 September 1997 (age 29); Danderyd, Sweden
- Parents: Pernilla Wahlgren (mother); Emilio Ingrosso (father)
- Relatives: Bianca Ingrosso (sister); Oliver Ingrosso (brother); Sebastian Ingrosso (paternal cousin); Hans Wahlgren (maternal grandfather); Christina Schollin (maternal grandmother); Linus Wahlgren (maternal uncle); Antonio Diodato (second cousin)
- Musical career
- Genres: Pop; electropop
- Occupations: Singer, songwriter, record producer, actor
- Years active: 2005–present
- Labels: TEN; Hitco; 6&7; Universal Music Group
- Website: benjaminingrossoofficial.com

Benjamin Daniele Wahlgren Ingrosso (born 14 September 1997) is a Swedish singer, songwriter and record producer. As a child, he appeared in the leading role in several musicals, and in 2006 he won Lilla Melodifestivalen with the song "Hej Sofia". He won the celebrity dancing TV show Let's Dance 2014, and has competed twice in Melodifestivalen in 2017 and 2018 respectively. He won in 2018 and represented Sweden in the Eurovision Song Contest 2018 with the song "Dance You Off". Ingrosso has released five studio albums and hosted his own TV series, Benjamin's, on TV4.

== Early life ==
Ingrosso was born in Danderyd, to former dancer now restaurant owner Emilio Ingrosso, and singer and actress Pernilla Wahlgren. He is the younger brother of Oliver Wahlgren Ingrosso and Bianca Wahlgren Ingrosso, and older half brother of Theodor Wahlgren. He is the grandson of actors Hans Wahlgren and Christina Schollin, and nephew of actors Niclas Wahlgren and Linus Wahlgren. He is also a cousin of Swedish House Mafia band member Sebastian Ingrosso who himself is the cousin of Diodato through Sebastian's father Vito, making Benjamin his second cousin. He is of Italian descent through his father, and of Swedish and Italian descent through his mother. He is a self-taught pianist and guitarist.

== Career ==
=== 2006–2013: Lilla Melodifestivalen 2006, singing and acting ===
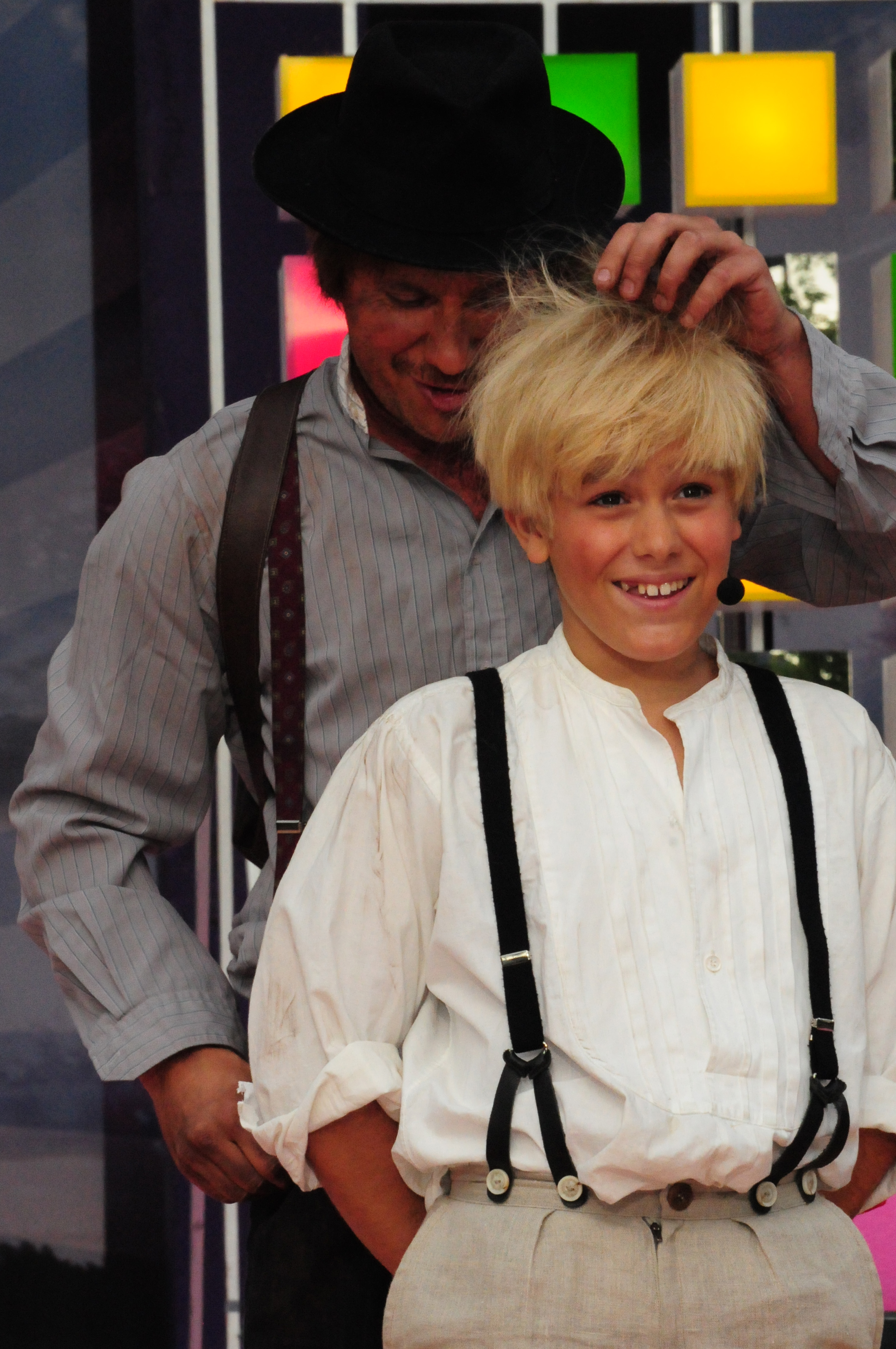
Ingrosso (right) performing on stage with Markoolio in 2009

Ingrosso has acted in several musicals and plays such as Nils Karlsson Pyssling. He won the Lilla Melodifestivalen in 2006 with the song "Hej Sofia", and he represented Sweden in MGP Nordic 2006 in Stockholm, where he placed fourth.

In 2007, he released the single "Jag är en astronaut", which his uncle Linus Wahlgren had recorded and performed in 1985. Ingrosso's version peaked at number 2 on the Swedish singles chart. The same year he participated in Allsång på Skansen along with his mother, and he also took part in the Diggiloo tour. Between 2008 and 2009, Ingrosso acted in the musical Hujeda mej vá många sånger. At the Eldsjälsgala in 2009, Ingrosso and Pernilla Wahlgren performed a medley of The Jackson 5 songs, translated into Swedish. In late 2009, he performed as Rasmus in the play Rasmus på luffen along with Markoolio.

In 2011, Ingrosso performed as lillebror in the play Karlsson på taket flyger igen at Göta Lejon in Stockholm. In February 2014, he announced that he had left the musical scene to focus entirely on music and songwriting. In October 2016, he released his first music single called "Fall in Love", which he performed at Nyhetsmorgon which was broadcast on TV4. He signed a record deal with TEN Music Group.

=== 2014–2017: Let's Dance 2014 and Melodifestivalen ===
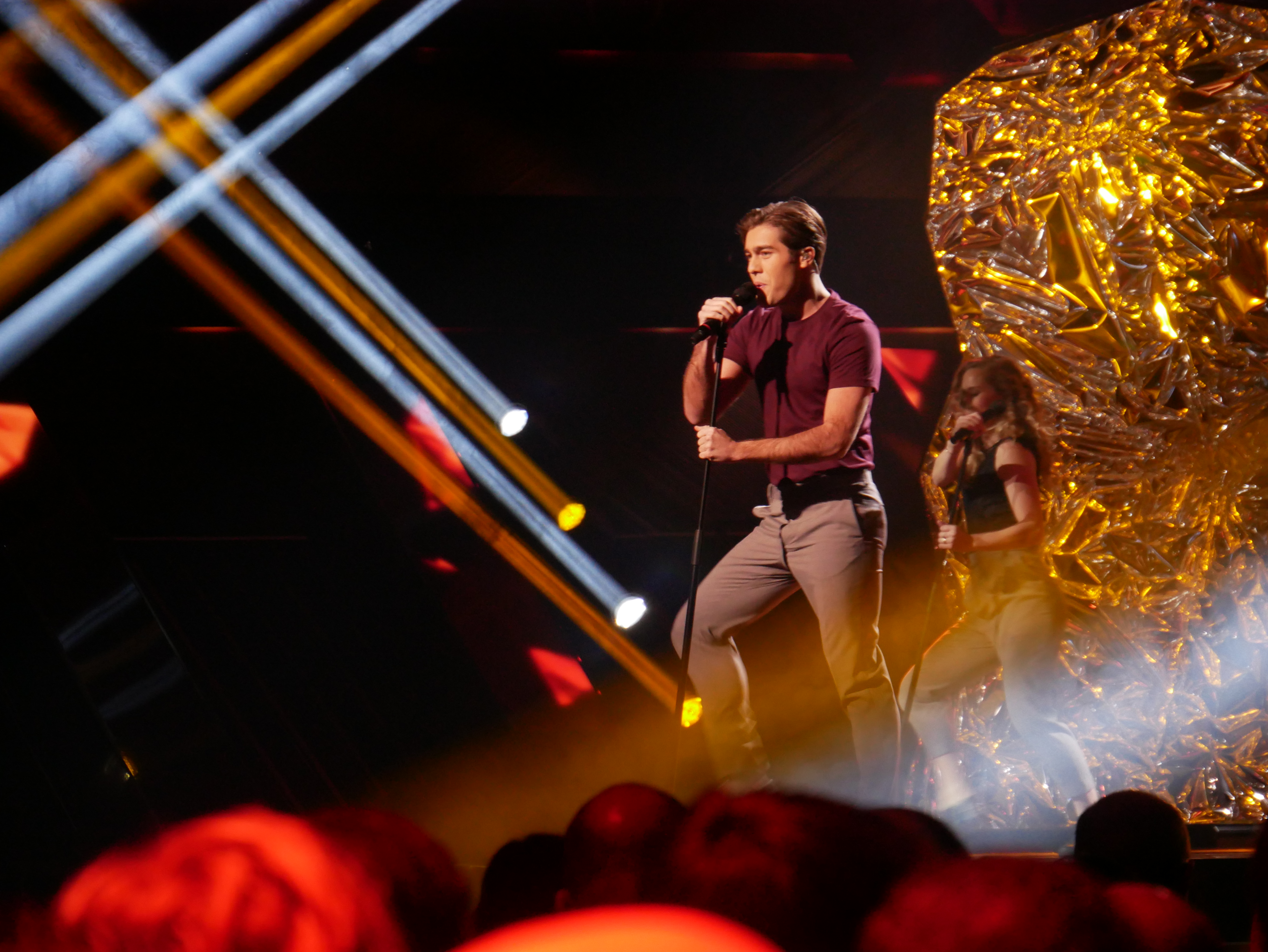
Ingrosso performing at Melodifestivalen 2017

Ingrosso won the Swedish celebrity dancing TV-series Let's Dance 2014, broadcast on TV4, alongside his professional dancing partner Sigrid Bernson. He has participated in his mother Pernilla Wahlgren's TV-series Wahlgrens värld, which is broadcast on Kanal 5 and the streaming service MAX, since 2016.

Ingrosso participated in Melodifestivalen 2017 with the song "Good Lovin'", which he co-wrote along with Louis Schoorl and Matt Pardon. He placed fifth in the final.

=== 2018–2019: Eurovision Song Contest and Identification ===
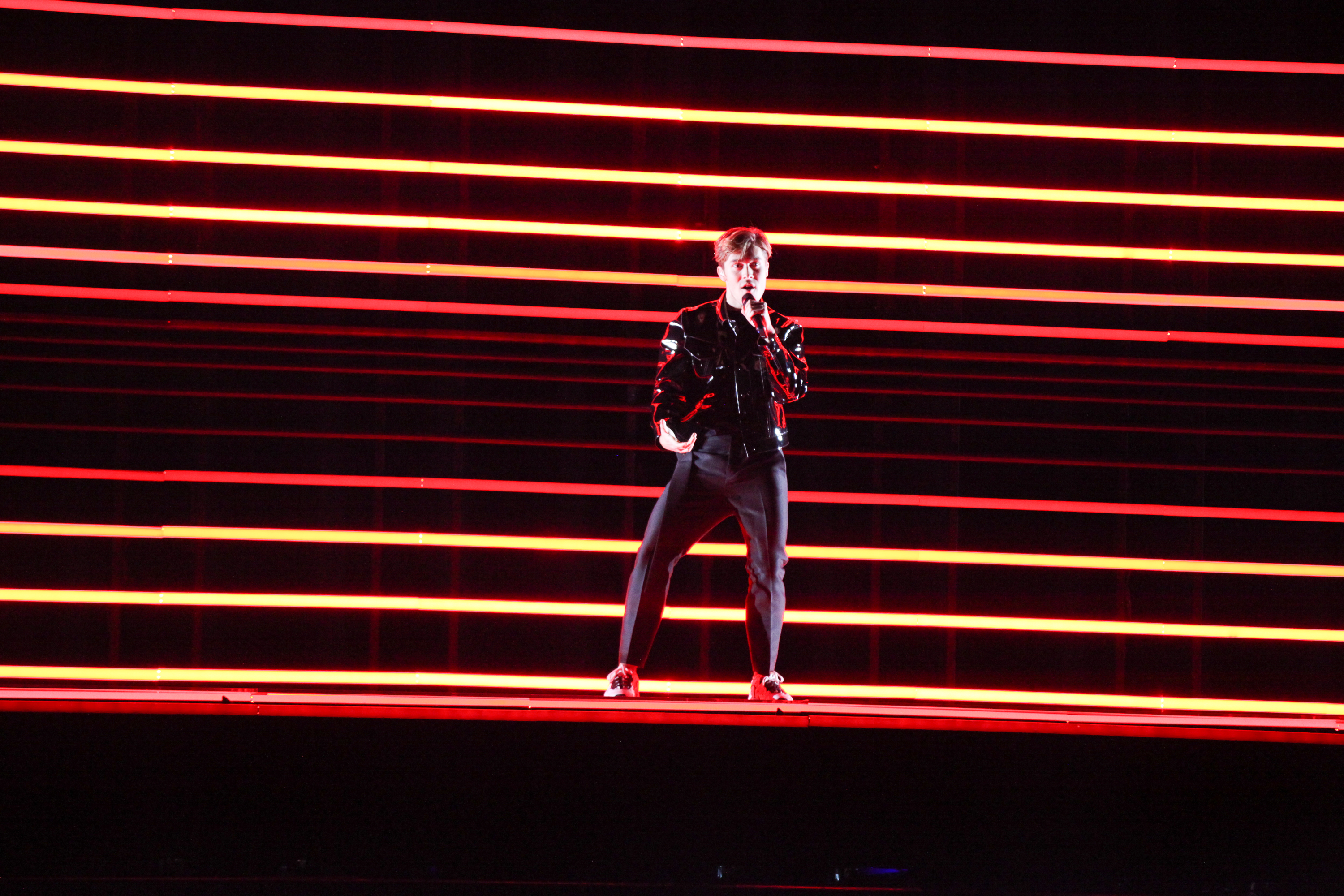
Ingrosso performing at the Eurovision Song Contest 2018.

Ingrosso participated again in Melodifestivalen 2018, with the song "Dance You Off". The song was written by Ingrosso, Louis Schoorl, and K Nita. He qualified for the final from the first semi-final and finished in first place. He represented Sweden in the Eurovision Song Contest 2018 in Lisbon, Portugal, in the second semi-final qualifying to the final. In the final he placed seventh, receiving the maximum 12 points from the juries of eight countries. Ingrosso performed his song against a backdrop of LED lights, which changed color in time to the beat of the music. He wore a black leather jacket, black jeans and white trainers.

Ingrosso released his debut album, Identification, on 28 September 2018.

=== 2020–2022: En gång i tiden and Playlist ===
Ingrosso took part in the eleventh series of Swedish reality television show, Så mycket bättre, alongside multiple fellow Swedish artists including Loreen and Tove Styrke. On 15 January 2021, he released his second studio album, En gång i tiden. The album is entirely in Swedish and marks his first full album in the language. Speaking about the album on social media, Ingrosso stated, "I love and miss singing in Swedish" and that the inspiration for the record came from his "love for Swedish pop and all of the great Swedish musicians that's been my source of inspiration since [he] was a kid". The second part of the album, En gång i tiden (del 2), was released on 16 April.

Ingrosso's fourth studio album and second English-language album, Playlist, was released on 17 June 2022.

=== 2023–present: Better Days Tour and Pink Velvet Theatre ===
In late 2023, Ingrosso announced his "Better Days Tour" with shows in Sweden and throughout Europe. In May 2024, he performed a medley of "Look Who's Laughing Now", "Kite" and "Honey Boy" as an interval act in the first semi-final of the Eurovision Song Contest 2024 in Malmö. On 25 October 2024, Ingrosso's fifth studio album, Pink Velvet Theatre, was released. The album topped the charts in Sweden upon release.

== Personal life ==
Ingrosso was in a six-year relationship with influencer Linnea Widmark; the couple broke up in March 2019.

== Discography ==
=== Studio albums ===
- Identification (2018)
- En gång i tiden (del 1) (2021)
- En gång i tiden (del 2) (2021)
- Playlist (2022)
- Pink Velvet Theatre (2024)
- Baby Don't Say That, I'm Sensitive (2027)

== Tours ==
- BxF Tour (2018-2019)
- Club Tour (2019)
- Scandinavian Tour (2019)
- Allt Det Vackra Summer Tour (2023)
- Better Days Tour (2024)
- Pink Velvet Theatre Tour (2025)
- EU Tour (2025)
- What Happens Next? Tour (2026)

== Theatre ==
- Nils Karlsson Pyssling
- Hujeda mej vá många sånger (2008–2009)
- Karlsson på taket flyger igen (2011)

== Filmography ==
Year	Title	Role	Ref.
2014	Big Hero 6	Hiro Hamada	
2021–present	Benjamin's	Presenter	
TBA	The Entertainment System Is Down	TBA	

== Awards and nominations ==
=== Grammis ===
Year	Nominee / work	Award	Result	Ref.
2019	"Dance You Off"	Song of the Year	Nominated	
2020	Identification (Deluxe)	Pop of the Year	Nominated	
2022	En gång i tiden	Pop of the Year	Nominated	
2022	Himself	Artist of the Year	Won	
2025	Himself	Artist of the Year	Won	
2025	Himself	Lyricist of the Year	Nominated	
2025	"Honey Boy"	Song of the Year	Won	
2025	Pink Velvet Theatre	Album of the Year	Won	
2025	Pink Velvet Theatre	Pop of the Year	Nominated	

=== Kristallen ===
Year	Nominee / work	Award	Result	Ref.
2022	Himself	TV Personality of the Year	Won	
2023	Himself	TV Personality of the Year	Won	

=== MTV Europe Music Awards ===
Year	Nominee / work	Award	Result	Ref.
2018	Himself	Best Swedish Act	Nominated	

=== P3 Guld ===
Year	Nominee / work	Award	Result	Ref.
2025	"Kite"	Song of the Year	Won	
2025	Pink Velvet Theatre	Album of the Year	Won	
2025	Himself	Artist of the Year	Won	
2025	Himself	Best Live Performance	Won	

=== QX Gaygalan Awards ===
Year	Nominee / work	Award	Result	Ref.
2019	"Dance You Off"	Song of the Year	Nominated	
2021	Himself	TV Star of the Year	Won	
2022	Himself	Hetero of the Year	Won	
2025	"Honey Boy"	Song of the Year	Won	

=== Rockbjörnen ===
Year	Nominee / work	Award	Result	Ref.
2018	"Dance You Off"	Swedish Song of the Year	Nominated	
2018	Himself	Male Artist of the Year	Won	
2019	Benjamin Ingrosso Fans	Fans of the Year	Nominated	
2019	Himself	Concert of the Year	Nominated	
2019	Himself	Male Artist of the Year	Won	
2021	"Allt det vackra"	Swedish Song of the Year	Won	
2021	Himself	Male Artist of the Year	Won	
2022	Benjamin Ingrosso Fans	Fans of the Year	Won	
2022	Himself	Male Artist of the Year	Won	
2022	"Smile"	Swedish Song of the Year	Nominated	
2023	Himself	Male Artist of the Year	Won	
2024	Benjamin Ingrosso Fans	Fans of the Year	Won	
2024	Himself	Male Artist of the Year	Won	

Preceded by Robin Bengtsson with "I Can't Go On"	Melodifestivalen winner 2018	Succeeded by John Lundvik with "Too Late for Love"
