= Ten Music Group =

Swedish independent record label

- Founded: 2003; 23 years ago
- Founder: Ola Håkansson
- Genre: Various
- Country of origin: Sweden
- Location: Stockholm, Sweden
- Official website: www.ten.se

Ten Music Group is a Swedish independent record label headquartered in Stockholm, Sweden. The label was founded by Ola Håkansson in 2003.

== History ==
The company was founded by Swedish singer, composer and producer, Ola Håkansson in 2003, in Stockholm, Sweden.

Håkansson originally founded Stockholm Records in 1992 with Alexander Bard as a joint venture with distributor, PolyGram. In 1998, Håkansson and Bard sold their shares in Stockholm Records to Universal Music Group, who had purchased Stockholm's distributor, PolyGram in 1995.

In 2003, the company was founded as a publishing and production company which employed ex-Stockholm Records' songwriters and producers. In 2007, Håkansson turned the company into an independent record label, publishing, songwriting, management and production house, known as a 360-degree company, drawing inspiration from the business structures of Atlantic Records, Island and Motown.

In May 2013, the company formed an alliance with Sony Music to handle select international releases for artists signed with Ten, and provide music recording and company facilities in London, Los Angeles and New York.

== Current artists ==
- Benjamin Ingrosso
- Bishara
- Elliphant
- Felix Sandman
- FO&O
- Icona Pop
- Kamferdrops
- Niki and the Dove
- Omar Rudberg
- Oscar Enestad

== Former artists ==
- Zara Larsson
- Erik Hassle

== See also ==
- Stockholm Records
- List of record labels
