= Waste My Time (Benjamin Ingrosso song) =

Single by Benjamin Ingrosso

from the album Baby Don't Say That, I'm Sensitive
- Released: 18 September 2026
- Studio: Riksmixningsverket (Stockholm)
- Genre: Pop; new wave; pop-rock
- Length: 3:30
- Label: Universal
- Songwriters: Benjamin Ingrosso; Jon Shave; Timothy Collins; John Shazam; Montgomery; Bill Maybury
- Producers: Benjamin Ingrosso; Jonathan Rado; Jon Shave; Kane Ritchotte

Benjamin Ingrosso singles chronology
"Angela" (2025)	"Waste My Time" (2026)	"Mommy's Boy" (2026)

Music video
- "Waste My Time" on YouTube

"Waste My Time" (stylized in all lowercase) is a song by Swedish singer and songwriter Benjamin Ingrosso, released on 18 September 2026, through Universal Music AB. Serving as the lead single from Ingrosso's sixth studio album Baby Don't Say That, I'm Sensitive (2026), it was written by Ingrosso, Jon Shave, Timothy Collins, John Shazam, Montgomery and Bill Maybury, and produced by Ingrosso, Shave, Jonathan Rado and Kane Ritchotte. The song was released with "Funny Feeling" as a double single.

A pop song with new wave influences, the song talks about Ingrosso being in a one-sided romantic relationship where, even though he is rejected, he still wants the other person to waste his time because he likes being with them.

"Waste My Time" received generally positive reviews from critics who thought the production was less instant than his previous material, but appreciated the more mature and personal tone of the lyrics. Commercially, the song debuted at number 9 on the Swedish singles chart.

== Background and composition ==
The song was recorded across the United States, England and Sweden, before being completed during an intensive two-week course at Benny Andersson's Riksmixningsverket studio (Stockholm). Ingrosso participated in the writing and producing process, by teaming up with previous collaborator Jon Shave, who co-wrote Ingrosso's single "Kite".

"Waste My Time" is a pop song with new wave influences, incorporating a chorus reminiscent of 2000s pop rock music. Built around a stripped-down organ riff, Ingrosso sings in a confessional and intimate style about a one-sided romantic relationship where rejection becomes something enjoyable for him. Describing the song, he said, "Being chosen and rejected over and over again does strange things to you. Even though you know how terrible you’ll feel afterwards, it only pulls you in more deeply. It becomes an addiction."

== Release and promotion ==
In 2026, Ingrosso took a break from social media before returning on Instagram in August, announcing his plans for future material. In mid-September, he teased the music video for "Waste My Time" and "Funny Feeling" in a post, before announcing the release date for 18 September, 2026.

The songs were then included on the surprise-released EP Mommy's Boy on 16 October, 2026. The same day, Ingrosso announced his sixth studio album Baby Don't Say That, I'm Sensitive which includes all the songs from the EP. The same month, "Waste My Time" entered different international radio playlists such as Finland, France and Germany.

== Critical reception ==
Upon its release, "Waste My Time" received generally positive reviews from critics who praised the maturity of the lyrics and Ingrosso's unveiling of his personal life. Markus Larsson from Aftonbladet gave the song a three out of five rating, stating, "The choruses have been more convincing in the past, but the first songs in two years are a promising mid-30s crisis." He felt that "Waste My Time" and "Funny Feeling" are a continuation of Pink Velvet Theatre (2024). Swedish website Popmuzik complimented the song, calling it "bubbly and catchy" and "charming like a romantic comedy." They praised the lyrics by saying that Ingrosso "gives an honest picture of himself and exposes his flaws to the listener."

== Commercial performance ==
"Waste My Time" debuted at number 9 on the Swedish singles chart. It also experienced significal success on the radio record chart of the country, peaking at number 2. The song peaked at number 8 on Apple Music and number 12 on Spotify in Sweden.

== Music video ==
The music video for "Waste My Time" was directed by Jacob Rangnitt, while the creative direction was handled by Ingrosso, Rangnitt and Timothy Collins. A video snippet was teased on the singer's Instagram on 14 September, 2026. It was released alongside the song on Youtube on 18 September, 2026.

The video depicts the romantic relationship between Ingrosso and his on-screen girlfriend, Swedish actress Rebecka Harper, with flashback scenes of them driving in a car, taking a stroll or swimming in a pool. Present day is shown with Ingrosso driving alone in his car at night. The narrative reflects the song’s lyrics, which describe being attracted to someone and wanting to spend time with them even when the relationship might end badly. The contrast of the relationship is represented with the couple's good times occurring during beautiful sunny days, while Ingrosso's alone time is happening at night in a darker light.

== Credits and personnel ==
Credits were adapted from Spotify.

- Benjamin Ingrosso – vocals, songwriting, producer
- Jon Shave – songwriting, producer
- Timothy Collins – songwriting
- John Shazam – songwriting
- Montgomery – songwriting
- Bill Maybury – songwriting
- Jonathan Rado – producer, organ, synthesizer , drums, percussions
- Kane Ritchotte – producer, programming, bass, drums, percussions, synthesizer
- Jacob Werner – vocal production
- Ian Gold – engineering, mixing
- Marcus Hoh – additional mixing
- Björn Engelmann – mastering

Partly recorded at Riksmixningsverket studio (Stockholm).

== Charts ==
=== Weekly charts ===
Weekly chart performance for "Waste My Time"
Chart (2026)	Peak position
Latvia Airplay (LaIPA)	18
Sweden (Sverigetopplistan)	9
Sweden Airplay (Svensktoppen)	2

== Release history ==
Release dates and formats
Region	Date	Format(s)	Label(s)	Ref.
Worldwide	18 September 2026	Digital download; streaming	Universal Music AB; EMI Nordic	
