= Nwokike =

- Gender: Male
- Language: Igbo

Origin
- Origin: Nigeria
- Meaning: Child of creation
- Region of origin: South East Nigeria

Nwokike // is an Igbo surname. It means "child of creation".

== Notable people with the name ==
- Jessica Nwokike (VanJess), Nigerian Singer
- Ivana Nwokike (Vanjess), Nigerian singer
