= Mommy's Boy =

EP by Benjamin Ingrosso
- Released: 16 October 2026
- Recorded: 2026
- Genre: Pop
- Length: 18:49
- Label: Universal
- Producers: Jonathan Rado; Benjamin Ingrosso; Hampus Lindvall; Kane Ritchotte; Wille Enblad

Benjamin Ingrosso chronology
Pink Velvet Theatre (2024)	Mommy's Boy (2026)	Baby Don't Say That, I'm Sensitive (2027)

Singles from Mommy's Boy
- 1. "Funny Feeling" Released: 18 September 2026; 2. "Waste My Time" Released: 18 September 2026; 3. "Mommy's Boy" Released: 16 October 2026

Mommy's Boy (stylized in all lowercase) is the fourth extended play (EP) by Swedish singer Benjamin Ingrosso. It was released on 16 October 2026, by Universal Music Sweden, as a surprise release. The EP features six tracks produced by Ingrosso, Jonathan Rado, Hampus Lindvall, Kane Ritchotte and Wille Enblad which will be part of Ingrosso's sixth studio album Baby Don't Say That, I'm Sensitive, set to be released on 19 March 2027.

It was preceded by the double release of the singles "Funny Feeling" and "Waste My Time" on 18 September 2026. Starting October 2026, Ingrosso will embark on the What Happens Next? Tour across Scandinavia, with several dates quickly sold out.

== Background and development ==
Benjamin Ingrosso's fifth studio album Pink Velvet Theatre was released in October 2024 by Universal Music Sweden to commercial and critical success in Scandinavia, topping the Swedish album charts. In 2025, Ingrosso toured North America with the Pink Velvet Theater Tour and performed at several European festivals over the summer, such as PinkPop, Ruisrock and Lollapalooza. Following disappointing ticket sales for his American tour, Ingrosso stated that it took a lot on his mental health and that he worked on his self-esteem to accept that he may not be successful everywhere, but "he is happy to be big in Sweden."

Ingrosso spent the majority of 2026 working on the EP across Sweden, England and the United States, partly at Benny Andersson's studio Riksmixningsverket in Stockholm. In October 2026, Ingrosso signed a global publishing deal with Warner Chappell Music to help him take his music to new markets internationally.

== Critical reception ==
Upon its release, Mommy's Boy received generally positive reactions. Swedish website Popmusik praised the lyrics of the EP, stating, "Behind the charming and self-confident pop star is a person who doubts, seeks confirmation and sometimes makes the same mistakes [...] And that is precisely where the new songs find their strength." They complimented Ingrosso's songwriting, who they thought "has a knack for making big emotions feel immediate without losing the sense of melody."

== Track listing ==
Mommy's Boy track listing
No.	Title	Writer(s)	Producer(s)	Length
1.	"Mommy's Boy"	Benjamin Ingrosso; Hampus Lindvall; Montgomery; John Shazam; Timothy Collins	Ingrosso; Jonathan Rado; Lindvall; Kane Ritchotte	2:52
2.	"Waste My Time"	Ingrosso; Collins; Jon Shave; Shazam; Bill Maybury; Montgomery	Ingrosso; Rado; Ritchotte	3:32
3.	"Cliché"	Ingrosso; Rado; Ritchotte; Shazam; David Stewart; Boy Matthews; Jessica Agombar	Ingrosso; Rado; Ritchotte	3:17
4.	"Nice to Meet Ya"	Ingrosso; Collins; Shazam; Mattias Bylund; Sylvester Sivertsen; Skyler Stonestreet	Ingrosso; Rado; Ritchotte	3:13
5.	"Funny Feeling"	Ingrosso; Shazam; Montgomery; Collins; Stewart; Pablo Bowman	Ingrosso; Rado; Ritchotte	3:14
6.	"Deep Diver"	Ingrosso; Collins; Shazam; Jacob Werner; Gabe Yaron	Ingrosso; Rado; Ritchotte; Will Enblad	2:41
Total length:				18:49

== Charts ==
Chart performance for Mommy's Boy
Chart (2026)	Peak position
Swedish Albums (Sverigetopplistan)	20

== Release history ==
Release dates and formats
Region	Date	Format(s)	Label(s)	Ref.
Various	16 October 2026	Digital download; streaming	Universal; EMI	
