= Voidz (artist) =

Voidz is a Toronto-based digital and mixed reality artist known for creating videos that combine surreal digital animation with video footage of urban environments, and for projection art.

== Career ==
Voidz started posting digital animations to Instagram in 2018, combining real footage with digital animation to create surreal reinterpretations of Toronto streetscapes and landmarks. An early works was a digitally altered reinterpretation of Toronto's "Hooker Harvey's", which received coverage in local media. Other videos show outdoor city spaces where a sinkhole appears in the middle of an intersection, skyscrapers start dancing or sculptures spin.

Voidz collaborated with the musician Drake on a video that shows Drake on a basketball court, surrounded by floating, digitally animated basketballs as he shoots a hoop. His work on FKJ and Masego's Tadow 5th anniversary NFT project combined interactive digital art with a visual representation of the music-making process. In addition to his collaborations with musicians, Voidz has contributed to a group art exhibit hosted by Intel.

In 2023, Voidz produced and curated an official Nuit Blanche Toronto exhibition, at IDFK gallery, titled A Void: Meditations on a Boring Dystopia.
