= Pure Soul =

Pure Soul may refer to:

- Pure Soul (group), an American R&B girl group
- Pure Soul (album), a 1998 album by Glay

== See also ==
- "Pure Souls", a song by Kanye West
