= Shenseea =

Jamaican singer (born 1996)

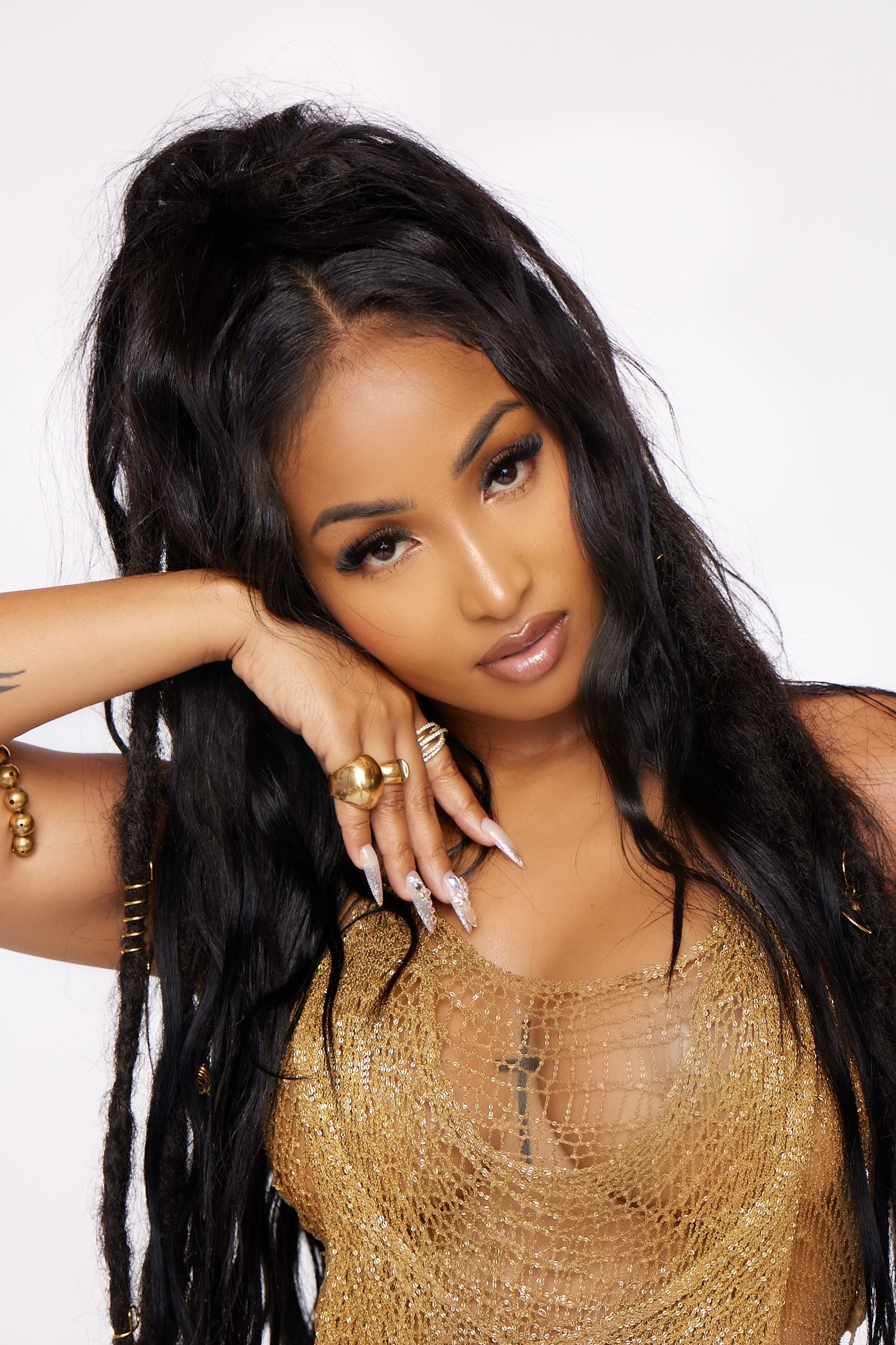
- Shenseea in 2023
- Born: Chinsea Linda Lee; 1 October 1996 (age 30); Mandeville, Jamaica
- Education: Mona High School
- Occupations: Singer; songwriter; dancer
- Years active: 2016–present
- Children: 1
- Mother: Castilyn Eleanor Williams
- Musical career
- Origin: Kingston, Jamaica
- Genres: Dancehall; hip-hop; pop; reggae
- Instrument: Vocals
- Labels: Romeich; Chimney; Rich Immigrants; Columbia; Interscope

Chinsea Linda Lee (born 1 October 1996), known professionally as Shenseea (/ʃɛnˈsiːə/), is a Jamaican singer. She is best known for her guest appearance alongside Roddy Ricch on Kanye West's 2021 song "Pure Souls," which entered the Billboard Hot 100. Through its parent album Donda, she was nominated as a featured artist for Album of the Year at the 64th Annual Grammy Awards. She is credited with widening the audience for the dancehall scene.

Shenseea signed with Interscope Records to release her debut studio album Alpha (2022), which peaked at number two on the Top Reggae Albums chart. Her second album, Never Gets Late Here (2024), was nominated for the Grammy Award for Best Reggae Album. Her other accolades include two MOBO Awards.

== Early life and education ==
Lee was born in Mandeville to a black Jamaican mother and a South Korean father, from whom she is estranged. She graduated from Mona High School and attended Excelsior Community College (Exed) in Kingston, where she studied Entertainment Management before dropping out due to financial difficulties. She aspired to become a singer at a young age.

== Career ==
After spending a few years as an aspiring artist, Shenseea was signed by the music label Rockstar. She gained recognition after remixing the well-known Vybz Kartel's song "Loodi" and performing on a side stage at Reggae Sumfest in 2015. In 2017, she performed on Reggae Sumfest's main stage. As her notoriety grew, she toured internationally. In 2016, she won "Young Hot and Hype Artist" at the Youth View Awards; Break Out Celebrity of 2016, and Collaboration of The Year for her song "Loodi" with Vybz Kartel. In addition to dancehall music she has shown skills in freestyling as a rapper. She teamed up with Sean Paul for the 2017 single "Rolling" and on the leg of his 2017 European tour.

In 2018, she was featured on Christina Aguilera's album Liberation, on the song "Right Moves". Vybz Kartel and Shenseea then collaborated on the song "Secret (Remix)" in October 2018.

In 2019, she signed with Interscope records and released the hip-hop/dancehall track "Blessed" featuring American artist Tyga, which accumulated over 58 million views on YouTube by April 2022. In January 2020, she collaborated with Jamaican record producer Rvssian on a single titled "IDKW" which also featured American rappers Swae Lee and Young Thug. That same year, Shenseea appeared on Masego's album Studying Abroad, and Major Lazer's Music Is the Weapon. Released on 28 August 2020 as an album track and later on 23 October as a single, her collaboration with Tarrus Riley and Rvssian "Lighter" proved to be a huge success in her native country Jamaica and the rest of the Caribbean after a singing challenge started by Shenseea went viral becoming one of her most successful singles and garnering over 100 million views on YouTube.

In 2021, Shenseea collaborated with Kanye West on his album Donda, appearing on the songs "Pure Souls" with Roddy Ricch and "Ok Ok pt 2" with Rooga. She has also appeared onstage during West's Chicago event for Donda. For her collaborations on West's album, Shenseea received an Album of the Year nomination, as a featured artist, at the 2022 64th Grammy Awards, marking her first Grammy nomination. In 2021, Shenseea also signed with Wassim "Sal" Slaiby, aka Salxo, who also manages the Weeknd and Doja Cat. She won Best Reggae Act at the 2021 MOBO Awards.

In 2022, Shenseea's 2018 song "Pon Mi" went viral on the video sharing platform TikTok. Shenseea was also nominated for a MTV Music Video Award in 2022, and also presented at the 2023 MTV Video Music Awards the following year. Later in 2023, she performed at the 22nd Coachella Valley Music and Arts Festival in April, and was also part of the Tropical Takeover Tour with Sean Paul and Myke Towers. The same year she received an NAACP Image Award for Outstanding International Song for her work on the song "Diana" by Fireboy DML. In late 2023, Shenseea had made a work on her song " Waistline" and on 26 January 2024 released "Hit and Run" featuring Masicka and Di Genius. "Hit and Run" emerged as one of Shenseea's biggest hits in her native country Jamaica as well as multiple other countries in the Caribbean with the music video garnering over 60 million views on YouTube.

Shenseea's album Never Gets Late Here received a 2025 Grammy Awards nomination for Best Reggae Album.

On July 11, 2026, she became the first Jamaican female artist to reach #1 on Billboard’s Latin Airplay chart, due to the song “Echo (FIFA World Cup 2026)”, which she and Daddy Yankee collaborated on. Later that year, she became the first female dancehall artist to be nominated for the Billboard Latin Music Awards, being nominated for Crossover Artist of the Year.

=== Endorsements ===
Alongside her singing career, she holds multiple corporate sponsorship deals with companies such as Telecom, Firm Flow, Boom and a Pepsi-Cola JA sponsorship.

== Personal life ==
Shenseea resides in both Jamaica and the United States. She has one son.

== Discography ==
=== Studio albums ===
List of studio albums, with selected details and chart positions
Title	Details	Peak chart positions	
Title	Details	US Reggae	US Heat.
Alpha	Released: 11 March 2022; Label: Rich Immigrants, Interscope; Formats: Digital download, streaming	2	3
Never Gets Late Here	Released: 24 May 2024; Label: Rich Immigrants, Interscope; Formats: Digital download, streaming, CD	4	—
"—" denotes a recording that did not chart or was not released in that territory.

=== Extended plays ===
- Catalyst (2026)

=== Singles ===
==== As lead artist ====
List of charted singles, with year and chart positions
Title	Year	Peak chart positions						Certifications	Album
Title	Year	JAM Air.	CAN	NZ Hot	SUR	UK	US	Certifications	Album
"Jiggle Jiggle"	2016	*	—	—	—	—	—		Non-album singles
"Rock The Floor" (featuring Ding Dong)	2016	*	—	—	—	—	—		Non-album singles
"Reverse"	2017	*	—	—	—	—	—		Non-album singles
"Loodi" (with Vybz Kartel)	2017	*	—	—	—	—	—		Non-album singles
"Happy Juk"	2017	*	—	—	—	—	—		Non-album singles
"Rude Gyal"	2017	*	—	—	—	—	—		Non-album singles
"Chatterbox"	2017	*	—	—	—	—	—		Non-album singles
"Solo"	2018	*	—	—	—	—	—		Non-album singles
"I Can" (featuring Dani Alo)	2018	*	—	—	—	—	—		Non-album singles
"Body Good"	2018	*	—	—	—	—	—		Non-album singles
"Pon Mi" (with Dunw3ll)	2018	*	—	—	—	—	—		Non-album singles
"Shen Yeng Anthem"	2018	*	—	—	—	—	—	BPI: Silver	Non-album singles
"Hard Drive" (with Konshens and Rvssian)	2018	*	—	—	—	—	—		Non-album singles
"Show Off" (with Azaryah and Samantha J)	2018	*	—	—	—	—	—		Non-album singles
"You & I" (featuring Wayne Wonder)	2018	*	—	—	—	—	—		Non-album singles
"Instruction"	2018	*	—	—	—	—	—		Non-album singles
"Position"	2018	*	—	—	—	—	—		Bashment Time Riddim
"Trending Gyal"	2018	*	—	—	—	—	—		Non-album singles
"Sticks & Stones"	2018	*	—	—	—	—	—		Non-album singles
"Sinners Prayer"	2019	*	—	—	—	—	—		Non-album singles
"Replaceable"	2019	*	—	—	—	—	—		Non-album singles
"Undo" (with Naughty Boy and Calum Scott)	2019	*	—	—	—	—	—		Non-album singles
"Streets Nuh Right"	2019	*	—	—	—	—	—		Non-album singles
"Foreplay"	2019	*	—	—	—	—	—	BPI: Silver; RMNZ: Gold	Non-album singles
"Blessed" (with Tyga)	2019	*	—	—	—	—	—		Alpha
"IDKW" (with Rvssian, Swae Lee and Young Thug)	2020	*	—	—	—	—	—		Non-album singles
"Potential Man"	2020	*	—	—	—	—	—		Non-album singles
"The Sidechick Song"	2020	*	—	—	—	—	—		Non-album singles
"Wasabi"	2020	*	—	—	—	—	—		Non-album singles
"Good Comfort" (with DJ Frass)	2020	*	—	—	—	—	—		Non-album singles
"Sure Sure"	2020	*	—	—	—	—	—		Non-album singles
"Bad Alone"	2020	*	—	—	—	—	—		Non-album singles
"Upset"	2020	*	—	—	—	—	—		Non-album singles
"Run Run"	2021	*	—	—	—	—	—		Non-album singles
"Be Good"	2021	*	—	—	—	—	—		Non-album singles
"You’re The One I Love" (with Rvssian)	2021	*	—	—	—	—	—		Non-album singles
"Dolly"	2022	*	—	—	—	—	—		Non-album singles
"Lick" (with Megan Thee Stallion)	2022	*	—	26	—	—	— (Note: "Lick" did not enter the Billboard Hot 100, but peaked at number 20 on the Bubbling Under Hot 100 chart.)		Alpha
"R U That" (featuring 21 Savage)	2022	*	—	—	—	—	—		Alpha
"Deserve It"	2022	*	—	—	—	—	—		Alpha
"Rain" (with Skillibeng)	2022	*	—	—	—	—	—		Non-album single
"Obsessed" (with Calvin Harris and Charlie Puth)	2022	*	76	7	—	71	—		Funk Wav Bounces Vol. 2
"Locked Up Freestyle"	2023	*	—	—	—	—	—		Non-album singles
"Curious"	2023	*	—	—	—	—	—		Non-album singles
"Sold Out"	2023	*	—	—	—	—	—		Non-album singles
"Talk Truth"	2023	*	—	—	—	—	—		Non-album singles
"My Bad" (with The Chainsmokers)	2023	*	—	33	8	—	—		Summertime Friends
"Waistline"	2023	*	—	—	—	—	—		Non-album singles
"Beama" (featuring Lola Brooke)	2023	*	—	—	—	—	—		Non-album singles
"Hit & Run" (solo or featuring Masicka and Di Genius)	2024	*	—	—	2	—	—		Never Gets Late Here
"Die for You"	2024	*	—	—	—	—	—		Never Gets Late Here
"Neva Neva"	2024	*	—	—	35	—	—		Never Gets Late Here
"Flava" (with Coi Leray)	2024	*	—	—	—	—	—		Never Gets Late Here
"Work Me Out" (with Wizkid)	2024	*	—	—	—	—	—		Never Gets Late Here
"Dating Szn"	2024	—	—	11	20	—	—		Non-album singles
"Puni Police"	2024	—	—	–	–	—	—		Non-album singles
"Shake It to the Max (Fly)" (Remix) (with Moliy, Silent Addy and Skillibeng)	2025	6	24	—	2	12	44	IFPI Greece: Gold; RIAA: Gold; BPI: Platinum; RMNZ: Gold	Baddies <3 Moliy
"Tip" (Remix) (with Ayetian, Nvtzz and DJ Mac)	2025	—	—	—	—	—	—		Non-album singles
"Aguita e Coco" (with Flamma)	2025	—	—	—	—	—	—		Non-album singles
"Self Love" (with Rvssian)	2025	—	—	—	—	—	—		Non-album singles
"Boss Up"	2025	—	—	21	12	—	—		Non-album singles
"Time for Me"	2026	—	—	—	10	—	—		Non-album singles
"Morocco" (Remix) (with Joshua Baraka and Axon)	2026	—	—	—	—	—	—		Non-album singles
"Panic" (with Vybz Kartel)	2026	—	—	—	3	—	—		God and Time
"Talk to Me Nuh" (with Rvssian and Vybz Kartel)	2026	5	—	—	2	—	—		Catalyst
"Echo" (with Daddy Yankee)	2026	—	—	—	—	—	—		FIFA World Cup 2026 Official Album
"My Turn" (with Valiant and Rvssian)	2026	—	—	—	—	—	—		Non-album singles
"Brucksweat"	2026	—	—	—	—	—	—		Non-album singles
"Distant Lover" (with Jihyo)	2026	—	—	—	—	—	—		Non-album singles
"Tightness" (with DJ Frass)	2026	—	—	—	—	—	—		Non-album singles
"Vulnerability"	2026	—	—	—	—	—	—		Catalyst
"—" denotes a recording that did not chart or was not released in that territory. "*" denotes that the chart did not exist at that time.

==== As featured artist ====
Title	Year	Peak chart positions										Certifications	Album
Title	Year	JAM Air.	BLR Air.	FRA	KAZ Air.	LAT Air.	LTU Air.	POL Air.	RUS Air.	SWE	UK Down.	Certifications	Album
"Best Nana" (Kosa featuring Shenseea and Konshens)	2017	*	—	—	—	—	—	—	—	—	—		Non-album singles
"Pon U Ruff" (Stony featuring Shenseea)	2017	*	—	—	—	—	—	—	—	—	—		Non-album singles
"Run This Town" (OFFAIAH featuring Shenseea)	2017	*	—	—	—	—	—	—	—	—	—		Non-album singles
"Waistline Ting" (Mash Up International featuring Shenseea)	2017	*	—	—	—	—	—	—	—	—	—		Non-album singles
"Baddish" (Nailah Blackman featuring Shenseea)	2017	*	—	—	—	—	—	—	—	—	—		Non-album singles
"Rolling" (Sean Paul featuring Shenseea)	2017	*	—	—	—	—	—	—	—	—	—		Non-album singles
"Parking Spot" (Cadenza featuring Shenseea and Yxng Bane)	2017	*	—	—	—	—	—	—	—	—	—		Non-album singles
"Bridgets & Desert" (Tommy Lee Sparta featuring Shenseea)	2017	*	—	—	—	—	—	—	—	—	—		Non-album singles
"Big Bad Soca" (Remix) (Bunji Garlin featuring Shenseea)	2018	*	—	—	—	—	—	—	—	—	—		Non-album singles
"Belong with Me" (Gold Up featuring Shenseea)	2018	*	—	—	—	—	—	—	—	—	—		Prelude
"The Way I Move" (Shotta Wale featuring Shenseea)	2018	*	—	—	—	—	—	—	—	—	—		Non-album singles
"Rude Girl Ride" (Howard D and ZJ Dymond featuring Shenseea)	2018	*	—	—	—	—	—	—	—	—	—		Non-album singles
"Secret (Refix)" (Vybz Kartel featuring Shenseea)	2018	*	—	—	—	—	—	—	—	—	—		Non-album singles
"Right Moves" (Christina Aguilera featuring Shenseea, Keida)	2018	*	—	—	—	—	—	—	—	—	—		Liberation
"We Ready (Champion Girl)" (Nailah Blackman featuring Shenseea)	2018	*	—	—	—	—	—	—	—	—	—		Non-album singles
"Close to Me" (Kes featuring Shenseea)	2019	*	—	—	—	—	—	—	—	—	—		Non-album singles
"Frezza" (Tessellated featuring Shenseea and Zac Jone$)	2019	*	—	—	—	—	—	—	—	—	—		Non-album singles
"Clout Chaser" (Jin Gates featuring Shenseea)	2019	*	—	—	—	—	—	—	—	—	—		Non-album singles
"Island Ting" (TheFreshMen featuring Shenseea)	2019	*	—	—	—	—	—	—	—	—	—		Non-album singles
"Silver Tongue Devil" (Masego featuring Shenseea)	2020	*	—	—	—	—	—	—	—	—	—		Studying Abroad
"Lighter" (Tarrus Riley featuring Shenseea, Rvssian)	2020	*	—	—	—	—	—	—	—	—	—		Non-album singles
"Beat Box" (Freestyle) (SpotemGottem featuring Shenseea)	2021	*	—	—	—	—	—	—	—	—	—		Non-album singles
"No Limit" (Moyann featuring Shenseea)	2021	*	—	—	—	—	—	—	—	—	—		Sun Roof Riddim
"Get Along" (Lourdiz featuring Shenseea)	2021	*	—	—	—	—	—	—	—	—	—		Non-album single
"Light My Fire" (Sean Paul featuring Gwen Stefani and Shenseea)	2022	*	—	—	—	—	—	—	—	—	—		Scorcha
"Waiting For You" (Demarco featuring Shenseea)	2024	*	—	—	—	—	—	—	—	—	—		Non-album single
"Honey Boy" (Purple Disco Machine, Benjamin Ingrosso featuring Nile Rodgers and Shenseea)	2024	*	3	—	6	9	2	6	1	2	42	ZPAV: Gold	Paradise and Pink Velvet Theatre
"V.I.P" (DJ Mac featuring Shenseea)	2025	—	—	—	—	—	—	—	—	—	—		Ups & Downs
"I'll Be Fire" (Nasri featuring Shenseea)	2025	—	—	—	—	—	—	—	—	—	—		Non-album single
"Sugar Sweet" (Mariah Carey featuring Shenseea and Kehlani)	2025	—	—	—	—	—	—	—	—	—	—		Here for It All
"What Do I Know? (Just A Girl)" (Nora Fatehi featuring Shenseea)	2025	—	—	—	—	—	—	—	—	—	—		Non-album single
"Dis-moi" (Aya Nakamura featuring Shenseea)	2025	—	—	95	—	—	—	—	—	—	—		Destinée
"Goddess" (Protoje featuring Shenseea)	2026	5	—	—	—	—	—	—	—	—	—		The Art of Acceptance
"Spend Dat" (International Remix) (Yung Miami featuring Shenseea, Davido and Vybz Kartel)	2026	—	—	—	—	—	—	—	—	—	—		Watch Dis!
"—" denotes a recording that did not chart or was not released in that territory. "*" denotes that the chart did not exist at that time.

=== Promotional singles ===
List of promotional singles
Title	Year	Peak chart positions	Album
Title	Year	SUR	Album
"You Lie"	2017	—	Non-album singles
"Tell Me" (with jahmiel)	2017	—	Non-album singles
"Topic of Discussion (anonymous)"	2017	—	Non-album singles
"Subrosa (Come Closer)"	2018	—	Non-album singles
"Love I Got For U"	2018	—	Non-album singles
"Wickedest Time"	2018	—	Non-album singles
"Bum Like Ball"	2018	—	Non-album singles
"Temptation Overdrive"	2019	—	Non-album singles
"Best Life"	2019	—	Non-album singles
"Trick'a Treat"	2019	—	Non-album singles
"Limited Edition"	2019	—	Non-album singles
"Bad Habit"	2020	—	Non-album singles
"Hallelujah"	2022	29	Non-album singles
"Dolla"	2024	—	Never Gets Late Here
"—" denotes a recording that did not chart or was not released in that territory.

=== Other charted songs ===
List of other charted songs, with selected chart positions
Title	Year	Peak chart positions	Album
Title	Year	SUR	Album
"Can't Anymore"	2022	38	Alpha
"NaNa"	2024	4	Never Gets Late Here

== Filmography ==
Television
Year	Title	Role	Notes
2024	Baddies Caribbean Auditions	Herself	Guest judge

== Awards and nominations ==
Year	Award	Category	Series/album	Result	Ref.
2020	MOBO Award	Best International Act	Herself	Nominated	
2021	MOBO Award	Best Reggae Act	Herself	Won	
2022	Grammy Award	Album of the Year	Donda	Nominated	
2022	MOBO Award	Best Caribbean Music Act	Herself	Nominated	
2022	MTV Video Music Award	Push Performance of The Year	"R U That"	Nominated	
2023	NAACP Image Awards	Outstanding International Song	"Diana" with Fireboy DML	Nominated	
2025	Grammy Awards	Best Reggae Album	Never Gets Late Here	Nominated	
2025	MOBO Awards	Best Caribbean Music Act	Herself	Won	
