= Baby Don't Say That, I'm Sensitive =

Studio album by Benjamin Ingrosso
- Released: 19 March 2027
- Recorded: 2026
- Genre: Pop
- Label: Universal
- Producers: Jonathan Rado; Benjamin Ingrosso; Hampus Lindvall; Kane Ritchotte; Wille Enblad

Benjamin Ingrosso chronology
Mommy's Boy (2026)	Baby Don't Say That, I'm Sensitive (2027)

Singles from Baby Don't Say That, I'm Sensitive
- 1. "Funny Feeling" Released: 18 September 2026; 2. "Waste My Time" Released: 18 September 2026; 3. "Mommy's Boy" Released: 16 October 2026

Baby Don't Say That, I'm Sensitive (stylized in all lowercase) is the sixth studio album by Swedish singer Benjamin Ingrosso. It will be released on 19 March 2027, by EMI Nordic. The album comes after Ingrosso's fourth EP, Mommy's Boy, which was released in 2026. The six songs from the EP make up the first half of the album. It was produced by Jonathan Rado, Hampus Lindvall, Kane Ritchotte and Wille Enblad.

A pop album with new wave and indie influences from the 1980s, Baby Don't Say That, I'm Sensitive explores themes of romance, self-esteem and confidence, with Ingrosso trying to understand himself and why he keeps sabotaging his personal relationships. The lyrics touches on the singer's flaws and struggles with a humorous tone. Many songs from the album were produced with professional musicians such as Pino Palladino and Greg Phillinganes.

Three singles have been released from Baby Don't Say That, I'm Sensitive. "Waste My Time" and "Funny Feeling" were released as a double single to launch the era on 18 September, and "Mommy's Boy" was released on 16 October. Ingrosso will support the album with the What Happens Next? Tour across Scandinavia, starting October 2026.

== Background and development ==
After the release of his chart-topping album Pink Velvet Theatre in 2024, Ingrosso spent the following year touring North America and Europe. After low tickets sales for his Pink Velvet Theatre Tour in America, he admitted that he struggled with his mental health, making him realize that he was fine with being big only in Sweden. This inspired him for his next record, writing songs about self-esteem and confidence, showing another side of himself as a person instead of a performer. Several songs from the project draw inspiration from his own personal life, which allowed him to be more outspoken in the lyrics, as he explained, "I sing a lot about sex on this record, precisely because I was in a relationship that was the most passionate I've ever been in."

== Release and promotion ==
After a brief social media break, Ingrosso returned to Instagram on 7 August 2026, to announce his return to music. On 14 September 2026, he teased the release of a new single with a snippet of the music video for "Funny Feeling" on the platform. The following day, he shared another snippet, for the "Waste My Time" music video, before announcing the release of the two songs for 18 September 2026.

On 8 October 2026, Ingrosso teased the song "Mommy's Boy" before releasing it with its music video and the EP of the same name by surprise on 16 October 2026. The same day, he officially announced Baby Don't Say That, I'm Sensitive and its release date, alongside a Spotify pre-save link revealing the track listing.

== Track listing ==
Baby Don't Say That, I'm Sensitive track listing
No.	Title	Writer(s)	Producer(s)	Length
1.	"Mommy's Boy"	Benjamin Ingrosso; Hampus Lindvall; Montgomery; John Shazam; Timothy Collins	Ingrosso; Jonathan Rado; Lindvall; Kane Ritchotte	2:52
2.	"Waste My Time"	Ingrosso; Collins; Jon Shave; Shazam; Bill Maybury	Ingrosso; Rado; Ritchotte	3:32
3.	"What Girls Want"
4.	"Cliché"	Ingrosso; Rado; Ritchotte; Shazam; David Stewart; Boy Matthews; Jessica Agombar	Ingrosso; Rado; Ritchotte	3:17
5.	"Blue Jeans and Strawberries"
6.	"Nice to Meet Ya"	Ingrosso; Collins; Shazam; Mattias Bylund; Sylvester Sivertsen; Skyler Stonestreet	Ingrosso; Rado; Ritchotte	3:13
7.	"Funny Feeling"	Ingrosso; Shazam; Montgomery; Collins; Stewart; Pablo Bowman	Ingrosso; Rado; Ritchotte	3:14
8.	"Crazy Stupid"
9.	"Deep Diver"	Ingrosso; Collins; Shazam; Jacob Werner; Gabe Yaron	Ingrosso; Rado; Ritchotte; Will Enblad	2:41
10.	"Flightmode"
11.	"Walk Out of Heaven"
12.	"End of the World"
13.	"Go Down"

== Release history ==
Release dates and formats
Region	Date	Format(s)	Label(s)	Ref.
Various	19 March 2027	Streaming	Universal; EMI	
