= Silk Canvas =

Studio album by VanJess
- Released: July 27, 2018
- Recorded: 2017–18
- Genre: R&B; electronic
- Length: 52:19
- Label: Self-released; Keep Cool, RCA (Remix Edition)
- Producer: Jay "Kurzweil" Oyebadejo; Da-P; IAMNOBODI; Chloe Martini; DikC; Ogee Handz; Dare House; Lophiile; Skyler Acord; KAYTRANADA; Louie Lastic; Scribz Riley; DrewsThatDude; Huck; Fortune

VanJess chronology
Silk Canvas (2018)	Homegrown (2021)

Silk Canvas is the only studio album by Nigerian-American R&B duo VanJess. The album was self-released on July 27, 2018 by the duo, who spent almost two years working on the album. On November 8, 2019, the duo released Silk Canvas (The Remixes) including features from Ari Lennox, Bas, Saba, Xavier Omär, and more.

The album contains features from Masego, GoldLink, Berhana, Leikeli47, and Little Simz. The production came from Jay "Kurzweil" Oyebadejo, IAMNOBODI, and KAYTRANADA, among others.

== Background ==
The album was influenced by the duo's Nigerian heritage.

== Critical reception ==
Silk Canvas received positive reviews from music critics. Pitchfork praised the album giving it a 7.7 out of 10, saying: "the sisters wield enough magic to make Silk Canvas a success: a surefooted proclamation of sensuality, musicality, and sisterly love that can hold its own with the best of new-wave R&B." The author also talked about the two singers saying: "Their sensual, confident, and, at its smoky best, near-perfect R&B is the clear work not only of years of practice, but a singular bond. They know how to play off one another. Ivana, with a deep, rounded voice that can cut across a song like a thunderclap, usually sings lead, while Jessica, whose lighter, scratchier voice recalls TLC’s T-Boz, injects personality and flair. When they’re in sync, they seamlessly share verses with a hairflip and a sultry smirk."

== Track listing ==
No.	Title	Writer(s)	Producer(s)	Length
1.	"My Love"	Ivana Nwokike; Jessica Nwokike; Pharenz Abellard	Jay "Kurzweil" Oyebadejo, Da-P	3:46
2.	"Control Me"	I. Nwokike; J. Nwokike; John Chigbue	IAMNOBODI	3:33
3.	"Touch the Floor" (featuring Masego)	I. Nwokike; J. Nwokike; Micah Davis; Ali Gabir Oussama; Sedik Boudif; Chloe Martini; Jay "Kurzweil" Oyebadejo	Chloe Martini, DikC, Ogee Handz, Jay "Kurzweil" Oyebadejo	3:17
4.	"Filters"	I. Nwokike; J. Nwokike; Scribz Riley; Darian Houser	Dare House	2:55
5.	"Honeywheat"	I. Nwokike; J. Nwokike; Abellard	Da-P	3:12
6.	"Addicted"	I. Nwokike; J. Nwokike; IAMNOBODI; Oyebadejo	Jay "Kurzweil" Oyebadejo, IAMNOBODI	4:57
7.	"Cool Off the Rain (Interlude)"	I. Nwokike; J. Nwokike; Tyler Acord	Lophiile	1:54
8.	"Through Enough" (featuring GoldLink)	I. Nwokike; J. Nwokike; Lophiile; Skyler Acord; D'Anthony Carlos	Skyler Acord & Lophiile	4:28
9.	"Another Lover"	I. Nwokike; J. Nwokike; Louis Kevin Celestin	KAYTRANADA	3:48
10.	"'Til Morning"	I. Nwokike; J. Nwokike; Alexander Ben-Abdallah	Louie Lastic	3:26
11.	"Best Believe"	I. Nwokike; J. Nwokike; Oyebadejo; Sedik Boudif	Jay "Kurzweil" Oyebadejo, DikC	4:00
12.	"The One"	I. Nwokike; J. Nwokike; Talay Riley; Scribz Riley	Scribz Riley	2:43
13.	"Easy" (featuring Berhana & Leikeli47)	I. Nwokike; J. Nwokike; Oyebadejo; Leikeli47; Berhana	Jay "Kurzweil" Oyebadejo	3:54
14.	"Rewind Time" (featuring Little Simz)	I. Nwokike; J. Nwokike; Oyebadejo; DrewsThatDude; Rodney Montreal	Jay "Kurzweil" Oyebadejo, DrewsThatDude, Huck, Fortune	5:26
Total length:				52:19

Silk Canvas (The Remixes)
No.	Title	Length
1.	"Cool Off the Rain" (featuring Ari Lennox)	3:13
2.	"Through Enough (Remix)" (featuring MNEK)	4:30
3.	"Honeywheat (Remix)" (featuring Saba)	3:31
4.	"Addicted 2 (Keep Cool Remix)" (featuring Bas)	3:25
5.	"In & Out" (featuring Xavier Omär)	4:09
6.	"Through Enough (Jarreau Vandal Remix)" (featuring GoldLink)	4:18
7.	"Addicted (Krs. Dancehall Edit)"	3:31
8.	"'Til the Morning (Jayvon Remix)"	4:06
9.	"Touch the Floor (mOma+Guy Remix)" (featuring Masego)	3:23
