= Look Who's Laughing Now =

2024 single by Benjamin Ingrosso

Single by Benjamin Ingrosso

from the album Pink Velvet Theatre
- Released: 14 June 2024
- Genre: Pop
- Length: 2:54
- Label: EMI
- Songwriters: Benjamin Ingrosso; Jessica Agombar; David Stewart
- Producer: David Stewart

Benjamin Ingrosso singles chronology
"Honey Boy" (2024)	"Look Who's Laughing Now" (2024)	"All My Life" (2024)

Music video
- "Look Who's Laughing Now" on YouTube

"Look Who's Laughing Now" is a song by Swedish singer Benjamin Ingrosso. It was released on 14 June 2024 and debuted at number 1 on the Swedish chart.

The song was part of Ingrosso's medley performance at the 2024 Eurovision Song Contest interval.

== Critical reception ==
Numero Mag said "Exuding positivity and carelessness, this pop anthem is set smiles and funky dance moves all summer long."

== Charts ==
=== Weekly charts ===
Weekly chart performance for "Look Who's Laughing Now"
Chart (2024)	Peak position
Finland Airplay (Radiosoittolista)	23
Iceland (Tónlistinn)	38
Norway (VG-lista)	27
San Marino Airplay (SMRTV Top 50)	40
Sweden (Sverigetopplistan)	1
UK Singles Downloads (Official Charts)	98

=== Year-end charts ===
Year-end chart performance for "Look Who's Laughing Now"
Chart (2024)	Position
Sweden (Sverigetopplistan)	28

== Certifications ==
Certifications for "Look Who's Laughing Now"
Region	Certification	Certified units/sales
Streaming
Sweden (GLF)	Gold	6,000,000^{†}
^{†} Streaming-only figures based on certification alone.

== See also ==
- List of number-one singles of the 2020s (Sweden)
