= Alpha (Shenseea album) =

Studio album by Shenseea
- Released: March 11, 2022
- Genre: Dancehall; hip-hop; pop
- Length: 40:10
- Label: Rich Immigrants; Interscope
- Producer: Arsenio Archer; Banx & Ranx; BoogzDaBeast; Chimney Records; Cool & Dre; Di Genius; DJ Blackboi; Dr. Luke; IllaDaProducer; Jonah Christian; Joseph L'Étranger; KDDO; London on da Track; M.R.I.; Murda Beatz; Romeich Entertainment Unlimited; Rvssian; Sam Sumser; Sean Small; Scott Storch; Slyda Di Wizard; Smash David; the Stereotypes; Supa Dups; Theron Thomas; Tobias Wincorn; Westen Weiss

Shenseea chronology
Alpha (2022)	Never Gets Late Here (2024)

Singles from Alpha
- 1. "Blessed" Released: May 22, 2019; 2. "Lick" Released: January 21, 2022; 3. "R U That" Released: February 17, 2022; 4. "Deserve It" Released: March 3, 2022

Professional ratings
Review scores
Source	Rating
Pitchfork	(6.8/10)
The Guardian	3/5 stars

Alpha is the debut studio album by Jamaican musician Shenseea. It was released on March 11, 2022, through Rich Immigrants and Interscope Records. It includes guest appearances from 21 Savage, Beenie Man, Megan Thee Stallion, Offset, Sean Paul, and Tyga. Production is contributed by Rvssian, London on da Track and Scott Storch, among others.

== Background and release ==
In 2019, Shenseea signed to Rich Immigrants, an imprint of Interscope Records. She praised the owner of the imprint, Rvssian, for allowing her to work with different producers, instead of limiting her to just him. The lead single of Alpha, "Lick", was released on January 21, 2022. The song is a collaboration with American rapper Megan Thee Stallion. The second single, "R U That", featuring Atlanta-based rapper 21 Savage, was released on February 17. The next single, "Deserve It", was released on March 3. It was performed on Jimmy Kimmel Live! the night of its release.

=== Title ===
Shenseea originally opted to title the album Eleanor, after her late mother. She decided to change the album's title to Alpha because she didn't want to experience the sadness associated with her mother's death every time she spoke about the record.

== Composition ==
Alpha is a dancehall, hip-hop, and pop record. The album begins with the ballad "Target", a "beachy" song with a twist regarding love at the end. The track which follows, "Can't Anymore", is a more gleeful offering, where Shenseea announces that "she want[s] to get nasty". Alpha remains in a positive mood through the fourth track "R U That", which features 21 Savage. The song was described as "cheeky", and its lyrics go through a list of qualifications that a potential lover must meet.

== Critical reception ==
Dean Van Nguyen of Pitchfork in a 6.8/10 review, scribed, "The Jamaican singer (born Chinsea Lee) delivers 14 fully formed songs with polished production values, sticky hooks, and a few gimmicks." Rachel Aroesti of The Guardian, in a 3/5 stars review, also wrote, "by the album’s conclusion, you can’t help but feel you’re in the presence of Jamaican dancehall’s next big crossover star: a woman with the ability to cover all bases without ever watering down her distinctive – and unabashedly risque – presence."

== Commercial performance ==
Alpha debuted at number two on the Billboard Reggae Albums chart, with 4,900 album-equivalent units, of which 800 were sales of the record. 2,000 album units were composed of individual song sales. The album received 4,616,400 on-demand audio streams in its first week of release; it earned 750,000 video streams in that time frame. Alpha's number-two chart positioning occurred beneath Bob Marley and the Wailers' greatest hits album Legend (1984), which received 11,162 album-equivalent units in the same week, and remained at number one on the chart for a 115th consecutive week. The following week, Alpha fell two spots to number four on the Reggae chart, moving 2,600 units.

Alpha posted the best first-week sales for a reggae album since Popcaan's album Fixtape (2020).

== Track listing ==
Track listing for Alpha
No.	Title	Writer(s)	Producer(s)	Length
1.	"Target" (featuring Tyga)	Chinsea Lee; Jonathan Yip; Ray Romulus; Jeremy Reeves; Ray Charles McCullough II; Michael Stevenson	The Stereotypes	2:56
2.	"Can't Anymore"	Lee; Jonah Christian; London Holmes; Ayoola Oladapo Agboola; Remey Williams	London on da Track; Jonah Christian; Arsenio Archer; KDDO	2:35
3.	"Deserve It"	Lee; Andrew Green; Tarik Johnston	Rvssian	3:13
4.	"R U That" (featuring 21 Savage)	Lee; Shéyaa Abraham-Joseph; Donny Flores; Łukasz Gottwald; Theron Thomas; Timothy Thomas	Dr. Luke	2:42
5.	"Lick" (with Megan Thee Stallion)	Lee; Megan Pete; Shane Lindstrom; Anastas Hackett; Harkness Taitt; Jahmal Gwin; Jeremy McIntyre; Lance Shipp; Natalia Marshall; Rachel Kennedy; Romika Faniel; Tobias Wincorn	Murda Beatz; Joseph L'Étranger; BoogzDaBeast; Tobias Wincorn	2:46
6.	"Bouncy" (featuring Offset)	Lee; Kiari Cephus; Westen Weiss; Anthony Clemons, Jr.; Patrizio Pigliapoco; Samuel David Jimenez	Smash David; Westen Weiss	2:26
7.	"Henkel Glue" (featuring Beenie Man)	Lee; Moses Anthony Davis; David Hayle; Jordan Mcclure; Yannick Rastogi; Zacharie Raymond	Chimney Records; Banx & Ranx	2:59
8.	"Lying If I Call It Love" (featuring Sean Paul)	Lee; Sean Paul Henriques; Tim Gomringer; Kevin Gomringer; Marcello Valenzano; Andre Lyon; Dwayne Chin-Quee; Clemons; Kennedy; Marshall; Shipp	Cool & Dre; Supa Dups	3:22
9.	"Hangover"	Lee; Johnston; Kennedy; Marshall; Shipp; Richard Lain McClashie	Rvssian; M.R.I.	3:07
10.	"Body Count"	Lee; Atia Boggs; Illyah Fraser; Dmitri McDowell; Kennedy; Marshall; Shipp	Scott Storch; IllaDaProducer	3:03
11.	"Egocentric"	Lee; Donavan Jerome Thomas; Rayon Curate	Slyda Di Wizard; DJ Blackboi	2:21
12.	"Shen Ex Anthem"	Lee; D. Thomas; Curate; Romeich Major	Romeich Entertainment Unlimited	2:54
13.	"Sun Comes Up"	Lee; Green; Kennedy; Marshall; McClashie; Johnston; Shipp; Rajeiro Lee	Rvssian; M.R.I.	3:15
14.	"Blessed" (with Tyga)	Lee; Stevenson; Th. Thomas; Johnston; Stephen McGregor; Sean Small; Sam Sumser	Theron Thomas; Sumser; Small; Di Genius; Rvssian	2:25
Total length:				40:10

== Charts ==
Chart (2022)	Peak position
US Reggae Albums (Billboard)	2
US Heatseekers Albums (Billboard)	3
