= All My Life (Benjamin Ingrosso song) =

2024 single by Benjamin Ingrosso

Single by Benjamin Ingrosso

from the album Pink Velvet Theatre
- Released: 9 August 2024
- Length: 3:02 (single version); 4:35 (album version)
- Label: EMI
- Songwriters: Benjamin Ingrosso; Salem Al Fakir; Anya Jones; Vincent Pontare
- Producers: Salem Al Fakir; Lucas Albrektsson; Wille Emblad; Vincent Pontare

Benjamin Ingrosso singles chronology
"Look Who's Laughing Now" (2024)	"All My Life" (2024)	"Back to You" (2024)

"All My Life" is a song by Swedish singer Benjamin Ingrosso. It was released on 9 August 2024 as the fourth single from his fifth studio album, Pink Velvet Theatre.

Ingrosso said "'All My Life' is about finally discovering what you've always been searching for, whether it's love, a lifestyle, a career, or a long-held dream. It embodies the feeling that anything is possible. For me, it's about both a person and achieving my lifelong dream. This is the most playful song I've ever written and produced."

== Critical reception ==
Josh Sharpe from BroadwayWorld described the song as an "exuberant, fist-pumping single capturing the thrill of a night out that just keeps getting better." Scandipop called it "a joyous, up-tempo anthem that pretty much demands that you sing-along with its carefree chorus."

== Charts ==
Chart performance for "All My Life"
Chart (2024)	Peak position
Sweden (Sverigetopplistan)	3
