= Studying Abroad =

EP by Masego
- Released: November 13, 2020; Deluxe: May 21, 2021
- Recorded: 2020
- Genres: R&B; jazz fusion; dancehall
- Labels: UMG Recordings, Inc.; EQT Recordings, LLC.

Masego chronology
Lady Lady (2018)	Studying Abroad (2020)

Singles from Studying Abroad
- 1. "Passport" Released: September 16, 2020; 2. "Silver Tongue Devil" Released: October 7, 2020; 3. "Mystery Lady" Released: November 10, 2020

Studying Abroad is an extended play by Jamaican-American singer Masego. It was released on November 13, 2020 by UMG Recordings, Inc. and EQT Recordings, LLC. The deluxe edition, Studying Abroad: Extended Stay, was released on May 21, 2021.

== Background ==
Masego said the EP was inspired by his experiences in travelling saying "I took a lot of inspiration from Japan, South Africa, Nigeria, Amsterdam, and Stockholm." He also commented on releasing it during the COVID-19 pandemic and said "If the world is burning and crazy things are happening, I feel like I can help by just releasing music, just to escape that for a little bit." He spoke about his recording process during quarantine saying "Any producer that you could name has a high level of shyness and introversion. I've been in my crib. I'm always in the studio. I looked up to dudes staying in the studio for multiple summers and staying in their room figuring things out."

== Promotion and singles ==
On September 16, 2020, Masego released the first single from the EP called "Passport", produced by D'Mile. On October 7, the second single, "Silver Tongue Devil" was released, with Shenseea. On November 10, he released the third single, "Mystery Lady", with Don Toliver.

== Critical reception ==
In a positive review, Megan Walder of Clash wrote about the EP saying "Smooth sax entwined with a sophisticated exploration of lo-fi sound and beats, Masego has hit the ball running once more with this new EP Studying Abroad. Traversing the peaks and troughs of a relationship, the concept piece not only demonstrates his expansion in terms of collaborations and production choices but presents yet another side to this multifaceted artist."

== Track listing ==
Studying Abroad track listing
No.	Title	Writer(s)	Producer(s)	Length
1.	"Passport"	Micah Davis; Dernst Emile II	D'Mile	3:17
2.	"Silver Tongue Devil" (with Shenseea)	Davis; Dustin Corbett; Andron Francois Cross; Chris Madine; Chinsea Lee	Izybeats; Corbett; Chris Madine	3:15
3.	"Mystery Lady" (with Don Toliver)	Davis; Kojo Asamoah; Sam Gellaitry; Andrew Maxwell Hunter; Caleb Zackery Toliver; Ebony Naomi Oshunrinde	WondaGurl; Sam Gellaitry; Kojo	3:48
4.	"Polygamy"	Davis; Jack Dine; Steve Octave	Steve Octave; Jack Dine	1:52
5.	"Sides of Me"	Davis; Ross James; Cheney Lisa Parsons	Monro	2:00
6.	"Bye Felicia"	Davis; Emile II	D'Mile	2:38
Total length:				16:53

Studying Abroad: Extended Stay track listing
No.	Title	Writer(s)	Producer(s)	Length
7.	"Bliss Abroad" (featuring Sheléa)	Davis; Everett Romano; Jack Dine; Steve Octave	Steve Octave; Jack Dine; Heavy Mellow	3:11
8.	"Smith & Westin" (with TeaMarrr)	Davis; Darwin C. Quinn; Johnny Silva; Jonah Christian; Luke Crowder; Thamar Noel	C Gutta; Jonah Christian; Luke Crowder	3:38
9.	"Well Traveled"	Davis; Bailey Rial Goldberg; Cedric L. Mitchell II; Malik Toure Johnson; Michael Daniel Foster	99TheProducer; Berg; Masego	2:46
10.	"Yebo/Sema"	Davis; Andron Francois Cross; Gabrielle Geertruid Stok	Izybeats	3:48
11.	"Mystery Lady (TrapHouseJazz Remix)"	Davis; Asamoah; Gellaitry; Hunter; Toliver; Oshunrinde	Masego; Sam Gellaitry; WondaGurl; Kojo	3:42
Total length:				34:11
