= Funny Feeling (Benjamin Ingrosso song) =

Single by Benjamin Ingrosso

from the album Baby Don't Say That, I'm Sensitive
- Released: September 18, 2026
- Studio: Riksmixningsverket (Stockholm)
- Genre: Pop; disco
- Length: 3:12
- Label: Universal
- Songwriters: Benjamin Ingrosso; John Shazam; Montgomery; David Stewart; Pablo Bowman; Timothy Collins
- Producers: Benjamin Ingrosso; Jonathan Rado; Kane Ritchotte

Benjamin Ingrosso singles chronology
"Angela" (2025)	"Funny Feeling" (2026)	"Mommy's Boy" (2026)

Music video
- "Funny Feeling" on YouTube

"Funny Feeling" (stylized in all lowercase) is a song by Swedish singer and songwriter Benjamin Ingrosso, released on September 18, 2026, through Universal Music AB. Released at the same time as "Waste My Time", it is the lead single from Ingrosso's sixth studio album Baby Don't Say That, I'm Sensitive (2026). It was written by Ingrosso, John Shazam, Montgomery, David Stewart, Pablo Bowman and Timothy Collins and produced by Ingrosso, Jonathan Rado and Kane Ritchotte.

It is a pop song with disco influences about the confusing emotions and unexplainable feelings that come with falling for someone and the uncertainty of where it might lead, as well as emotional unavailability.

"Funny Feeling" received generally positive reviews from critics who praised the production and the maturity of the lyrics which explore sexual desire and complex relationships. Commercially, the song was less successful than "Waste My Time" as it debuted at number 25 on the Swedish singles chart.

== Background and composition ==
"Funny Feeling" was recorded across the United States, England and Sweden, before being completed during two intensive weeks at Benny Andersson's Riksmixningsverket studio (Stockholm). Ingrosso participated in the writing and producing process, by teaming up with Jonathan Rado and Kane Ritchotte.

A pop song with disco and soul influences, it is driven by a bright pop piano where Ingrosso sings about his love interest's unavailability and the strange and unexplainable feelings when you are attracted to someone. The singer described the song by stating, "I always fall in love in the kind of way you normally only see in films. [...] I’m prepared to do anything, and I lose sight of everything else in my life. I always think I’ve found the right person, but then things take a completely different turn."

== Release and promotion ==
Ingrosso took a break from social media in 2026 before returning on Instagram in August to announce plans for future material. In mid-September, he teased the music video for "Funny Feeling" and "Waste My Time" in a post, before announcing the release date for 18 September 2026.

Both songs were included on the Mommy's Boy EP which was surprise-released on 16 October 2026. The same day, Ingrosso announced his sixth studio album Baby Don't Say That, I'm Sensitive which includes all the songs from the EP.

== Critical reception ==
Upon its release, "Funny Feeling" received generally positive reviews from critics who praised its lyrics and production. Markus Larsson from Aftonbladet gave the song a three out of five rating, stating that "the beat in “Funny Feeling” is reminiscent of Marvin Gaye’s “Got to Give It Up, Pt. 1”", and adding that "the soft mix of soul and pop is recognizable, but the lyrics sound like a mid-life crisis." Swedish website Popmuzik called it "a playful piano-driven song that breathes soulful pop." Culture Fix described the song as "disco-flavoured pop bolstered by an infectious piano-driven backing," and complimented it by saying, "It’s breezy, bright and taps into lustful romance."

== Commercial performance ==
"Funny Feeling" experienced weaker commercial success on the charts than "Waste My Time", debuting at number 25 on the Swedish singles chart. However, it peaked at number 5 on the radio record chart of the country. The song peaked at number 17 on Apple Music and number 32 on Spotify in Sweden.

== Music video ==
The music video for "Funny Feeling" was directed by Jacob Rangnitt, while the creative direction was handled by Ingrosso, Rangnitt and Timothy Collins. A video snippet was teased on the singer's Instagram on 14 September 2026. It was released alongside the song on YouTube on 18 September 2026.

The video opens with Ingrosso laying in a pool and enjoying the sun while other scenes show him stalking his love interest, Swedish actress Rebecka Harper, and her on-screen boyfriend, Swedish model Lucas Kalda, on vacation. The singer follows them everywhere they go, acting like a tourist while observing them from afar. In his hotel room, Ingrosso prepares his tools to abduct and kill his rival. Once he manages to get him tied up on the tarpaulin-covered bedroom's floor, he kills him with an axe, covering himself with blood all over his face. He then proceeds to leave the hotel by taking the elevator, where he encounters the couple, which wakes him up from his daydream.

== Credits and personnel ==
Credits were adapted from Spotify.

- Benjamin Ingrosso – vocals, songwriting, producer, piano
- John Shazam – songwriting
- Montgomery – songwriting
- David Stewart – songwriting
- Pablo Bowman – songwriting
- Timothy Collins – songwriting
- Jonathan Rado – producer, programming, Wurlitzer electronic piano, synthesizer, electric guitar
- Kane Ritchotte – producer, programming, bass, drums, percussions, electric guitar, guitar
- Greg Phillinganes – keyboard, piano
- Pino Palladino – bass
- Rocket Ritchotte – guitar, slide guitar
- Wille Emblad – vocal production
- Ian Gold – vocal production, engineering, mixing
- Marcus Hoh – additional mixing
- Björn Engelmann – mastering

Partly recorded at Riksmixningsverket studio (Stockholm).

== Charts ==
Weekly chart performance for "Funny Feeling"
Chart (2026)	Peak position
Sweden (Sverigetopplistan)	25
Sweden Airplay (Svensktoppen)	5

== Release history ==
Release dates and formats
Region	Date	Format(s)	Label(s)	Ref.
Worldwide	18 September 2026	Digital download; streaming	Universal Music AB; EMI Nordic	
