= Never Gets Late Here =

2024 studio album by Shenseea

Studio album by Shenseea
- Released: 24 May 2024
- Genres: R&B; dancehall; pop; reggae; hip-hop; afrobeats; Latin trap
- Length: 35:56
- Labels: Rich Immigrants; Interscope
- Producers: Arsenio Archer; Banx & Ranx; Believve; Chimney Records; Cubeatz; Di Genius; Dunw3ll; FnZ; Jeff Gitelman; Gxlden; Harvey Chaplin; Ilya; King Wizard; London on da Track; Romeich Entertainment Unlimited; Rvssian; Stargate; Tricky Stewart; Supa Dups; Supah Mario; Remey Williams

Shenseea chronology
Alpha (2022)	Never Gets Late Here (2024)

Singles from Never Gets Late Here
- 1. "Hit & Run" Released: 26 January 2024; 2. "Die For You" Released: 28 March 2024; 3. "Neva Neva" Released: 26 April 2024; 4. "Flava" Released: 24 May 2024; 5. "Work Me Out" Released: 30 July 2024

Never Gets Late Here is the second studio album by Jamaican singer Shenseea. It was released through Rich Immigrants and Interscope Records on 24 May 2024. The album contains guest appearances from Coi Leray, Masicka, Rvssian, Di Genius, Wizkid and Anitta. It serves as the follow-up to her debut album, Alpha (2022).

== Background, release, and composition ==
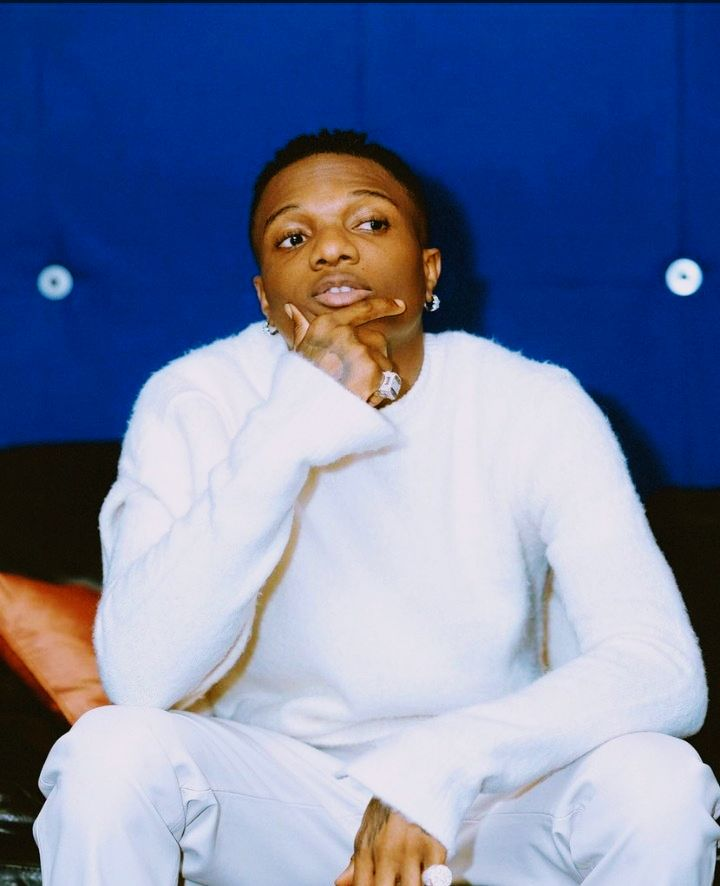
Afrobeats star Wizkid (pictured) is featured on the digital-only version of the album's single "Work Me Out"

"Never Gets Late Here" was released on 24 May 2024. The album builds upon the success of Shenseea's critically acclaimed debut album, "Alpha" (2022).

The album features a lineup of artists including Afrobeats star Wizkid, Coi Leray, Anitta, Masicka, and Di Genius. The lead single "Hit & Run" which featured Masicka and Di Genius was released on 26 January 2024 to critical and commercial success becoming a substantial hit in Shenseea's home country Jamaica and elsewhere in the Caribbean. The music video has garnered over 60 million views as of July 2024. The next single "Die For You" was released on 28 March 2024 and was also a success with the music video garnering over 5 million views by May 2024. It was followed by "Neva Neva" and "Flava", the latter featuring American rapper Coi Leray.

The album is a blend of dancehall, hip-hop, reggae, R&B, pop, and reggaeton with influences of afrobeats and latin-trap.

== Critical reception ==
The album received positive reviews upon its release. Hypebeast admired Shenseea's signature Jamaican pop sound while complimenting the album's use of other genres as well such as hip-hop and R&B. Kaboom magazine said the album "solidified Shenseea as the leading Jamaican international artist of our generation" meanwhile People commented on the summery dancehall-pop vibes and showed appreciation for its soundscape of Latin trap and heavy Afrobeats.

== Chart performance ==
The album debuted at number four on Billboard Reggae Albums charts with sales of over 2,000 units; However, it was significantly less than her previous album's sales of 4,900 units.

The album reached number 1 on the US iTunes Album charts.

== Track listing ==
Never Gets Late Here track listing
No.	Title	Writer(s)	Producer(s)	Length
1.	"Face Lift (Intro)"	Chinsea Lee; Arsenio Archer; Isaac de Boni; London Holmes; Rajeiro Lee; Nathalia Marshall; Michael Mulé; Remey Williams	Archer; FnZ; London on da Track; Williams	1:40
2.	"Hit & Run" (with Masicka and Di Genius)	Lee; Javaun Fearon; Stephen McGregor	Di Genius; Nick Bane^{[v]}	2:50
3.	"Tap Out"	Lee; David Hayle; Jordan McClure; Yannick Rastogi; Zacharie Raymond	Banx & Ranx; Chimney Records; Bane^{[v]}	1:51
4.	"Neva Neva"	Dwayne Chin-Quee; McGregor; Priscilla Renea; Ilya Salmanzadeh; Theron Thomas; Timothy Thomas	Di Genius; Ilya; Supa Dups; Bane^{[v]}; Dunw3ll^{[v]}	3:19
5.	"Die for You"	Lee; Andrew Green; Andre Gordon; Tarik Johnston; Oswaldo Rangel	Rvssian	2:21
6.	"Keep a Place"	Lee; Chibu Amajoyi; Nija Charles; Donny Flores; Jonathan Priester; Jesse Singer; Chris Soper; Tre'Von Waters	Supah Mario; Likeminds^{[a]}; Kuk Harrell^{[v]}	2:17
7.	"Dolla"	Lee; Lydia Asrat; Jeffrey Atkins; Bane; Terrence Britten; Joseph Cartagena; Charles; Philip Cornish; Mario Dunwell; Flores; Daniel Guerrerro Ramos; Holmes; Irving Lorenzo; Colin Lucas; Graham Lyle; Andre Parker; Grace Redway; Christopher Rios; Rosina Russell; Tyshane Thompson	Dunw3ll; Gxlden; London on da Track^{[p]}; Phil the Keys; Bane^{[a]}^{[v]}; Louie Gomez^{[v]}	2:40
8.	"Loyalty"	Lee; Mikhail Miller; Romeich Major	Romeich Entertainment Unlimited	3:39
9.	"Flava" (with Coi Leray)	Lee; Coi Leray Collins; Flores; Jeff Gitelman; Gamal Lewis; Marcus Lomax; Nathalia Marshall; Kevin Theodore	Gitelman; Bane^{[v]}; Harrell^{[v]}; Javier Martinez^{[v]}; John Busser^{[v]}	2:45
10.	"NaNa"	Lee; Gary DeCarlo; Dale Frashuer; Paul Leka; Corey Lindsay-Keay; Marshall; Simon Plummer; Aubrey Robinson; Christopher A. Stewart; Theron Thomas	Believve; Tricky Stewart^{[p]}; Richard Ledesma^{[v]}	2:54
11.	"Red Flag" (with Anitta)	Lee; Milton Adams II; Andy Clay; Larissa de Macedo Machado; Robert Douglas-Sola; Flores; Sheldon Grant; Randall Hammers; Jonathan Holder; Holmes; Ofer Ishai; Dazmiere Johnson; Madison Love; Oscar Poncell; Franshesco Viran; Antonio Wililams	King Wizard; London on da Track; Andy^{[a]}; Kuji^{[a]}; Tonedeaf^{[a]}	2:46
12.	"Stars"	Lee; Mikkel Eriksen; Tor Hermansen; Jimmy Napes; Sam Smith	Stargate	2:19
13.	"Heaven on Earth"	Lee; Harry Chaplin; Jocelyn Donald; Kevin Gomringer; Tim Gomringer; Holmes; Williams	Cubeatz; Harvey Chaplin; London on da Track; Williams	3:05
14.	"Work Me Out" (with Wizkid; digital track)	Lee; Ayodeji Balogun; Holmes; Lindsay-Keay	Believve; London on da Track; Shenseea	2:43
Total length:				35:56

Notes

- ^{^[p]} signifies a primary and vocal producer
- ^{^[a]} signifies an additional producer
- ^{^[v]} signifies a vocal producer

Samples and interpolations

- "Dolla" samples "What's Luv?" (2001), written and performed by Fat Joe and Ashanti, and interpolates "Dollar Wine" (1991), written and performed by Colin Lucas.
- "NaNa" interpolates "Na Na Hey Hey Kiss Him Goodbye" (1969), written and performed by Steam.
- "Red Flag" samples "La Ola" (2016), written by Oscar Poncell, Franshesco Viran, Nasrine Rahmani, Steven Silk, Sebastián Orellana and Elisha Maiyah and performed by San Lazaro.

== Personnel ==
Musicians

- Shenseea – vocals
- Di Genius – keyboards, programming, vocals (track 2)
- Masicka – vocals (track 2)
- Coi Leray – vocals (track 9)
- Anitta – vocals (track 11)
- Wizkid – vocals (track 14)

Technical

- Colin Leonard – mastering (tracks 1, 3, 4, 6–14)
- Di Genius – mastering (track 2), engineering (2, 8)
- Rvssian – mastering, engineering (track 5)
- Niko Marzouca – mixing (tracks 3, 5)
- Serban Ghenea – mixing (tracks 4, 11)
- Black Spyda – mixing (tracks 6, 8)
- Dunw3ll – mixing (track 6)
- Nick Bane – mixing (tracks 8, 13, 14), engineering (4, 6–14), vocal engineering (6), additional mixing (3, 6), mixing assistance (7, 10)
- Josh Gudwin – mixing (track 9)
- Jaycen Joshua – mixing (track 10)
- Kevin Davis – mixing (track 12)
- AyoRoc – engineering (tracks 6, 9)
- Javier Martinez – engineering (tracks 6, 9)
- John Busser – engineering (tracks 6, 9)
- Paniik – engineering (tracks 8, 14)
- Richard Ledesma – engineering (track 10)
- Louie Gomez – engineering (tracks 11, 13), additional mixing (13), mixing assistance (7)
- Mike Seaberg – mix engineering (track 10)
- Kuk Harrell – vocal engineering (tracks 6, 9)
- Jelli Dorman – vocal engineering (tracks 6, 9)
- Bryce Bordone – mixing assistance (tracks 4, 11)
- Felix Byrne – mixing assistance (track 9)
- DJ Riggins – mixing assistance (track 10)
- Jacob Richards –mixing assistance (track 10)
- Rachel Blum – mixing assistance (track 10)
- Isaac Diskin – engineering assistance (track 4)
- Nico Patino – engineering assistance (track 4)
- Ramses Ascanio – engineering assistance (track 7)
- Kenya Tolbert – engineering assistance (track 10)
- Nick Goff – engineering assistance (track 10)

== Charts ==
Chart (2024)	Peak position
US Reggae Albums (Billboard)	4
