= Better Days (Benjamin Ingrosso song) =

2024 single by Benjamin Ingrosso

Single by Benjamin Ingrosso

from the album Pink Velvet Theatre
- Released: 5 April 2024
- Length: 3:38
- Label: EMI Music
- Songwriters: Benjamin Ingrosso; Salem Al Fakir; Anya Jones; Vincent Pontare
- Producers: Wille Enblad; Vargas & Lagola

Benjamin Ingrosso singles chronology
"Kite" (2024)	"Better Days" (2024)	"Honey Boy" (2024)

Music video
- "Better Days" on YouTube

"Better Days" is a song by Swedish singers Benjamin Ingrosso. It was released on 5 April 2024 as the second single from his fifth studio album, Pink Velvet Theatre. It peaked at number 7 on the Swedish chart.

Ingrosso said "'Better Days' is about hope, youthful naivety, and longing for things to get better. It somewhat describes my personality – to always want to see the positive and believe that everything will get better. I’ve been holding on to this song for almost 4 years, but all the upcoming songs very much describe my current state of mind, the pursuit of a happy life well spent. I want to spread love."

== Critical reception ==
Scandipop said "The retro-hued track sees Benjamin lean into his ABBA-laden musical heritage, and it's already sounding like it'll be a future classic amongst his own rich repertoire."

== Charts ==
=== Weekly charts ===
Weekly chart performance for "Better Days"
Chart (2024)	Peak position
Sweden (Sverigetopplistan)	7

=== Year-end charts ===
Year-end chart performance for "Better Days"
Chart (2024)	Position
Sweden (Sverigetopplistan)	83

== Certifications ==
Certifications for "Better Days"
Region	Certification	Certified units/sales
Sweden (GLF)	Gold	6,000,000^{†}
^{†} Streaming-only figures based on certification alone.
