= Honey Boy (Purple Disco Machine and Benjamin Ingrosso song) =

2024 single by Purple Disco Machine and Benjamin Ingrosso

Single by Purple Disco Machine and Benjamin Ingrosso featuring Shenseea and Nile Rodgers

from the album Paradise, Pink Velvet Theatre
- Released: 3 May 2024
- Length: 3:47
- Label: Sweat It Out/ RCA Records
- Songwriters: Benjamin Ingrosso; Anya Jones; Chinsea Linda Lee; Hampus Lindvall; Nile Rodgers; Tino Schmidt
- Producers: Nile Rodgers; Purple Disco Machine; Hampus Lindvall

Purple Disco Machine singles chronology
"Higher Ground" (2024)	"Honey Boy" (2024)	"Heartbreaker" (2024)

Benjamin Ingrosso singles chronology
"Better Days" (2024)	"Honey Boy" (2024)	"Look Who's Laughing Now" (2024)

Music video
- "Honey Boy" on YouTube

"Honey Boy" is a song by German record producer Purple Disco Machine and Swedish singer Benjamin Ingrosso featuring Jamaican singer Shenseea and American musician Nile Rodgers. The song was released on 3 May 2024 and peaked at number 2 on the Swedish chart.

== Critical reception ==
Jay Seabrook from EDM Tunes said "'Honey Boy' sees the four musical powerhouses unite to create an electrifying summer anthem. The group combined the infectious grooves of classic funky disco with modern pop sensibilities. 'Honey Boy' transports listeners to a realm of pure euphoria with its rhythm, vocals and driving energy."

Culture Fix said "The number is a delicious summer anthem that has to size up as one of Benjamin's best tracks yet."

Molly from This Song is Sick said "The track is full of bright, funky instrumentation, and vibrant vocal lines that make you want to get up and dance."

== Track listings ==
Digital download and streaming

1. "Honey Boy" – 3:47

Digital download and streaming – Extended

1. "Honey Boy" – 3:47
2. "Honey Boy" (Extended version) – 7:11

Digital download and streaming – The Sponges remix

1. "Honey Boy" (The Sponges remix) – 3:39
2. "Honey Boy" (The Sponges Extended Remix) – 4:38

Vinyl/ 12"
A1. "Honey Boy" (Extended Version)
A2. "Honey Boy" (Original Mix)
B1. "Honey Boy" (Instrumental Mix)

== Charts ==
=== Weekly charts ===
Weekly chart performance for "Honey Boy"
Chart (2024–2025)	Peak position
Belarus Airplay (TopHit)	3
CIS Airplay (TopHit)	3
Estonia Airplay (TopHit)	14
Finland Airplay (Suomen virallinen radiosoittolista)	49
Kazakhstan Airplay (TopHit)	6
Latvia Airplay (LaIPA)	9
Lithuania Airplay (TopHit)	2
Moldova Airplay (TopHit)	86
North Macedonia Airplay (Radiomonitor)	3
Norway (VG-lista)	38
Poland (Polish Airplay Top 100)	6
Russia Airplay (TopHit)	1
San Marino Airplay (SMRTV Top 50)	29
Serbia Airplay (Radiomonitor)	2
Slovakia (Rádio Top 100)	15
Spain Airplay (PROMUSICAE)	16
Sweden (Sverigetopplistan)	2
Ukraine Airplay (TopHit)	11
UK Singles Downloads (OCC)	42

=== Monthly charts ===
Monthly chart performance for "Honey Boy"
Chart (2024)	Peak position
Belarus Airplay (TopHit)	4
CIS Airplay (TopHit)	4
Estonia Airplay (TopHit)	22
Kazakhstan Airplay (TopHit)	5
Latvia Airplay (TopHit)	4
Lithuania Airplay (TopHit)	11
Moldova Airplay (TopHit)	92
Russia Airplay (TopHit)	1
Slovakia (Rádio Top 100)	22
Ukraine Airplay (TopHit)	17

=== Year-end charts ===
Year-end chart performance for "Honey Boy"
Chart (2024)	Position
Belarus Airplay (TopHit)	32
CIS Airplay (TopHit)	37
Estonia Airplay (TopHit)	65
Kazakhstan Airplay (TopHit)	53
Poland (Polish Airplay Top 100)	70
Russia Airplay (TopHit)	33
Sweden (Sverigetopplistan)	10

Year-end chart performance for "Honey Boy"
Chart (2025)	Position
Estonia Airplay (TopHit)	198

== Certifications ==
Certifications for "Honey Boy"
Region	Certification	Certified units/sales
Norway (IFPI Norway)	Gold	30,000^{‡}
Poland (ZPAV)	Gold	25,000^{‡}
Streaming
Sweden (GLF)	Platinum	12,000,000^{†}
^{‡} Sales+streaming figures based on certification alone.^{†} Streaming-only figures based on certification alone.
