= Hooker Harvey's =

Restaurant and sex work hub in Toronto

Coordinates: 43.6605°N 79.3763°W

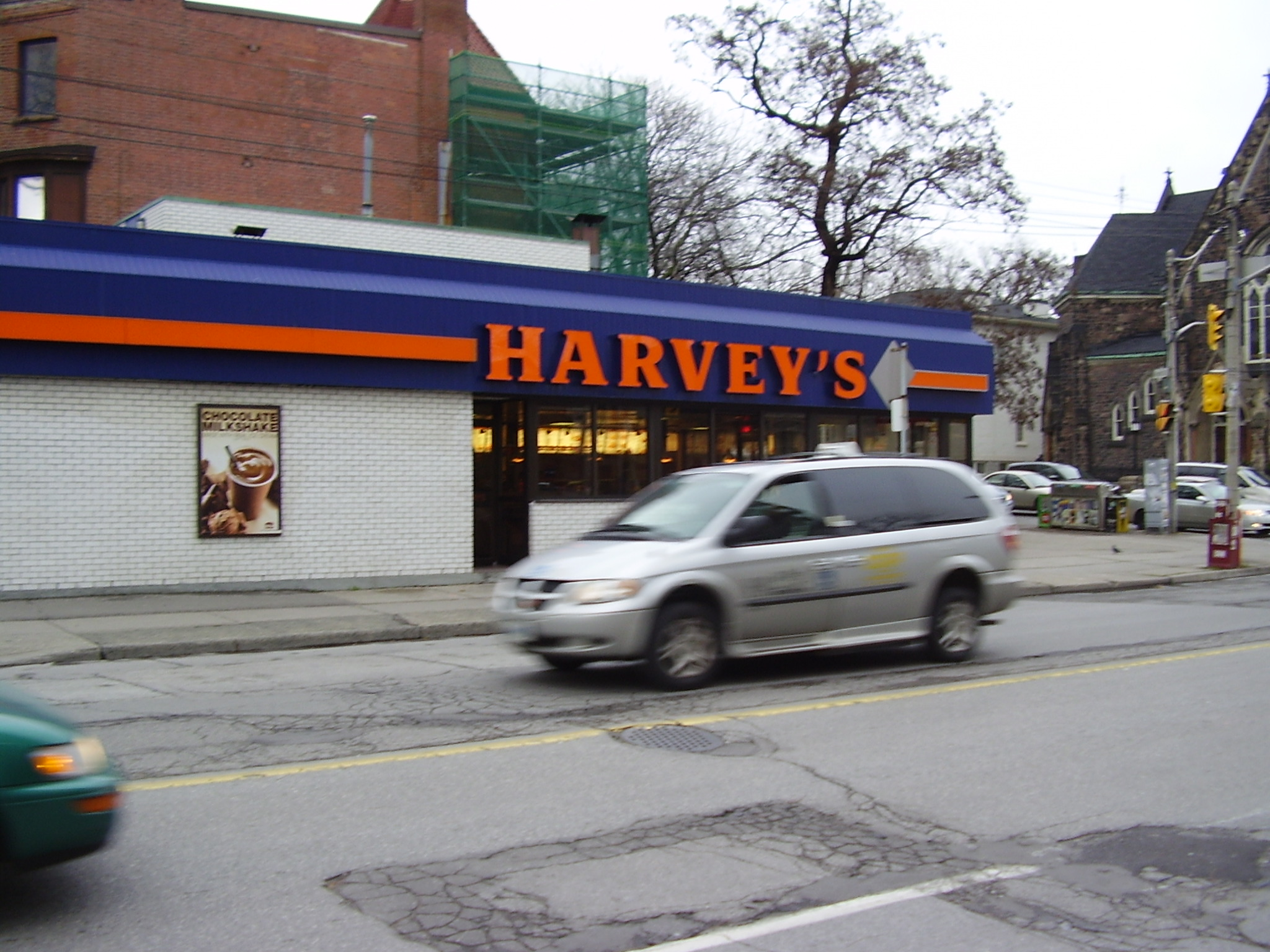
Hooker Harvey's in December 2009

Hooker Harvey's is a franchise outlet of the fast food restaurant chain Harvey's located at 278 Jarvis Street and Gerrard Street in Toronto, Ontario, Canada notable for having been a hub for prostitution and procuring.

== History ==
In the 1960s, Toronto's Jarvis Street became a hub for the sex trade, with the surrounding area containing strip clubs such as Zanzibar Tavern and adult movie theatres due to rapid suburban development. The outlet was constructed in 1973, and the parking lot of the Harvey's franchise in that area became a popular soliciting location due to the restaurant chain's late night operating hours, giving this particular franchise its common nickname of Hooker Harvey's. The Jarvis and Church street area is considered by Robyn Doolittle of the Toronto Star to be an especially high-end area of the Toronto street prostitution scene. Workers can earn up to $300 a client, with one woman named Ebony quoting her services for hundreds of dollars an hour in the Harvey's franchise's parking lot. Toronto's street prostitution scene is so lucrative due to Canada's laws surrounding prostitution, which used to criminalize activities such as operating brothels but not the actual act of prostitution itself. This meant it was legally safer for sex workers to offer their services on the street rather than indoors. However, in 2013, these laws were struck down in the case Canada (AG) v Bedford and were replaced with legislation criminalizing the purchase of sex work, but not the selling.

Over the years, Hooker Harvey's has endured many attempts to remove sex workers from the location. In 2009, roadwork blocked the sidewalk outside of the Harvey's, making it difficult to solicit customers and resulting in many sex workers leaving the location. In 2017, a rumour on social media spread claiming that a condominium would be built in Hooker Harvey's location. However, the City of Toronto later said there were no plans to demolish the location.

== In popular culture ==
Hooker Harvey's has also been the subject of artwork, with the anonymous digital artist Voidz publishing a digital rendering of a fake visual art installation outside of Harvey's franchise. Voidz described the franchise as a "legendary Toronto icon" and said that the location was representative of Toronto's culture of dark humour.
