= Lick (Shenseea and Megan Thee Stallion song) =

Single by Shenseea with Megan Thee Stallion

from the album Alpha
- Released: January 21, 2022
- Genre: Dancehall; hip hop
- Length: 2:46
- Label: Rich Immigrants; Interscope
- Songwriters: Anastas Hackett; Chinsea Lee; Harkness Taitt; Jahmal Gwin; Jeremy McIntyre; Lance Shipp; Megan Pete; Nathalia Marshall; Rachael Kennedy; Romika Faniel; Shane Lindstrom; Tobias Wincorn
- Producers: Murda Beatz; Joseph L'Étranger; BoogzDaBeast; Tobias Wincorn

Shenseea singles chronology
"Dolly" (2022)	"Lick" (2022)	"R U That" (2022)

Megan Thee Stallion singles chronology
"Megan's Piano" (2021)	"Lick" (2022)	"Sweetest Pie" (2022)

Music video
- "Lick" on YouTube

"Lick" is a song by Jamaican dancehall singer Shenseea with American rapper Megan Thee Stallion. It was released on January 21, 2022, as the lead single from Shenseea's debut studio album, Alpha.

== Background and release ==
Shenseea signed with Rich Immigrants and Interscope Records in 2019 and released "Blessed", her debut single later that year. "Blessed" was followed by the singles "Run Run", "Be Good", and "You're The One I Love" in 2020. In 2021, she collaborated with Kanye West for two songs on his album Donda. In November 2021, Megan Thee Stallion, who had previously collaborated with Jamaican artist Popcaan on the song "Intercourse", from her debut album, Good News (2020), posted on Twitter that she wanted to collaborate with dancehall singer Shenseea. The two were pictured together at the after-party for the 2021 BET Awards, after which they traded compliments on Instagram. Both artists began teasing their upcoming collaboration on Instagram on January 18, 2022, by posting the single's cover art with the caption, "Get ready!! We gonna go crazy this FRIDAY!" Megan and Shenseea posted another teaser image on Instagram the next day, with Shenseea including a quick clip from behind the scenes of the music video.

"Lick" was released on January 21, 2022, as the lead single from Shenseea's debut album, Alpha, which was released on March 11. Produced by Murda Beatz, the song contains a sample of "Work" by Pupa Nas-T and Denise Belfon. In the time leading up to the release of "Lick", "Work" had become more popular through a TikTok trend featuring the hook of "Put yuh back in it". Pupa Nas-T praised "Lick" upon its release, saying, "When I heard it, I knew it would be a hit." In March 2022, Pupa Nas-T filed a lawsuit against Shenseea and Interscope alleging that he had never given proper clearance for his song to be interpolated in "Lick".

== Reception ==
=== Critical and fan reception ===
Claire Valentine of Nylon praised the track as "an earworm hook matched with Meg's signature rapid-fire verse". Most critical reviews of "Lick" focused on the lewd lyrics in both the single and music video. While tweeting a teaser of the song, Shenseea said, "I always wanted to write a suck p*ssy song...some of y'all need guidance on how to eat". Naledi Ushe of PopSugar listed several of the cunnilingus innuendos present in the song, before saying, "I'm here for women being bold in songwriting. The rest of the lyrics ... I'll let you hear that for yourself." Wongo Okon of Uproxx said, "Context clues from the song should help clarify what is being licked, and if that's not enough, the song's accompanying music video should do the job."

Fans of Shenseea and Megan Thee Stallion had a negative social media reaction to the song, which garnered negative comparisons to "WAP", Megan's 2020 collaboration with Cardi B. Megan's verses were critiqued in particular, as some fans believed that her provocative lyrics were becoming redundant.

== Commercial performance ==
In the United States, "Lick" debuted at number 23 on Billboard's R&B/Hip-Hop Digital Song Sales chart, number 14 on Rap Digital Song Sales, and number 20 on the Bubbling Under Hot 100 chart. In Shenseea's native Jamaica, "Lick" was number one on the World Music Views YouTube chart, with over 800,000 streams, making it second to Tarrus Riley and Shenseea's 2020 "Lighter" for the second-biggest debut of all time. Shenseea was also the first Jamaican female dancehall artist to debut as lead artist on the Spotify Global Weekly Hip Hop Chart, coming in at number 122.

== Music video ==
The official music video for "Lick", co-directed by Shenseea and James Larese, was released on January 21, 2022 alongside the single release. Naledi Ushe of PopSugar described the video as giving "WAP" a "run for its money when it comes to raunchiness", with background dancers twerking atop ice cream cones, dripping popsicle visuals, and Shenseea singing with her legs spread, cartoon lips between them. Alejandra Gularte compared the visuals of the music video to the board game Candyland, with the singers dressed "in bright orange, yellow, and purple in a cotton candy dreamscape". This sentiment was echoed by Uproxx's Wongo Okon, who said, "Shenseea and Megan strut their stuff in Candyland throughout the visual which features lollipops, ice cream, and other tasty treats."

== Personnel ==
Credits adapted from Tidal.

- Shenseea – vocals, songwriting
- Megan Thee Stallion – vocals, songwriting
- Murda Beatz – songwriting, production
- Tobias Wincorn – songwriting, production
- Anastas Hackett – songwriting
- Harkness Taitt – songwriting
- Jahmal Gwin – songwriting
- Jeremy McIntyre – songwriting
- Lance Shipp – songwriting
- Nathalia Marshall – songwriting
- Rachael Kennedy – songwriting
- Romika Faniel – songwriting
- Shane Lindstrom – songwriting
- Joseph L'Étranger – production
- BoogzDaBeast – production

== Chart performance ==
Chart performance for "Lick"
Chart (2022)	Peak position
New Zealand Hot Singles (RMNZ)	26
US Bubbling Under Hot 100 (Billboard)	20
