= VanJess =

American musical duo

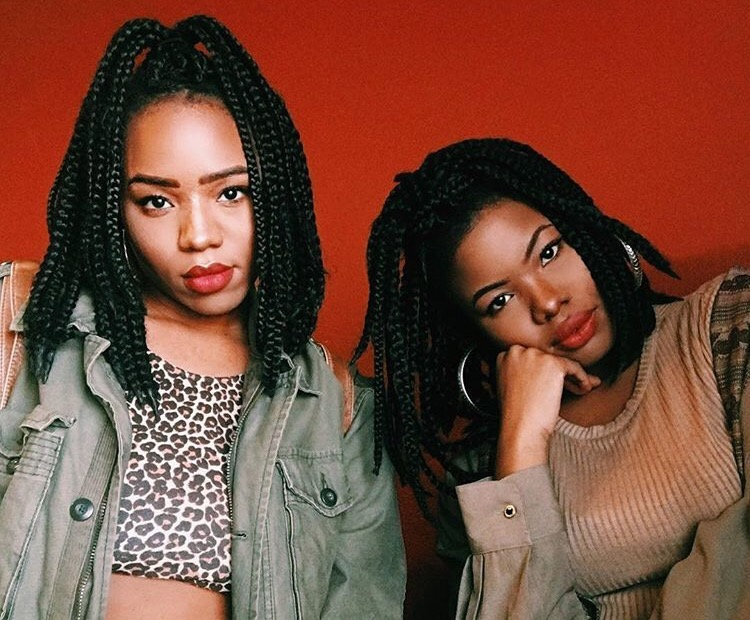
- Left to right: Ivana and Jessica Nwokike

Background information
- Origin: California, U.S.
- Genres: R&B; neo soul
- Years active: 2009–2022
- Label: Keep Cool / RCA
- Past members: Ivana Nwokike; Jessica “AMAKA” Nwokike

VanJess was a Nigerian-American R&B duo composed of sisters Ivana Nwokike and Jessica Nwokike. The duo began their career on YouTube performing cover songs. After one of their videos, a cover of Drake's "Headlines", had viral success, they decided to pursue a serious career in music. In 2011, the duo hired a manager and recorded in a studio for the first time. On November 12, 2018, the group announced that they had signed to the RCA joint venture label Keep Cool. Thus far in their career, VanJess has released one studio album, Silk Canvas, and one EP, Homegrown.

== History ==
The sisters are first-generation Nigerian immigrants of Igbo origin, They were both born in the United States. According to Jessica, they spent 'about eight or nine years' of their childhood in Nigeria, before moving to La Palma, California with their mother, when they were 10 and 8 years old, respectively. They later moved to Cerritos. Jessica and Ivana attended a performing arts elementary school. In middle school and high school, they performed as a duo in talent shows.

They have supported causes like the "Louder than Words" campaign in 2012 and performed at 2013's "Lights Camera Cure" dance-a-thon. They have made appearances on shows like VH1's The Linda Perry Project.

The duo re-released their debut EP 00 till Escape in 2015 which charted in the iTunes top ten and trended worldwide. Their debut album Silk Canvas, an album of original material, was self-released by the duo in 2018. The duo released five singles from the album: "Adore", "Touch the Floor", "Through Enough", "Addicted", "Easy", and "Control Me". The album includes collaborations with Masego, GoldLink, Little Simz, Leikeli47, and Berhana.

They released their EP, Homegrown, on February 5, 2021. The project includes collaborations with Kaytranada, Phony Ppl, Jimi Tents, Garren, and Devin Morrison.

The duo has listed Michael Jackson, Janet Jackson, Xscape, TLC, and SWV as their biggest musical influences. In a 2021 interview with Buzzfeed, they listed Brandy, Toni Braxton, and Whitney Houston as additional influences on their music.

On March 16, 2023, Jessica announced that Ivana had stepped away from VanJess eight months earlier. Jessica also announced that she will continue to make music on her own.

In 2024, Ivana Nwokike formed the musical duo threetwenty with her husband Filip Hunter, a Swedish producer. The pair describe their sound as neo‑soul / R&B with spiritual and autobiographical themes. Their debut album Separate From The Noise was released on December 15, 2025.

== Discography ==
=== Studio albums ===
Title	Details
Silk Canvas	Released: 27 July 2018; Label: Self-released; Format: Digital download, streaming

=== EPs ===
Title	Details
Homegrown	Released: 5 February 2021; Label: Keep Cool, RCA; Format: Digital download, streaming
