= Lady Lady (album) =

Studio album by Masego
- Released: September 7, 2018
- Recorded: 2017–2018
- Genres: R&B; jazz fusion; soul
- Length: 47:45
- Labels: EQT Recordings, LLC
- Producers: Masego (exec.); Kojoa Asamoah; Berg; Oliver Jonas Bergqvist; Jahnei Clarke; Frank Dukes; FKJ; Louis Futon; Dillon Goldberg; Jasper Harris; Hollywood JB; Tk Kayembe; Bigg Kid; Rozwell; Sounwave

Masego chronology
Loose Thoughts (2016)	Lady Lady (2018)	Studying Abroad (2020)

Singles from Lady Lady
- 1. "Tadow" Released: October 17, 2017; 2. "Lady Lady" Released: June 8, 2018; 3. "Old Age" Released: August 24, 2018

Lady Lady is the debut studio album by Jamaican-American singer Masego. It was released on September 7, 2018 by EQT Recordings, LLC.

== Background ==
In an interview with Billboard, Masego refers to the style of this album as TrapHouseJazz, and also said "my previous projects have different energy, and I feel like I've graduated to a more mature version of myself – my beard's almost connected, my man body's comin' in." The album guest-features production from FKJ, SiR, Tiffany Gouché, and De' Wayne Jackson. Production was handled by Masego, Kojoa Asamoah, Jasper, Jah, Justin Bryant, Oliver Jonas Bergqvist, Sounwave, and French Kiwi Juice.

== Promotion and singles ==
After filming a jam session in March, Masego and FKJ released the official single for "Tadow" on October 17, 2017. The song was fully improvised by the musicians during a day-long recording session that took place just after they first met. In celebration of his birthday, the second single "Lady Lady" was released on June 8, 2018. Two weeks before the album, the third single, "Old Age" featuring SiR was released.

== Critical reception ==
Pitchfork gave the album a 7.3 out of 10 saying, "His music is sophisticated, steeped in 1980s quiet-storm R&B with hints of smooth jazz along the fringes," and "Lady Lady is a grand coming-of-age record that displays the playful and reflective halves of Masego, illuminating his versatile nature with the promise of more to come." Exclaim! also gave a positive review of the album saying, "when applied to his music, his penchant for jumping from place to place means big payoffs for his audience. On Lady Lady, no two songs sound alike, although they complement each other perfectly."

== Track listing ==
No.	Title	Writer(s)	Producer(s)	Length
1.	"Silk"	Micah Davis	Masego; Kojo Asamoah	1:13
2.	"I Had a Vision"	Davis	Asamoah; Masego	3:12
3.	"Lavish Lullaby"	Davis	Asamoah; Masego; Frank Dukes; Tk Kayembe	3:17
4.	"Old Age" (featuring Sir)	Davis; Sir Darryl Farris	Jasper Harris; Jahnei Clarke; Masego	2:21
5.	"Prone"	Davis	Hollywood JB; Asamoah; Oliver Jonas Bergqvist; Masego	3:06
6.	"Sugar Walls"	Davis	Asamoah; Masego	2:03
7.	"Queen Tings" (featuring Tiffany Gouché)	Davis; Tiffany Gouché	Bigg Kid; Asamoah; Masego	3:08
8.	"Just a Little" (featuring De' Wayne Jackson)	Davis; De' Wayne Jackson	Masego; Asamoah	4:06
9.	"Shawty Fishin' (Blame the Net)"	Davis	Masego; Asamoah; Rozwell; Berg; Dillon Goldberg	3:32
10.	"Lady Lady"	Davis	Sounwave; Masego	2:34
11.	"24 Hr. Relationship"	Davis	Masego	2:24
12.	"Black Love"	Davis	Louis Futon; Asamoah; Masego	3:42
13.	"Tadow" (featuring FKJ)	Davis; Vincent Fenton	Masego; FKJ	5:01
14.	"Tadow (Extended Version)" (featuring FKJ)	Davis; Fenton	Masego; FKJ	8:05
Total length:				47:45

Notes

- "Lady Lady" contains a sample of "Prototype" performed by Outkast
- "Sugar Walls" contains uncredited vocals from Ari Lennox
- "24 Hr. Relationship" contains uncredited vocals from Kehlani

== Certifications ==
Certifications for "Lady Lady"
Region	Certification	Certified units/sales
Brazil (Pro-Música Brasil)	Gold	20,000^{‡}
^{‡} Sales+streaming figures based on certification alone.
