= Pure Souls =

Song by Kanye West featuring Roddy Ricch and Shenseea

from the album Donda
- Released: August 29, 2021
- Recorded: May 25 – August 2021
- Length: 5:59
- Label: GOOD; Def Jam
- Songwriters: Kanye West; Rodrick Wayne Moore, Jr.; Chinsea Lee; Bastian Völkel; Christoph Bauss; Cydel Charles Young; Dexter Mills; Donny Flores; Jahmal Gwin; Leonard Harris; Malik Yusef; Mark Williams; Mike Dean; Orlando Wilder; Raphael Saadiq; Raul Cubina; Simon David Plummer; Tim Friedrich; Tyshane Thompson; Warren Trotter
- Producers: Kanye West; BoogzDaBeast

"Pure Souls" is a song by American rapper Kanye West from his tenth studio album, Donda (2021). The song features uncredited vocals from fellow American rapper Roddy Ricch and Jamaican singer Shenseea.

The song peaked at No. 52 on the Billboard Hot 100. It has been certified gold by the Recording Industry Association of America (RIAA), denoting sales of over 500,000 units in the United States.

== Background ==
In September 2020, West had a rant on his Twitter account where amongst posting his full recording contract with Universal, he posted a video of him urinating on one of his Grammy awards; captioning the post with "Trust me... I won't stop". Roddy Ricch, who is featured on the track, was nominated for six entries at the 2020 Grammy awards, but left the show empty handed. Roddy Ricch called out West in March 2021, believing that he disrespected the Grammys, saying "How do you think that makes the world look at my accomplishment?". In an interview with Big Boy in June 2021, he stated that he had met up with West and recorded music together and that there was no disrespect towards him. Roddy Ricch references the incident on the song, singing "They said I was mad at the Grammys, but I'm looking at my Grammy right now/Pulled up on Ye and said they don't understand me, I just want my dog to pipe down".

The song was first previewed during a listening party at Mercedes-Benz Stadium on July 22, 2021. At the August 5 listening party, West changed part of his verse, removing lines that alluded to his relationship with Barack Obama such as "44 telling me I'm still not folks". At the August 26 listening party at Soldier Field, West added Jamaican singer Shenseea to the track. The collaboration came about after he had watched her freestyle at Hot 97 with Funkmaster Flex, which was uploaded on July 28, 2021. At the listening event, Shenseea joined West on the stairs of his remade childhood home along with artists such as Travis Scott, Marilyn Manson and DaBaby.

== Personnel ==
Credits adapted from Tidal.

- Co-production - Bastian Völkel, Mike Dean, Ojivolta, Shuko, Sucuki
- Additional production - Fya Man
- Mixing and mastering - Irko
- Record engineering - Alejandro Rodriguez-Dawsøn, Chris Connors, Josh Berg, Mikalai Skrobat, Patrick Hundley, Roark Bailey, Will Chason
- Vocal editing - Chris Connors, Louis Bell

== Charts ==
=== Weekly charts ===
Chart performance for "Pure Souls"
Chart (2021)	Peak position
Australia (ARIA)	37
Canada Hot 100 (Billboard)	46
Global 200 (Billboard)	45
Lithuania (AGATA)	80
Portugal (AFP)	96
South Africa (TOSAC)	26
Sweden (Sverigetopplistan)	83
UK Hip Hop/R&B (Official Charts)	14
US Billboard Hot 100	52
US Hot Christian Songs (Billboard)	12
US Gospel Songs (Billboard)	10
US Hot R&B/Hip-Hop Songs (Billboard)	25

=== Year-end charts ===
2021 year-end chart performance for "Pure Souls"
Chart (2021)	Position
US Christian Songs (Billboard)	47
US Gospel Songs (Billboard)	14

== Certifications ==
Certifications and sales for Pure Souls
Region	Certification	Certified units/sales
United States (RIAA)	Gold	500,000^{‡}
^{‡} Sales+streaming figures based on certification alone.
