= Kite (Benjamin Ingrosso song) =

2024 single by Benjamin Ingrosso

Single by Benjamin Ingrosso

from the album Pink Velvet Theatre
- Released: 26 January 2024
- Length: 2:46
- Label: EMI Music
- Songwriters: Benjamin Ingrosso; Salem Al Fakir; Anya Jones; Vincent Pontare; Jon Shave
- Producers: Wille Enblad; Jon Shave; Vargas & Lagola

Benjamin Ingrosso singles chronology
"I Had It All and Let It Go" (2023)	"Kite" (2024)	"Better Days" (2024)

Music video
- "Kite" on YouTube

"Kite" is a song by Swedish singer Benjamin Ingrosso. It was released on 26 January 2024 as the lead single from his fifth studio album, Pink Velvet Theatre. It peaked at number 1 on the Swedish chart.

Ingrosso said "For me, 'Kite' is about the first time you meet someone new and the feeling you get that anything is possible, the euphoria and freedom you feel when you meet someone who makes you feel like you're soaring high above everyone else."

== Critical reception ==
Podcart said "'Kite' encapsulates the thrill of an enchanting journey where life feels vibrant, endlessly exciting, and love waits just around the corner. Ingrosso's crystalline falsetto effortlessly glides above lush production, with the singer noting he's never been more excited to share his music."

== Track listings ==
Original
No.	Title	Length
1.	"Kite"	2:46

Acoustic
No.	Title	Length
1.	"Kite" (acoustic) (with Astrid S.)	2:29

with Olly Alexander
No.	Title	Length
1.	"Kite" (with Olly Alexander)	2:46

remixes
No.	Title	Length
1.	"Kite" (Majestic remix)	2:32
2.	"Kite" (Doctum remix)	5:22

== Charts ==
=== Weekly charts ===
Weekly chart performance for "Kite"
Chart (2024)	Peak position
CIS Airplay (TopHit)	118
Russia Airplay (TopHit)	87
San Marino (SMRRTV Top 50)	13
Sweden (Sverigetopplistan)	1

=== Year-end charts ===
Year-end chart performance for "Kite"
Chart (2024)	Position
Sweden (Sverigetopplistan)	12

== Certifications ==
Certifications for "Kite"
Region	Certification	Certified units/sales
Sweden (GLF)	Platinum	12,000,000^{†}
^{†} Streaming-only figures based on certification alone.

== See also ==
- List of number-one singles of the 2020s (Sweden)
