= Masego (musician) =

Jamaican musician (born 1993)

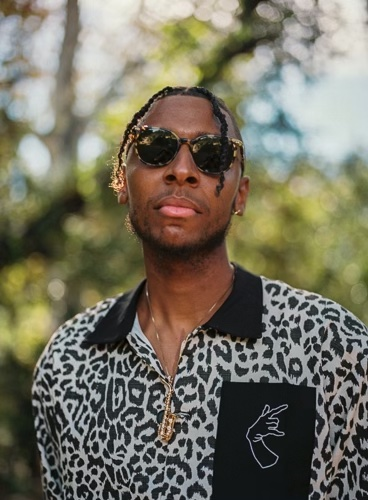
- Masego in 2023.

Background information
- Born: Micah Davis; June 8, 1993 (age 33); Kingston, Jamaica
- Genres: Trap; jazz; hip-hop; R&B
- Occupations: Musician; singer; record producer
- Instruments: Saxophone; drums; guitar; synthesizer; vocals
- Years active: 2013–present
- Labels: EQT Recordings, LLC.
- Website: www.masegomusic.com

Micah Davis (born June 8, 1993), known professionally as Masego (/məˈseɪɡoʊ/ mə-SAY-goh), is a Jamaican and American musician and singer, known for incorporating the saxophone into his music. Masego released two EPs in 2016, The Pink Polo EP with Medasin, and Loose Thoughts. He gained widespread attention with his collaborative record with FKJ called "Tadow" released in 2017. In 2018, he released his debut album Lady Lady. His album Studying Abroad: Extended Stay was nominated for the 2022 Grammy Awards in the "Best Progressive R&B Album" category.

== Early life and education ==
Micah Davis was born June 8, 1993, to a Jamaican father and an African-American mother. His father was in the U.S. Air Force and his mother was an entrepreneur, he was raised with his two sisters. One is also a musical artist and the other is involved in voice acting and media outlets. He also has a brother in law. Both his mother and father were pastors although he was raised in a non-denominational Christian home. Military travels eventually led his family to Virginia, but he also lived in Sumter, South Carolina for a couple of years. He first learned how to play the drums without formal lessons in his youth. Davis has spoken about learning the piano, sax, and various drum machines. In high school, Davis adopted the name Masego, a Setswana translation of his church name "blessing". Davis attended Woodside High School in Newport News, Virginia and Old Dominion University in Norfolk, Virginia before leaving to focus solely on his musical career.

== Music career ==
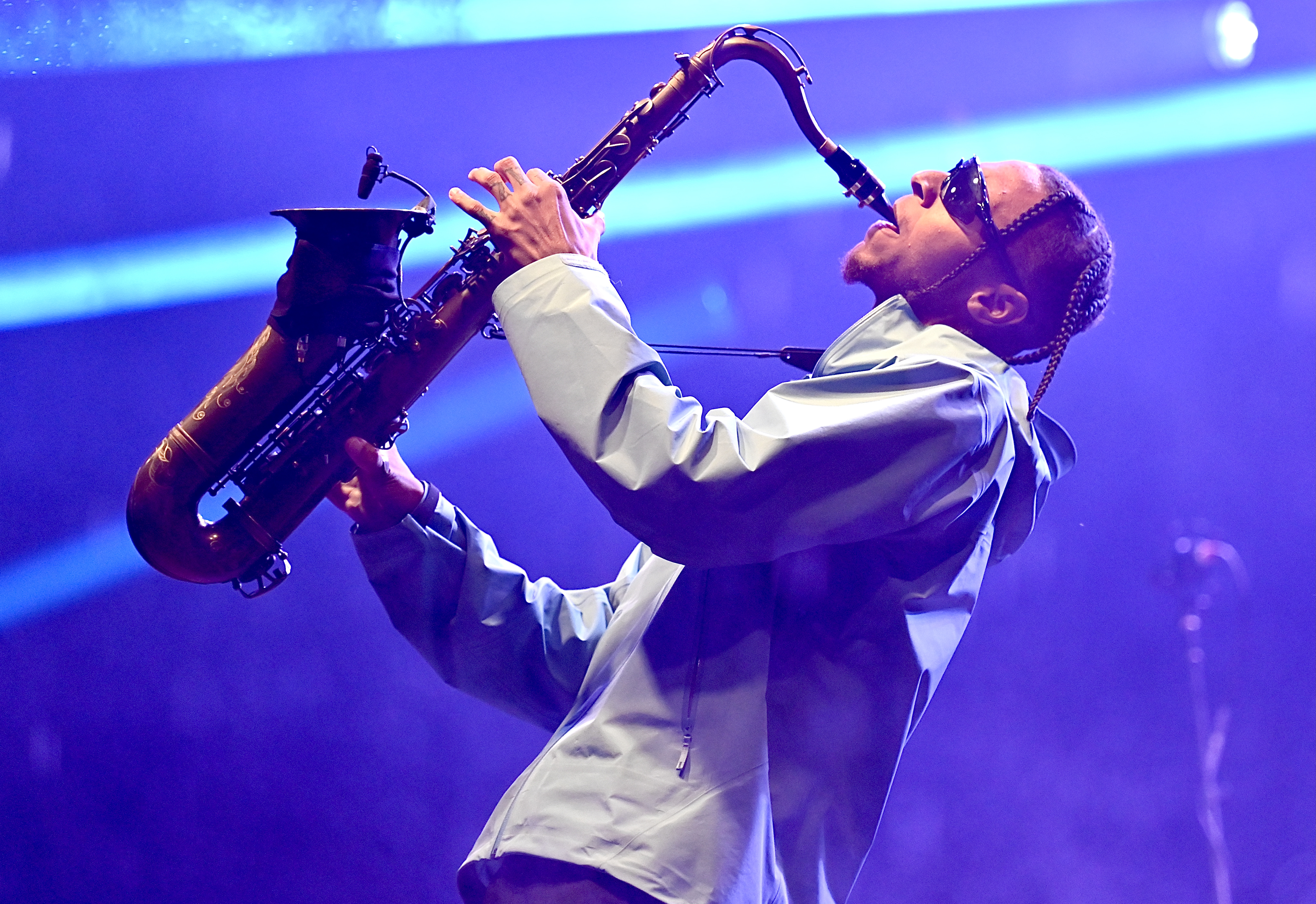
Masego performing in 2023.

In 2015, Masego released the collaborative extended play, The Pink Polo EP with Medasin, spawning the single "Girls That Dance". The next year, he released his EP Loose Thoughts.

In 2017, he met French artist FKJ, and the two released the track "Tadow". According to FKJ, the song was fully improvised not long after meeting.

On September 7, 2018, he released his debut album Lady Lady, including guest features from FKJ, SiR, Tiffany Gouché, and De' Wayne Jackson. The album featured the previously released "Tadow" as its lead single.

His EP, Studying Abroad was released on November 13, 2020. Masego released his self-titled album on March 3, 2023.

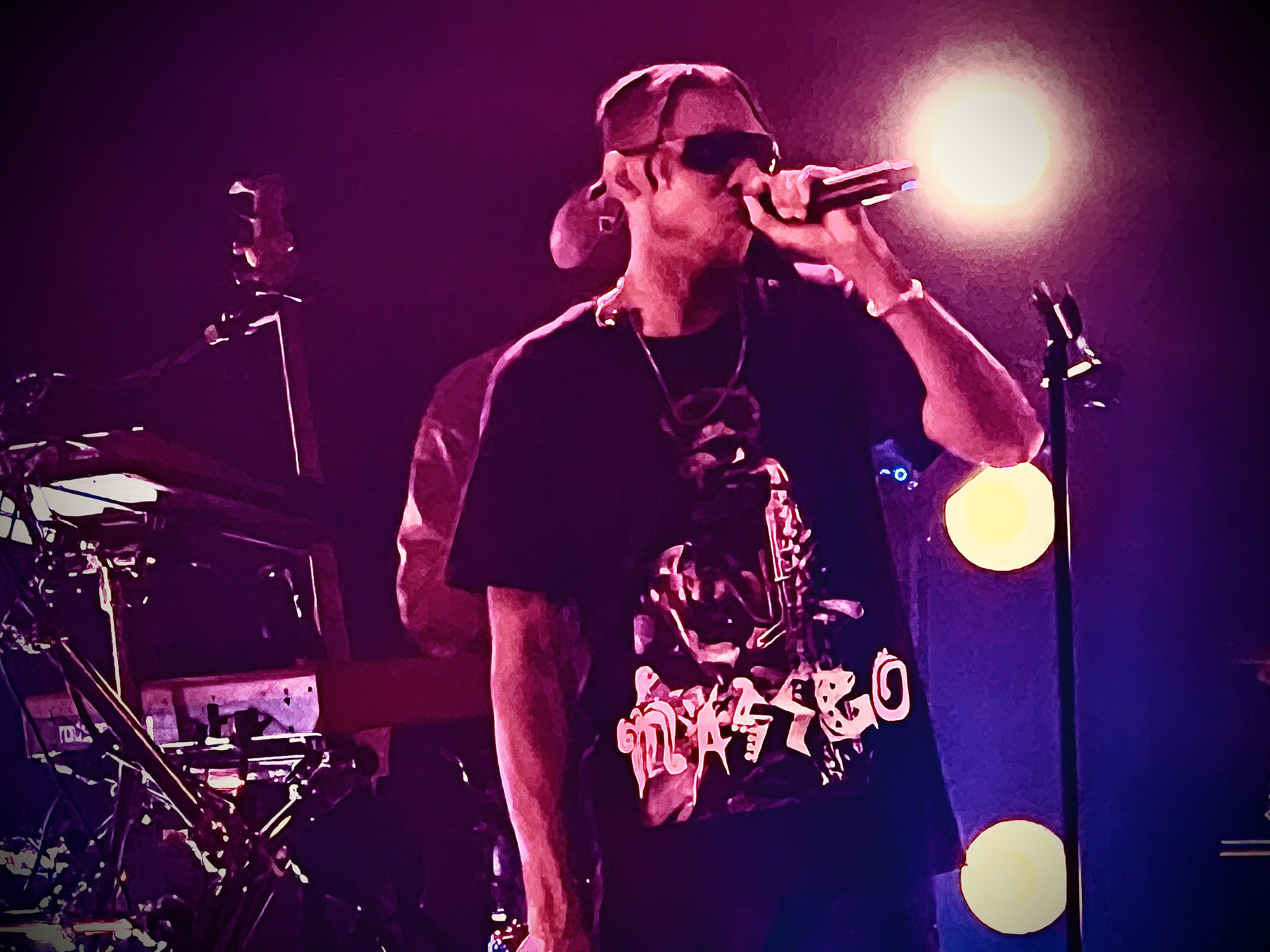
Masego 2023 at Wiltern Venue

== Musical style and influences ==
Drawing from his upbringing of both his parents being pastors, Davis stated that church allowed him a place to learn music from talented musicians. Davis also cited Lukky (DJ PLM), John P. Kee, Andre 3000 and Cab Calloway as influences. Davis grew up in a room with over 200 vinyl records on the walls while simultaneously having friends giving him hard hitting drums and trap music influences. He refers to his own musical style as "TrapHouse Jazz".

== Discography ==
=== Studio albums ===
List of extended plays, with selected details
Title	Album details
Lady Lady	Released: September 7, 2018; Label: EQT Recordings; Format: Digital download, streaming
Masego	Released: March 3, 2023; Label: UMG Recordings, EQT Recordings, Capitol Records; Format: Digital download, streaming
Fix Your Face	Released: July 17, 2026; Label: UMG Recordings, EQT Recordings, Capitol Records; Format: Digital download, streaming

=== Extended plays ===
List of extended plays, with selected details
Title	EP details
The Pink Polo EP (with Medasin)	Released: April 5, 2015; Label: TrapHouseJazz; Format: Digital download
Loose Thoughts	Released: July 27, 2016; Label: TrapHouseJazz; Format: Digital download
Studying Abroad	Released: November 13, 2020; Deluxe: May 21, 2021; Label: UMG, EQT Recordings, LLC; Format: Digital download

=== Mixtapes ===
- Blessing (January 30, 2013)
- Masego Music (June 1, 2013)
- Better with Headphones (May 29, 2014)
- Traphouse Jazz (December 12, 2014)

=== Singles ===
List of singles, with year released, selected chart positions and certifications
Title	Year	Peak chart positions			Certification	Album
Title	Year	US R&B	US Adult R&B	NZ Hot	Certification	Album
"Tadow" (with FKJ)	2017	—	19	—	RIAA: Platinum; RMNZ: 3× Platinum	Lady Lady
"Mystery Lady" (with Don Toliver)	2020	24	24	—	RIAA: Gold	Studying Abroad
"My City" (with Elhae)	2021	—	—	—		Aura III
"Yamz" (with Devin Morrison)	2021	—	14	—		Non-album singles
"Unhinged"	2025	—	—	30		Non-album singles
"Breathe"	2026	—	—	39		Non-album singles
"—" denotes a recording that did not chart or was not released.

=== Other charted songs ===
List of songs, with year released, selected chart positions and certifications
Title	Year	Peak chart positions	Album
Title	Year	US R&B	Album
"Hate the Club" (Kehlani featuring Masego)	2020	18	It Was Good Until It Wasn't

=== Other guest appearances ===
List of non-single guest appearances, with other performing artists, showing year released and album name
Title	Year	Other artist(s)	Album
"Late Night"	2015	GoldLink	And After That, We Didn't Talk
"Ooh Nah Nah"	2017	SiR	HER TOO
"Touch the Floor"	2018	VanJess	Silk Canvas
"Good Girl"	2018	Tiffany Gouché	Non-album single
"One Life"	2019	The Game, J. Stone	Born 2 Rap
"Need It"	2019	Kaytranada	Bubba
"Sleigh"	2019	Smino, Monte Booker	High 4 Da Highladays
"Amy"	2019	Yuna	Rouge
"Surf"	2020	Xaviar Omar	If You Feel
"Golden Ticket"	2020	Brasstracks, Common	Golden Ticket
"Judas"	2020	Spillage Village, Chance the Rapper	Spilligion
"Slow Down"	2020	Ro James	Mantic
"Above"	2020	USERx	USERx EP
"Stickin'"	2021	Sinéad Harnett, VanJess	Ready Is Always Too Late
"Somethin' Ain't Right"	2021	JID, Rapsody	Judas and the Black Messiah: The Inspired Album
"Must Be Nice"	2021	Joyce Wrice	Overgrown
"Silk"	2022	Kojey Radical	Reason to Smile
"Black Folk"	2022	Tank and the Bangas, Alex Isley	Red Balloon
"Marching Band"	2023	Yussef Dayes	Black Classical Music
"Lucid Dreams"	2023	Leon Thomas III	Mutt
"Super Paradise"	2023	Destin Conrad	Submissive
"90s"	2023	Braxton Cook	Who Are You When No One Is Watching?
"A Song for Mom"	2024	Mustard, Ty Dolla Sign, Charlie Wilson	Faith of a Mustard Seed

== Production discography ==
=== 2016 ===
Masego & Medasin – The Pink Polo EP

- 08. "Love Be Like (Medasin Remix)"

Masego – Loose Thoughts

- All tracks (guest 'ghost' producer Lukky, DJ PLM)

=== 2018 ===
VanJess – Silk Canvas

- 03. "Touch the Floor"

Masego – Lady Lady

- All tracks

=== 2019 ===
Ari Lennox – Shea Butter Baby

- 04. "Up Late"

=== 2021 ===
Judas and the Black Messiah: The Inspired Album

- 08. "Somethin' Ain't Right" (Masego featuring JID and Rapsody)

Drake – Certified Lover Boy

- 01. "Champagne Poetry"
