= Berhana =

American singer

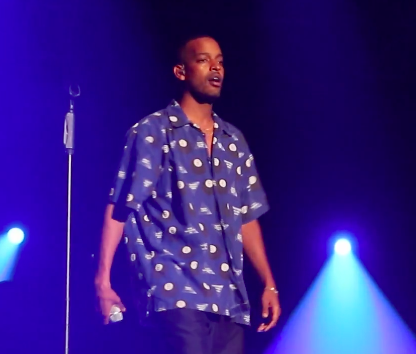

Background information
- Born: Amain Berhane; Atlanta, Georgia
- Genres: R&B, pop, soul, rap
- Years active: 2016-present
- Website: http://www.berhana.com

Amain Berhane, better known as Berhana, is an American singer-songwriter.

== History ==
Amain Berhane was born near Atlanta, Georgia in an Ethiopian family. Growing up, he wrote songs and sang in church. He studied screenwriting at The New School in New York City, and there started to realize music was something he wanted to pursue more seriously. His self-titled EP was self-released in 2016. His song "Grey Luh" from the album was featured on Donald Glover's Atlanta. During this time Berhane was also a Japanese chef for several years. Berhana was listed in Variance Magazine as one of the "10 acts we can't wait to see at Pitchfork Festival 2018."

== Artistry ==
Berhana grew up listening to his Ethiopian parents' music as well as Sam Cooke, Erykah Badu, and Stevie Wonder. He was also greatly influenced by Michael Jackson's Moonwalker and Rock With You. About his EP he said, "I wanted something that felt like the inside of my mom's house—almost like a documentary." In two of his songs, ‘‘Wade Green’’ and ‘‘Brooklyn Drugs’’ he introduced Amharic vocals. Two years later, in 2018, Berhana followed up with Hunger TV, saying "I think that seeps in to all my music – I want people to feel like they’re there with me, in the moment, while I’m thinking the things that I’m singing about."

Berhana released his debut album, Han, on October 18, 2019 via EQT Recordings. The project features singles "Health Food", "Lucky Strike", and "I Been (ft. Crush)." In November 2020 he released a remix of song "Golden" titled "Golden Pt. 2 (with Mereba)." In October 2023, he released Amén የዘላን ህልም (The Nomad’s Dream).

== Discography ==
=== EPs ===
- Berhana (2016)

=== Albums ===
- HAN (2019)
- Amén: የዘላን ህልም (The Nomad’s Dream) (2023)
