= Pink Velvet Theatre =

Studio album by Benjamin Ingrosso
- Released: 25 October 2024
- Length: 38:39
- Language: English
- Label: EMI

Benjamin Ingrosso chronology
Allt det vackra (Live från Dalhalla) (2023)	Pink Velvet Theatre (2024)

Singles from Pink Velvet Theatre
- 1. "Kite" Released: 26 January 2024; 2. "Better Days" Released: 5 April 2024; 3. "Look Who's Laughing Now" Released: 14 June 2024; 4. "All My Life" Released: 9 August 2024; 5. "Back to You" Released: 1 November 2024; 6. "Angela" Released: 2 May 2025

Pink Velvet Theatre is the fifth studio album by Swedish singer and songwriter Benjamin Ingrosso. It was announced in August 2024, alongside its fourth single, "All My Life". The album was released on 25 October 2024 and peaked at number 1 on the Swedish charts.

== Critical reception ==
Professional ratings
Review scores
Source	Rating
Aftonbladet	4/5 stars
Dagens industri	4/5
Dagens Nyheter	3/5
Gaffa	5/6 stars
Göteborgs-Posten	4/5 stars
Hymn	7/10
Sveriges Radio P1	3/5 stars
Sydsvenskan	3/5

Broadway World called the album "pure pop perfection". They said "The album title perfectly captures the mood of Benjamin Ingrosso's surreal universe—a kaleidoscopic space filled with intense emotions and vivid imagery. Each track acts as a chapter in the protagonist's journey, showcasing the artist's distinctive blend of pop, influenced by the grandeur of old-school musicals and the timeless sounds of legends like the Bee Gees, Queen and Elton John." Culture Fix listed the album on the top spot of their best albums of the year, sharing "every track on the album could stand as a fantastic single in its own right," adding "Ingrosso has reached new artistic and creative heights."

== Track listing ==
No.	Title	Writer(s)	Producer(s)	Length
1.	"...And So It Begins"	Benjamin Ingrosso; Salem Al Fakir; Dennis Bröchner; Anya Jones; Vincent Pontare	Benjamin Ingrosso; Salem Al Fakir; Wille Enblad; Hampus Lindvall; Viktor Olsen; Vincent Pontare; Joel Strömgren	0:56
2.	"Kite"	Ingrosso; Al Fakir; Jones; Pontare; Jon Shave	Enblad; Jon Shave; Vargas & Lagola	2:45
3.	"1 in 1,000,000"	Ingrosso; Christopher Collins; Jones; Max Wassen; Jacob Werner; Zikai	Ingrosso; Enblad; Pontare; Jacob Werner	0:27
4.	"Angela"	Ingrosso; Collins; Enblad; Jones; Pontare; Wassen; Werner; Zikai	Ingrosso; Enblad; Pontare; Jacob Werner	4:12
5.	"Honey Boy" (with Purple Disco Machine featuring Shenseea and Nile Rodgers)	Ingrosso; Jones; Chinsea Linda Lee; Lindvall; Nile Rodgers; Tino Schmidt	Purple Disco Machine; Lindvall; Rodgers
6.	"Look Who's Laughing Now"	Ingrosso; Jessica Agombar; David Stewart	David Stewart	2:52
7.	"PVT?"	Ingrosso; Al Fakir; Timothy Collins; Pontare	Ingrosso; Mattias Bylund; Enblad; Pontare	1:28
8.	"Better Days"	Ingrosso; Al Fakir; Jones; Pontare	Enblad; Vargas & Lagola	3:38
9.	"All My Life (and then)"	Ingrosso; Al Fakir; Jones; Pontare	Ingrosso; Al Fakir; Lucas Albrektsson; Enblad; Pontare	4:35
10.	"Iknow, Iknow"	Ingrosso; Al Fakir; Pontare; Zikai	Ingrosso; Al Fakir; Enblad; Pontare	3:53
11.	"All the Stars (interlude)"	Ingrosso; Al Fakir; Pontare	Ingrosso; Al Fakir; Albrektsson; Enblad; Pontare	0:24
12.	"Back to you"	Ingrosso; Al Fakir; Pontare	Ingrosso; Al Fakir; Albrektsson; Enblad; Pontare	3:23
13.	"Worst in Me"	Ingrosso; Kirstin Carpenter; Gustav Nyström	Ingrosso; Enblad; Gustav Jonsson; Pontare	4:01
14.	"So This Is Love?"	Ingrosso; Al Fakir; Bylund; Dennis Bröchner; Pontare	Ingrosso; Bylund; Enblad; Lindvall; Pontare	2:14
Total length:				38:39

== The Book ==
In May 2025, the book Pink Velvet Theatre: Drömmarens sökande efter sanningen was released.. In english The Dreamer's Search for the Truth. The book is based on the album, but it does not follow the album's original track list. The book is written by the Swedish girl Bea Magnstedt

== Charts ==
=== Weekly charts ===
Weekly chart performance for Pink Velvet Theatre
Chart (2024)	Peak position
Norwegian Albums (VG-lista)	21
Swedish Albums (Sverigetopplistan)	1

=== Year-end charts ===
Year-end chart performance for Pink Velvet Theatre
Chart (2025)	Position
Swedish Albums (Sverigetopplistan)	87

== Certifications ==
Certifications for Pink Velvet Theatre
Region	Certification	Certified units/sales
Sweden (GLF)	Gold	15,000^{‡}
^{‡} Sales+streaming figures based on certification alone.

== Awards and nominations ==
=== Grammis ===
Year	Nominee / work	Award	Result	Ref.
2025	"Honey Boy"	Song of the Year	Won	
2025	Pink Velvet Theatre	Album of the Year	Won	
2025	Pink Velvet Theatre	Pop of the Year	Nominated	

=== QX Gaygalan Awards ===
Year	Nominee / work	Award	Result	Ref.
2025	"Honey Boy"	Song of the Year	Won	
