= FO&O (album) =

Studio album by FO&O
- Released: 12 May 2017
- Recorded: 2013–2016
- Length: 42:36
- Label: The Artist House

FO&O chronology
Coordinates (2015)	FO&O (2017)

Singles from FO&O
- 1. "Gotta Thing About You" Released: 26 February 2017; 2. "So So Good" Released: 5 May 2017

FO&O is the second studio album by Swedish boy band FO&O. It was released in Sweden by The Artist House on 12 May 2017. The album peaked at number 35 on the Swedish Albums Chart.

== Singles ==
"Gotta Thing About You" was released as the lead single from the album on 26 February 2017. The song peaked at number 7 on the Swedish Singles Chart. It took part in Melodifestivalen 2017, and qualified for the Final; it finished in 8th place. "So So Good" was released as the second single from the album on 5 May 2017.

== Track listing ==
FO&O track listing
No.	Title	Writer(s)	Producer(s)	Length
1.	"Gotta Thing About You"	Robert John "Mutt" Lange; Tony Nilsson	Nilsson	2:56
2.	"Good Life"	Ellen Stokstad; David Husberg; Felix Sandman; Oscar Enestad	Husberg	2:52
3.	"Summer Love"	Sara Hjellström; Nirob Islam; Fredrik Danielson; Omar Rudberg; Andrew Taggart	Hjellström; Islam; Danielson; Taggart	2:38
4.	"If I Had"	Herbie Crichlow; Robert Habolin; Linnea Södahl; Samuel Kvist	Nanno Veen; Simon Sjöstedt	2:43
5.	"So So Good"	Sandman; Rudberg; Enestad; David "Strääf" Solence; Carnell Jabar Cross Jr.	Tune Flow; Crack Dave	2:13
6.	"Hurt Like We Did"	Mattias Andréasson; Albin Johnsén; Jerker Olov Hansson	Olov	3:08
7.	"Teenage Talking"	Sandman; Enestad; Stokstad; Husberg	Husberg	2:52
8.	"Love Like This"	Joy Deb; Linnea Deb; Anton Hård af Segerstad; Nate Cyphert	The Family	3:00
9.	"My Girl"	Kvist; Daniel Ledinsky; Timothy Caifeldt; Erik Hassle	Sam Crow	3:09
10.	"Who Doesn't Love Love"	Rudberg; Habolin; Hansson	Tune Flow	2:36
11.	"Loop"	Sandman; Enestad; Danielson	Husberg; Danielson	3:22
12.	"Notice"	Sandman; Rudberg; Enestad; Alexander Mood; Johan Thölin; Louice Lindberg	Thuglin; Pug	2:39
13.	"Run with Us"	Emanuel Abrahamsson; Hansson; Simon Hassle; Louise Lennartsson	Email	2:32
14.	"Buzzkill"	Rami Yacoub; Carl Falk; Gavin Jones; Ludwig Lindell; Daniel Caesar	Falk	2:53
15.	"Build a Girl"	Crichlow; Drew Ryan Scott; Jolleen Belle; Louis Schoorl	Karl Johan Råsmark	3:03
Total length:				42:36

== Charts ==
Chart performance for FO&O
Chart (2017)	Peak position
Swedish Albums (Sverigetopplistan)	35

== Release history ==
Release history for FO&O
Region	Date	Format	Label
Sweden	12 May 2017	Digital download	The Artist House
