= Oscar Enestad =

Swedish singer

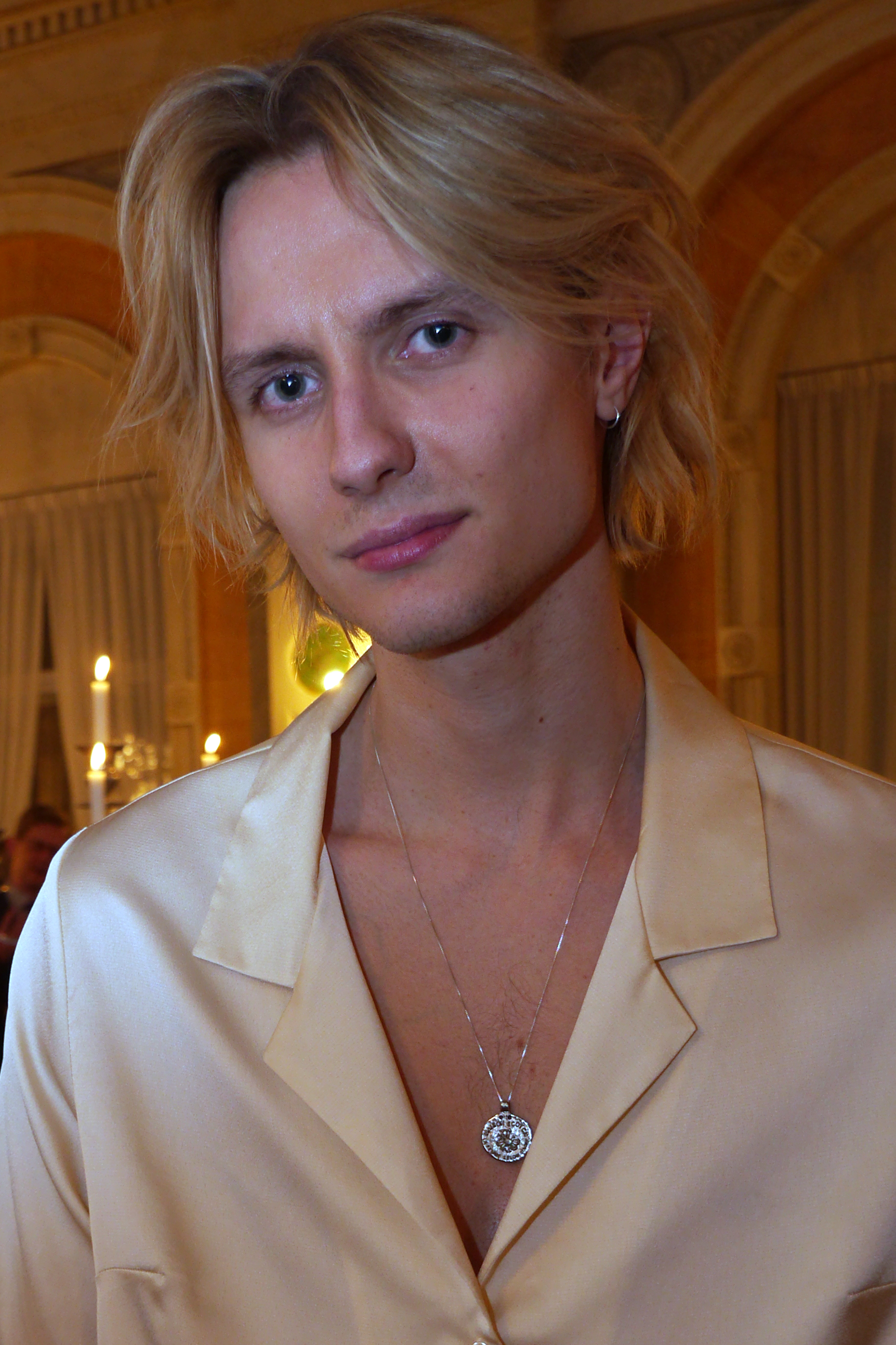
- Enestad at Melodifestivalen 2019

Background information
- Born: Oscar Johan Ingvar Enestad; 21 February 1997 (age 29); Sköndal, Stockholm, Sweden
- Genres: Pop, soul
- Occupation: Singer
- Years active: 2013–present
- Label: TEN
- Formerly of: FO&O

Oscar Johan Ingvar Enestad (born 21 February 1997) is a Swedish singer. He was a member of the boyband FO&O between 2013 and 2017. He participated in Melodifestivalen 2017 broadcast on SVT along with the band, making it to the final with the song "Gotta Thing About You". In 2017, the band revealed that they were going on a hiatus. Enestad launched his solo career in 2018, by revealing that he would participate in Melodifestivalen 2019 with the song "I Love It".

== Discography ==
=== Albums with FO&O ===
Title	Details	Peak chart positions
Title	Details	SWE
Credited to The Fooo
Off the Grid	Released: 2 April 2014; Format: Digital download, CD; Label: The Artist House	1
Credited to FO&O
FO&O	Released: 12 May 2017; Format: Digital download, CD; Label: The Artist House	33

=== Singles (solo) ===
Title	Year	Peak chart positions	Album
Title	Year	SWE	Album
"Heaven on My Skin"	2018	—	“Drömmar” 2022
"Sign of My Love"	2019	—	“Drömmar” 2022
"I Love It"	2019	13	“Drömmar” 2022
"Vi var som inga andra"	2019	—	“Drömmar” 2022
"Sänker våra glas på innergården"	2020	—	“Drömmar” 2022
"Sorger"	2020	—	“Drömmar” 2022
"16 år"	2020	—	“Drömmar” 2022
"Se På Oss Nu"	2020	—	“Drömmar” 2022
"Svarta Moln" (featuring Chili)	2021	—	“Drömmar” 2022

==== As featured artist ====
Title	Year
"Aska" (Klara & Jag featuring Oscar Enestad)	2020
