= 2011 in Swedish music =

The following is a list of notable events and releases of the year 2011 in Swedish music.

== Events ==
=== March ===
- 12 – Eric Saade wins Melodifestivalen 2011 with his entry "Popular", he will represent Sweden in the Eurovision Song Contest 2011 in Düsseldorf, Germany.

=== April ===
- 6 – Per Wiberg quits Opeth.

=== May ===
- 12 – Eric Saade wins the second semi-final in the Eurovision Song Contest 2011 in Düsseldorf, Germany.
- 14 – Eric Saade comes third in the final of the Eurovision Song Contest 2011, Sweden best placement since 1999 when Sweden won.
- 18
  - Lady Gaga releases her new CD Born This Way Exclusively on the Swedish Music Streaming Program Spotify
  - Adrian Lux signs with Universal Music Sweden.

=== June ===
- 8 – The 19th Sweden Rock Festival started in Norje (June 8 – 11).
- 28 – The Where The Action Is festival started in Gothenburg.

=== July ===
- 9 – Sonisphere In Globe Arena Stockholm.
- 28 – Storsjöyran in Östersund (July 28 – 30).

=== August ===
- 11 – Way Out West City festival in Gothenburg (August 11 – 13).

== Albums released ==
=== January ===
- 11 – Öga, Näsa, Mun Single by Dungen (Third Man Records).

=== February ===
- February 11 – Charm School is released which is Roxette's first album with new material since 2001's Room Service
- February 14 – Love CPR by September (singer) is released
- February 23 – Carl Norén from Sugar Plum Fairy releases his solo debut album Owls.
- February 23 – Thomas Di Leva releases his album Hjärtat vinner alltid
- February 28 – Mohombi releases his Debut album MoveMeant (various dates in Europe)
- February 28 – Roxette start its Charm School World Tour in Kazan, Rusia in front of 8.000 people. The tour will include all continents, including dates in the United States

=== March ===
- March 2 – Lykke Li releases her second album Wounded Rhymes
- March 9 – Swingfly releases Awesomeness – An Introduction to Swingfly
- March 11 – Danny Saucedo Releases In The Club
- March 15 – Bob Hund releases Det Överexponerade Gömstället
- 16
  - Miss Li releases – Beats & Bruises
  - Unseen by The Haunted
- March 23 – Erik Hassle releases Mariefred Sessions
- 29 – Surtur Rising by Amon Amarth

=== April ===
- April 13
  - Kikki Danielsson releases "Första dagen på resten av mitt liv".
  - Adam Tensta releases Scared Of The Dark
- April 15 – Performocracy by The Poodles is released
- 15
  - Newkid releases Alexander JR Ferrer
  - The Unseen Empire by Scar Symmetry
- April 16 – Eva Eastwood – Lyckost
- April 27 – Veronica Maggio Releases her third album Satan i Gatan

=== May ===
- 30 – Khaos Legions by Arch Enemy

=== June ===
- June 8 – Timbuktu releases his eighth album, Sagolandet
- June 15 – In Flames release their tenth album Sounds of a Playground Fading
- June 29 – Eric Saade releases his second solo album Saade with the Eurovision song contest entry as lead single.

=== July ===
- July 27 – Takida release their album The Burning Heart.

=== September ===
- 16 – Heritage by Opeth
- 23 – Hell in Reverse by Last View

=== November ===
- 7 – For Funerals to Come... (reissue) by Katatonia

=== Unknown date ===
#

A

Agnes Carlsson TBA

E

Europe (band) – TBA

E-Type – TBA

G

Gathania – TBA, Swedish IDOL contestant 2007 was reported working on material for 2011

== New Artists ==
- Eric Amarillo – Swedish singer from Gothenburg SwEric Amarillo, musician, producer and DJ part of the duo The Attic with Michael Feiner
- Newkid – Swedish singer from Stockholm released debut album
