= Erik Hassle =

Swedish singer and songwriter

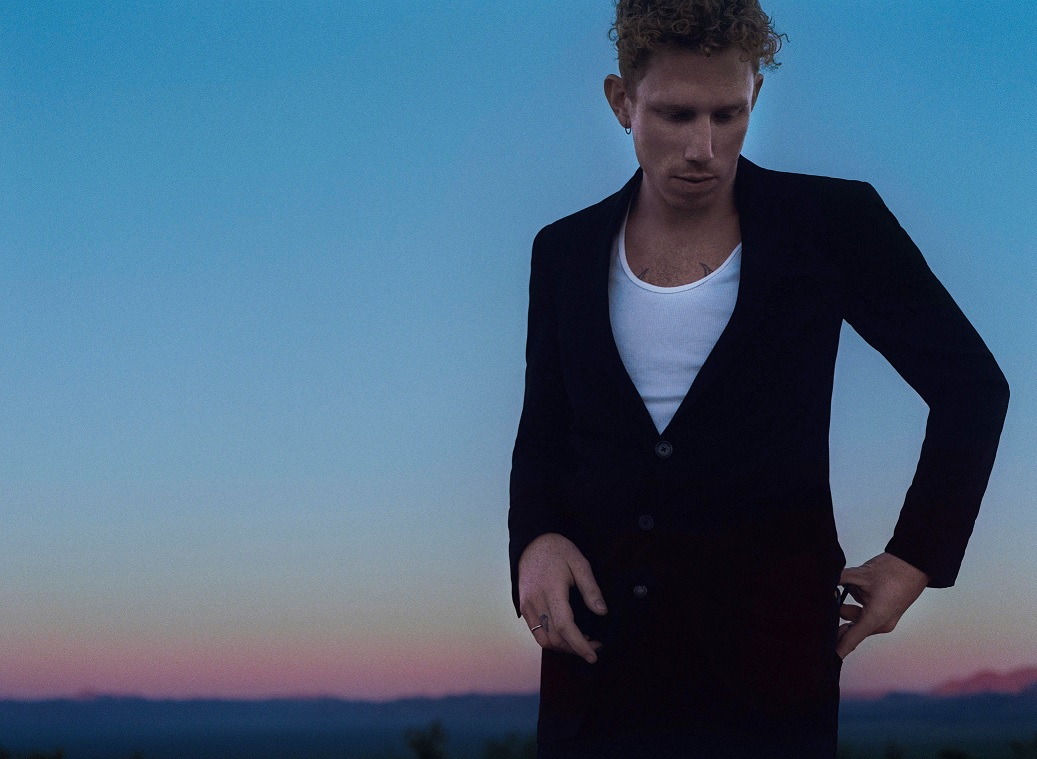
- Erik Hassle in January 2020

Background information
- Born: Kaj Erik Persson Hassle; 26 August 1988 (age 37); Salem Municipality, Sweden
- Genres: Pop
- Occupations: Singer, songwriter
- Years active: 2005–present
- Labels: TEN (Sweden); Roxy (Sweden); Island (UK); Universal Republic (U.S.); RCA
- Website: www.erikhassle.com

Kaj Erik Persson Hassle (born 26 August 1988) is a Swedish pop singer and songwriter. His career started in 2008 with his first single, "Hurtful", which eventually reached No. 11 in Sweden and peaked at No. 2 in Denmark. His most successful single to date, "No Words", reached the Top 10 of the Global and U.S. Spotify Viral Chart and achieved Gold certification in both Sweden and Denmark.

Hassle, who signed to Island Records in 2009, has released four albums, most recently Innocence Lost in January 2017. Aside from solo work, he has cowritten a number of songs for other singers, including Shakira and Rihanna's "Can't Remember to Forget You". He won a Danish Gaffa award and two Swedish awards, a Grammis and a P3 Guld.

Saluted as "the new, young Robbie Williams" upon his international debut, Hassle has been described as "a voice steeped in simmering sultry soul, a funked-up sense of international swagger, and unbridled lyrical honesty."

== Early life ==
Hassle was born in Salem Municipality, Stockholm. He was raised in the village of Bie near Katrineholm, where local musicians gathered in his parents' village theater. He grew up listening to Swedish punk and American soul and realised his love of music early after listening to Wilson Pickett. He was introduced to British New Wave at Rytmus, the musical secondary school in Stockholm attended by Robyn and Tove Lo (whom he would later support on her North American tour), where he met his manager at the age of 17. He signed a deal with the Swedish music company TEN Music Group in 2007, becoming their first signed artist. The label would later be credited with reviving Swedish pop music.

He was one of the finalists in the talent contest Metro Music Challenge in 2008. He wrote music and self-produced videos, spreading them online via X5 Music, YouTube and Myspace.

== Music career ==
=== 2008–2010: First releases and recognition ===
Hassle released his first single, "Hurtful", in September 2008. It would become a sleeper hit over the years, eventually reaching No. 11 in his native Sweden and peaking at No. 2 in Denmark.

In March 2009, when he did not have an album out yet, Hassle signed for Island Records in London for worldwide rights excluding North America and Sweden, where the Swedish label Roxy Recordings had already signed Hassle for two albums. The Guardian picked up the story, calling him "the Stockholm wunderkind," comparing him to Frankmusik, Keane and Ross Copperman, and wondering if he was "the new, young Robbie Williams." In August, he published his album Hassle, which debuted at No. 2 and stayed in the Swedish charts for 10 weeks. He immediately released his second single, "Don't Bring Flowers", which peaked at No. 25 in Sweden.

Together with Ellie Goulding, Hassle released an acoustic version of Robyn's "Be Mine!". In late 2009 he embarked on touring outside of Sweden and released "Hurtful" in the UK on 2 February 2010. It debuted at No. 59 and fell off the charts the following week. He reworked and re-released his debut album as Pieces in the UK. It failed to chart in the UK Albums Chart. The album's lack of success was later described as "the greatest pop injustice of the last several years." Popjustice placed it at No. 11 of its top albums of 2009.

On 19 January 2010, Hassle appeared at the Danish X Factor finals and the P3 Guld gala, where he was awarded the prize for "Newcomer of the Year 2009". He won the Newcomer Prize at the Swedish Grammis in the same year. Finally, he won the 2010 Danish Gaffa Prize for the International Newcomer of the Year. He toured with Mika, Broods, and MØ.

In May 2010, "Hurtful" was picked as Single of the Week in iTunes Store. In August, Hassle released an extended play (EP) entitled The Hassle Sessions: Volume One, consisting of cover songs. His English version of the single "Alors on danse" by Stromae was made available through Spotify.

=== 2011–2014: Songwriting success ===
The mini-album Mariefred Sessions was the result of a collaboration between Erik Hassle and Joakim Berg and Martin Sköld from the Swedish band Kent. Mariefred Sessions was released in Sweden on 23 March 2011. Hassle moved to Los Angeles in 2013.

Hassle was a co-writer for Shakira's single "Can't Remember to Forget You" featuring Rihanna. It released worldwide in January 2014 and reached top ten charts in various countries such as Spain, France, Germany, and Switzerland. The single also debuted in the U.S. at number 15 on the Billboard Hot 100 chart. It was the first official track written by Hassle and sung by another artist.

Hassle released his next EP, entitled Somebody's Party, via TEN Music Group and RCA Records on 4 March 2014 after a two-year hiatus. The EP was a collection of 6 tracks heavily influenced by R&B. Hassle released "Talk About It," featuring Chicago based rapper Vic Mensa, as his comeback single. Other featured artists on the EP included Tinashe in the song "Innocence Lost." The EP was inspired by the hardships of being in a relationship and Erik's own personal heartbreak.

=== 2015–2016: "No Words" and collaborations ===
While visiting his home country, Sweden, Hassle began working on "No Words." In an interview with Billboard Magazine, Hassle shared that he wrote the song while experiencing a heartbreak. The single was released in April 2015 and received additional publicity when it headed off Taylor Swift's list of "Songs that would Make your Life more Awesome". "No Words" went viral, reaching the Top 10 of the Global and U.S. Spotify Viral Chart and achieving Gold certification in both Sweden and Denmark. It was described as "an uptempo, disco-tinged confection of sighing strings and funk guitar" and hailed as "a return to Hassle's unabashed melodic melancholia." In October, Erik Hassle peaked at number 14 on Billboard's Next Big Sound.

Hassle co-wrote and provided vocals for the single "Emergency" by fellow label mates and Swedish pop-duo Icona Pop. The single was officially released in May 2015, reached the number one spot in the U.S. Dance Club Songs, and was featured in FIFA 16. He toured across North America supporting Twin Shadow.

Over the years, Hassle collaborated with many artists, including Groundislava on his single "Flatline", Broderick Batts on "¯\_(ツ)_/¯", Kungs on Omi's "Midnight Serenade", Gorgon City on "FTPA", Bondax on "Love Me Blind", and Snakehips on "Cruel".

=== 2017: Innocence Lost ===
Hassle released the album "Innocence Lost" via TEN Music Group and RCA Records on 27 January 2017. The 12-track album includes the single "Missing You" produced by John Hill. The LP was executively produced by Daniel Ledinsky and features the guest vocals of Tinashe and Vic Mensa, producers Eshraque "iSHi" Mughal and Dave Sitek, with additional production from SOHN, Oskar "Sikow" Engstroem, Billboard, Gorgon City and Al Shux.

Hassle's singing has been compared to Michael Jackson, Prince, and Frank Ocean. He has been described as "a huskier-voiced Justin Timberlake singing over The Knocks' choicest beats."

== Personal life ==
Hassle's mother is a singer and his father is a studio owner. He has three brothers and two sisters.

== Discography ==
=== Albums ===
| Title | Album details | Peak chart positions | | | |
| Title | Album details | SWE | DEN | UK | US |
|---|---|---|---|---|---|
| Hassle | Released: 19 August 2009; Label: Roxy; Formats: CD, digital download | 2 | — | — | — |
| Pieces | Released: 22 February 2010; Label: Island; Formats: CD, digital download | — | 16 | 154 | 35 |
| We Dance | Released: 4 July 2012; Label: Roxy; Formats: CD, digital download | 30 | — | — | — |
| Innocence Lost | Released: 27 January 2017; Label: TEN, RCA; Formats: Digital download | — | — | — | — |
"—" denotes items which were not released in that country or failed to chart.

=== Extended plays ===
| Title | Album details | Peak chart positions | | |
| Title | Album details | SWE | DEN | UK |
|---|---|---|---|---|
| iTunes Festival: London 2009 | Released: 31 July 2009; Label: Island; Formats: Digital download | — | — | — |
| The Hassle Sessions: Volume One | Released: 15 August 2010; Label: Island; Formats: Digital download | — | — | — |
| Taken EP | Released: 4 October 2010; Label: Roxy; Formats: Digital download | — | — | — |
| Mariefred Sessions | Released: 23 March 2011; Label: Roxy; Formats: CD, digital download | 11 | — | — |
| Somebody's Party | Released: 3 March 2014; Label: TEN, RCA; Formats: Digital download | — | — | — |
"—" denotes items which were not released in that country or failed to chart.

=== Singles ===
| Year | Title | Peak chart positions | | | | | Certifications | Album |
| Year | Title | SWE | DEN | UK | US APS | US BTEA | Certifications | Album |
|---|---|---|---|---|---|---|---|---|
| 2008 | "Hurtful" | 11 | 2 | 59 | 30 | — | SWE: Gold; DEN: Gold | Hassle / Pieces |
| 2009 | "Love Me to Pieces" | — | — | — | — | — | | Hassle / Pieces |
| 2009 | "Don't Bring Flowers" | 25 | 11 | — | — | — | DEN: Gold | Hassle / Pieces |
| 2010 | "Standing Where You Left Me" | 32 | — | — | — | — | | Taken EP |
| 2010 | "Taken (Still in My Blood)" | 55 | — | — | — | — | | Taken EP |
| 2011 | "Nothing Can Change This Love" | — | — | — | — | — | | The Hassle Sessions: Volume One |
| 2011 | "Are You Leaving" | — | — | — | — | — | | Mariefred Sessions |
| 2011 | "Stay Away" | — | — | — | — | — | | Mariefred Sessions |
| 2012 | "Stay" | — | — | — | — | — | | We Dance |
| 2012 | "Back Under Water" | — | — | — | — | — | | We Dance |
| 2012 | "Grace" | — | — | — | — | — | | We Dance |
| 2013 | "Talk About It" | — | — | — | — | — | | Somebody's Party EP |
| 2014 | "Pathetic" | — | — | — | — | 38 | | Somebody's Party EP |
| 2015 | "No Words" | 83 | — | — | — | 16 | | Innocence Lost |
| 2015 | "Natural Born Lovers" | — (Note: "Natural Born Lovers" did not enter the Swedish Singles Chart, but peaked at number four on the Swedish Heatseeker chart.) | — | — | — | — | | Non-album singles |
| 2015 | "Smaller" | — (Note: "Smaller" did not enter the Swedish Singles Chart, but peaked at number 15 on the Swedish Heatseeker chart.) | — | — | — | — | | Non-album singles |
| 2016 | "If Your Man Only Knew" | — | — | — | — | — | | Innocence Lost |
| 2017 | "Missing You" | — | — | — | — | — | | Innocence Lost |
"—" denotes items which were not released in that country or failed to chart.

=== Notable guest appearances ===
| Title | Year | Other artist(s) | Album |
|---|---|---|---|
| "Alors on danse" (featuring Erik Hassle) | 2010 | Stromae | Cheese |
| "FTPA" (featuring Erik Hassle) | 2014 | Gorgon City | Sirens |
| "Emergency" (featuring Erik Hassle) | 2015 | Icona Pop | Emergency |

=== Songwriting credits ===
| Title | Year | Artist(s) | Album | Credits | Written with: |
|---|---|---|---|---|---|
| "I Think I Love You" | 2013 | Ulrik Munther | Rooftop | Co-writer | Ulrik Munther, Gustav Jonsson |
| "Pac Man" (featuring Erik Hassle) | 2013 | Elliphant | A Good Idea | Featured artist/Co-writer | Ellinor Olovsdottir, Theodore Krotkiewski, Timothy Deneve |
| "Can't Remember to Forget You" (featuring Rihanna) | 2014 | Shakira | Shakira | Co-writer | Shakira Ripoll, Thomas Hull, Jonathan Hill, Daniel Alexander, Robyn Fenty |
| "Girls" | 2014 | Beatrice Eli | Die Another Day | Co-writer | Beatrice Blennberger, Daniel Alexander, Daniel Ledinsky, Saska Becker |
| "Happy Idiot" | 2014 | TV on the Radio | Seeds | Co-writer | David Malone, David Sitek, Tunde Adebimpe, Jaleel Bunton, Daniel Ledinsky |
| "Endless" | 2014 | Zara Larsson | 1 | Co-writer | Daniel Ledinsky, Gustav Jonsson |
| "FTPA" (featuring Erik Hassle) | 2014 | Gorgon City | Sirens | Featured artist/Co-writer | Kye Gibbon, Matthew Robson-Scott, Jonathan Coffer, Daniel Ledinsky |
| "I Want You" | 2014 | Nick Jonas | Nick Jonas | Co-writer | Jacob Cruz, Nicholas Ruth |
| "Emergency" | 2015 | Icona Pop | Emergency EP | Co-writer | Caroline Hjelt, Aino Jawo, Eric Frederic, John Theodore Geiger II, Thomas Peyton, Luca Citandini, Gianfranco Bortolotti, Diego Leoni |
| "Temptation" (featuring Erik Hassle) | 2015 | Bondax | Non-album single | Featured artist/Co-writer | Adam Kaye, George Townsend, Casey Barth, James Knapp |
| "Midnight Serenade" (featuring Erik Hassle) | 2015 | OMI | Me 4 U | Featured artist/Co-writer | Omar Samuel Pasley, Daniel Ledinsky |
| "Black Wedding" | 2016 | Adiam | Black Wedding | Co-writer | Adiam Dymott, Daniel Ledinsky, David Sitek |
| "Quiet Desperation" | 2016 | Adiam | Black Wedding | Co-writer | Adiam Dymott, Daniel Ledinsky, David Sitek |
| "My Girl" | 2016 | FO&O | FO&O | Co-writer | Samuel Kvist, Daniel Ledinsky, Timothy Caifeldt |
| "Love Me Long" (featuring Major Lazer & Gyptian) | 2016 | Elliphant | Living Life Golden | Co-writer | Ellinor Olovsdottir, Andy Price, Thomas Pentz, Philip Meckseper, Windel Edwards |
| "Cruel" (featuring ZAYN) | 2016 | Snakehips | Non-album single | Co-writer | Oliver Dickinson, James David, Cass Lowe, Zayn Malik |
| "Bigger" | 2016 | Adiam | Black Wedding | Co-writer | Adiam Dymott, Daniel Ledinsky, David Sitek |
| "Follow Me" | 2016 | Adiam | Black Wedding | Co-writer | Adiam Dymott, Daniel Ledinsky, David Sitek, Katheryn Guerra |
| "Make That Money Girl" | 2017 | Zara Larsson | So Good | Co-writer | Zara Larsson, Markus Sephermanesh, Victor Mensah, Daniel Ledinsky, Ajay Bhattacharaya, Jonathan Hill |
| "With You" (featuring Wrabel) | 2017 | Kygo | Kids in Love | Co-writer | Kyrre Gorvell-Dahll, Stephen Wrabel, Drew Pearson |
| "Under" (featuring Erik Hassle) | 2017 | RKCB | RKCB-Sides EP | Featured artist/Co-writer | Casey Barth, James Knapp |
| "Unless It's with You" | 2018 | Christina Aguilera | Liberation | Co-writer | Christina Aguilera, Eric Frederic, John Theodore Geiger II, Thomas Peyton, Gamal Lewis |
| "New Love" | 2019 | Backstreet Boys | DNA | Co-writer | Jacob Troth, Elof Loelv |
| "Orange Trees" | 2019 | Marina | Love + Fear | Co-writer | Marina Diamandis, Oscar Gorres, Jakob Jerlstrom |
| "Fly To You" | 2019 | Annika Rose | Ventura Boulevard | Co-writer | Annika Rose, Daniel Ledinsky, Nicki Adamson |
| "WAR" | 2019 | Annika Rose | Ventura Boulevard | Co-writer | Annika Rose, Daniel Ledinsky, Nicki Adamson |
| "Bitterweet" | 2020 | Annika Rose | Non-album single | Co-writer | Annika Rose, Gustav Jonsson, Mike Adubato |
| "Butterflies" | 2020 | Annika Rose | Non-album single | Co-writer | Annika Rose, Tim Randolph |

=== Music videos ===
| Year | Song | Album | Director |
|---|---|---|---|
| 2010 | "Hurtful" | Pieces | Phil Griffin |
| 2010 | "Don't Bring Flowers" | Pieces | David Dawoodi |
| 2013 | "Talk About It feat. Vic Mensa" | Innocence Lost | Alexander Dahl |
| 2014 | "Pathetic" | Innocence Lost | Ray Brady |
| 2014 | "Innocence Lost" | Innocence Lost | Erik Hassle |
| 2015 | "No Words" | Innocence Lost | Ellis Bahl |
| 2015 | "Natural Born Lovers" | Non-album singles | Dano Cerny |
| 2015 | "Smaller" | Non-album singles | Joachim Johnson |

== Awards ==
- 2010 Danish GAFFA-priset – International Newcomer of the Year
- 2009 Swedish Grammis – Newcomer of the Year
- 2009 Swedish P3 Guld – Newcomer of the Year
