= Die Another Day (disambiguation) =

Die Another Day is a 2002 film and the 20th Eon Productions James Bond film.

Die Another Day may also refer to:

- Die Another Day (soundtrack), soundtrack of the film
- "Die Another Day" (song), the theme from the film interpreted by Madonna
- Die Another Day (Beatrice Eli album), 2014 album by Beatrice Eli
- "Die Another Day" (2013), a song by Korn on some editions of The Paradigm Shift
- "Die Another Day" (2022), a song by Dance Gavin Dance on Jackpot Juicer

== See also ==
- "Die Yet Another Night" (2016), another song by Korn from The Serenity of Suffering
