= Omar Rudberg =

Swedish singer (born 1998)

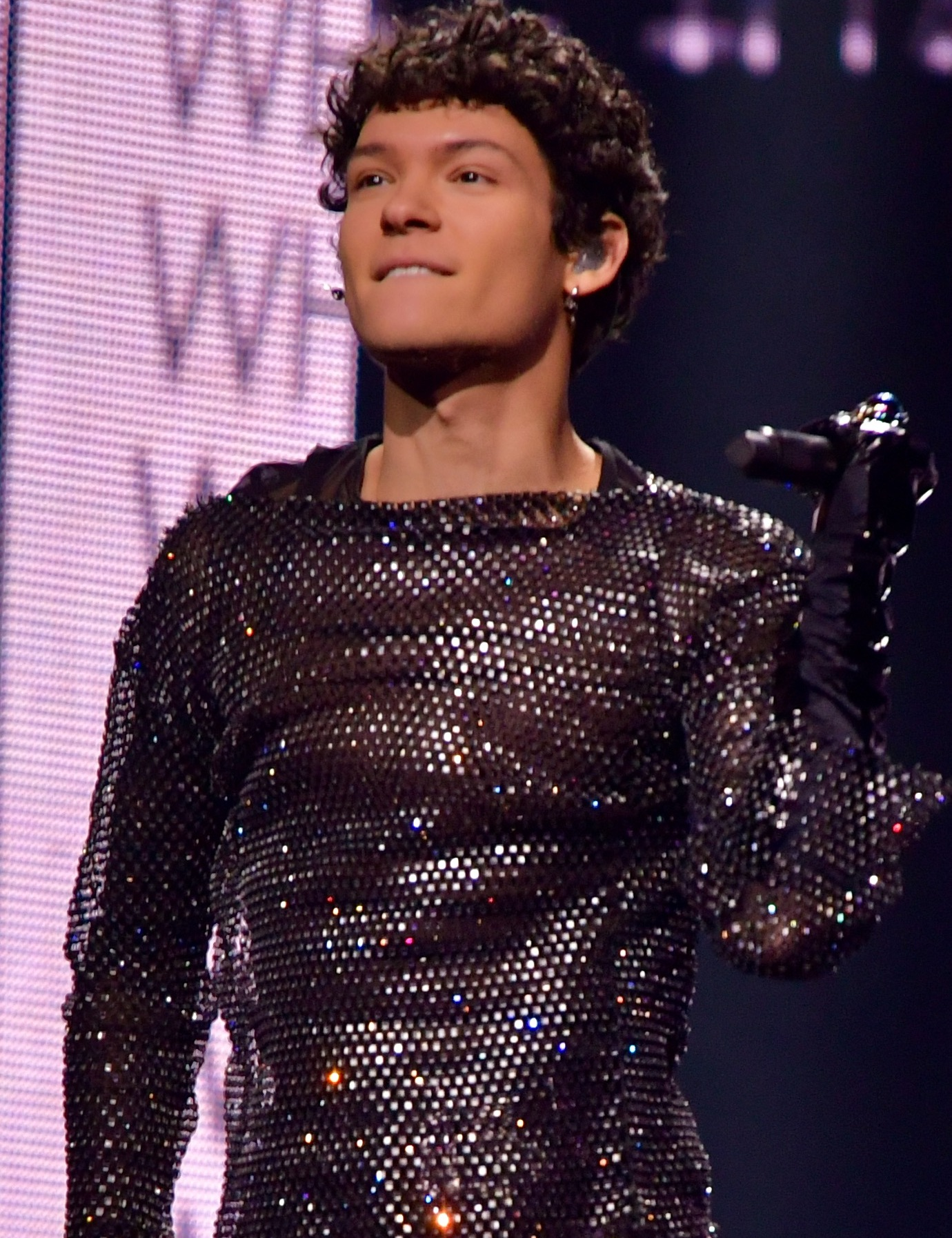
- Rudberg in 2022

Background information
- Born: Omar Josué González; 12 November 1998 (age 27); Anaco, Venezuela
- Origin: Åsa, Sweden
- Genres: Pop; soul; Latin pop; Swedish pop; reggaeton
- Occupations: Singer; songwriter; actor
- Years active: 2013–present
- Label: TEN
- Formerly of: FO&O
- Website: www.omarrudberg.com

Omar Josué Rudberg (né González; born 12 November 1998) is a Venezuelan-Swedish singer and actor. Before launching his solo career in 2018, he gained recognition and began his professional music career in 2013 as a member of the Swedish boy band FO&O. As an actor, he is known for his starring role as Simon Eriksson in the Netflix teen drama series Young Royals (2021–2024).

== Early life ==
Rudberg was born Omar Josué González on 12 November 1998 in Anaco, Venezuela. When he was six years old, he moved to Sweden with his mother, Wilnur, who married his Swedish stepfather, Thomas Rudberg, from whom he took his surname.

In June 2023, on the Swedish radio program Sommar i P1, Rudberg discussed his early childhood in Venezuela, the difficulties he faced as an immigrant upon moving to Sweden, his struggles with identity and belonging, and the challenges he faced when bullied with racist and homophobic remarks, as well as for his love of performing. Rudberg also opened up about his connection to music, his experiences in the entertainment industry as a teenager, his foray into acting, and the importance of staying true to oneself amidst fame. Rudberg's Sommarprat received positive reviews for his insights and intimate storytelling.

In 2010, Rudberg participated in the fourth season of the talent show Talang, the Swedish version of Got Talent.

== Career ==
=== 2013–2017: FO&O ===
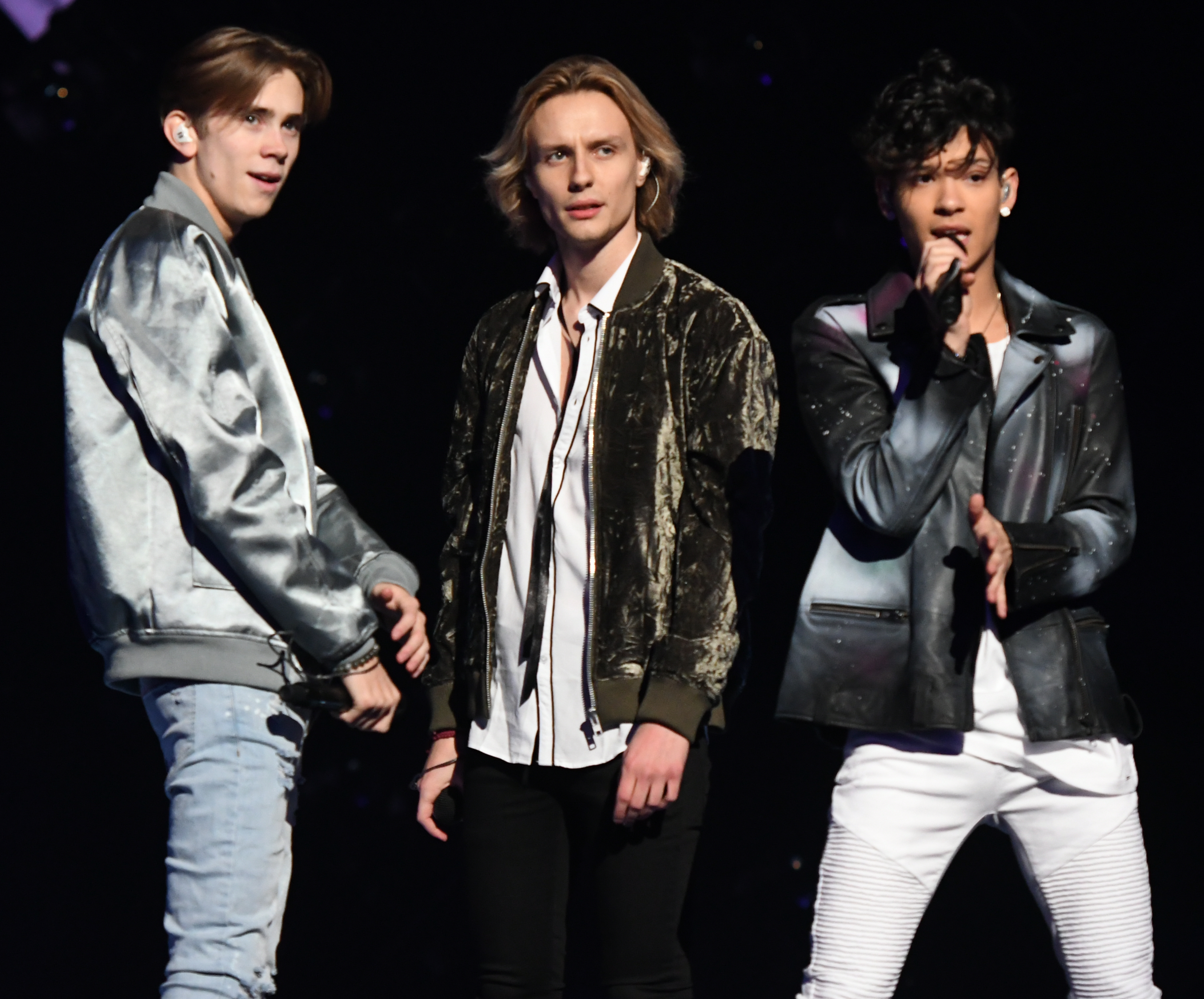
Rudberg (right) at Melodifestivalen 2017 with fellow FO&O members Felix Sandman and Oscar Enestad

Rudberg began his professional music career in 2013 as a member of the Swedish boy band FO&O. FO&O performed together for four years. In that time, they won eight different music awards and were nominated for 12. They were awarded two Platinum and one Gold certifications, and got over 80 million streams on Spotify. FO&O participated in Melodifestivalen 2017, sold out several shows, and opened for Justin Bieber and One Direction. In 2017, the band announced that its members were going to focus on their separate solo projects.

=== 2018–2020: Start of solo career ===
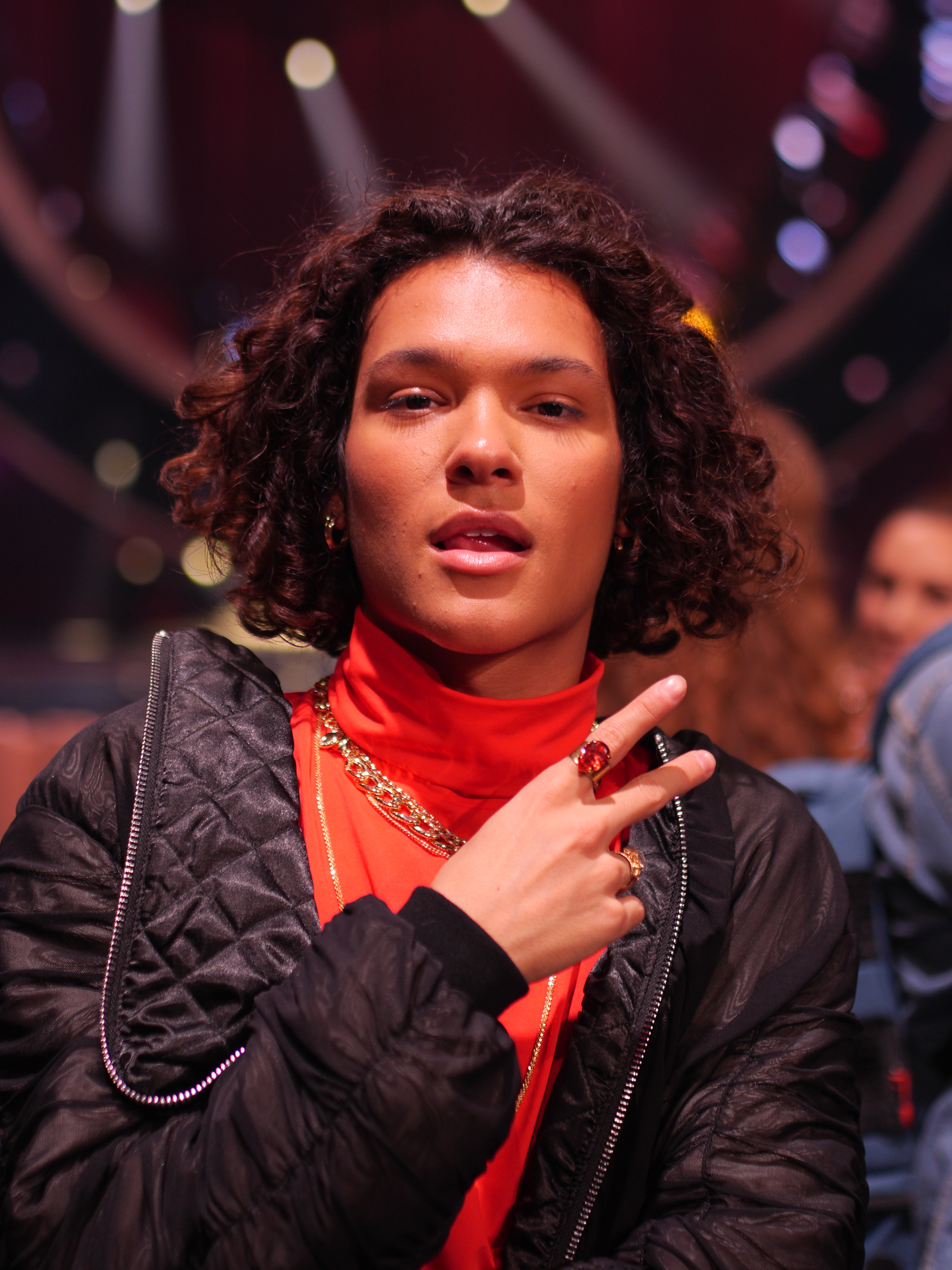
Rudberg at Melodifestivalen 2019

Rudberg started his solo music career in 2018 with the single "Que Pasa" featuring Lamix, followed by "La Mesa" featuring Elias Hurtig in August of the same year. In February 2019, he released the single "Om om och om igen" after participating with the song in Melodifestivalen 2019. The song became his first solo top 20 hit in Sweden on Sverigetopplistan. He also released the single "På min telephone toda la noche".

In 2020, he released the single "Dum," and "Dum – Playback Version" followed by the songs "Jag e nån annan" and "LÄPPAR." In November 2020, it was announced that Rudberg had been cast in the Netflix queer coming-of-age series Young Royals. It was later revealed that Rudberg found out he got the role of Simon Eriksson on 20 August 2020. His role as Simon was his acting debut. Rudberg has mentioned that he "knew people were going to love this series" as soon as he read the script.

=== 2021–2023: Young Royals and international recognition ===
==== 2021 ====
In July 2021, the first season of Young Royals debuted on Netflix. Rudberg quickly gained international recognition from his role in the series. Alongside the series, he released the EP "Omar Covers," featuring the covers of the songs his character Simon sings in the show. In 2021, Rudberg also released the single "Alla ba ouff" and its Spanish version "Yo dije ouff." In September 2021, it was announced that Young Royals had been renewed for a second season. In November 2021, he was featured on the cover of the Spanish magazine Xmag.

==== 2022 ====
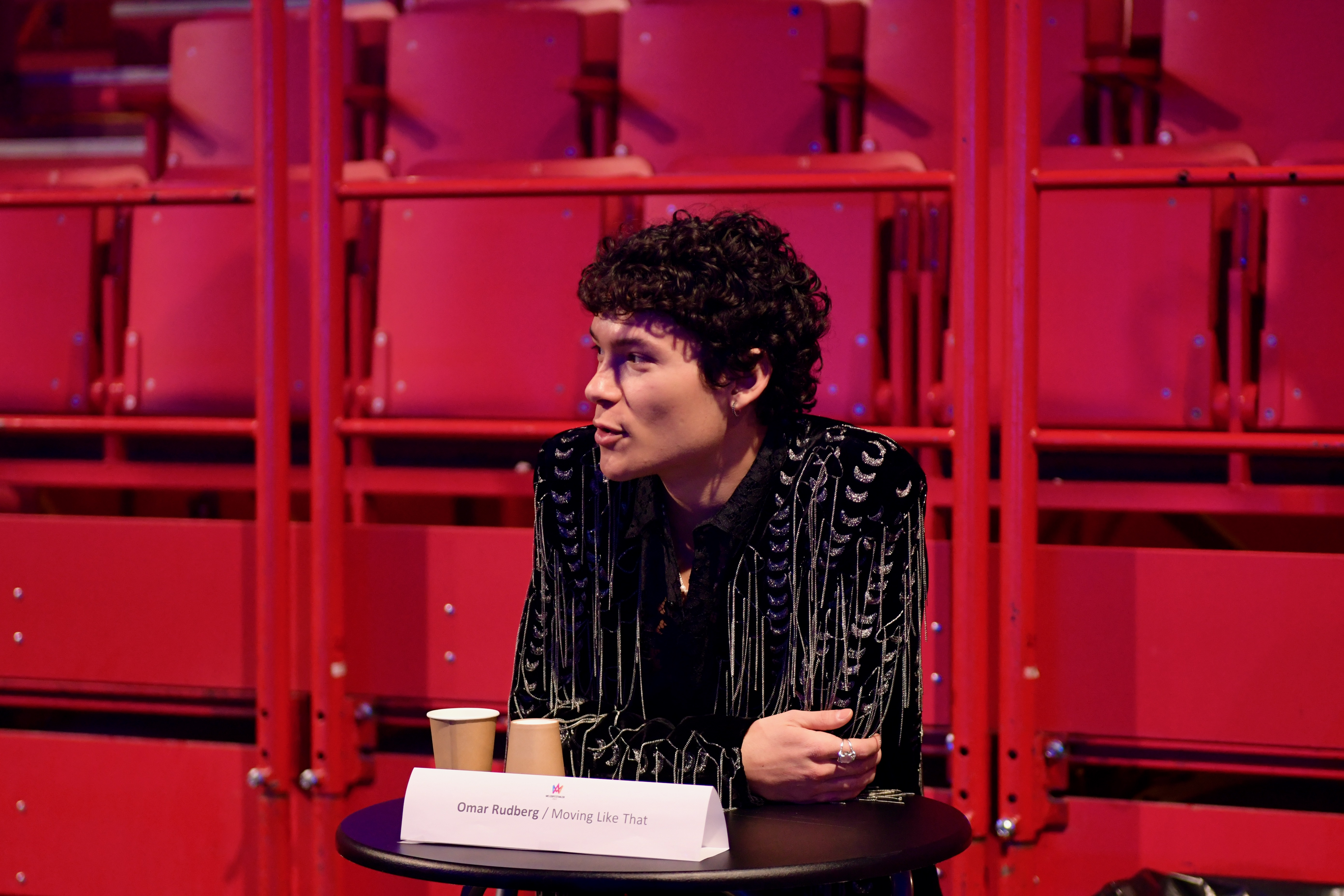
Rudberg at Melodifestivalen 2022

In April, Rudberg collaborated with Benjamin Ingrosso and released the single "La Incondicional (From Benjamin's)". In May 2022, Rudberg released his first solo album, OMR, which featured the single he released at the beginning of the same year "Mi casa su casa," and the song "Moving Like That", with which he participated in Melodifestivalen 2022, as well as "La Incondicional." In June 2022, he released the single "Nakna" with Victoria Nadine, followed by "Todo de ti (All That She Wants)" in July. In November 2022, the second season of Young Royals debuted on Netflix. Alongside the season, he released the single "Simon's Song", an original song written for the show and sung by Rudberg in the show.

In December 2022, Rudberg appeared on The Tonight Show Starring Jimmy Fallon with Young Royals costar Edvin Ryding. Later, it was announced that Young Royals had been renewed for a third and final season with Rudberg again reprising his role as Simon Eriksson. It was also announced that Rudberg had been cast as Dante in his first feature film, Karusell, which was released in October 2023.

==== 2023 ====
In January 2023, he released the single "Call Me by Your Name" featuring Claudia Neuser. In March 2023, Rudberg released the single "I'm So Excited", which featured the live version of this song that Rudberg performed in February at the 2023 QX Gay Gala. Additionally in March, Rudberg released the EP Mi Casa Su Casa (Remixes).

Rudberg released the single "She Fell in Love In the Summer" in April 2023. In April, Rudberg was also named Best Dressed Man of the Year at Elle-galan, the annual gala for Swedish Elle. In June 2023, Rudberg released the acoustic version of "She Fell In Love In The Summer". He was also featured by FDVM in their single "All In My Head". Also in June, Rudberg released the single "Happier".

In July 2023, Rudberg released the single "She Fell In Love In The Summer (Additional Versions)." In September 2023, Rudberg released "Happier (Remixes)." In October 2023, Rudberg released "Coast Side (Carousel Remix), which was used in Karusell's end credits. The film Karusell was released for theaters first in Sweden and then in other countries. Additionally, in October, Rudberg released the single "Off My Mind (featuring Jubël)."

In November 2023, Rudberg updated his social media profiles to indicate that he was being represented by Jubel Agency, a Sweden-based agency for independent artists, and announced an upcoming live solo concert. In December 2023, Rudberg appeared on three episodes of the Swedish reality television show Så mycket bättre where he performed three new songs inspired by other guests' songs including "Om du inte fanns (Don't Wait)," "Höj ett glas (Fanfar)," and "Min första (I Will Always Be Your Soldier)." These songs were released as the EP Så mycket bättre 2023 – Tolkningarna. Also in 2023, Café magazine named Rudberg Sweden's best-dressed man.

=== 2024 ===
Alongside the release of the EP Så mycket bättre 2023 – Tolkningarna, Rudberg released music videos in January 2024 that corresponded to the three songs as well as one full music video, all which featured a storyline with a sapphic couple.

On 17 February 2024, Rudberg performed his first solo live concert in Stockholm, Sweden, in the Cirkus Arena to a sold-out venue of an estimated 1600-member audience from over 40 countries. The 90-minute concert included songs from his discography and featured a new song called "Red Light". Jubël and Mapei made appearances in his concert.

In March 2024, Rudberg announced via his social media platforms that he had been invited to the 96th Academy Awards, and he appeared on the red carpet. Also in March, season 3 of Young Royals debuted on Netflix along with a documentary of the show's creation called Young Royals Forever. Rudberg shared in interviews that he would soon be signing with a US record label as an additional label alongside TEN and updated his social media platforms to indicate that he was being represented by Elektra Records.

In early May 2024, Queerty made Rudberg one of their Pride50 honorees. In mid-May, Rudberg released the single "Red Light". In an interview with Musikindustrin, TEN Music Group shared that they had signed a direct license for Rudberg with Elektra Entertainment that allows Rudberg's music to be published worldwide outside of the Nordic countries. "Red Light" was the first of Rudberg's music to be released under this license agreement and became his first official international release and first release of 2024. His Elektra label debut was covered by Billboard magazine. In May, while performing on Furuvik Live, Rudberg sang two new songs, "Talk" and "Bye Bye."

Between May 2024 and June 2024, when Rudberg developed an official website, his music started to be released under Atlantic Records with distribution to Nordic countries by ADA Nordic; some music was provided to YouTube by Elektra (NEK).

In early June 2024, Rudberg performed a solo concert love in Gröna Lund Amusement Park in Stockholm, Sweden. In mid-June, Rudberg performed at the School's Out event in Söderhamn, Sweden. In June, Rudberg partnered with Cover Nation for Pride Month to sing a cover of Madonna's song "Sorry," which he performed atop the Nordiska Kompaniet rooftop in Stockholm. He also participated in PROUD SOUND, a days-long writing camp in the UK for queer artists. On 25 June, Rudberg announced via his social media platforms that he would be performing his first European–US tour as a solo artist starting in October 2024, with shows planned in London, France, the Netherlands, Germany, New York City, and Los Angeles. On 28 June, Rudberg released two new singles, "Talk" and "Bye Bye", under the Elektra Records label and received a mention in Rolling Stone and Teen Vogue. He also released a music video for "Talk," featuring himself and Swedish actor and dancer Ruben Karsberg in a queer, flirty storyline set in Stockholm that showcased Rudberg and Karsberg performing alongside four other male dancers.

In early July 2024, Rudberg participated in Allsång på Skansen in Stockholm where he sang "Red Light" and a cover ABBA's "Mamma Mia". In July, Rockbjörnen 2024 made Rudberg an official nominee after fans wrote his name and music into the festival's online nomination form. He was nominated as Årets Manliga Artist, Årets Svenska Låt (for his song "Red Light"), and Årets Fans, as well as the festival's newly instituted Grönan Live Act of the Year.

In August 2024, Rudberg was featured in Variety and WWD, among other media sources, for being invited to attend Variety's Power of Young Hollywood event in Los Angeles, California. He attended the event, which celebrated young actors who have had an impact in movies and shows over the last year, and appeared on the event's red carpet. On 24 August, Rudberg performed during the Trädgården Festival in Kristianstad, Sweden. On 29 August, Rudberg performed at Kulturkalaset in Gothenburg, Sweden. Audience members came from around the world to see him perform, including fans from Australia, the Netherlands, Germany, Denmark, and the US.

On 1 September 2024, Rudberg performed in his first international festival in the Heide Park Festival in Soltau, Germany. On 5 September, Rudberg attended the Kristallen Gala in Stockholm, Sweden, alongside Young Royals cast member Frida Argento and was mentioned in Damernas Värld magazine as being one of the best-dressed attendees. On 18 September 2024, Rudberg attended the Rockbjörnen 2024 event in which he was the most nominated artist. He won two of the four awards he was nominated for Grönan Live Act of the Year and Årets Svenska Låt ('Swedish Song of the Year') for "Red Light". On 20 September 2024, Rudberg released a single titled "Sabotage." Rudberg's Swedish label, TEN, also announced that Rudberg would release an EP entitled Every Night Fantasy on 18 October 2024 that would include the already-released singles "Red Light," "Talk," and "Bye Bye." Soon after, Rudberg shared a pre-save link for the EP on his social media platforms.

On 11 October, Rudberg attended the You+ Music Conference in Stockholm, Sweden, where he was a panelist for the You+ Learn session "Hur hittar man fanns?" Rudberg released the EP Every Night Fantasy on 18 October 2024. This was the fourth EP of Rudberg's solo career and his debut EP under Atlantic Records. On 21 October 2024, Rudberg kickstarted his first European–US tour (titled Omar Rudberg's Fall Tour 2024) as a solo artist with the first stop on the tour in London, England. His sold-out performance took place at the Heaven nightclub before a packed venue of 1200 fans from around the world and featured a new set list that included seven songs from his newly released EP Every Night Fantasy. On 23 October, Rudberg performed the second show of his sold-out Fall Tour 2024 in Paris, France, at Badaboum to an audience of more than 550. On 24 October, Rudberg performed the third show of his Fall Tour 2024 in Amsterdam, Netherlands, in Melkweg. Rudberg concluded the European leg of his Fall Tour 2024 on 25 October at Club Bahnhof Ehrenfeld (Cbe) in Cologne, Germany. On 28 October, Rudberg performed his first concert on a US stage as a solo artist and kicked off the American leg of his Fall Tour 2024 to a sold-out show in the Music Hall of Williamsburg in Brooklyn, New York City. On 30 October, LE MILE magazine published an interview and fashion shoot with Rudberg in its Fall/Winter 2024 edition. Rudberg commenced a short, 6 show promotional tour- his first headline international tour- in fall of 2024. Rudberg completed his Fall Tour 2024 on 4 November, performing the final show of the American leg of the tour in the El Rey Theatre in Los Angeles, California.

=== 2025-present ===
On 4 November 2024, Rudberg announced February 2025 dates for his Every Night Fantasy Tour, which listed 18 concerts in cities across 11 different European countries including the UK, the Netherlands, Belgium, France, Spain, Italy, Germany, Poland, Sweden, Norway, and Denmark. On the 17th of September 2025, he was the most awarded artist at Swedish award show Rockbjornen. Rudberg won Swedish song of the year, Male artist of the year, Fans of the year, and International song of the year. On the 4th of September 2025, Omar Rudberg announced in an Instagram post that he would open for popular Swedish singer Zara Larsson on her Midnight Sun Europe Tour. He toured with her from October 28th to November 28th 2025, performing in 17 cities across Europe.

In December 2025, he opened the 2025 Nobel Peace Prize Exhibition with the song "Venezuela".

== OMR Beauty ==
In November 2023, Rudberg launched his own beauty product company called OMR Beauty. It debuted with one product, a signature unisex scent called Intro. In February 2024, before Rudberg's first solo live concert, it was announced that Rudberg would be at Lyko's flagship store in central Stockholm, and people could purchase Intro and meet him. Hundreds of attendees showed up for the event. Soon after, Lyko added Intro to their official website as a fragrance that they sell off the shelf.

In May 2024, Rudberg announced that he had collaborated with his Young Royals co-star Edvin Ryding to create a second unisex scent called Duo, which would be available for purchase on the OMR Beauty website for a limited time. In June 2024, Rudberg and Ryding co-launched Duo through a multi-tiered social media campaign via OMR Beauty. The scent was made available for purchase and delivery to a limited number of countries.

In July 2024, Rudberg and OMR Beauty announced the launch of the company's third product, a cap with the company name embroidered on it.

In October 2024, Rudberg launched Brunch, the third unisex scent made by his company OMR Beauty, and the company's fourth product. The perfume oil was made available in limited quantities on the company's website. On 30 October 2024, OMR Beauty announced the upcoming launch of two more perfume oils, Lunch and Dinner, to round out a collection called Occasions, which included Brunch. On 7 November 2024, OMR Beauty released all three perfume oils for ordering on their website to select countries around the world. The products were launched with a short campaign ad that featured Rudberg, Hugo Hultgren, and Swedish model Megan Kennedy Grundén.

== Personal life ==
In June 2019, speaking to Swedish LGBTQ+ magazine QX, Rudberg said: "I don't have a 'label'. As a person, I'm very open-minded. I dare not put a title. It feels so damn scary. Sometimes I hang out with guys, sometimes with girls. It varies. I don't know if it's because of my age, that I'm still young. I feel lost, not in a bad way, but just lost in life." In August 2021, he once again expressed his wish to not label his sexuality, saying that he falls in love with the person regardless of the person's gender. In a March 2024 farewell post on Instagram following the conclusion of Young Royals, Rudberg said: "When I was a little kid I knew that something was different about me. I had feelings I always tried to push away from a very young age. I had feelings for a boy I always ignored because I was afraid. I felt like I was the only one in the whole world that felt this way. I was drowning myself in denial. Telling myself that it'll pass and that one day I'll be like everyone else. I will be 'normal'. [...] Let's keep fighting for our rights to love. Our rights to exist. And let's keep being loud about it. If little Omar only knew."

== Discography ==
=== Studio albums ===
Title	Details
OMR	Released: 27 May 2022; Label: TEN; Formats: Digital download, streaming

=== Extended plays ===
Title	Details
Omar Covers	Released: 9 July 2021; Label: TEN; Formats: Digital download, streaming
Så mycket bättre 2023 – Tolkningarna	Released: 11 December 2023; Label: TEN; Formats: Digital download, streaming
Every Night Fantasy	Released: 18 October 2024; Label: TEN; Formats: Digital download, streaming

=== Singles ===
Title	Year	Peak chart positions		Certifications	Album
Title	Year	SWE	NOR	Certifications	Album
"Que pasa" (featuring Lamix)	2018	—	—		Non-album singles
"La mesa" (featuring Elias Hurtig)	2018	—	—		Non-album singles
"Om om och om igen"	2019	11	—	GLF: Gold	Non-album singles
"På min telephone toda la noche"	2019	—	—		Non-album singles
"Dum" "Dum – Singback version"	2020	59	—	GLF: Gold	Non-album singles
"Jag e nån annan"	2020	—	—		Non-album singles
"LÄPPAR"	2020	—	—		Non-album singles
"Alla ba ouff"	2021	—	—		Non-album singles
"It Takes a Fool to Remain Sane""Symphony" "Remember"	2021	—	—		Omar Covers
"Yo dije ouff"	2021	—	—		Non-album single
"Mi casa su casa"	2022	—	—		OMR
"Moving Like That"	2022	57	—		OMR
"La Incondicional (From Benjamin's)"	2022				Non-album singles
"Todo de ti (All That She Wants)"	2022	—	—		Non-album singles
"Nakna" (with Victoria Nadine)	2022	—	33		Non-album singles
"Simon's Song"	2022	43	—		Non-album singles
"Call Me by Your Name" (featuring Claudia Neuser)	2022	—	—		Non-album singles
I'm So Excited (Club Version)	2022				Non-album singles
I'm So Excited	2022				Non-album singles
"She Fell in Love in the Summer"	2023	—	—		Non-album singles
"All In My Head" (FDVM featuring Omar Rudberg)	2023	—	—		Non-album singles
"Happier"	2023	—	—		Non-album singles
"Happier (Remixes)"	2023				Non-album singles
"Coast Side (Carousel Remix)"	2023				Non-album singles
"Off My Mind" (featuring Jubël)	2023	—	—		Non-album singles
"Red Light"	2024				Non-album singles
"Talk/Bye Bye"	2024				Non-album singles
"Sabotage"	2024				Non-album singles
"Dying"	2025				TBA
"Malandro"	2025				TBA
"Bebezinho" (with Bianca Costa & Erick Brian)	2025				Gringa
“Gabriela - Spotify Singles”					Non-album singles
"Siren" (with Felix Jaehn)	2026	—	—		
“A World Like This”	2026	—	—		TBA
"Careless"	2026	—	—		TBA

== Videography ==
Title	Year	Other performers	Director	Producer	Choreography	Other notes	Ref
"Que Pasa"	2018	Lamix	Robin Kadir				
"La Mesa"	2018	Elias Hurtig Dancer: Lovisa Bengtsson Dancer: Cynthia Cavieres Toledo	Robin Kadir	Mauro Maahez			
"Om Om Och Om Igen"	2019	None		Johan Lindbrandt Robin Stjernberg			
"på min telephone toda la noche"	2019	Dancer: Emina Iman		Rob Milo			
"Jag e nån annan"	2020	None		Gustav Blomberg			
"Alla Ba OUFF"	2021	Dancer: Erika Bitanji Extras: Felicia Truedsson; Hugo Hultgren; Julia Wieck; Amalia Afonso		Creative Producer: Nadine Clayton	Amir Ashoor		
"Ye Dije OUFF"	2021	Dancer: Erika Bitanji Extras: Felicia Truedsson; Hugo Hultgren; Julia Wieck; Amalia Afonso		Creative Producer: Nadine Clayton	Amir Ashoor		
"Mi Casa Su Casa"	2022	Dancer: Amir Ashoor Dancer: Tristan Pereda Gomez	Florian Dezfoulian	Nadine Clayton Florian Dezfoulianr Ketter Raudmets	Amir Ashoor		
"Moving Like That"	2022	Dancer: Amir Ashoor Dancer: Tristan Pereda Gomez	Florian Dezfoulian	Nadine Clayton Florian Dezfoulianr Ketter Raudmets Aron Wyme	Choreographer: Keisha von Arnold Assistant Choreographer: Amir Ashoor		
"Todo De Ti (All That She Wants)"	2022	Wife: Nayeli Meza Poolboy: Zed Millian Garden boy: Nurbo Bozan Makeup lady: Wilnur Rudberg	Johan Von Reybekiel	Florian Dezfoulian Ketter Raudmets		Rudberg's mother, Wilnur, is the make-up lady.	
"She Fell in Love in the Summer"	2023	None	Faramarz Gosheh	Nils Nygårdh Per Welén			
"Så Mycket Bättre 2023 – Tolkningarna"	2024	Girl 1: Wilma Dylan Girl 2: Gabi Goldman	Elliot Engberg	Carmelo Agut-Eismann		Video includes excerpts from the three songs from the EP Så Mycket Bättre 2023 – Tolkningarna and features the storyline of a sapphic couple.	
"Red Light"	2024	None	Adam Falk	Matilda Fleberg		Video is Rudberg's first visualizer.	
"Talk"	2024	Dancers: Daniel Gürow Lamin Holmén Mateo Córdova Pomo Timothy Waliggo Kakeeto Flirt: Ruben Karsberg	Jean-Luc Mwepu	Fanny Cygnaeus	Adnan Sahuric	Video features Rudberg and Karsberg in a queer, flirty storyline.	
"Girlfriend"	2024	None	Adam Falk	Dama Studios	Adnan Sahuric		

== Tours ==
- Fall Tour (2024)

Date (2024)	City	Country	Venue
October 21	London	England	Heaven
October 23	Paris	France	Badaboum
October 24	Amsterdam	The Netherlands	Melkweg
October 25	Cologne	Germany	CBE
October 28	Brooklyn	United States	Music Hall of Williamsburg
November 4	Los Angeles	United States	El Rey Theater

- Every Night Fantasy Tour (2025)

Date (2025)	City	Country	Venue
February 2	Glasgow	Scotland	SWG3 Galvanizers
February 3	Manchester	England	O_{2} Ritz
February 5	London	England	O_{2} Sheperds Bush Empire
February 6	Birmingham	England	O_{2} Academy
February 8	Bristol	England	SWX
February 10	Amsterdam	The Netherlands	Melkweg
February 12	Antwerp	Belgium	Trix
February 13	Paris	France	Le Bataclan
February 15	Madrid	Spain	Chango
February 16	Barcelona	Spain	Razzmatazz 2
February 18	Milan	Italy	Alcatraz
February 19	Munich	Germany	Tonhalle
February 21	Warsaw	Poland	Stodola
February 23	Hamburg	Germany	Docks
February 24	Cologne	Germany	Live Music Hall
February 26	Oslo	Norway	Sentrum Scene
February 27	Stockholm	Sweden	Fryshuset
February 28	Copenhagen	Denmark	Dr. Studie 2
March 2	Berlin	Germany	Huxley’s

== Filmography ==
=== Film ===
Year	Title	Role	Notes	Ref.
2023	Karusell	Dante	Feature film	

=== Television ===
Year	Title	Role	Notes	Ref.
2021–2024	Young Royals	Simon Eriksson	Main role Also voice in English dub	
2023	Drag Race Sverige	Guest judge	Episode: "Snatch Game – Sverige Season 1"	
2023	Så mycket bättre	Guest	Season 14	

== Awards and nominations ==
Award	Year	Category	Nominated work	Result	Ref.
Stockholm International Film Festival	2021	Rising Star	Young Royals	Nominated	
Gaygalan Awards	2022	Best Duo (shared with Edvin Ryding)	Young Royals	Won	
Riagalan	2022	Profile of the Year	Young Royals	Nominated	
Kristallen	2022	Best Supporting Role	Young Royals	Nominated	
Series Em Cena Awards	2022	Best Actor in a Series	Young Royals	Won	
Series Em Cena Awards	2023	Latin Artist of the Year	Music	Won	
BreakToDo Awards	2023	International Actor (Ator Internacional)	Young Royals	Nominated	
Queerties	2023	Breakout Musical Artist	Music	Won	
Series Em Cena Awards – SEC Awards	2024	International Actor (Ator Internacional)	Young Royals	Nominated	
Rockbjörnen 2024	2024	Årets Manliga Artist (Male Artist of the Year)	Music	Nominated	
Rockbjörnen 2024	2024	Årets Fans (Fans of the Year)	Music	Nominated	
Rockbjörnen 2024	2024	Årets Svenska Låt ("Red Light – Swedish Song of the Year)	Music	Won	
Rockbjörnen 2024	2024	Grönan Live Act of the Year	Music	Won	
BreakToDo Awards	2024	International Crush	Himself	Nominated	
Rockbjörnen 2025	2025	Årets Manliga Artist (Male Artist of the Year)	Music	Won	
Rockbjörnen 2025	2025	Årets Fans (Fans of the Year)	Music	Won	
Rockbjörnen 2025	2025	Årets Svenska Låt ("I'm not a boy" – Swedish Song of the Year)	Music	Won	
