= Mariefred Sessions =

EP by Erik Hassle
- Released: 23 March 2011
- Recorded: Sweden (Ateljén, Mariefred and Park Studio, Stockholm)
- Genre: Pop rock
- Length: 27:06
- Label: Roxy
- Producer: Martin Sköld, Joakim Berg, Erik Hassle

Erik Hassle chronology
Pieces (2010)	Mariefred Sessions (2011)	We Dance (2012)

Singles from Mariefred Sessions
- 1. "Are You Leaving" Released: 16 February 2011; 2. "Stay Away" Released: 6 July 2011

Mariefred Sessions is the third extended play by Swedish singer-songwriter Erik Hassle, which was released in Sweden on 23 March 2011. The EP resulted from a collaboration between Hassle and two members of Swedish rock band Kent, Joakim Berg and Martin Sköld. Mariefred Sessions was primarily recorded in Martin Sköld's studio in Mariefred, Sweden. Two singles were released from the EP; "Are You Leaving" was released on 16 February 2011, and "Stay Away" was released on 6 July 2011.

== Writing and production ==
The collaboration arose due to Kent lead singer Jocke Berg's desire to continue writing after Kent's summer tour of 2010. Hassle was contacted for a preliminary studio session, after which Kent's bass guitarist, Martin Sköld, also became involved in the project. The EP was written, recorded and produced between autumn 2010 and spring 2011.

== Track listing ==
All tracks are written by Joakim Berg, Martin Sköld, Erik Hassle.

No.	Title	Length
1.	"Are You Leaving"	4:40
2.	"Sometimes When It Rains"	4:07
3.	"I Am Not An Island"	4:23
4.	"Stay Away"	3:45
5.	"Stains"	5:33
6.	"Arrows"	4:44
Total length:		27:06

== Charts ==
Chart (2011)	Peak positions
Swedish Albums (Sverigetopplistan)	11
