= Summer Love (The Fooo Conspiracy song) =

Single by The Fooo Conspiracy

from the album FO&O
- Released: 29 April 2016
- Recorded: 2015
- Genre: Pop
- Length: 2:38
- Label: TEN Music Group, Artist House Stockholm
- Songwriter(s): Fredrik Danielson; Sara Hjellström; Nirob Islam; Omar Rudberg; Andrew Taggart
- Producer(s): Shy Nodi; Shy Martin; Taggart; Danielson

The Fooo Conspiracy singles chronology
"My Girl" (2016)	"Summer Love" (2016)	"Who Doesn't Love Love" (2016)

"Summer Love" is a song by Swedish pop boyband The Fooo Conspiracy. The song was released as a digital download in Sweden on 29 April 2016 through TEN Music Group. The song peaked at number 54 on the Swedish Singles Chart.

== Music video ==
A video to accompany the release of "Summer Love" was first released onto YouTube on 29 April 2016 at a total length of two minutes and thirty-seven seconds.

== Track listing ==
Digital download
No.	Title	Length
1.	"Summer Love"	2:38
2.	"My Girl" (Spanglish Version)	3:08

== Chart performance ==
=== Weekly charts ===
Chart (2016)	Peak position
Sweden (Sverigetopplistan)	54

== Release history ==
Region	Date	Format	Label
Sweden	29 April 2016	Digital download	TEN Music Group, Artist House Stockholm
