= Coordinates (EP) =

EP by The Fooo Conspiracy
- Released: 7 January 2015
- Recorded: 2014
- Genre: Pop
- Label: Artist House Stockholm

The Fooo Conspiracy chronology
Serenade (2014)	Coordinates (2015)	FO&O (2017)

Singles from Coordinates
- 1. "Wild Hearts" Released: 19 January 2015

Coordinates is the fourth extended play by Swedish pop boy band The Fooo Conspiracy. It was released in Sweden through The Artist House Stockholm on 7 January 2015. The album peaked at number 33 on the Swedish Albums Chart.

== Singles ==
"Wild Hearts" was released as the lead single from the album on 19 January 2015.

== Track listing ==
No.	Title	Length
1.	"Roller Coaster"	3:39
2.	"Wild Hearts"	2:49
3.	"My Beyoncé"	2:52
4.	"Ballin"	2:58
5.	"Doo-Wop"	3:22
6.	"Thirsty"	2:40
7.	"My Beyoncé" (US Version)	2:37

== Charts ==
=== Weekly charts ===
Chart (2014/15)	Peak position
Swedish Albums (Sverigetopplistan)	33

== Release history ==
Region	Date	Format	Label
Sweden	7 January 2015	Digital download	Artist House Stockholm
