= Carousel (2023 film) =

2023 film by Simon Sandquist

- Poster
- Directed by: Simon Sandquist
- Starring: Omar Rudberg; Wilma Lidén; Amanda Lindh; Embla Ingelman-Sundberg; Emil Algpeus; Ludvig Deltin
- Release date: 2023
- Running time: 94 minutes
- Country: Sweden
- Language: Swedish
- Budget: 23 million (SEK)

Carousel (Swedish: Karusell) is a Swedish horror film, released to cinemas on 20 October 2023. It is distributed by Nordisk Film.

== Plot ==
Fiona, who works at the Liseberg amusement park in Gothenburg is forced to host her former friends during an ”Halloween at Liseberg” sneak peek exclusive night. The friends will spend an entire night there, what initially is a fun night of rides and cotton candy soon turns into a night of horror, as the friends realizes that they are not alone inside the park.
