= Hassle (album) =

Studio album by Erik Hassle
- Released: 19 August 2009
- Genre: Pop
- Length: 44:11
- Label: Ten, Roxy

Erik Hassle chronology
Hassle (2009)	Pieces (2010)

Hassle is the debut studio album by Swedish pop singer Erik Hassle. The album was released on 19 August 2009 in Sweden, and features the top 30 singles "Hurtful" and "Don't Bring Flowers". The album peaked at number two on the Swedish Albums Chart.

== Track listing ==
No.	Title	Writer(s)	Length
1.	"Bump in the Road"	Grizzly, Mack, Erik Hassle	4:00
2.	"Hurtful"	Grizzly, Mack, Tommy Tysper, Hassle	3:03
3.	"Don't Bring Flowers"	Grizzly, Mack, Tysper, Hassle	3:15
4.	"Isn't It Obvious"	Fredrik Berger, Hassle	3:26
5.	"The Thanks I Get"	Grizzly, Hassle, Tysper, Mack	4:21
6.	"Wanna Be Loved"	Grizzly, Mack, Tysper, Hassle	3:59
7.	"First Time"	Grizzly, Mack, Tysper, Hassle	3:05
8.	"Love Me to Pieces"	Hassle, Tysper, Max Martin, Mack	3:09
9.	"Bitter End"	Hassle, Tysper	3:53
10.	"All That I Wanted Was You"	Grizzly, Mack, Tysper, Hassle	3:14
11.	"Back to Bed"	Berger, Grizzly, Hassle	4:02
12.	"Make It in Time"		4:00

== Charts ==
Chart (2009)	Peak position
Swedish Albums (Sverigetopplistan)	2
