= Gerilja =

Norwegian alt rock band

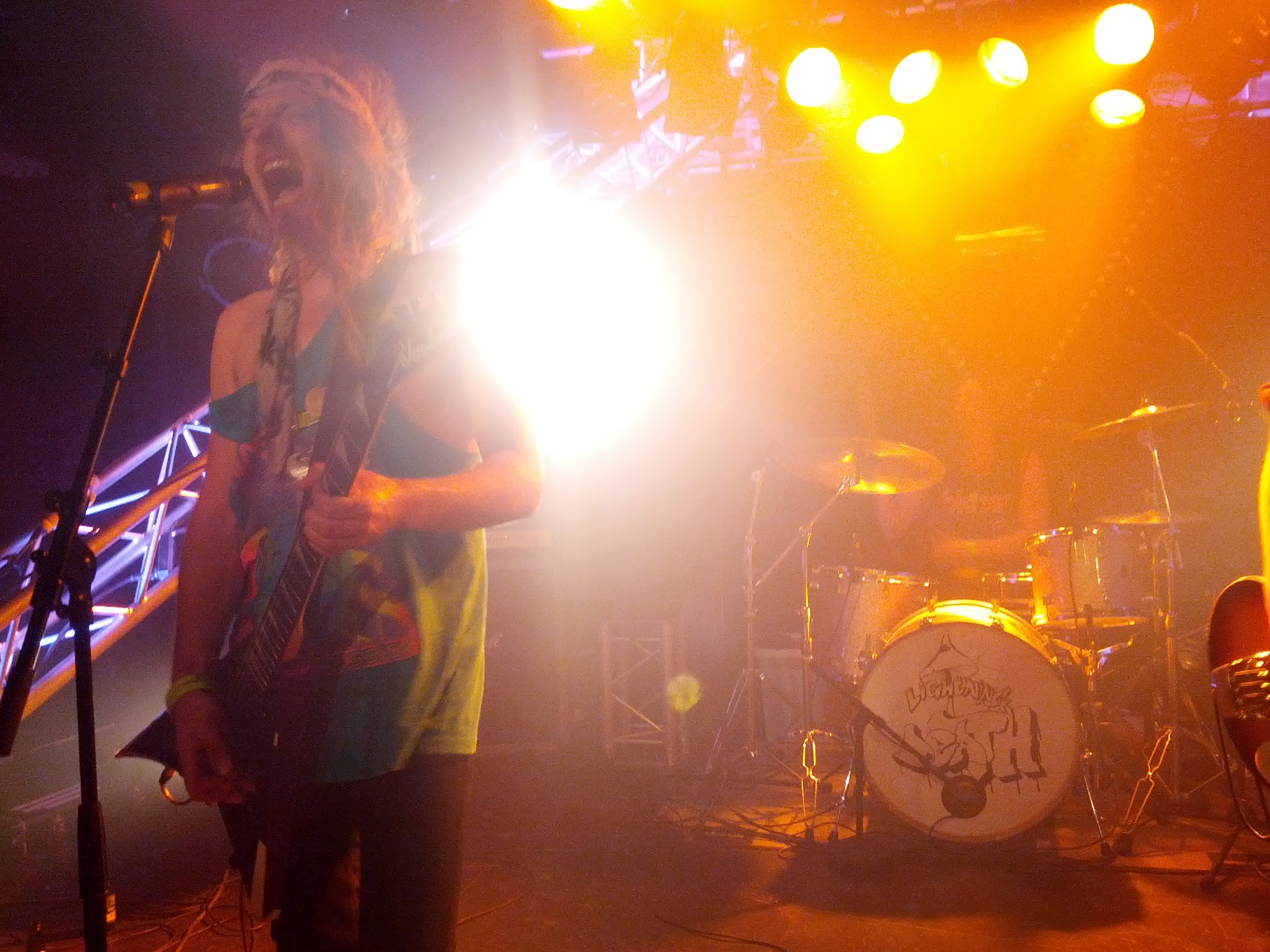
- Live at NISS, Oslo 2012

Background information
- Origin: Oslo, Norway
- Genres: Alternative rock, psychedelic rock
- Years active: 2007 - present
- Labels: Selective Notes; Razzia Records; Lightning Death Records
- Members: Aleksander; Ottar; Simon
- Past members: Sjur
- Website: Gerilja Website

Gerilja is an alternative rock band from Oslo, Norway. Their songs are about what they were told in the 1980s to expect of the future, so there is constant allusion to retro sci-fi. Their music uses analogue synthesisers instead of the current trend for all-digital studio production. Their stated musical influences are Megadeth, T-rex and 80's hip hop.

Their image follows the same retro-cool style of their music; bringing together all of the coolest elements of the 80's with the band's modern spin on it.

== History ==
Gerilja supported Mindless Self Indulgence on a European tour in 2008 and were part of a 20-date western European tour with Kvelertak and Årabrot in 2013.

== Awards ==
- NRK's Zoom/Urørt 2008

== Discography ==
=== Albums ===
- Step Up Your Game (2013)

=== Singles ===
- Animals (2013)

=== EPs ===
- Pink Slush Twilight (2009)

=== Demos ===
- Disco Shakedown (2008)

=== Film Clips ===
- Disco Shakedown (2008)
- Lightning Death (2012)
- Animals (2013)
