= Conspiration =

EP by The Fooo
- Released: 27 August 2014
- Recorded: 2013
- Genre: Pop
- Label: Artist House Stockholm

The Fooo chronology
Off the Grid (2014)	Conspiration (2014)	Serenade (2014)

Singles from Conspiration
- 1. "All Over the World" Released: 8 July 2014

Conspiration is the second extended play by Swedish pop boy band The Fooo. It was released in Sweden through The Artist House Stockholm on 27 August 2014. The album peaked at number 19 on the Swedish Albums Chart.

== Singles ==
"All Over the World" was released as the lead single from the EP on 8 July 2014.

== Track listing ==
No.	Title	Length
1.	"All Over the World"	2:57
2.	"Suitcase"	2:45
3.	"Jump"	2:57
4.	"What the Fooo"	3:05
5.	"Mmm"	3:06

== Charts ==
=== Weekly charts ===
Chart (2014)	Peak position
Swedish Albums (Sverigetopplistan)	19

== Release history ==
Region	Date	Format	Label
Sweden	27 August 2014	Digital download	Artist House Stockholm
