= Die Another Day (Beatrice Eli album) =

Studio album by Beatrice Eli
- Released: 22 October 2014
- Label: Razzia
- Producer: Saska Becker; Daniel Ledinsky

Beatrice Eli chronology
It's Over (2012)	Die Another Day (2014)

Singles from Die Another Day
- 1. "Girls" Released: 21 March 2014; 2. "Moment of Clarity" Released: 19 September 2014

Die Another Day is the debut studio album by Swedish recording artist Beatrice Eli, released on 22 October 2014 by Razzia Records. The album consists of 12 tracks, which were all produced by and cowritten with Saska Becker. The album is a personal statement of Eli's, embarking themes centered on relationships, love, passion, and break-ups.

== Track listing ==
No.	Title	Writer(s)	Producer(s)	Length
1.	"Moment of Clarity"	Beatrice Blennberger; Saska Becker; Daniel Ledinsky; Sara Allen (sample); Daryl Hall (sample); John Oates (sample)	Becker; Ledinsky	4:31
2.	"Die Another Day"	Blennberger; Ledinsky; Becker	Becker; Ledinsky	2:47
3.	"Equality"	Blennberger; Ledinsky; Becker; Rudie Edwards	Becker; Ledinsky	3:12
4.	"Girls"	Blennberger; Daniel Alexander; Erik Hassle; Ledinsky; Becker	Becker; Ledinsky	3:04
5.	"The Last Time" (featuring RUDIE)	Blennberger; Ledinsky; Becker; Edwards	Becker; Ledinsky	3:41
6.	"I'll Be Fine"	Blennberger; Becker	Becker; Ledinsky	3:47
7.	"Party in My Pants"	Blennberger; Becker	Becker; Ledinsky	3:02
8.	"Trust Issues"	Blennberger; Becker	Becker; Ledinsky	3:38
9.	"Coward"	Blennberger	Becker; Ledinsky	3:12
10.	"Violent Silence"	Blennberger; Ledinsky; Becker	Becker; Ledinsky	3:18
11.	"The Happy Ones"	Blennberger; Becker	Becker; Ledinsky	3:17
12.	"I Love You"	Blennberger; Ledinsky; Becker	Becker; Ledinsky	3:04
Total length:				40:33

- "Moment of Clarity" contains a sample of the song "Maneater" by Hall & Oates.

== Charts ==
Chart (2014)	Peak position
Swedish Albums (Sverigetopplistan)	25
