= Hurtful (song) =

Single by Erik Hassle

from the album Hassle and Pieces
- B-side: "The Thanks i Get"
- Released: 10 December 2008
- Genre: Pop
- Length: 3:03
- Label: Roxy, Ten
- Songwriters: Grizzly, Mack, Tommy Tysper, Hassle

Erik Hassle singles chronology
"Hurtful" (2008)	"Don't Bring Flowers" (2009)

"Hurtful" is a song by Swedish singer-songwriter Erik Hassle from his first studio album, Hassle (2009). The song was released on December 10, 2008, through Roxy Recordings as the lead single. In 2008, "Hurtful" ranked at #11 in Sweden and #2 in Denmark. The song was later added to his international debut album Pieces in 2010.

== Formats and track listings ==
(Released 12 January 2010)

1. "Hurtful" - 3:03

(Released November 2009)

1. "Hurtful" - 3:03
2. "Hurtful (Erik Hassle v.s. Penguin Prison)" - 4:35

(Released 10 December 2008)

1. "Hurtful" - 3:03
2. "The Thanks I Get" - 4:38

(Released 12 January 2010)

1. "Hurtful" - 3:03

(Released 7 February 2010)

1. "Hurtful"
2. "Hurtful (DC Breaks VIP Remix)"

(Released 7 February 2010)

1. "Hurtful (Jerome Isma-Ae Remix)" - 7:25
2. "Hurtful (Roqwell & I Sancho Remix)" - 6:41
3. "Hurtful (Zombie Disco Squad Remix)" - 7:16
4. "Hurtful (DC Breaks VIP Remix)" - 3:24

== Charts ==
Chart	Peak position
Denmark (Tracklisten)	2
Sweden (Sverigetopplistan)	11
UK Singles (OCC)	59
US Adult Pop Airplay (Billboard)	30

== Certifications ==
Region	Certification	Certified units/sales
Denmark (IFPI Danmark)	Gold	7,500^{^}
^{^} Shipments figures based on certification alone.
