= Don't Bring Flowers =

Single by Erik Hassle

from the album Pieces
- B-side: "The Thanks I Get"
- Released: 23 August 2009
- Genre: Pop
- Length: 3:15
- Label: Island
- Songwriters: Mack, Tysper, Grizzly, Erik Hassle
- Producers: Tysper & Grizzly

Erik Hassle singles chronology
"Don't Bring Flowers" (2009)	"Hurtful" (2010)

"Don't Bring Flowers" is a song by the Swedish singer-songwriter Erik Hassle. It was released in the United Kingdom on 23 August 2009 as the first single from his first album, Pieces. The song peaked at number 11 in Denmark and at number 25 in Sweden.

== Reception ==
David Balls of the British entertainment website Digital Spy said the song captures the greatness of Scandinavian pop music. He gave the song four stars (out of five) and wrote, "Over a minimalist-yet-epic synth backdrop, Hassle urges: "Don't bring flowers after I'm dead, save your givings for the living instead." Slightly morbid message aside, it's his vocals, unique and full of pleading innocence, that really stand out. We'll be keeping an eye on this one."

== Track listing ==
- UK digital download #1
1. "Don't Bring Flowers" – 3:15
2. "The Thanks I Get" – 3:31
- UK digital download #2
1. "Don't Bring Flowers" (Martin Roth NuStyle Remix) – 6:05
2. "Don't Bring Flowers" (Three Fingers Remix) – 5:08
3. "Don't Bring Flowers" (Ee-Sma Remix) – 8:20
4. "Don't Bring Flowers" (Plugs Remix) – 5:13

== Personnel ==
- Mack - music, lyrics
- Tysper - music, lyrics, production, recording, mixing
- Grizzly - music, lyrics
- Erik Hassle - music, lyrics
- Björn Engelmann - mastering

== Charts and certifications ==
=== Charts ===
Chart (2009)	Peak position
Denmark (Tracklisten)	11
Sweden (Sverigetopplistan)	25

=== Certifications ===
Country	Certifications (sales thresholds)
Denmark	Gold
