= Jimi Hendrix (song) =

Single by The Fooo Conspiracy
- Released: 4 December 2015
- Recorded: 2015
- Genre: Pop
- Length: 3:20
- Label: Artist House Stockholm
- Songwriter(s): Teal Douville, Kevin Hissink, Daniel Ledinsky, Marcus "Mack" Sepehrmanesh, Hassle Eric Kaj Persson, Jonathan Rotem

The Fooo Conspiracy singles chronology
"Run with Us" (2015)	"Jimi Hendrix" (2015)	"My Girl" (2016)

"Jimi Hendrix" is a song by Swedish pop boyband The Fooo Conspiracy. The song was released as a digital download in Sweden on 4 December 2015 through Artist House Stockholm. The song did not enter the Swedish Singles Chart, but peaked to number 13 on the Sweden Heatseeker Songs.

== Track listing ==
Digital download
No.	Title	Length
1.	"Jimi Hendrix"	3:20

== Chart performance ==
=== Weekly charts ===
Chart (2015)	Peak position
Sweden Heatseeker Songs (Sverigetopplistan)	13

== Release history ==
Region	Date	Format	Label
Sweden	4 December 2015	Digital download	Artist House Stockholm
