= Xmag =

Spanish monthly periodical

Xmag Magazine
- Editor: Ignacio Ferreyra Lugo
- Categories: Culture and fashion
- Frequency: Every two months
- Founded: 2019
- First issue: July 2019; 7 years ago
- Company: TEN Press
- Country: Spain, United Kingdom
- Based in: Madrid
- Language: Spanish, English
- Website: xmag.live en.xmag.live www.elplural.com/xmag/
- ISSN: 2660-7891

Xmag is a print magazine for young adults, published monthly by TEN Press Media SL. Created in 2019 in Córdoba, Argentina under the name INXCSS, the brand was later changed to Xmag when it relocated to Madrid, Spain. Since April 2022, C'mon Productions is no longer part of the partnership.

== History ==
Since its inception in Argentina as INXCSS, it has been published in a digital format with Ignacio Ferreyra Lugo serving as its editor-in-chief to this day. The target audience of the magazine is young people between the ages of 17 and 34, although it also covers topics for a more adult audience.

Since 2020, the magazine is only published for the Spanish market, although its main readership is located in Spain, Mexico, and Argentina.

In 2022, the communication agency that publishes the magazine signed agreements with Brittany Ferries, Ouigo Spain, and Moment Care to distribute its content in the United Kingdom and France, in addition to its existing presence in Spain.

Since 2024, the magazine has been published in print in two versions, nationally in Spain, and in its UK version in the United Kingdom, Italy, and the Netherlands.

In October 2025, Xmag Spain joined the Spanish digital newspaper El Plural as its luxury, fashion, and pop culture vertical, expanding its editorial presence within the national media landscape.

== Covers ==
The most prominent personalities that have appeared in Xmag include Kiernan Shipka, Rebecca Black, Maggie Civantos, Maite Perroni, Andrea Duro, Alejandro Speitzer, Mina El Hammani, Mau y Ricky, Abraham Mateo, Marta Hazas, Edvin Ryding, Ana Mena, Omar Rudberg, Belinda, Blanca Suárez, Lali Espósito, Perrie Edwards, and Brandon Flynn.
