= Elias Hurtig =

Swedish singer and rapper

Elias Hurtig (born 1997) is a Swedish singer and rapper. In 2022, Hurtig got a number 1 hit on Sverigetopplistan with the song ”30 Personer” while featuring on the song with Hov1. He was previously a member of the group Hov1.

== Discography ==
=== Singles ===
| Title | Year | Peak chart positions | Album |
| Title | Year | SWE | Album |
|---|---|---|---|
| "30 Personer" | 2022 | 1 | Non-album singles |
| "En vanlig tid, en vanlig plats" (with the Nowhere Boy and Sofijah) | 2023 | — (Note: "En vanlig tid, en vanlig plats" did not enter the Swedish Singellista Chart, but peaked at number 10 on the Swedish Heatseeker Chart.) | Non-album singles |
