= Off the Grid (The Fooo album) =

Studio album by The Fooo
- Released: 2 April 2014
- Recorded: 2013
- Genre: Pop
- Length: 35:53
- Label: The Artist House

The Fooo chronology
The Fooo (2013)	Off the Grid (2014)	Conspiration (2014)

Singles from Off the Grid
- 1. "Build a Girl" Released: 16 August 2013; 2. "King of the Radio" Released: 21 February 2014

Off the Grid is the debut studio album by Swedish pop boy band The Fooo. It was released in Sweden through The Artist House on 2 April 2014. The album peaked at number one on the Swedish Albums Chart.

== Singles ==
"Build a Girl" was released as the lead single from the album on 16 August 2013. The song peaked at number 41 on the Swedish Singles Chart. "King of the Radio" was released as the second single from the album on 21 February 2014.

== Track listing ==
Off the Grid track listing
No.	Title	Length
1.	"Poping It"	2:42
2.	"The Link Up"	3:11
3.	"King of the Radio" (Radio)	3:16
4.	"Whistle"	2:33
5.	"Build a Girl"	3:05
6.	"Dumbstruck"	2:57
7.	"Lose Our Lungs"	3:18
8.	"Fridays Are Forever"	2:23
9.	"Kangaroos"	2:24
10.	"Volcano"	3:10
11.	"97 Ways"	3:50
12.	"Build a Girl" (acoustic)	3:04
Total length:		35:53

== Charts ==
=== Weekly charts ===
Weekly chart performance for Off the Grid
Chart (2014)	Peak position
Swedish Albums (Sverigetopplistan)	1

=== Year-end charts ===
Year-end chart performance for Off the Grid
Chart (2014)	Position
Swedish Albums (Sverigetopplistan)	35

== Release history ==
Release history for Off the Grid
Region	Date	Format	Label
Sweden	2 April 2014	Digital download	The Artist House
