= Razzia Records =

Swedish record label

- Founded: 2000
- Distributor: Sony Music
- Genre: Rock, Pop
- Country of origin: Sweden
- Location: Stockholm
- Official website: razziarecords.se

Razzia Records is an independent record label based in Stockholm, Sweden. It is part of the Family Tree Music group along with Catchy Tunes and Family Tree Music, which are together distributed by Sony Music.

The label is run by Martina Ledinsky and Daniel Ledinsky. Their first release was Magic Villa by Tomas Rusiak in 2000. On 20 September 2011, it was also announced that Razzia Records would release Joakim Thåström's album, Beväpna dig med wingar, in early 2012.

== Artists signed to Razzia Records ==
- Adiam
- Beatrice Eli
- Blood Stain Child
- David Sandström
- Dundertåget
- Firefox AK
- Gerilja
- Hello Saferide
- I Are Droid
- Joel Alme
- Jonna Lee
- Konie
- Maia Hirasawa
- Mange Schmidt
- NiccoKick
- Petra Marklund
- Sakert!
- Svenska Kyrkan/David Lindh
- The Plan
- They Live By Night
- Thunder Express
- Timo Räisänen
- Tomas Rusiak
