= My Girl (The Fooo Conspiracy song) =

Single by The Fooo Conspiracy

from the album FO&O
- Released: 29 January 2016
- Recorded: 2015
- Genre: Pop; rock
- Length: 3:10
- Label: Artist House Stockholm
- Songwriter(s): Timothy Caifeldt, Samuel John Kvist, Daniel Ledinsky, Erik Hassle

The Fooo Conspiracy singles chronology
"Jimi Hendrix" (2015)	"My Girl" (2016)	"Summer Love" (2016)

"My Girl" is a song by Swedish pop boyband The Fooo Conspiracy. The song was released as a digital download in Sweden on 29 January 2016 through Artist House Stockholm. The song has peaked at number 58 on the Swedish Singles Chart. The single was re-released on 17 June 2016 featuring vocals from Danny Saucedo.

== Music video ==
A video to accompany the release of "My Girl" was first released onto YouTube on 30 January 2016 at a total length of three minutes and eleven seconds. A second music video for the song was released onto YouTube on 30 January 2016.

== Track listing ==
Digital download
No.	Title	Length
1.	"My Girl"	3:10

Digital download
No.	Title	Length
1.	"My Girl" (feat. Danny Saucedo) (Euro Latino Version)	3:01

== Chart performance ==
=== Weekly charts ===
Chart (2016)	Peak position
Sweden (Sverigetopplistan)	58

== Release history ==
Region	Date	Format	Label
Sweden	29 January 2016	Digital download	Artist House Stockholm
