= Pieces (Erik Hassle album) =

Studio album by Erik Hassle
- Released: 22 February 2010
- Genre: Pop rock, Pop, synthpop
- Label: Island, Universal Republic
- Producer: Grizzly, Tommy Tysper, Elof Loelv, Kim Wennerström, Pete Davis, Fredrik Berger

Erik Hassle chronology
Hassle (2009)	Pieces (2010)	We Dance (2012)

Singles from Pieces
- 1. "Don't Bring Flowers" Released: 23 August 2009; 2. "Hurtful" Released: 2 February 2010

Professional ratings
Review scores
Source	Rating
musicOMH	4/5 stars
Slant Magazine	1/5 stars

Pieces is the international debut studio album by Swedish singer-songwriter Erik Hassle, released on 18 January 2010 in Scandinavia and in the United Kingdom on 22 February 2010. The album features tracks from his Swedish debut album Hassle (2009), with the tracks "Don't Bring Flowers", "The Thanks I Get, "Bitter End", and "Wanna Be Loved" being remixed for the international market, and the new song "Amelia". The album's second single "Hurtful" was released in the UK on 8 February, and peaked at number 59 on the UK Singles Chart. The album, however, failed to chart within the top 40.

== Track listing ==
No.	Title	Writer(s)	Producer(s)	Length
1.	"Bump in the Road"	Grizzly, Mack, Erik Hassle	Grizzly	4:00
2.	"Hurtful"	Grizzly, Mack, Tommy Tysper, Hassle	Grizzly & Tysper	3:03
3.	"Don't Bring Flowers"	Grizzly, Mack, Tysper, Hassle	Grizzly & Tysper	3:15
4.	"Isn't It Obvious"	Fredrik Berger, Hassle	Elof Loelv, Kim Wennerström	3:26
5.	"The Thanks I Get"	Grizzly, Hassle, Tysper, Mack	Grizzly & Tysper	4:33
6.	"Standing Where You Left Me"	Laura Pergolizzi, Alexander Kronlund, Grizzly, Tysper, Mack	Grizzly & Tysper	3:20
7.	"Bitter End"	Hassle, Tysper	Grizzly & Tysper, Pete Davis	3:53
8.	"First Time"	Grizzly, Mack, Tysper, Hassle	Grizzly & Tysper	3:05
9.	"Love Me to Pieces"	Hassle, Tysper, Max Martin, Mack	Tysper	3:09
10.	"Wanna Be Loved"	Grizzly, Mack, Tysper, Hassle	Grizzly & Tysper	3:59
11.	"Back to Bed"	Berger, Grizzly, Hassle	Grizzly, Berger	4:02
12.	"Amelia"	Grizzly, Mack, Tysper, Hassle	Grizzly & Tysper	3:14

Amazon.com bonus track
No.	Title	Writer(s)	Producer(s)	Length
13.	"Don't Bring Flowers" (Everything Everything remix)	Grizzly, Mack, Tysper, Hassle	Grizzly & Tysper	4:21

== Release history ==
Region	Date	Label	Format
Sweden	18 January 2010	Island Records	CD, digital download
United Kingdom	22 February 2010	Island Records	CD, digital download
United States	9 March 2010	Universal Republic	Digital download
