= Beatrice Eli =

Musical artist

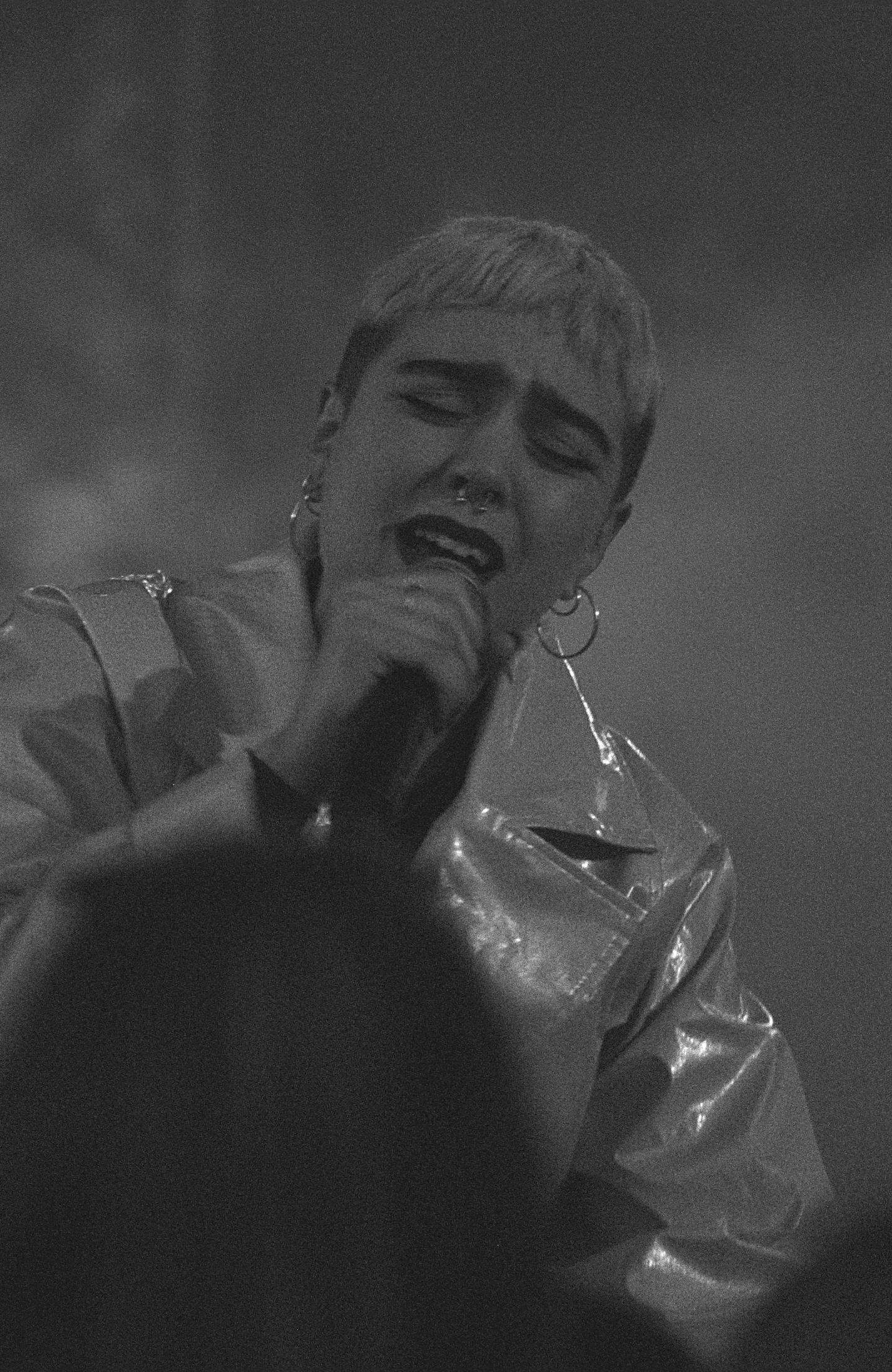
- Beatrice Eli in 2015

Background information
- Born: Beatrice Elin Elisabeth Blennberger; 9 January 1987 (age 39); Stockholm, Sweden
- Genres: Indie pop; alternative dance; folk; alternative or Indie folk
- Occupations: Singer; musician; songwriter
- Instruments: Vocals
- Years active: 2012–present
- Labels: Razzia; Sony; Columbia; Epic

Beatrice Elin Elisabeth Blennberger (born 9 January 1987), better known by her stage name Beatrice Eli, is a Swedish musician, singer, and songwriter from Stockholm, Sweden. She first gained attention with her 2012 single "The Conqueror", which was released on her debut EP It's Over. The EP contained 4 songs and was released in October 2012. Beatrice Eli's debut album, Die Another Day, was released on 22 October 2014 through Razzia Records.

Eli says she was raised by deeply religious Christian parents, and her style is different to theirs. She told a journalist that "they understand that I didn't become the nice Church girl they wanted me to be." As for her songwriting, she says, "I've always written about my feelings." She says Die Another Day "is about sex, drugs and girls."

She is a lesbian and prefers that term over gay, as she told a journalist in 2015. Beatrice used to be in a relationship with Swedish rapper Silvana Imam. She features on the track "Shhh" on Imam's second album Naturkraft, released in 2016. Beatrice's single "Careful" from the Careful EP was nominated for "Song of The Year" at the Gaffa Awards 2018.

== Discography ==
=== Albums ===
Title	Album details	Peak positions	Certification
Title	Album details	SWE	Certification
Die Another Day	Released: 22 October 2014; Label: Razzia Records; Format: CD, digital download	25	

=== Extended plays ===
Title	Album details
It's Over	Released: 19 October 2012; Label: Razzia Records; Format: CD, digital download
The Careful EP	Released: 8 September 2017; Label: Razzia Records; Format: Digital download

== Collaborations ==
Eli was featured on the song Godhet by Swedish rock band Kent in their 2014 album, Tigerdrottningen. She performed live with the group during performances that summer.
