= FO&O =

Swedish pop boy band

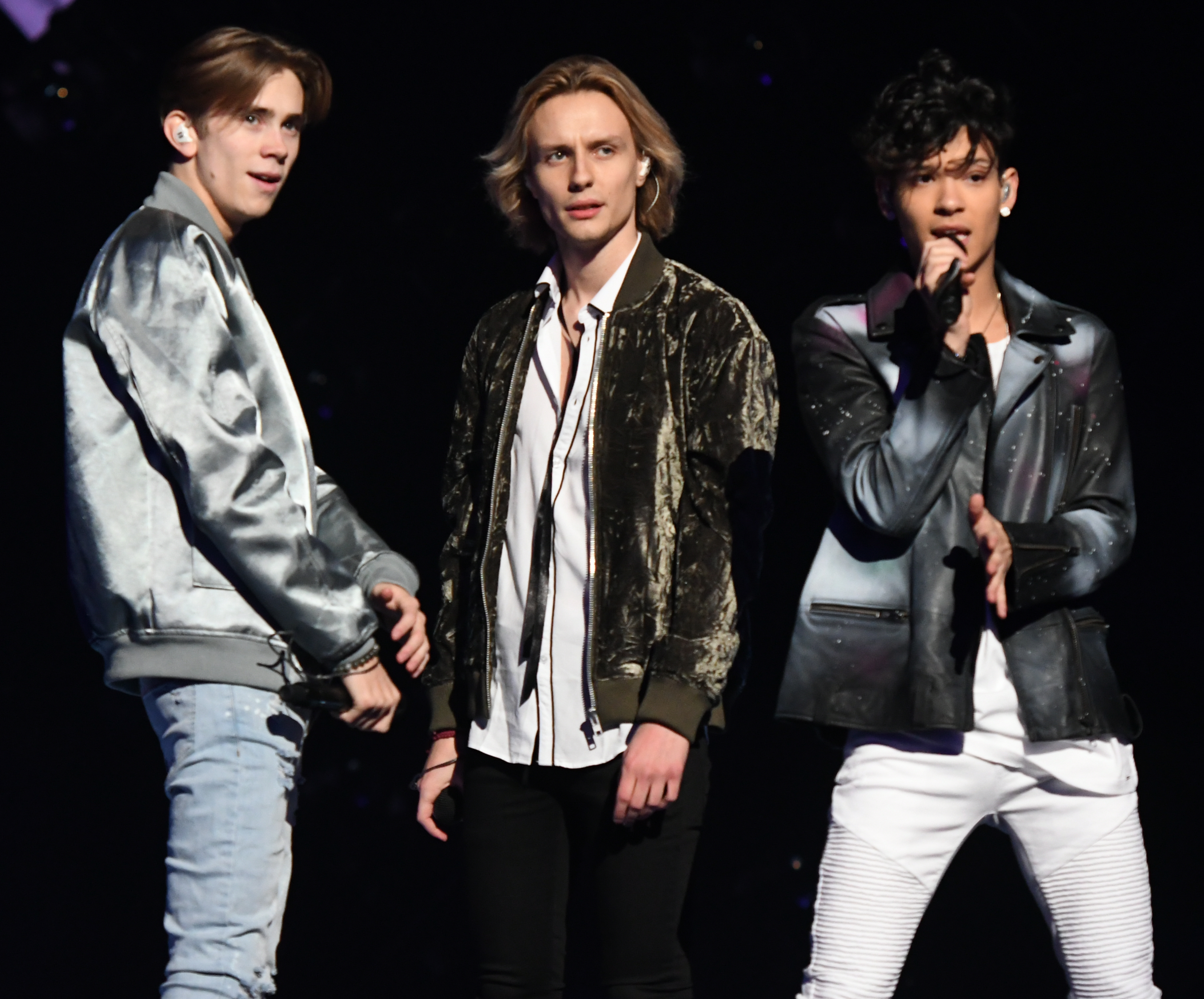
- FO&O at Melodifestivalen 2017. Left to right: Sandman, Enestad, Rudberg.

Background information
- Also known as: TFC, The Fooo, The Fooo Conspiracy
- Origin: Stockholm, Sweden
- Genres: Pop
- Years active: 2013–2017
- Labels: TEN; Artist House Stockholm; RED Associated Labels
- Members: Oscar Enestad; Omar Rudberg; Felix Sandman
- Past members: Oscar "Olly" Molander

FO&O (formerly The Fooo and The Fooo Conspiracy) was a Swedish pop boy band formed in Stockholm in 2013. The group consisted of Oscar Enestad, Omar Rudberg, Felix Sandman and Oscar "Olly" Molander (until his departure in 2016).

In September 2017, the band announced an indefinite hiatus to focus on solo projects.

== Career ==
=== 2013–2015: Off the Grid ===
In 2013, the band started out doing street performances in the streets of Stockholm while uploading the footage onto YouTube for their fans (called 'Foooers') to see. During 2013, the band made several television performances, at the gala Tillsammans för Världens Barn, and at the Idol 2013 finale in Globen. The band became known after Canadian singer Justin Bieber and his manager saw a video clip of the band on YouTube. Bieber's manager called the Fooo's management and asked if the band would want to become the opening act for Bieber's concert in Globen in April 2013 which the band accepted. The Fooo's first charting single was "Build a Girl", which reached number 41 on Sverigetopplistan, the official Swedish singles chart. The song also charted on Digilistanchart reaching number 3. The Fooo's first EP, the self-titled The Fooo, was released on 16 August 2013 by The Artist House. They won the Swedish Grammis award "Innovator of the Year". Their debut studio album Off the Grid topped the official Swedish Albums Chart in its first week of release on 2 April 2014. On 27 August 2014, they released their second extended play, Conspiration. The EP peaked at number 19 on the Swedish Albums Chart. They released their third extended play, Serenade in the United States on 30 October 2014. They released Coordinates as their fourth extended play on 7 January 2015. The EP peaked at number 33 on the Swedish Albums Chart. "Wild Hearts" was released as the lead single from the EP on 19 January 2015. They released the single "Run with Us" on 5 June 2015, followed by the single "Jimi Hendrix" on 4 December 2015.

=== 2016–2017: Melodifestivalen and FO&O ===
On 29 January 2016, they released the single "My Girl". The song peaked at number 58 on the Swedish Singles Chart. It was followed by the single "Summer Love", released on 29 April 2016 and peaking at number 54 on the Swedish Singles Chart. They re-released "My Girl" on 17 June 2016, featuring vocals from Danny Saucedo. On 28 October 2016, they released the single "Who Doesn't Love Love". In November 2016, Oscar "Olly" Molander left the band. On 30 November 2016, the Fooo Conspiracy was announced as one of the 28 acts to compete in Melodifestivalen 2017 with the song "Gotta Thing About You", under the new name of FO&O. They qualified to "andra chansen" from the third semi-final and later qualified for the final, winning against De Vet Du's "Roadtrip". They placed eleventh in the final.

FO&O announced the release of their self-titled album on social media, including "Gotta Thing About You" and new single "So So Good".

In September 2017, after speculation in the Swedish press about the band's split, the band confirmed that they were on hiatus and were taking time to pursue solo projects.

== Members ==
=== Current members ===
- Oscar Enestad, born 21 February 1997 (age 28), in Sköndal, Stockholm
- Felix Sandman, born 25 October 1998 (age 27), in Värmdö, Stockholm County
- Omar Rudberg, born 12 November 1998 (age 27), in Anaco, Venezuela (moved to Kungsbacka with his mother at six years of age)

=== Past members ===
- Oscar "Olly" Molander, born 24 February 1997 (age 28), in Lidingö, Stockholm County

== Discography ==
=== Albums ===
Title	Details	Peak chart positions
Title	Details	SWE
Credited as the Fooo
Off the Grid	Released: 2 April 2014; Format: Digital download, CD; Label: The Artist House	1
Credited as FO&O
FO&O	Released: 12 May 2017; Format: Digital download, CD; Label: The Artist House	35

=== Extended plays ===
Title	Details	Peak chart positions
Title	Details	SWE
Credited as the Fooo
The Fooo	Released: 16 August 2013; Format: Digital download; Label: Artist House Stockholm	—
Conspiration	Released: 27 August 2014; Format: Digital download; Label: Artist House Stockholm	19
Credited as the Fooo Conspiracy
Serenade	Released: 30 October 2014; Format: Digital download; Label: RED Associated Labels	—
Coordinates	Released: 7 January 2015; Format: Digital download; Label: Artist House Stockholm	33

=== Singles ===
Year	Title	Peak chart positions	Certifications	Album
Year	Title	SWE	Certifications	Album
Credited as the Fooo
"Build a Girl"	2013	41		Off the Grid and FO&O
"It's Time to Make a Wish"	2013	—		Non-album single
"King of the Radio"	2014	—		Off the Grid
"All Over the World"	2014	—		Conspiration
Credited as the Fooo Conspiracy
"Wild Hearts"	2015	—		Coordinates
"Run with Us"	2015	— (Note: "Run With Us" did not enter the Swedish Singles Chart (Sverigetopplistan), but peaked to number 10 on the Sweden Heatseeker Songs.)		FO&O
"Jimi Hendrix"	2015	— (Note: "Jimi Hendrix" did not enter the Swedish Singles Chart (Sverigetopplistan), but peaked at number 13 on the Sweden Heatseeker Songs.)		Non-album single
"My Girl"	2016	58		FO&O
"Summer Love"	2016	54	GLF: Gold	FO&O
"Who Doesn't Love Love"	2016	— (Note: "Who Doesn't Love Love" did not enter the Swedish Singles Chart (Sverigetopplistan), but peaked to number 8 on the Sweden Heatseeker Songs.)		FO&O
Credited as FO&O
"Gotta Thing About You"	2017	7	GLF: 2× Platinum	FO&O
"So So Good"	2017	— (Note: "So So Good" did not enter the Swedish Singles Chart (Sverigetopplistan), but peaked to number 18 on the Sweden Heatseeker Songs.)		FO&O
"Hurt Like We Did"	2017	—		FO&O
"—" denotes a single that did not chart or was not released.
