= Run with Us (The Fooo Conspiracy song) =

Single by The Fooo Conspiracy

from the album FO&O
- Released: 5 June 2015
- Recorded: 2015
- Genre: Pop
- Length: 2:33
- Label: Artist House Stockholm
- Songwriter(s): Emanuel Abrahamsson, Jerker-Olov Hansson, Simon Hassle, Louise Lennartsson

The Fooo Conspiracy singles chronology
"Wild Hearts" (2015)	"Run with Us" (2015)	"Jimi Hendrix" (2015)

"Run with Us" is a song by Swedish pop boyband The Fooo Conspiracy. The song was released as a digital download in Sweden on 5 June 2015 through Artist House Stockholm. The song did not enter the Swedish Singles Chart, but peaked to number 10 on the Sweden Heatseeker Songs.

== Track listing ==
Digital download
No.	Title	Length
1.	"Run with Us"	2:33

== Chart performance ==
=== Weekly charts ===
Chart (2015)	Peak position
Sweden Heatseeker Songs (Sverigetopplistan)	10

== Release history ==
Region	Date	Format	Label
Sweden	5 June 2015	Digital download	Artist House Stockholm
