= Build a Girl =

2013 single by FO&O

Single by The Fooo

from the album Off the Grid, The Fooo & FO&O
- Released: 16 August 2013
- Recorded: 2013
- Genre: Pop
- Length: 3:05
- Label: Artist House Stockholm
- Songwriter(s): Joleen Belle: Herbie Crichlow; Jimmy Richard; Louis Schoorl

The Fooo singles chronology
"Build a Girl" (2013)	"King of the Radio" (2014)
The Fooo
EP by The Fooo
- Released: 16 August 2013
- Recorded: 2013
- Studio: Artist House Stockholm
- Genre: Pop
The Fooo chronology
The Fooo (2013)	Off the Grid (2014)

"Build a Girl" is a song by Swedish pop boy band The Fooo. The song was released as a digital download in Sweden on 16 August 2013 through Artist House Stockholm. It was released as the lead single from their debut studio album Off the Grid (2014). The song is also included on their debut extended play The Fooo (2013). The song has peaked at number 41 on the Swedish Singles Chart.

== Track listing ==
The Fooo - EP
No.	Title	Length
1.	"Kangaroos"	2:23
2.	"Build a Girl"	3:05
3.	"The Link Up"	3:11
4.	"Man Over Board"	3:11
5.	"Troublemaker"	2:58

== Charts ==
=== Weekly charts ===
Chart (2016)	Peak position
Sweden (Sverigetopplistan)	41

== Release history ==
Region	Date	Format	Label
Sweden	16 August 2013	Digital download	Artist House Stockholm
