= Who Doesn't Love Love =

Single by The Fooo Conspiracy

from the album FO&O
- Released: 28 October 2016
- Recorded: 2015/16
- Genre: Pop
- Length: 2:39
- Label: Artist House Stockholm
- Songwriter(s): Robert Habolin, Jerker-Olov Hansson, Omar Rudberg

The Fooo Conspiracy singles chronology
"Summer Love" (2016)	"Who Doesn't Love Love" (2016)	"Gotta Thing About You" (2017)

"Who Doesn't Love Love" is a song by Swedish pop boyband The Fooo Conspiracy. The song was released as a digital download in Sweden on 28 October 2016 through Artist House Stockholm. The song did not enter the Swedish Singles Chart, but peaked to number 8 on the Swedish Heatseeker Chart.

== Music video ==
A video to accompany the release of "Who Doesn't Love Love" was first released onto YouTube on 10 November 2016 at a total length of two minutes and thirty-six seconds.

== Track listing ==
Digital download
No.	Title	Length
1.	"Who Doesn't Love Love"	2:39
2.	"Who Doesn't Love Love" (Trop/House Radio Remix)	2:48

== Charts ==
=== Weekly charts ===
Chart (2016)	Peak position
Sweden Heatseeker (Sverigetopplistan)	8

== Release history ==
Region	Date	Format	Label
Sweden	28 October 2016	Digital download	Artist House Stockholm
