= Adiam =

Eritrean-Swedish singer

- Born: Adiam Dymott; 17 December 1982 (age 43)
- Origin: Uppsala, Sweden
- Occupations: Singer-songwriter, musician
- Years active: 2008–present
- Label: Razzia

Adiam (born 17 December 1982), previously known by her full name Adiam Dymott, is an Eritrean-Swedish singer. Her debut album, Adiam Dymott, was released on 18 March 2009 on Swedish indie label Razzia Records. It included the singles "Miss You" and "Pizza".

== Biography ==
Adiam, as well as her parents, are from Asmara and met in Italy. The couple moved to Uppsala, Sweden where their daughter was born in 1982. According to Adiam, her mother named her after an Eritrean queen. Adiam started buying records first from the hip hop-section with favorites Notorious B.I.G. and The Wu-Tang Clan. At the same time, she describes herself as having been an "MTV child," listening to Nirvana and Garbage.

At 18, Adiam came to Stockholm where she took her first steps as a vocalist. Because of her job as a receptionist at a studio, whenever the songwriters/producers needed a singer they would ask her to enter the studio. Eventually, these demo recordings led to a contract with Razzia Records. She used to hang out with hip hop artists such as DJ Taro, Mange Schmidt, DJ Viet-Naam and Thomas Rusiak. Once Dymott and Rusiak realized they both shared a love for rock music they decided to work together.

Adiam's song "Miss You" is on the EA Sports video game, FIFA 10. It was the first single from her debut album released in March 2009. According to MTV Iggy, the song was performed for the first time live at the prestigious gala P3 Guild 2009 at Scandinavium, Gothenburg.

Her single "Catch Me If You Can" is a collaboration with Mando Diao's Björn Dixgård.

Adiam also has a new Swedish-language project with Thomas Rusiak and rappers Näääk and Nimo.

== Band ==
Dymott's touring band consists of herself on lead vocals, Thomas Rusiak on guitar and backup vocals, Harri Mänty on guitar, Mattias Bärjed on guitar, Inge Johansson on bass and Fredrik Okazaki Bergström on drums. Razzia Records refers to Dymott's band as an "all-star band" because all of its members have musical careers apart from Dymott's. Thomas Rusiak is a Swedish rapper, hip hop producer, musician and singer. Harri Mänty is a former member of Kent, a successful Swedish rock band from the late 90s and 00s. Mattias Bärjed is a member of the Swedish rock band The Soundtrack of Our Lives. Inge Johansson is a member of The (International) Noise Conspiracy. Fredrik Okazaki Bergström is a member of a band that debuted in June 2008 called I Are Droid. Rusiak also produced the debut album, Adiam Dymott.

== Personal life ==
Adiam lives in Stockholm. Her body is covered with tattoos of her siblings' names. She speaks English, Swedish and, in her own words, "poor Tigrinya". She also has a tattoo of The Notorious B.I.G., whom she described as "simply an incredibly ingenious storyteller." In an interview with The Source, Adiam said, "I love how [Biggie] plays with different characters in his songs. It has an almost theatrical quality. And his lyrics are often not only pretty dark, but also brutally honest at times."

== Discography ==
=== Albums ===
- Adiam Dymott (2009)
- Black Wedding (2016)
