= So So Good =

Single by FO&O

from the album FO&O
- Released: 5 May 2017
- Recorded: 2015
- Genre: Pop
- Length: 3:20
- Label: Artist House Stockholm

FO&O singles chronology
"Gotta Thing About You" (2017)	"So So Good" (2017)	"Hurt Like We Did" (2017)

"So So Good" is a song by Swedish pop boyband FO&O. The song was released as a digital download in Sweden on 5 May 2017 through Artist House Stockholm. The song did not enter the Swedish Singles Chart, but peaked to number 18 on the Sweden Heatseeker Songs.

== Music video ==
A music video to accompany the release of "So So Good" was first released onto YouTube on 5 May 2017 at a total length of two minutes and fourteen seconds.

== Charts ==
=== Weekly charts ===
Chart (2017)	Peak position
Sweden Heatseeker (Sverigetopplistan)	18

== Release history ==
Region	Date	Format	Label
Sweden	5 May 2017	Digital download	Artist House Stockholm
