= Gotta Thing About You =

2017 single by FO&O

Single by FO&O

from the album FO&O
- Released: 26 February 2017
- Recorded: 2016
- Genre: Electropop
- Length: 2:56
- Label: Artist House Stockholm
- Songwriter(s): Robert "Mutt" Lange; Tony Nilsson

FO&O singles chronology
"Who Doesn't Love Love" (2016)	"Gotta Thing About You" (2017)	"So So Good" (2017)

"Gotta Thing About You" is a song recorded by Swedish boyband FO&O. The song was released as a digital download in Sweden on 26 February 2017 and peaked at number 10 on the Swedish Singles Chart. It took part in Melodifestivalen 2017, and qualified to the second chance round from the third semi-final on 18 February 2017. The song qualified from the second chance round on 4 March 2017. It was written by Robert "Mutt" Lange and Tony Nilsson.

== Charts ==
=== Weekly charts ===
Chart (2017)	Peak position
Sweden (Sverigetopplistan)	7

=== Year-end charts ===
Chart (2017)	Position
Sweden (Sverigetopplistan)	97

=== Certifications ===
Region	Certification	Certified units/sales
Sweden (GLF)	2× Platinum	16,000,000^{†}
^{†} Streaming-only figures based on certification alone.

== Release history ==
Region	Date	Format	Label
Sweden	26 February 2017	Digital download	Artist House Stockholm
