= Seeb discography =

- Studio albums: 1
- EPs: 2
- Singles: 30
- Remixes: 15

Norwegian music production duo Seeb have released one studio album, three extended plays, thirty singles, and fifteen remixes.

== Studio albums ==
| Title | Details | Peak chart positions |
| Title | Details | NOR |
|---|---|---|
| Sad in Scandinavia | Released: 29 January 2021; Label: Universal; Format: Digital download, streaming | 25 |

== Extended plays ==
| Title | Details | Peak chart positions | | |
| Title | Details | NOR | FIN | SWE |
|---|---|---|---|---|
| Intro to Seeb | Released: 11 Nov 2016; Label: Universal; Format: Digital download | — | — | — |
| Nice to Meet You | Released: 20 April 2018; Label: Universal; Format: Digital download | — | 41 | 44 |
| Sad in Scandinavia (Part 1) | Released: 24 July 2020; Label: Universal; Format: Digital download | 11 | — | — |

== Singles ==
| Title | Year | Peak chart positions | | | | Album/EP |
| Title | Year | NOR | FRA | PRT | SWE | Album/EP |
|---|---|---|---|---|---|---|
| "Simple Life" | 2015 | — | — | — | — | Non-album single |
| "Breathe" (featuring Neev) | 2016 | 7 | 54 | 76 | 13 | Intro to Seeb |
| "What Do You Love" (featuring Jacob Banks) | 2016 | 2 | — | — | 20 | Intro to Seeb |
| "Under Your Skin" (with R. City) | 2017 | 30 | — | — | — | Non-album singles |
| "Boys in the Street" (with Greg Holden) | 2017 | — | — | — | 79 | Non-album singles |
| "Rich Love" (with OneRepublic) | 2017 | 7 | — | — | 10 | Non-album singles |
| "Cruel World" (with Skip Marley) | 2017 | 26 | — | — | — | Non-album singles |
| "Alive" (with MrJaxx) | 2017 | — | — | — | — | Non-album singles |
| "Lost Boys" (with Ocean Park Standoff) | 2018 | — | — | — | — | Non-album singles |
| "Drink About" (featuring Dagny) | 2018 | 2 | — | — | 25 | Nice to Meet You and Sad in Scandinavia |
| "Grip" (with Bastille) | 2018 | 25 | — | — | — (Note: "Grip" did not enter the Swedish Singellista Chart, but peaked at number three on the Swedish Heatseeker Chart.) | Other People's Heartache, Pt. 4 and Sad in Scandinavia |
| "Free to Go" (with Highasakite) | 2019 | 14 | — | — | — (Note: "Free to Go" did not enter the Swedish Singellista Chart, but peaked at number 18 on the Swedish Heatseeker Chart.) | Sad in Scandinavia |
| "Fade Out" (with Olivia O'Brien and Space Primates) | 2019 | — | — | — | — | Sad in Scandinavia |
| "Bigger Than" (with Justin Jesso) | 2019 | 22 | — | — | — | Non-album single |
| "Kiss Somebody" (with Julie Bergan) | 2020 | 12 | — | — | — (Note: "Kiss Somebody" did not enter the Swedish Singellista Chart, but peaked at number one on the Swedish Heatseeker Chart.) | Hard Feelings: Ventricle 2 |
| "Best I Can" (with American Authors) | 2020 | — | — | — | — | Counting Down |
| "Unfamiliar" (Note: "Unfamiliar" is also included on the deluxe edition of Hrvy's debut studio album, Can Anybody Hear Me?) (with Goodboys and Hrvy) | 2020 | — | — | — | — | Sad in Scandinavia |
| "Sad in Scandinavia" (with Zak Abel) | 2020 | — | — | — | — | Sad in Scandinavia |
| "Don't You Wanna Play?" (with Julie Bergan) | 2020 | — | — | — | — | Sad in Scandinavia |
| "Why Change" (with Andreas Moe) | 2020 | — | — | — | — | Sad in Scandinavia |
| "Safe Zone" (with Emelie Hollow) | 2020 | — | — | — | — | Sad in Scandinavia |
| "Colourblind" (with St. Lundi) | 2020 | — | — | — | — | Sad in Scandinavia |
| "Feel It Again" (with Dan Caplen and Svidden) | 2020 | — | — | — | — | Sad in Scandinavia |
| "Whiteout" | 2021 | — | — | — | — | Sad in Scandinavia |
| "The Things You Do" (with SIVV) | 2021 | — | — | — | — | Sad in Scandinavia |
| "Sleepwalk" (with Andreas Moe) | 2021 | — | — | — | — | Sad in Scandinavia |
| "Run It Up" (with K Camp and Tim North featuring Marty James) | 2021 | — | — | — | — | Sad in Scandinavia |
| "Numbers" (with Simon Jonasson) | 2021 | — | — | — | — | Sad in Scandinavia |
| "Last Dance" (with Kiddo) | 2021 | — | — | — | — | Sad in Scandinavia |
| "Sweet Dreams & Dynamite" (with Nina Nesbitt) | 2021 | — | — | — | — | Non-album singles |
| "Would You Lie" (with Alexander Stewart) | 2022 | — | — | — | — | Non-album singles |
| "Submarine" (with BANNERS and SUPER-Hi) | 2023 | — | — | — | — | Non-album singles |
| "Golden Ticket" (with CLMD and JOKI) | 2023 | | | | | Non-album singles |
| "sleeping satellite" (with Matrē) | 2023 | — | — | — | — | |
| "You" (with Svidden) | 2023 | | | | | |
| "Before You Go" | 2024 | | | | | |
| "Someone's Gonna Love Ya" (with Petey Martin) | 2024 | | | | | |
| "Be Like That" (featuring JP Cooper) | 2025 | | | | | |
"—" denotes a recording that did not chart or was not released in that territory.

== Remixes ==
| Title | Original artist | Year | Peak chart positions | | | | | | Certifications | Album |
| Title | Original artist | Year | NOR | DEN | NED | SWE | UK | US | Certifications | Album |
|---|---|---|---|---|---|---|---|---|---|---|
| "I Took a Pill in Ibiza" (Seeb Remix) | Mike Posner | 2015 | 1 | 4 | 1 | 7 | 1 | 4 | RIAA: 6× Platinum; ARIA: 3× Platinum; BEA: 2× Platinum; BPI: 4× Platinum; GLF: 3× Platinum; IFPI NOR: 3× Platinum; MC: 3× Platinum; RMNZ: 2× Platinum | At Night, Alone. |
| "Cut Me Loose" (Seeb Remix) | Kiesza | 2015 | — | — | — | — | — | — | | Non-album remixes |
| "Stitches" (Seeb Remix) | Shawn Mendes | 2015 | — | — | — | — | — | — | | Non-album remixes |
| "Moments" (Seeb Remix) | Tove Lo | 2016 | — | — | — | — | — | — | | Non-album remixes |
| "Hymn for the Weekend" (Seeb Remix) | Coldplay | 2016 | — | — | — | 50 | — | 25 | GLF 2× Platinum | Non-album remixes |
| "Kids" (Seeb Remix) | OneRepublic | 2016 | — | — | — | — | — | — | | Non-album remixes |
| "Waterfall" (Seeb Remix) | Stargate (featuring P!NK and Sia) | 2017 | — | — | — | — | — | — | | Non-album remixes |
| "Castle on the Hill" (Seeb Remix) | Ed Sheeran | 2017 | — | — | — | — | — | — | | Non-album remixes |
| "Return of the Mack" (Seeb Remix) | Mark Morrison | 2017 | — | — | — | — | — | — | | Non-album remixes |
| "2U" (Seeb Remix) | David Guetta (featuring Justin Bieber) | 2017 | — | — | — | — | — | — | | Non-album remixes |
| "Gotta Get a Grip" (Seeb Remix) | Mick Jagger | 2017 | — | — | — | — | — | — | | Non-album remixes |
| "Delicate" (Seeb Remix) | Taylor Swift | 2018 | 27 | — | — | — | — | — | | Non-album remixes |
| "Solo" (Seeb Remix) | Clean Bandit (featuring Demi Lovato) | 2018 | — | — | — | — | — | — | | Non-album remixes |
| "Easier" (Seeb Remix) | 5 Seconds Of Summer | 2019 | — | — | — | — | — | — | | Non-album remixes |
| "Hallucinogenics" (Seeb Remix) | Matt Maeson | 2020 | — | — | — | — | — | — | | Non-album remixes |
"—" denotes a recording that did not chart or was not released in that territory.
