= Dagny discography =

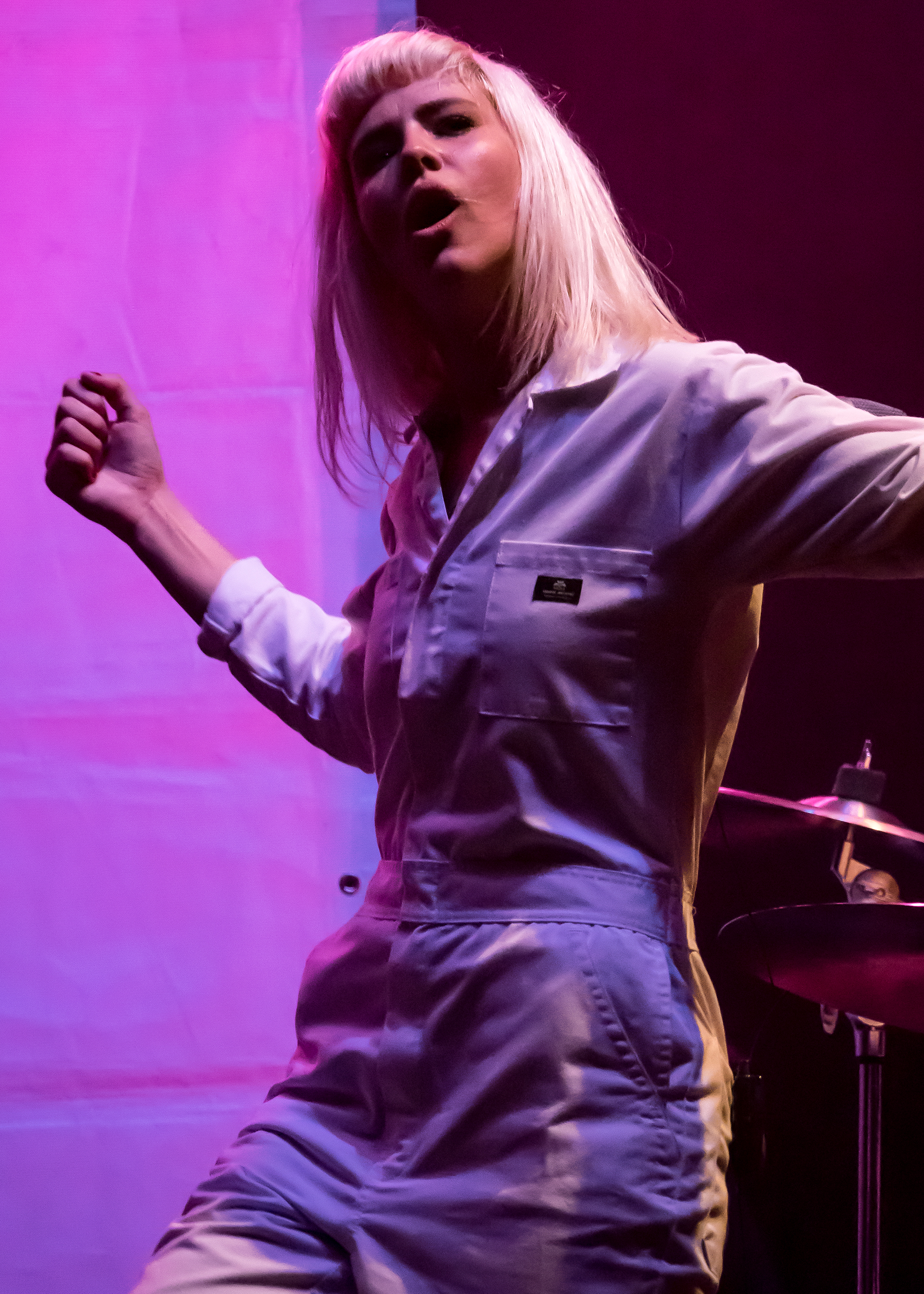
- Dagny performing in 2017
- Studio albums: 3
- EPs: 4
- Singles: 30
- Music videos: 15

Norwegian singer-songwriter Dagny has released three studio albums, four extended play, 30 singles (including eight as featured artist), one promotional singles and 15 music videos. Dagny started her career as the lead singer in 2010, she signed a publishing deal with Cold Paris Record to release her debut extended play Things We Never Say. The next year Dagny release "Run River Run" with Norwegian rock brand Vishu in 2011. Two years later during her tour a second extended play The Living Room Tour Summer 2013 released as promotion CD under Far South Music LTD, in extremely limited quantity.

After five years of break in 2016, she came back to music and started to release music using only her name as the pseudonym. In the same year Dagny released her new single "Backbeat". In July that year, Dagny released her follow-up single "Fool's Gold". Both of these tracks were included on her third extended play Ultraviolet which was released in September 2016. It was Dagny's first extended play to be released internationally in nearly six years to following her debut extended play.

In 2017, she released two stand-alone singles "Wearing Nothing" and "Love You Like That" with the latter peaking at 38 in the country becoming her first entry on the list. She released another set of stand-alone singles in 2018, "That Feeling When" and "Used to You". These tracks were followed by the release of "Hit Your Heart".

"Come Over" was released as the lead single from her debut album on 7 February 2020. "Somebody" was released on May 1 that year as the album's second single. It peaked at 3 on Norway becoming her highest charting track on the Norway list to date. Dagny released the first part of her debut album Strangers / Lovers in May 2020 and the second part in October 2020.

Dagny released "Heartbreak in the Making" in April 2023. The song peaked at number 19 on the Norwegian singles chart. This was followed by the release of "Same Again (For Love)" in June 2023. "Ray-Bans" was released in September 2023. "Strawberry Dream" was released in April 2024. All of these tracks are part of her second studio album Elle, which was released on 7 June 2024.

== Studio albums ==
Title	Details	Peak chart positions	Certifications
Title	Details	NOR	Certifications
Strangers / Lovers	Released: 2 October 2020; Label: Little Daggers, Universal Music; Format: Digital download, streaming, vinyl	2	IFPI NOR: 2× Platinum
Elle	Released: 7 June 2024; Label: Little Daggers, Universal Music; Format: Digital download, streaming, vinyl	8	
Dancefloor Erotica	Released: 12 June 2026; Label: Little Daggers; Format: Digital download, streaming, CD, vinyl	46	

== Extended plays ==
Title	Details
Thing We Never Say (Note: as "Dagny Norvoll Sandvik", Thing We Never Say was count as Single in Spotify but change to extended play later, some reason it was removed from all streaming service.)	Released: 10 August 2010; Label: Clod Paris Records; Format: Digital download, streaming
The Living Room Tour Summer 2013	Released: 1 January 2013; Label: Far South Music LTD; Format: CD
Ultraviolet	Released: 2 September 2016; Label: Republic; Format: Digital download, streaming, CD (Demo)
Jupiter	Released: 14 November 2025; Label: Little Daggers; Format: Digital download, streaming

== Singles ==
=== As lead artist ===
Title	Year	Peak chart positions		Certifications	Album
Title	Year	NOR	NOR Air.	Certifications	Album
"Run River Run" (with Vishnu)	2011	—	—		Non-album singles
"I Say"	2014	—	—		The Living Room Tour Summer 2013
"Backbeat"	2016	—	—	IFPI NOR: Gold	Ultraviolet
"Fool's Gold" (featuring Børns)	2016	—	—	IFPI NOR: Gold	Ultraviolet
"Wearing Nothing"	2017	—	—	IFPI NOR: Platinum	Non-album singles
"More More More"	2017	—	—		Non-album singles
"Love You Like That"	2017	38	—	IFPI NOR: Platinum	Non-album singles
"That Feeling When"	2018	—	—		Non-album singles
"Used to You"	2018	—	—		Non-album singles
"Landslide"	2018	—	—		Non-album singles
"Hit Your Heart" (with Steve Aoki)	2019	34	—		Non-album singles
"Come Over"	2020	35	—	IFPI NOR: Platinum	Strangers / Lovers
"Somebody"	2020	3	1	IFPI NOR: 3× Platinum	Strangers / Lovers
"It's Only a Heartbreak"	2020	—	—		Strangers / Lovers
"Pretty" (with Astrid S)	2021	10	—		The Hating Game
"Brightsider"	2022	23	—		Non-album singles
"Highs & Lows"	2022	38	—		Non-album singles
"Heartbreak in the Making"	2023	19	4		Elle
"Same Again (For Love)"	2023	25	7		Elle
"Ray-Bans"	2023	39	—		Elle
"Strawberry Dream"	2024	38	29		Elle
"Dancefloor Erotica"	2026	—	—		Dancefloor Erotica
"Closet Disco Queen"	2026	—	—		Dancefloor Erotica
"Rain"	2026	—	—		Dancefloor Erotica
"C'est La Vie"	2026	27	13		Dancefloor Erotica
"—" denotes singles that did not chart or were not released.

=== As featured artist ===
Title	Year	Peak chart positions		Album/EP
Title	Year	NOR	SWE	Album/EP
"Man in the Moon" (LCAW featuring Dagny)	2017	—	—	Non-album singles
"Summer of Love" (NOTD featuring Dagny)	2017	—	—	Non-album singles
"Drink About" (Seeb featuring Dagny)	2018	2	25	Nice to Meet You and Sad in Scandinavia
"Turn" (The Wombats featuring Dagny)	2018	—	—	Non-album single
"Anyone Else" (Matilda featuring Dagny)	2020	—	—	Retrospect
"Bad" (Rat City featuring Dagny)	2021	—	—	Non-album single
"Something Beautiful" (JUNG featuring Dagny)	2024	—	—	The Kids are Still Awake
"Something Like This" (Skaar featuring Dagny)	2024	—	—	Mad Women
"—" denotes singles that did not chart or were not released.

=== Promotional singles ===
List of promotional singles, with selected chart positions, showing year released and album name
Title	Year	Peak chart positions	Album/EP
Title	Year	UK	Album/EP
"Hold On Lucy" (Note: "Hold On Lucy" released in 6 June 2014 on Soundcloud and YouTube, This single was removed from all streaming service.)	2014	—	The Living Room Tour Summer 2013
"—" denotes a recording that did not chart in that territory.

== Guest appearances ==
List of non-single guest appearances, with other performing artists, showing year released and album name
Title	Year	Album
"My Command" (Kohib featuring Dagny)	2010	Make Fi
"So Good" (Kohib featuring Dagny)	2012	Solar Day
"You’re Not Fooling Anyone" (Jonas Alaska featuring Dagny)	2021	Girl
"Lonely Together" (Kygo featuring Dagny)	2022	Thrill of the Chase

== Music videos ==
List of music videos, showing year released, title, directors and type
Year	Title	Director	Type
2014	"I Say"	Unknown	Official Video
2016	"Backbeat"	Malia James	Official Video
2017	"Wearing Nothing	Tabitha Denholm	Official Video
2017	"Summer Of Love" (NOTD featuring Dagny)	HenkeGuztav	Official Video
2018	"That Feeling When"	Jørgen Nordby	Official Video
2020	"Come Over"	Tusk	Official Video
2020	"Somebody"	Tusk	Official Video
2020	"It's Only A Heartbreak"	Bjørg & Doris	Official Video
2021	"Pretty" (with Astrid S)	Fred Jonny	Lyric Video
2022	"Brightsider"	Nicolai Gundorff Asmussen	Lyric Video
2022	"Highs & Lows"	Kristoffer Grindheim	Official Video
2023	"Heartbreak In The Making"	Leo Kramer	Lyric Video
2024	"Something Beautiful" (JUNG featuring Dagny)	Tom Ljungqvist	Official Video
2024	"Strawberry Dream"	Håkon Grønn Paulsen	Lyric Video
2024	"Hate Being Alone"	Sigurd Fossen	Official Video
