= Bye Bye Baby =

Bye Bye Baby may refer to:

== Songs ==
- "Bye Bye Baby", a song from the 1949 Broadway musical Gentlemen Prefer Blondes
- "Bye Bye Baby", a song written by American Frank McNulty and sung by Australian Col Joye in 1959
- "Bye Bye Baby" (Mary Wells song), 1960 debut single by Motown singer Mary Wells
  - Bye Bye Baby I Don't Want to Take a Chance, her 1961 album
- "Bye, Bye, Baby (Baby Goodbye)", a 1965 song performed by The Four Seasons and later covered by the Bay City Rollers
- "Bye, Bye Baby", from the eponymous 1966 Big Brother and the Holding Company (album), featuring Janis Joplin
- "Bye Bye Baby", a song from the 1978 Pain Killer
- "Bye Bye Baby", a song written by Joey Ramone for the 1987 Ramones album Halfway to Sanity and later covered by Ronnie Spector
- "Bye Bye Baby", a song by Social Distortion from their 1992 album Somewhere Between Heaven and Hell
- "Bye Bye Baby" (Madonna song), a song from 1992 album Erotica
- "Bye Bye Baby" (CatCat song), 1994 Finnish Eurovision Song Contest entry
- "Bye Bye Baby", a song by G. Love & Special Sauce from the 1995 album Coast to Coast Motel
- "Bye Bye Baby", a song by TQ from the 1998 album They Never Saw Me Coming
- "Bye Bye Baby", a song by OK Go from the 2002 OK Go
- "Bye Bye Baby", a song by Saves the Day from the 2007 album Under the Boards
- "Bye Bye Baby", a song by Noname from the 2016 mixtape Telefone
- "Bye Bye Baby", a song by Kanye West originally meant to appear on Yandhi, the album that became Jesus Is King (2019)
- "Bye Bye Baby", a song by Dagny from the 2020 album Strangers / Lovers
- "Bye Bye Baby", a previously unreleased song by Taylor Swift from the 2021 album Fearless (Taylor's Version)

== Other uses ==
- Bye Bye Baby (film), a 1989 film starring Brigitte Nielsen and Carol Alt
- "Bye Bye Baby" (The Brittas Empire), a 1991 television episode
- "Bye-Bye, Baby!", signature home run call of Russ Hodges of the San Francisco Giants baseball team

== See also ==
- Buy Buy Baby, American chain of stores for young children, established in 1996
- "Buy, Buy Baby", episode of the American television series Will & Grace in 2006
- "Goodbye Priscilla (Bye Bye Baby Blue)", 1977 single by Gene Summers
- "Baby Baby Bye Bye", 1960 song by Jerry Lee Lewis
- "Baby Bye Bye", 1984 song by Gary Morris
