= Your Sister =

Your Sister may refer to:

- "Your Sister", a 1998 song by TQ featuring Too Short from They Never Saw Me Coming
- "Your Sister", a 2007 song by Sean Kingston from Sean Kingston

== See also ==
- Sister
