= If U Were My Man =

Single by Sarah Connor

from the album Green Eyed Soul
- Released: 8 July 2002
- Genre: Pop, R&B
- Length: 3:38
- Label: X-Cell
- Songwriter(s): Troy Samson, Bülent Aris
- Producer(s): Bülent Aris

Sarah Connor singles chronology
"From Sarah with Love" (2001)	"If U Were My Man" (2002)	"One Nite Stand (Of Wolves and Sheep)" (2002)

"If U Were My Man" is a song by German singer–songwriter Sarah Connor from her debut album, Green Eyed Soul (2001). It was the only single not released in Connor's native Germany.

"If U Were My Man" was originally set to be the first single from Green Eyed Soul, but "Let's Get Back to Bed - Boy!" was chosen instead. It was one of the first songs Connor recorded to shop to major labels and created quite a bit of buzz around her.

The song was released as the album's fourth and final single on 8 July 2002, and did not manage to chart noticeably. A promo was made for Polish release though it apparently never occurred. Rumors that "If U Were My Man" would be released in Germany and the rest of Europe were eventually proven false once Connor decided to embark on her first tour instead.

== Track listings and formats ==
European CD single

1. "If U Were My Man" (Pop Version) – 3:39
2. "If U Were My Man" (Album Version) – 3:38

Unreleased Polish promo CD single

1. "If U Were My Man"
