= The Second Coming (TQ album) =

Studio album by TQ
- Released: May 20, 2000 (UK)
- Recorded: 1999–2000
- Genre: R&B
- Label: Epic
- Producer: TQ (executive producer), Livin Proof

TQ chronology
They Never Saw Me Coming (1999)	The Second Coming (2000)	Listen (2004)

Professional ratings
Review scores
Source	Rating
The Encyclopedia of Popular Music	3/5 stars
Vibe	2.5/5 stars

The Second Coming is the second album by R&B singer TQ. It was released in 2000 in the United Kingdom; plans for a United States release were cancelled.

Mistakes appear across various releases: the song "One Day" is listed as featuring Bone Thugs-n-Harmony member Layzie Bone—whose name is incorrectly spelled "Lazy Bone"—in the Europe-only official releases; however, the track in question actually features West Coast rapper E-40. Ironically, the never-released American version did indeed feature Layzie Bone.

The album peaked at No. 32 on the UK Albums Chart.

== Critical reception ==
The Birmingham Evening Mail called the single "Daily" "witty," and asked "Who says today's soul can't be commercial and fun?"

== Track listings ==
=== UK/Europe track listing ===
No.	Title	Length
1.	"Come Again" (Interlude)	1:54
2.	"G.H.E.T.T.O."	3:29
3.	"Internationally Yours" (feat The Homies)	4:30
4.	"Daily"	4:34
5.	"Superbitches"	3:44
6.	"Caught" (Interlude)	0:27
7.	"How Can I Be Down" (feat Ja Rule)	3:33
8.	"Hold It Down" (feat Vandalz)	3:39
9.	"What the F***"	0:35
10.	"Best Friend"	3:41
11.	"One Day" (featuring Layzie Bone)	3:52
12.	"Mama" (Interlude)	0:52
13.	"Lite-Skinned Freckle Face" (feat P-Nut)	4:16
14.	"The Grind" (feat Warren G)	3:31
15.	"The One"	4:16
16.	"Been a Long Time"	4:12
17.	"Ooh La La" (Bonus Track)	4:08

=== Germany and Netherlands track listing ===
No.	Title	Length
1.	"Come Again" (Interlude)	1:54
2.	"G.H.E.T.T.O."	3:29
3.	"Internationally Yours" (feat The Homies)	4:30
4.	"Daily"	4:34
5.	"Superbitches"	3:44
6.	"Caught" (Interlude)	0:27
7.	"How Can I Be Down" (feat Ja Rule)	3:33
8.	"Hold It Down" (feat Vandalz)	3:39
9.	"What the F***"	0:35
10.	"Best Friend"	3:41
11.	"One Day" (featuring Layzie Bone)	3:52
12.	"Mama" (Interlude)	0:52
13.	"Lite-Skinned Freckle Face" (feat P-Nut)	4:16
14.	"Hard Life" (feat E-40 and The GiGi's)	4:03
15.	"The Grind" (feat Warren G)	3:31
16.	"The One"	4:16
17.	"Been a Long Time"	4:12
18.	"Ooh La La" (Bonus Track)	4:08

=== Unreleased USA Track listing ===
No.	Title	Length
1.	"Come Again" (Interlude)	1:54
2.	"G.H.E.T.T.O."	3:29
3.	"Daily"	4:34
4.	"Superbitches"	3:44
5.	"Anna Maria"	2:48
6.	"How Can I Be Down" (feat Ja Rule)	3:33
7.	"Hold It Down" (feat Vandalz)	3:39
8.	"What the F***"	0:35
9.	"Best Friend"	3:41
10.	"One Day" (featuring Layzie Bone)	3:58
11.	"Mama" (Interlude)	0:52
12.	"Lite-Skinned Freckle Face" (feat P-Nut)	4:16
13.	"Hard Life" (feat E-40 and The GiGi's)	4:03
14.	"The Grind" (feat Warren G)	3:31
15.	"Down Bottom" (Interlude)	0:58
16.	"Dirty Home" (feat Baby)	4:43
17.	"The One"	4:16
18.	"Been a Long Time"	4:12
