= Paradise (TQ album) =

Studio album by TQ
- Released: April 29, 2008
- Genre: R&B
- Label: EMI, Gracie Productions
- Producer: TQ (executive producer); Static Major; Deezle; Nigel Payne; Crak; DJ Tomekk

TQ chronology
Gemini (2007)	Paradise (2008)	S.E.X.Y. (2009)

Professional ratings
Review scores
Source	Rating
DJBooth.net	3.5/5 stars

Paradise is the fifth album by TQ originally scheduled for release in 2007, but with many delays, was pushed back and finally released on April 29, 2008.

== Track listing ==
No.	Title	Producer(s)	Length
1.	"Paradise" (featuring Krayzie Bone)	Static Major	4:56
2.	"Soulja"	Deezle	5:12
3.	"In My Lap"	Deezle	3:50
4.	"Sexy"	TQ	4:23
5.	"Whatchagondo?"	Nigel Payne	3:49
6.	"Proud Mary"	Deezle	4:20
7.	"Ain't the Same"	Crak and TQ	3:46
8.	"Pumpin'" (featuring Cadillac and Low)	TQ	5:09
9.	"Ebony Eyes"	DJ Tomekk	3:41
10.	"I Don't Know" (featuring Jagged Edge)	Brian & Brandon Casey	3:16
11.	"A Little Bit of Love"	TQ	4:36
12.	"Paradise (Remix)" (featuring B.G.)	Deezle	4:18

== Credits ==
- All Guitars by Ricky Rouse.
- All Drums by Trevor Lawrence.
- Additional Programming by Terrance Quaites
- Executive Producer: Dorian (Lil D) Washington And Tony Bucher for Gracie Production
- Co-Executive Producer : Terrance (TQ) Quaites & Theresa Price
- A&R Dorian (Lil D) Washington
