= Nice to Meet You (Seeb EP) =

EP by Seeb
- Released: 20 April 2018
- Recorded: 2017–18
- Length: 18:42
- Label: Island; Universal Norway
- Producer: Seeb; Kid Joki; Jeremy Skaller; Cory Enemy; Rice n Peas; LIT3S

Seeb chronology
Intro to Seeb (2016)	Nice to Meet You (2018)	Sad in Scandinavia (Part 1) (2020)

Singles from Nice to Meet You
- 1. "Drink About" Released: April 6, 2018

Nice to Meet You is the second extended play (EP) by Norwegian electronic dance music band Seeb. It was released on 20 April 2018, and features musicians Skylar Grey, Jay Sean, and Iselin. The first single, "Drink About", was released on 6 April 2018 and featured singer Dagny.

== Track listing ==
No.	Title	Writer(s)	Producer(s)	Length
1.	"Say You Love Me" (featuring Skylar Grey)	Simen Eriksrud; Espen Berg; Joakim Haukaas; Jason Evigan; Magnus August Hoiberg; Holly Hafermann	SeeB; Kid Joki	3:02
2.	"Don't Know Why" (featuring Jay Sean)	Eriksrud; Berg; Marty James; Michael Woods; Kevin White; Jeremy Skaller; Cory Enemy; Kamaljit Jhooti	SeeB; Skaller^{[b]}; Enemy^{[b]}; Rice N Peas^{[b]}	3:10
3.	"Nice to Meet You" (featuring Goodito Frito)	Eriksrud; Berg; Haukaas; Brian Kennedy; Samuel Hook; Rob Persaud	SeeB; Kid Joki	3:02
4.	"Drink About" (featuring Dagny)	Eriksrud; Berg; Haukaas; Alexandra Robotham; Sarah Aarons; Thomas Hull	SeeB; Kid Joki	3:02
5.	"The High" (featuring 11 LIT3S)	Eriksrud; Berg; Tiago Carvalho; Charlie Hooper	SeeB; LIT3S	3:23
6.	"Listen" (featuring Iselin)	Eriksrud; Berg; Andreas Sjo Engen; Jesper Borgen; Iselin Solheim; Fredrik Borgen	SeeB	3:03

== Personnel ==
- Simen Eriksrud, Espen Berg – sampling, programming

== Charts ==
Chart (2018)	Peak position
Finnish Albums (Suomen virallinen lista)	41
Swedish Albums (Sverigetopplistan)	44
