= Westside (TQ song) =

Single by TQ

from the album They Never Saw Me Coming
- Released: September 1, 1998
- Recorded: 1998
- Genre: R&B
- Length: 5:04
- Label: Epic
- Songwriter: Donald Custis
- Producers: Femi Ojetunde, Mike Mosley, TQ

TQ singles chronology
"Westside" (1998)	"Better Days" (1999)

"Westside" is the debut single by TQ, from his 1998 debut album, They Never Saw Me Coming. The song was produced by Bay-area producers Femi Ojetunde and Mike Mosley, with TQ serving as co-producer. The song is an anthemic ode to TQ's native California. In the song's lyrics, he mentions several other California musicians who influenced him; Ice Cube, Eazy-E, Ice-T, Too Short and DJ Quik. At the end of "Westside", TQ dedicates the song to the deceased Eazy-E and Tupac Shakur.

Released late in 1998, "Westside" became a breakthrough hit for TQ, reaching No. 12 on the Billboard Hot 100 in the United States, while also becoming a top 10 hit in several other countries, including the United Kingdom (No. 4), Ireland (No. 5) and the Netherlands (No. 3). In the US, "Westside" was certified gold by the RIAA for sales of 500,000 copies on October 22, 1998. The song also took the final spot on the Billboard Year-End Hot 100 singles of 1998.

== Single track listing ==
1. "Westside" (Album Version)- 5:02
2. "Westside" (Radio Version)- 3:52
3. "Bye Bye Baby" (Snippet)- 1:12
4. "Westside" (Instrumental Version)- 5:07
5. "Bye Bye Baby (Snippet)"- 1:12

== Westside Part II / Westside Part III (single) ==
1. "Westside Part II (My Melody)" (feat. DJ Quik, Hi-C, James DeBarge, Playa Hamm & Suga Free (Clean Version) - 4:42
2. "Westside Part II (My Melody)" (feat. DJ Quik, Hi-C, James DeBarge, Playa Hamm & Suga Free (Dirty Version) - 4:42
3. "Westside Part II (My Melody)" (Instrumental) - 4:42
4. "Westside Part III (Bud'da Remix)" (feat. Jayo Felony & Kam (Clean Version) - 4:04
5. "Westside Part III (Bud'da Remix)" (feat. Jayo Felony & Kam (Dirty Version) - 4:04
6. "Westside Part II (Bud'da Remix)" (Instrumental) - 4:04

== Charts and certifications ==
=== Weekly charts ===
Chart (1998–1999)	Peak position
Australia (ARIA)	10
Austria (Ö3 Austria Top 40)	29
Belgium (Ultratop 50 Flanders)	9
Canada (Nielsen SoundScan)	10
Europe (European Hot 100 Singles)	10
France (SNEP)	59
Germany (GfK)	8
Ireland (IRMA)	4
Netherlands (Dutch Top 40)	4
Netherlands (Single Top 100)	3
New Zealand (Recorded Music NZ)	10
Norway (VG-lista)	8
Scotland Singles (OCC)	17
Sweden (Sverigetopplistan)	9
Switzerland (Schweizer Hitparade)	14
UK Singles (OCC)	4
UK Hip Hop/R&B (OCC)	1
US Billboard Hot 100	12
US Hot R&B/Hip-Hop Songs (Billboard)	10
US Rhythmic Airplay (Billboard)	7

=== Year-end charts ===
Chart (1998)	Position
Australia (ARIA)	76
Belgium (Ultratop Flanders)	73
Germany (Official German Charts)	60
Netherlands (Dutch Top 40)	41
Netherlands (Single Top 100)	37
Sweden (Sverigetopplistan)	84
US Billboard Hot 100	100

=== Certifications ===
Certifications and sales for "Westside"
Region	Certification	Certified units/sales
Australia (ARIA)	Gold	35,000^{^}
United States (RIAA)	Gold	500,000
^{^} Shipments figures based on certification alone.
