= Green Eyed Soul =

Studio album by Sarah Connor
- Released: 26 November 2001
- Genres: Pop; Pop-soul
- Length: 66:41
- Label: X-Cell
- Producers: Mekong Age; Bülent Aris; Adam Charon; Kay D.; Rufi-Oh; Terrance Quaites; Rob Tyger

Sarah Connor chronology
Green Eyed Soul (2001)	Unbelievable (2002)

Singles from Green Eyed Soul
- 1. "Let's Get Back to Bed – Boy!" Released: May 7, 2001; 2. "French Kissing" Released: August 20, 2001; 3. "From Sarah with Love" Released: November 5, 2001

Green Eyed Soul is the debut album by German recording artist Sarah Connor. It was released by X-Cell Records on November 26, 2001 in German-speaking Europe.

Connor worked on the majority of the album with Bülent Aris and duo Rob Tyger and Kay Denar, all of which would become frequent collaborators on subsequent projects released by Connor. A frequent collaborator on the album was singer TQ as well as producers Adam Charon, Mekong Age, and Rufi-Oh. Green Eyed Soul is predominantly a pop album with major influences of contemporary R&B, hip hop and soul music. The album's lyrics explore the complexities of romantic relationships and stages of love.

Green Eyed Soul received a generally mixed reception from professional music critics, who declared it a mixed bag but considered it a solid career launcher. Upon its release, it charted at number two on the German Albums Chart, and within the top five in Austria, Finland and Switzerland.

Ranking among Connor's biggest-selling international efforts, the album eventually reached gold status in Austria, the Czech Republic, Poland, Portugal and Switzerland and was certified platinum by the Musiikkituottajat (IFPI Finland) and triple gold by the Bundesverband Musikindustrie (BVMI).

== Release and promotion ==
Green Eyed Soul spawned three singles, including "Let's Get Back to Bed – Boy!", "French Kissing" and the ballad "From Sarah with Love".

The lead single, "Let's Get Back to Bed – Boy!", was released on 7 May 2001. The song was met with commercial success, reaching the top-20 in 7 countries, including the United Kingdom, where it remains as one of her two top-20 songs. The song features American singer TQ, whom raps on the track.

The second single that was released from the album was "French Kissing", which was based on a sample of Blackstreet's "No Diggity". Although the song reached number 18 in Austria, it did not meet the success of the former single. However, Connor's first number-one hit in Germany, was the third single from the album, "From Sarah with Love". The song is considered to be her breakthrough song.

A fourth track, "If U Were My Man", received a limited promotional release in Eastern Europe, but failed to chart anywhere.

In support of the album, Connor embarked on the Green Eyed Soul Tour in 2002; while it was initially scheduled to begin in April that year, it was rescheduled to June. Connor said in an interview with music publication Music & Media that the tour was "what she lived for."

== Critical reception ==
Professional ratings
Review scores
Source	Rating
laut.de	2/5 stars

Upon its release, Green Eyed Soul received a generally mixed reception from professional music critics, who declared it a mixed bag but considered it a solid career launcher. Michael Frömmer from laut.de noted Connor "can sing soul, but unfortunately it does so far too rarely on Green Eyed Soul. Once [she] has found her musical path, if she tries not to sing like Mariah Carey and writes lyrics that come from deep within her, then she can really become a great pop diva."

== Chart performance ==
The album debuted at number three on the German Albums Chart in the week of 10 December 2001 and eventually peaked at number two the following week. It became the 28th biggest-selling album of the year in Germany and was eventually certified 3× Gold by the Bundesverband Musikindustrie (BVMI). By February 2002, the album had sold more than 500,000 copies in the GSA region. Green Eyed Soul also peaked within the top five in Austria, Finland and Switzerland. Ranking among Connor's biggest-selling international efforts, it also reached Gold status in Austria, the Czech Republic, Poland, Portugal and Switzerland and was certified Platinum by the Musiikkituottajat (IFPI Finland).

== Track listing ==
Green Eyed Soul track listing
No.	Title	Writer(s)	Producer(s)	Length
1.	"Let's Get Back to Bed – Boy!" (featuring TQ)	Rob Tyger; Kay Denar; Terrance Quaites	Tyger; Kay D.	3:56
2.	"If U Were My Man"	Troy Samson; Bülent Aris	Aris	3:38
3.	"French Kissing"	Tyger; Denar	Tyger; Kay D.	3:35
4.	"Magic Ride (Whatever U Wish 4)" (featuring TQ)	Eddie Martin; Kenny Yeomans; Quaites	Aris	4:29
5.	"From Sarah with Love"	Tyger; Denar; Sarah Connor	Tyger; Kay D.	5:08
6.	"Make U High"	Tyger; Denar; Connor	Tyger; Kay D.	3:33
7.	"In My House"	Rick James	Adam Charon; Mekong Age; Rufi-Oh	3:13
8.	"Where Do We Go from Here"	Charon; Age; Rufi-Oh	Charon; Age; Rufi-Oh	3:55
9.	"I Can't Lie"	Martin; Yeomans	Aris	3:42
10.	"Imagining"	Martin; Yeomans	Aris	5:32
11.	"Every Little Thing"	Nosie Katzmann; Aris; Daniel Troha	Aris	3:37
12.	"Undressed"	Tyger; Denar	Tyger; Kay D.	3:38
13.	"Can't Get None"	Quaites	TQ; Jamahl Harris^{[A]}; Charon^{[B]}; Age^{[B]}; Rufi-Oh^{[B]}	3:58
14.	"Man of My Dreams"	Aris; Chris Tonino; Michael Eirich	Aris	3:11
15.	"Let Us Come 2gether"	Tyger; Denar	Tyger; Kay D.	3:53
16.	"When I Dream"	Charon; Age; Rufi-Oh; Connor	Charon; Age; Rufi-Oh	3:29
17.	"Let's Get Back to Bed – Boy! (Gena B. Good-Remix)" (featuring TQ)	Tyger; Denar; Quaites	Tyger; Kay D.; Gena B. Good^{[B]}	3:56
Total length:				66:41

=== Notes ===
- ^{^[A]} denotes co-producer
- ^{^[b]} denotes additional producer

=== Sample credits ===
- "French Kissing" contains a sample from "No Diggity", originally recorded by Blackstreet.
- "In My House" is a cover version of the 1984 same-titled song by the Mary Jane Girls.

== Charts ==
=== Weekly charts ===
Weekly chart performance for Green Eyed Soul
Chart (2001-2002)	Peak position
Austrian Albums (Ö3 Austria)	4
German Albums (Offizielle Top 100)	2
Swiss Albums (Schweizer Hitparade)	3
Belgian Albums (Ultratop Flanders)	41
Belgian Albums (Ultratop Wallonia)	44
Dutch Albums (Album Top 100)	28
Finnish Albums (Suomen virallinen lista)	4
Greek Albums (IFPI)	31
Hungarian Albums (MAHASZ)	33
Norwegian Albums (VG-lista)	17

=== Year-end charts ===
Year-end chart performance for Green Eyed Soul
Chart (2002)	Position
Austrian Albums (Ö3 Austria)	19
German Albums (Official Top 100)	28
Swiss Albums (Schweizer Hitparade)	36

== Certifications ==
Certifications for Green Eyed Soul
Region	Certification	Certified units/sales
Austria (IFPI Austria)	Gold	20,000^{*}
Czech (ČNS IFPI)	Gold	
Finland (Musiikkituottajat)	Platinum	31,320
Germany (BVMI)	3× Gold	450,000^{^}
Poland (ZPAV)	Gold	
Portugal (AFP)	Gold	20,000^{^}
Switzerland (IFPI Switzerland)	Gold	20,000^{^}
^{*} Sales figures based on certification alone.^{^} Shipments figures based on certification alone.
