= Under Your Skin (song) =

Single by Seeb and R. City
- Released: 3 March 2017
- Recorded: 2017
- Length: 3:08
- Label: Sky; Kemosabe; UMG
- Songwriters: Jamahli Timothy Thomas; Chloe Angelides; Christoffer Huse; Makiel Theron Thomas; Trond Opsahl; Espen Berg; Simen Eriksrud; Dr. Luke; Cirkut; Gamal "Lunchmoney" Lewis
- Producers: Simen Eriksrud; Espen Berg; Christoffer Huse; Trond Opsahl

Seeb singles chronology
"What Do You Love" (2016)	"Under Your Skin" (2017)	"Boys in the Street" (2017)

R. City singles chronology
"Bang Bang" (2016)	"Under Your Skin" (2017)

Music video
- "Under Your Skin" on YouTube

"Under Your Skin" is a song by Norwegian EDM record production trio Seeb and American musical duo Rock City. The song was written by Jamahli Timothy Thomas, Chloe Angelides, Makiel Theron Thomas, Dr. Luke, Cirkut, LunchMoney Lewis, Simen Eriksrud, Espen Berg, Christoffer Huse and Trond Opsahl, with the latter four handling the song's production. It was made available for digital download on 3 March 2017 through Sky Music, Kemosabe Records and Universal Music Group.

== Background ==
"We're so honoured to have had our new single 'Under Your Skin' chosen as the official theme song of the X Games this year and we are thrilled to be asked to perform it live on TV in front of millions of viewers this Saturday!" said Seeb. "This event showcases some of the best athletes in the world and it is so inspiring for us to have even a small part in that incredible celebration. On 11 March we hope to add to that energy and give everyone, not only in the area but also at home, a show they will not soon forget!"

Talking about how their collaboration with R. City came about in an email interview by CelebMix, Seeb said "We came in touch with R City through their label, and the first idea was only to do a remix, but it turned out so well it became a collaboration instead."

== Usage in media ==
"Under Your Skin" was selected as the official theme song for the X Games Norway 2017 in Oslo, which was televised and broadcast live in over 110 countries by ESPN. When asked about their reaction in the interview aforementioned, Seeb said "We were so happy, X Games is huge, and this was a great way for us to show the world our new single."

== Critical reception ==
Music News Desk from BroadWayWorld said: "The upbeat vocals, soft synth melodies, and thumping bass-line come together to make a track which is perfect for festival season." bigFM wrote: "With 'Under Your Skin', the trio remains true to its special EDM style – but the song makes even more of a good mood due to the vocal performance of the R'n'B duo R. City." They concluded that "'Under Your Skin' sounds fresh and makes us want the summer even more."

== Track listing ==
Digital download
No.	Title	Length
1.	"Under Your Skin"	3:08

== Charts ==
Chart (2017)	Peak position
Norway (VG-lista)	30
