= From Sarah with Love =

2001 single by Sarah Connor

Single by Sarah Connor

from the album Green Eyed Soul
- B-side: "Man of My Dreams"
- Released: 5 November 2001
- Genre: Pop
- Length: 5:08
- Label: X-Cell; Epic
- Songwriters: Rob Tyger; Kay Denar; Sarah Connor
- Producers: Rob Tyger; Kay D.

Sarah Connor singles chronology
"French Kissing" (2001)	"From Sarah with Love" (2001)	"If U Were My Man" (2001)

"From Sarah with Love" is a song by German recording artist Sarah Connor. It was co-written and produced by Rob Tyger and Kay Denar and Connor for her debut studio album, Green Eyed Soul (2001). The title of the song is inspired by the James Bond movie From Russia with Love. Released as the album's third single on 5 November 2001, it peaked at number one in the Czech Republic, Germany, Portugal and Switzerland and reached the top three in Austria, Finland, Hungary and Romania. "From Sarah with Love" was nominated for Best National (i.e. German) Single – Rock/Pop at the 2002 ECHO Awards and received a triple gold certification from the Bundesverband Musikindustrie (BVMI).

== Background ==
"From Sarah with Love" was written by Connor along with frequent collaborators, Rob Tyger and Kay Denar, for her debut studio album, Green Eyed Soul (2001). A pop ballad, the song is about an "unfulfilled love story." According to Connor, "From Sarah with Love" is written in such a way that it allows for different views. Thus, its lyrics can refer to other themes such as "heartbreak, longing, farewell."

== Chart performance ==
"From Sarah with Love" was released by X-Cell Records on 5 November 2001 as the third single from Connor's debut album Green Eyed Soul (2001). It initially debuted at number four on the German Singles Chart in the week of 19 November 2001, before rising to the top spot the following week. Connor's first single to reach number one, it would spend two further weeks atop the chart. In 2002, it was awarded 3× Gold by the Bundesverband Musikindustrie (BVMI) for shipments figures of more than 750,000 copies. GfK ranked it 23rd on both its 2001 and its 2002 year-end single chart, respectively. Elsewhere, "From Sarah with Love" reached number-one in the Czech Republic, Portugal, and Switzerland. It also became a top ten hit on most other charts it appeared on.

== Music video ==
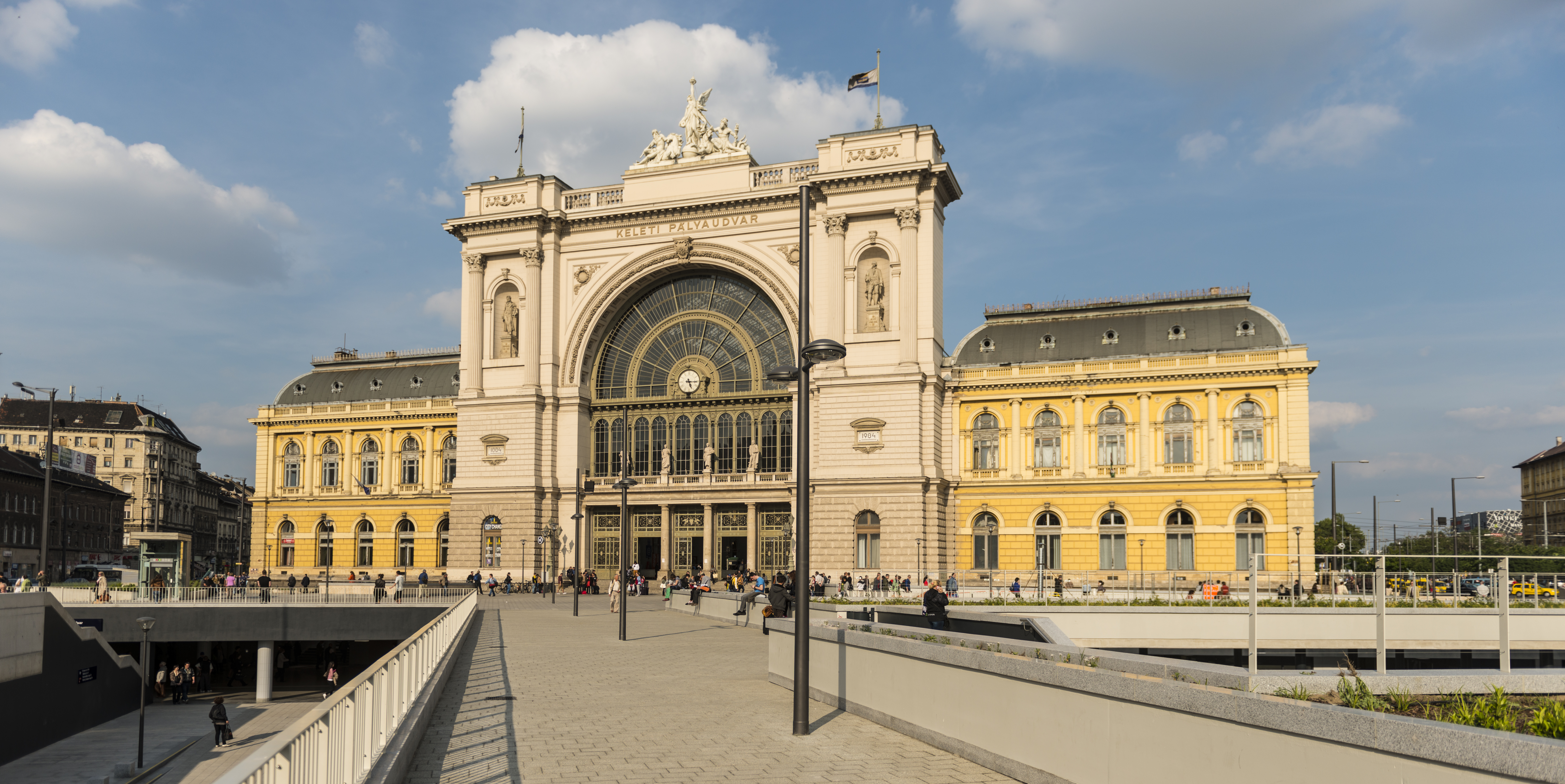
Budapest Keleti station served as the main filming location for "From Sarah with Love."

A music video for "From Sarah with Love" was directed by Daniel Lwowski and Frank Wilde. It was filmed on 11 October 2001 at Budapest Keleti station. Partially set in the 1950s to 1960s, Wilde noted that Josef von Sternberg's American pre-Code film Shanghai Express (1932) served as an inspiration for the video, particularly several scenes in which actress Marlene Dietrich is depicted. According to Lwowski, Keleti station was selected as the video's main filming location not only due to budget concerns but also due to its architecture. In the clip, Connor returns to a place from her childhood. Connor's sister, singer Sophia-Luisa "Lulu" Lewe, portrays a younger version of the singer.

== Track listings ==
CD single
No.	Title	Writer(s)	Producer(s)	Length
1.	"From Sarah with Love" (radio version)	Sarah Connor; Rob Tyger; Kay Denar	Tyger; Kay D.	4:12
2.	"From Sarah with Love" (Kayrob dance mix)	Sarah Connor; Rob Tyger; Kay Denar	Tyger; Kay D.	4:02

CD maxi single
No.	Title	Writer(s)	Producer(s)	Length
1.	"From Sarah with Love" (radio version)	Sarah Connor; Rob Tyger; Kay Denar	Tyger; Kay D.	4:12
2.	"From Sarah with Love" (Kayrob dance mix)	Sarah Connor; Rob Tyger; Kay Denar	Tyger; Kay D.	4:02
3.	"Man of My Dreams"	Bülent Aris; Chris Tonino; Michael Eirich	Aris	3:11

== Charts ==
=== Weekly charts ===
Weekly chart performance for "From Sarah with Love"
Chart (2001–2002)	Peak position
Austria (Ö3 Austria Top 40)	2
Belgium (Ultratop 50 Flanders)	6
Belgium (Ultratop 50 Wallonia)	6
Czech Republic (IFPI)	1
Europe (Eurochart Hot 100)	5
Finland (Suomen virallinen lista)	3
Germany (GfK)	1
Greece (IFPI)	9
Hungary (Rádiós Top 40)	3
Hungary (Single Top 40)	3
Italy (FIMI)	35
Netherlands (Dutch Top 40)	6
Netherlands (Single Top 100)	9
Norway (VG-lista)	14
Poland Airplay (Music & Media)	4
Portugal (AFP)	1
Romania (Romanian Top 100)	2
Sweden (Sverigetopplistan)	38
Switzerland (Schweizer Hitparade)	1

=== Year-end charts ===
2001 year-end chart performance for "From Sarah with Love"
Chart (2001)	Position
Austria (Ö3 Austria Top 40)	32
Germany (Media Control)	23
Switzerland (Schweizer Hitparade)	58

2002 year-end chart performance for "From Sarah with Love"
Chart (2002)	Position
Austria (Ö3 Austria Top 40)	8
Belgium (Ultratop 50 Flanders)	24
Belgium (Ultratop 50 Wallonia)	30
Europe (Eurochart Hot 100)	35
Germany (Media Control)	23
Netherlands (Dutch Top 40)	48
Netherlands (Single Top 100)	46
Switzerland (Schweizer Hitparade)	8

=== Decade-end charts ===
Decade-end chart performance for "From Sarah with Love"
Chart (2000–2009)	Position
Austria (Ö3 Austria Top 40)	37
Germany (Media Control GfK)	74

== Certifications ==
Certifications for "From Sarah with Love"
Region	Certification	Certified units/sales
Austria (IFPI Austria)	Gold	20,000^{*}
Belgium (BRMA)	Gold	25,000^{*}
Finland (Musiikkituottajat)	Platinum	31,320
Germany (BVMI)	3× Gold	750,000^{^}
Switzerland (IFPI Switzerland)	Platinum	40,000^{^}
^{*} Sales figures based on certification alone.^{^} Shipments figures based on certification alone.
