= TQ (singer) =

American R&B singer

- Born: May 24, 1976 (age 50); Mobile, Alabama, U.S.
- Origin: Compton, California, U.S.
- Genres: R&B
- Occupations: Singer; songwriter; producer
- Instrument: Piano
- Years active: 1990–present
- Labels: Clockwork; Epic; Cash Money; HUB; Lightyear; WEA; EMI; E1
- Website: www.therealtq.com

Terrance Quaites (born May 24, 1976), known professionally by his initials TQ, is an American R&B singer. He is best known for his hit song "Westside", which became a top 40 hit in several countries in 1998.

== Career ==
=== Music ===
TQ began his music career in the early 1990s with the R&B group Coming of Age, who had a hit with the ballad "Coming Home to Love". After two album releases, Coming of Age in September 1993 and Comin' Correct in May 1995, the group went their separate ways.

The summer of 1998 saw TQ notch his first hit with "Westside". Later that year, on November 10, the album They Never Saw Me Coming was released, along with the single "Bye Bye Baby", and "Better Days", which followed the next year.

In 2000, TQ released his second album, The Second Coming. The album was never released in America but was released in other parts of the world. The UK release had a different track listing to the European release. Although the album was not released in America, the American version yet again had a different track listing. TQ eventually digitally released bonus tracks from the album in May 2008. This included songs missing from previous versions.

He recorded a hit song, "Let's Get Back to Bed – Boy!", with the German pop singer Sarah Connor, and starred with her in a music video in which they made love.

He left Sony and joined Cash Money Records around 2002. With them, he recorded various songs with artists such as Lil Wayne, Big Tymers, Hot Boys, and Baby. He also recorded his own album, Gemini, but it was never officially released. TQ released this himself via digital means on June 16, 2009.

He released a new album, Listen, in 2004. In 2007, TQ was featured on a single from the debut album of Iranian-Canadian rapper Imaan Faith.

TQ's song Paradise was released on April 29, 2008. This was followed by the Paradise album on June 30, 2009.

On March 23, 2009, TQ released the S.E.X.Y. EP on iTunes. It was made available on CD on June 30. The EP consists of previously unheard TQ material.

TQ released his next album, titled Kind of Blue, on March 23, 2010. TQ recorded the Michael Jackson song "Dirty Diana" for the album.

After a European tour in summer 2010, he co-wrote and recorded "Uh Oh", a pop duet with the British singer-songwriter, Danielle Senior. It was released April 2011. Remixes of "Uh Oh" included the classic soul version by CBKS.

On February 12, 2013, TQ released Legendary, as the follow-up album to Kind of Blue.

TQ released The BAEList – Vol 1 EP on January 12, 2016. It is aimed at his female fans.

TQ's album Coming Home was released on August 11, 2017.

=== Photography ===
In addition to being a professional musician, TQ is a professional photographer. In 2019, TQ expanded his professional media and entertainment endeavors by founding Franchise Sports Media. Franchise Sports Media has conducted photography for professional sports teams such as The Las Vegas Raiders, The Vegas Golden Knights, and The Las Vegas Aces.

== Discography ==
=== Studio albums ===
List of albums, with selected chart positions
Title	Year	Chart positions						
Title	Year	US	AUT	GER	NLD	SWE	SWI	UK
They Never Saw Me Coming	1998	122	50	27	16	59	45	27
The Second Coming	2000	—	—	30	18	—	74	32
Listen	2004	—	—	—	—	—	—	—
Gemini	2007	—	—	—	—	—	—	—
Paradise	2008	—	—	—	—	—	—	—
S.E.X.Y. (EP)	2009	—	—	—	—	—	—	—
Kind of Blue	2010	—	—	—	—	—	—	—
Legendary	2013	—	—	—	—	—	—	—
The BAEList – Vol 1	2016	—	—	—	—	—	—	—
Coming Home	2017	—	—	—	—	—	—	—
Revolution	2018	—	—	—	—	—	—	—

=== Singles ===
List of singles, with selected chart positions
Title	Year	Chart positions									Album	
Title	Year	US	AUS	AUT	GER	IRE	NLD	NZ	SWI	UK	Album	
"Westside"	1998	12	10	29	8	5	3	10	14	4	They Never Saw Me Coming	
"Bye Bye Baby"	1998	—	47	33	6	13	6	—	16	7	They Never Saw Me Coming	
"Better Days"	1999	—	—	—	88	—	88	—	—	32	They Never Saw Me Coming	
"Summertime" (with Another Level)	1999	—	—	—	—	24	—	—	—	7	Nexus	
"Daily"	2000	—	—	—	31	—	23	38	77	14	The Second Coming	
"Ride On" / "Superbitches"	2000	—	—	—	—	—	—	—	—	—	The Second Coming	
"Let's Get Back to Bed – Boy!" (with Sarah Connor)	2001	—	—	5	2	—	—	—	9	16	Green Eyed Soul	
"Keep It on the Low"	2004	—	—	—	—	—	—	—	—	—		
"Right On"	2004	—	—	—	—	—	—	—	—	—	Listen	
"Tear This Bitch Up"	2005	—	—	—	—	—	—	—	—	—	Listen (UK version)	
"Crockett's Theme" (with Jan Hammer and Phillipe)	2006	—	—	—	52	—	—	—	—	—		
"S.E.X.Y."	2008	—	—	—	—	—	—	—	—	—		
"Ghetto Love"	2011	—	—	—	—	—	—	—	—	—		Non-album singles
"Hotel California"	2012	—	—	—	—	—	—	—	—	—		Non-album singles
"Bad Man" (feat. Mystikal)	2013	—	—	—	—	—	—	—	—	—		Non-album singles
"Taylor's Song" (feat. Taylor Lewis Marshall)	2016	—	—	—	—	—	—	—	—	—		Non-album singles
"Freedom"	2017	—	—	—	—	—	—	—	—	—		Coming Home
"The Kingdom"	2018	—	—	—	—	—	—	—	—	—		Revolution
"Rose"	2021	—	—	—	—	—	—	—	—	—		Non-album singles
"Smoke"	2022	—	—	—	—	—	—	—	—	—		Non-album singles
"Disappear"	2023	—	—	—	—	—	—	—	—	—		Non-album singles
"O.G."	2023	—	—	—	—	—	—	—	—	—		Non-album singles
"Blind"	2024	—	—	—	—	—	—	—	—	—		Non-album singles

=== Other songs and collaborations ===
Title	Year	Artist(s)	Album
"Gotta Git Mine"	1997	RBL Posse (feat. TQ, MC Eiht and Tela)	An Eye for an Eye
"Get Away"	1999	TQ and Krayzie Bone	Blue Streak (soundtrack)
"Imagine That"	1999	CJ Mac (feat. TQ)	Platinum Game
"Summertime"	1999	Another Level (feat. TQ)	Nexus
"Summertime (Allstar remix)"	1999	Another Level (feat. TQ)	Nexus
"Get Paid"	2000	Outlawz (feat. TQ)	Ride wit Us or Collide wit Us
"All of My Life"	2001	TQ	Urban Renewal
"My Life"	2001	Juvenile (feat. TQ)	Project English
"Let's Get Back to Bed – Boy!"	2001	Sarah Connor (feat. TQ)	Green Eyed Soul
"Magic Ride (Whatever U Wish 4)"	2001	Sarah Connor (feat. TQ)	Green Eyed Soul
"Let's Get Back to Bed – Boy! (Gena B. Good-Remix)"	2001	Sarah Connor (feat. TQ)	Green Eyed Soul
"Sunny Day"	2002	Big Tymers (feat. TQ, Gotti and Mikkey)	Hood Rich
"I'm Comin'"	2002	Big Tymers (feat. Mikkey, Gilly, Jazze Pha and TQ)	Hood Rich
"Gimme Some"	2002	Big Tymers (feat. TQ and Barewolf)	Hood Rich
"Da Man"	2002	Big Tymers (feat. Trick Daddy and TQ)	Hood Rich
"Way of Life"	2002	Lil Wayne (feat. Big Tymers and TQ)	500 Degreez
"What Does Life Mean to Me"	2002	Lil Wayne (feat. TQ and Big Tymers)	500 Degreez
"Life as a Gangsta"	2002	Da Hood (feat. Birdman and TQ)	Mack 10 Presents da Hood
"Think About You (Looking Through the Window)"	2002	TQ	Undisputed (soundtrack)
"How It Be"	2002	Birdman (feat. Jermaine Dupri and TQ)	Birdman
"Hustlas, Pimps and Thugs"	2002	Birdman (feat. 8Ball, Jazze Pha and TQ)	Birdman
"Fly Away"	2002	Birdman (feat. TQ)	Birdman
"Ice Cold"	2002	Birdman (feat. TQ and Jazze Pha)	Birdman
"Ghetto Life"	2002	Birdman (feat. Lil Wayne, TQ and Cam'ron)	Birdman
"Keeps Spinnin"	2002	Birdman (feat. T.I., Petey Pablo, Lil Wayne, TQ, Mannie Fresh, Stone, Wolf, Bizzy, Gilly and Mikkey)	Birdman
"Bigger Business"	2002	Jadakiss, Ronald Isley, Diddy, Birdman, Snoop Dogg, Cassidy and TQ	Swizz Beatz Presents G.H.E.T.T.O. Stories
"Gangsta Nigga"	2003	Hot Boys (feat. TQ)	Let 'Em Burn
"These Hoes"	2003	Hot Boys (feat. Mannie Fresh and TQ)	Let 'Em Burn
"Baby Girl"	2003	Boo & Gotti (feat. TQ)	Perfect Timing
"Love Is Color-Blind"	2003	Sarah Connor (feat. TQ)	Key to My Soul
"We Can Smoke"	2003	Big Tymers (feat. TQ)	Big Money Heavyweight
"I'm a Ryder"	2004	Drag-On (feat. Baby and TQ)	Hell and Back
"Did You Miss Me"	2004	Petey Pablo (feat. Baby and TQ)	Still Writing in My Diary: 2nd Entry
"Celebrate"	2005	Outlawz (feat. TQ)	Outlaw 4 Life: 2005 A.P.

== Films ==
Year	Title	Role
2006	Rockin' Meera	Rock
2006	Richard III	DJ
2006	The Devil's Grind	
2007	A Father's Love	
2007	Consequences	
2007	The Black	
