= French Kissing (song) =

Single by Sarah Connor

from the album Green Eyed Soul
- Released: 20 August 2001
- Length: 3:35
- Label: X-Cell
- Songwriters: Rob Tyger; Kay Denar; Dr. Dre; Teddy Riley; Chauncey Hannibal; Lynise Walters; William Steward
- Producers: Kay D.; Rob Tyger

Sarah Connor singles chronology
"Let's Get Back to Bed – Boy!" (2001)	"French Kissing" (2001)	"From Sarah with Love" (2001)

"French Kissing" is a song by German singer Sarah Connor. It was written by Rob Tyger and Kay Denar for her debut studio album, Green Eyed Soul (2001). A sensual mid-tempo song about tongue kissing, it is built around a sample of "No Diggity" (1996) by American R&B group Blackstreet featuring Dr. Dre and Queen Pen. Due to the inclusion of the sample, Dr. Dre, Queen Pen, William "Skylz" Stewart and Blackstreet members Teddy Riley and Chauncey Hannibal are also credited as songwriters.

The song was released by X-Cell Records on 20 August 2001 as the second single from Green Eyed Soul. "French Kissing" peaked at number 18 on the Austrian Singles Chart, becoming Connor's second top 20 hit in Austria, and reached number 26 in Germany, where it would remain her lowest-charting single on the German Singles Chart until 2010. A music video, directed by Hannes Rossacher and Frank Wilde, was filmed at Hotel Urania in the Landstraße district of Vienna in July 2001.

== Background ==
"French Kissing" was written and produced by Connor's frequent collaborators, Rob Tyger and Kay Denar, for her debut studio album, Green Eyed Soul (2001). The song samples from American R&B group Blackstreet's song "No Diggity" (1996), which featured rappers Dr. Dre and Queen Pen and samples from the song "Grandma's Hands" by Bill Withers. Due to the inclusion of the sample, Dr. Dre, Queen Pen, William "Skylz" Stewart and Blackstreet members Teddy Riley and Chauncey Hannibal are also credited as songwriters on "French Kissing." Critics also noted an uncredited interpolation from "Tom's Diner" (1990) as performed by American singer Suzanne Vega and English electronic duo DNA.

== Chart performance ==
"French Kissing" was released by X-Cell Records on 20 August 2001 as the second single from Connor's debut album Green Eyed Soul (2001), following "Let's Get Back to Bed – Boy!" (2001). It initially debuted at number 31 on the German Singles Chart in the week of 3 September 2001, before rising to number 26, its peak position, in its third week. The song would spend eleven weeks inside the top 100 of the chart and remain Connor's lowest-charting single until 2010's "Real Love." "French Kissing" fared better in Austria, where it initially debuted at number 67 but peaked at number 18 on the Austrian Singles Chart in the week of 21 October 2001, becoming the singer's second top 20 hit. It spent 13 weeks within the top 75 of the chart. Elsewhere, "French Kissing" reached the top 40 in the Flemish region of Belgium.

== Music video ==
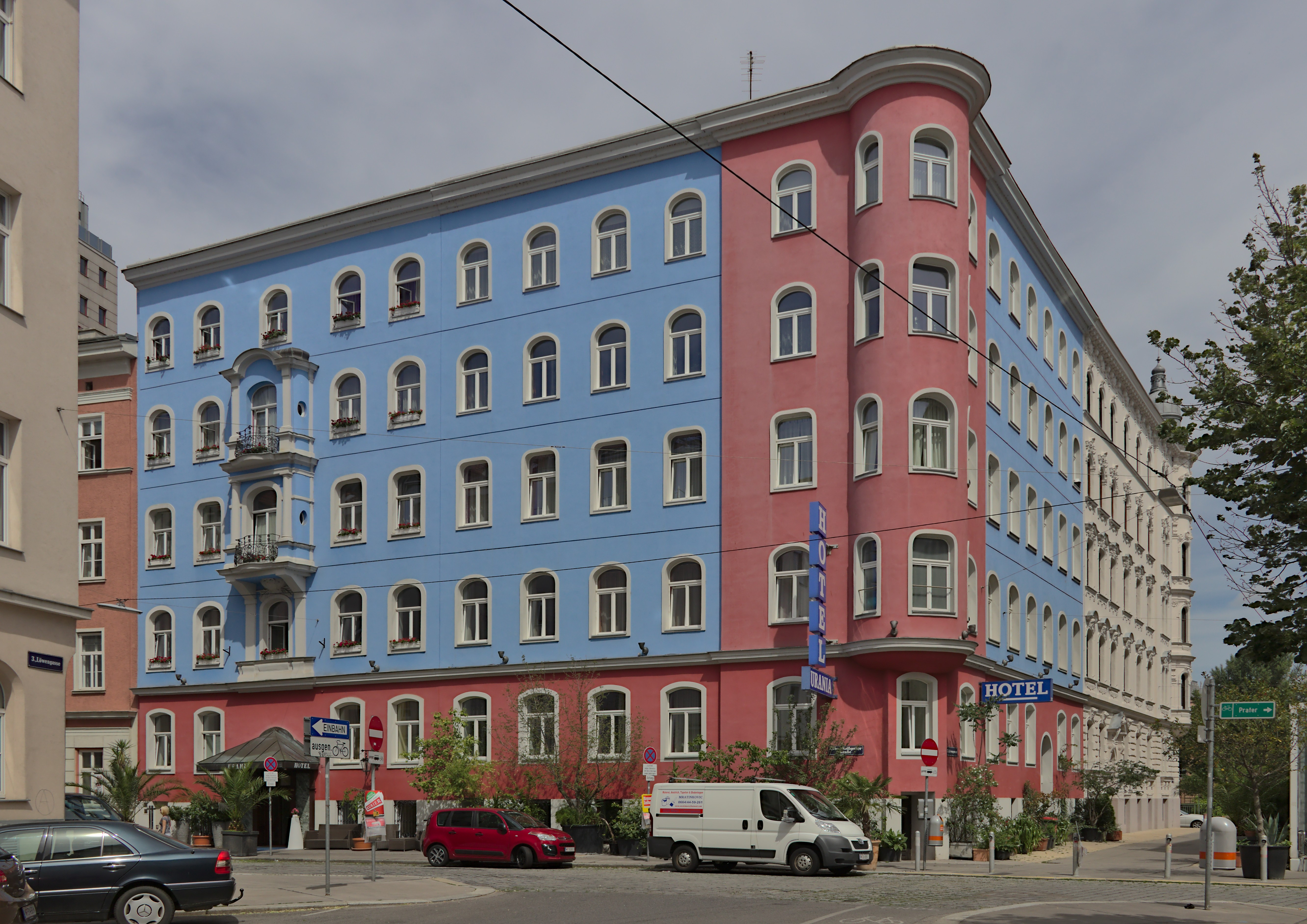
Hotel Urania in Vienna served as the main filming location for "French Kissing."

A music video for "French Kissing" was directed by Hannes Rossacher and Frank Wilde. It was filmed at Hotel Urania, a love hotel in the Landstraße district of Vienna, built in 1889 by Anton Dittrich, in July 2001. In the visuals, Connor, dressed in lingerie, visits a brothel, where she interacts with several employees and others guests. Franz Lichtenegger from online magazine Vice, wrote about the clip in 2017: "The video for hymn "French Kissing" was made in Vienna's Urania Hotel in 2001. Included are: fishnet attire, motion blur, fur, generally a lot of [...] beautiful wallpaper and brothel aesthetics. Rest in peace "Slutty Connor"."

== Track listings ==
German CD single
No.	Title	Producer(s)	Length
1.	"French Kissing" (radio/video version)	Rob Tyger; Kay D.	3:36
2.	"French Kissing" (divine dance remix)	Tyger; Kay D.; Supreme Team^{[a]}	3:59
3.	"French Kissing" (Gena B. good remix)	Tyger; Kay D.; Gena B.^{[a]}	3:46
4.	"French Kissing" (extended remix)	Tyger; Kay D.	5:02

Notes

- ^{^a} denotes additional producer

== Charts ==
Weekly chart performance for "French Kissing"
Chart (2001)	Peak position
Austria (Ö3 Austria Top 40)	18
Belgium (Ultratop 50 Flanders)	40
Germany (GfK)	26
Netherlands (Dutch Top 40)	71
Switzerland (Schweizer Hitparade)	53
