= What Do You Love =

Single by Seeb featuring Jacob Banks

from the EP Intro to Seeb
- Released: 14 October 2016
- Genre: Tropical house; soul
- Length: 3:31
- Label: Seeb Music; Island; Republic; Universal
- Songwriter(s): Jayd Alexander; Espen Berg; Simen Eriksrud; Hannes Netzell; Christian Olsson
- Producer(s): Espen Berg; Simen Eriksrud

Seeb singles chronology
"Breathe" (2016)	"What Do You Love" (2016)	"Under Your Skin" (2017)

Jacob Banks singles chronology
"Redemption" (2015)	"What Do You Love" (2016)	"Unholy War" (2017)

"What Do You Love" is a song from Norwegian EDM record production trio Seeb, featuring vocals from British singer Jacob Banks. The song was written by Jayd Alexander, Hannes Netzell, Christian Olsson, Espen Berg and Simen Eriksrud, with the latter two handling the song's production. It was made available for digital download on 14 October 2016 through Seeb Music, Island Records, and Universal Music Group.

== Charts ==
Chart (2016–17)	Peak position
Finland Airplay (Radiosoittolista)	68
Norway (VG-lista)	2
Poland (Polish Airplay Top 100)	23
Sweden (Sverigetopplistan)	20
US Hot Dance/Electronic Songs (Billboard)	36

== Certifications ==
Region	Certification	Certified units/sales
Norway (IFPI Norway)	2× Platinum	120,000^{‡}
Streaming
Sweden (GLF)	2× Platinum	16,000,000^{†}
^{‡} Sales+streaming figures based on certification alone.^{†} Streaming-only figures based on certification alone.

== Release history ==
Country	Date	Format	Label	Ref.
Various	14 October 2016	Digital download	Sky; Universal	
Italy	21 October 2016	Contemporary hit radio	Universal	
United States	1 November 2016	Dance radio	Island; Republic	
