= Rich Love =

2017 single by OneRepublic

Single by OneRepublic and Seeb
- Released: July 14, 2017
- Genre: Tropical house; pop
- Length: 3:21
- Label: Mosley; Interscope
- Songwriters: Brent Kutzle; Seeb; Ryan Tedder
- Producers: Seeb; Ryan Tedder

OneRepublic singles chronology
"No Vacancy" (2017)	"Rich Love" (2017)	"Stranger Things" (2018)

Seeb singles chronology
"Boys in the Street" (2017)	"Rich Love" (2017)	"Cruel World" (2017)

Music video
- "Rich Love" on YouTube

"Rich Love" is a song by American pop rock band OneRepublic and Norwegian EDM record production trio Seeb. The song was written by Brent Kutzle, Seeb and Ryan Tedder, with the latter two handling the song's production. The pop song was released on July 14, 2017, through Mosley Music Group and Interscope Records.

== Critical reception ==
Sabrina Finkelstein of Billboard magazine described the drop as a "smooth and energetic tropical" one. "OneRepublic dabbling in dance music makes for a summer jam we can get behind!" Katrina Rees of CelebMix felt the song "infectious" and "showcases a slightly different side to OneRepublic". She called the song a "slick dance track" and a "stray-away" from OneRepublic's "typically anthemic sound" with Seeb's influence. Karlie Powell of YourEDM regarded the single as "another mainstream-ish song", and felt the song "almost too catchy thanks to OneRepublic's repertoire of hit-worthy pop music" and is "almost impossible to not sing along". Erik Mahal of EDM Sauce wrote that the vocals are "gorgeous" and "silky smooth and naturally flow with the gorgeous arrangements", and called the track "catchy" and "solid". He felt that the "melodic sections seem familiar" to Seeb's remix of "I Took a Pill in Ibiza", and that the song's originality cannot be retained. "There is nothing wrong on this one, we just know that Seeb could have brought a bit more." Kevin Apaza of Directlyrics called the verses and the chorus "very pop folk, Avicii-esque", while the post-chorus is "an EDM beat drop instrumental". He felt that the song "sounds somewhat generic as a whole".

== Music video ==
The music video was directed by Isaac Rentz and currently has 79 million views.

== Charts ==
=== Weekly charts ===
Chart (2017–18)	Peak position
Australia (ARIA)	97
Austria (Ö3 Austria Top 40)	58
Belgium (Ultratip Bubbling Under Flanders)	10
Belgium (Ultratip Bubbling Under Wallonia)	23
Canada Hot 100 (Billboard)	80
Canada AC (Billboard)	50
Canada Hot AC (Billboard)	47
Czech Republic Airplay (ČNS IFPI)	42
Czech Republic Singles Digital (ČNS IFPI)	26
Germany (GfK)	64
Hungary (Rádiós Top 40)	5
Hungary (Single Top 40)	38
Hungary (Stream Top 40)	27
Ireland (IRMA)	40
Netherlands (Single Top 100)	89
Norway (VG-lista)	7
Poland (Polish Airplay Top 100)	21
Portugal (AFP)	69
Slovakia Airplay (ČNS IFPI)	72
Slovakia Singles Digital (ČNS IFPI)	25
Sweden (Sverigetopplistan)	10
Switzerland (Schweizer Hitparade)	33
UK Singles (OCC)	84
US Bubbling Under Hot 100 (Billboard)	14
US Adult Pop Airplay (Billboard)	24
US Hot Dance/Electronic Songs (Billboard)	15

=== Year-end charts ===
Chart (2017)	Position
Hungary (Rádiós Top 40)	73
Sweden (Sverigetopplistan)	69
US Hot Dance/Electronic Songs (Billboard)	49
Chart (2018)	Position
Hungary (Rádiós Top 40)	38

== Certifications ==
Region	Certification	Certified units/sales
Australia (ARIA)	Gold	35,000^{‡}
Brazil (Pro-Música Brasil)	Gold	30,000^{‡}
Canada (Music Canada)	Gold	40,000^{‡}
Denmark (IFPI Danmark)	Gold	45,000^{‡}
Germany (BVMI)	Gold	200,000^{‡}
Italy (FIMI)	Gold	25,000^{‡}
New Zealand (RMNZ)	Gold	15,000^{‡}
Sweden (GLF)	Platinum	40,000^{‡}
United Kingdom (BPI)	Silver	200,000^{‡}
United States (RIAA)	Gold	500,000^{‡}
^{‡} Sales+streaming figures based on certification alone.

== Release history ==
Region	Date	Format	Label	Ref.
Various	July 14, 2017	Digital download	Mosley Music; Interscope	
United States	September 18, 2017	Hot adult contemporary radio	Interscope	
