= Rob Stevenson =

American music executive

- Born: Robert Louis Stevenson; September 20, 1970 (age 55); Teaneck, New Jersey
- Origin: New York, New York
- Occupations: Music Executive, Partner 300 Entertainment
- Website: 300ent.com

Rob Stevenson is an American music executive and currently Partner at the New York, New York–based 300 Entertainment. Over the course of his career, he has been involved in the development of artists including The Killers, Katy Perry, The Decemberists, Gotye, Post Malone, and others.

== Island Def Jam ==
In 1998, Stevenson joined Island Def Jam Music Group in A&R, where he signed acts including The Killers, Fall Out Boy, and Sum 41. He helped coordinate the label’s partnership with Sony Pictures on the ’‘Spider-Man’’ soundtrack (2002) and oversaw several commercially successful releases. In 2005, ‘‘New York Magazine’’ gave him “The Industry Award,” and in 2006, ‘‘Entertainment Weekly’’ included him on its “Must List.”

=== Notable artists ===
- The Killers
- Fall Out Boy
- Sum 41
- Lady Sovereign
- The Bravery
- Thrice

== Virgin Records America ==
In 2008, Stevenson became President of A&R at Virgin Records America, where he signed Alice in Chains and worked on their album ‘’Black Gives Way to Blue’’. At EMI, he was also involved in Katy Perry’s ‘’Teenage Dream’’ and projects by Beastie Boys, Thirty Seconds to Mars, and The Decemberists.

=== Notable artists ===
- Katy Perry
- Alice In Chains
- Beastie Boys
- Thirty Seconds to Mars
- The Decemberists

== Republic Records ==
In 2011, Stevenson joined Republic Records as Executive Vice President of A&R. He signed Gotye, whose single “Somebody That I Used to Know” became the top-selling song of 2012 and won multiple Grammy Awards. He also helped bring Of Monsters and Men and The Weeknd to the label; both acts achieved multi-platinum success. “Somebody That I Used to Know” then went on to receive Grammy Awards for Best Pop Song by a Duo or Group and Record of the Year. The album Making Mirrors won the Grammy for Best Alternative album.

In 2016, he and A&R executive Tyler Arnold signed Post Malone to Republic. Malone’s albums ‘‘Stoney’’ and ‘‘Beerbongs & Bentleys’’ and singles like “Rockstar” and “Psycho” earned multi-platinum certifications and topped the Billboard Hot 100.

=== Notable Artists ===
- Jessie J
- Gotye
- Of Monsters and Men
- The Weeknd
- Phantogram
- AFI
- James Bay
- Post Malone
- Amine
- Glass Animals

== Casablanca Records ==
As part of his role at Republic Records, Stevenson oversaw the re-launch of Casablanca Records. Originally known for its prominence in 1970s nightlife, the label was repositioned in the 2010s with a focus on electronic and dance music. Artists released under the imprint included Tiësto, Avicii, Alesso, Martin Garrix, C2C, Kavinsky, Bingo Players, and Duck Sauce.

== 300 Entertainment ==
In December 2020, Stevenson joined 300 Entertainment as a partner, working alongside former colleagues from Island Def Jam Music Group. At 300, he is responsible for artist development, digital distribution, and publishing.
