= Elle (album) =

Studio album by Dagny
- Released: 7 June 2024
- Length: 25:53
- Label: Universal; Little Daggers
- Producer: Anton Engdahl; Edvard Førre Erfjord; Jason Gill; Nick Hahn; Tommy King; Oliver Lundström; Simon Oscroft; Cato Sundberg; Kent Sundberg; Tyler Spry; Oskar Widén

Dagny chronology
Strangers / Lovers (2020)	Elle (2024)	Jupiter (2025)

Singles from Elle
- 1. "Heartbreak in the Making" Released: 28 April 2023; 2. "Same Again (For Love)" Released: 16 June 2023; 3. "Ray-Bans" Released: 8 September 2023; 4. "Strawberry Dream" Released: 12 April 2024

Elle is the second studio album by Norwegian singer-songwriter Dagny. It was released on 7 June 2024, through Universal and Little Daggers Records. The album was preceded by the release of four singles: "Heartbreak in the Making", "Same Again (For Love)", "Ray-Bans" and "Strawberry Dream".

== Background ==
After releasing her debut studio album Strangers / Lovers (2020), Dagny had released a collaboration single called "Pretty" (2021) with fellow Norwegian singer-songwriter Astrid S. The song was included in the soundtrack of American romantic comedy film The Hating Game. The song was described as "an electro-pop feel, creating a playful soundscape to carry us through the party season." by some critics. In February 2022, Dagny signed a publishing contract with Sony Music. In June 2022, Dagny released "Brightsider". Dagny released "Highs & Lows" in October 2022. The stripped back ballad diverged from previous synth and anthemic sounds, with Dagny describing the love song as "one of the most raw" she has ever performed.

== Release and promotion ==
Elle was released through Universal and Little Daggers Records on 7 June 2024. It is available on streaming, digital download, and vinyl LP.

=== Title and artwork ===
Dagny unveiled the album's cover and title on 27 May 2024. The tracklist however was unveiled a day before album's release, on 6 June 2024.

=== Singles ===
The album's lead single "Heartbreak in the Making" was released on April 28, 2023, The single has peaked at number nineteen on VG-lista Topp 40 Singles. "Same Again (For Love)" was released as the second single on June 16, 2023. The track had peaked at number 25 on VG-lista. "Ray-Bans" was released on September 8, 2023, as the album's third single. It debuted and peaked at number 39 in Norway. "Strawberry Dream" was released as the fourth and final single from the album on April 12, 2024. The track peaked at number 38 in Norway.

== Commercial performance ==
The album debuted at number eight on the Norwegian VG-lista Topp 40 Album where it stayed for four weeks, earning her second top-ten album.

== Track listing ==
Elle track listing
No.	Title	Writer(s)	Producer(s)	Length
1.	"Heartbreak in the Making"	Dagny Norvoll Sandvik; Maria Hazell; Oliver Lundström	Lundström	3:14
2.	"Same Again (For Love)"	Sandvik; Lise Sofie Reppe; Edvard Førre Erfjord	Erfjord	3:19
3.	"Ray-Bans"	Sandvik; Maureen McDonald; Tyler Spry	Lundström; Spry; Simon Oscroft	3:25
4.	"Somebody's Baby"	Sandvik; Lara Andersson; Lundström; Mikey Gromley	Lundström; Tommy King	2:58
5.	"Hate Being Alone"	Sandvik; Jason Gill; Jon Eyden Ross; Julia Karlsson	Gill; Oskar Widén	3:05
6.	"Strawberry Dream"	Sandvik; Cato Sundberg; Kent Sundberg; Nick Hahn	C. Sundberg; K. Sundberg	3:11
7.	"Close"	Sandvik; Hahn	Hahn	2:58
8.	"In My Bones"	Sandvik; Kristin Carpenter; Anton Engdahl	Lundström; Engdahl	3:39
Total length:				25:53

== Personnel ==
Credits are adapted from Tidal.

=== Musicians ===
- Dagny Norvoll Sandvik – vocals (all tracks), background vocals (tracks 4, 7, 8)
- Oliver Lundström – guitar, keyboards (1, 3, 4); percussion (1, 4), strings conductor (1), programming (4, 8), synthesizer (6)
- Andreas Wiberg – bass, guitar (1)
- Mattias Bylund – strings conductor, synthesizer (1)
- David Bukovinszky – celeste (1)
- Simon Santunione – drums (1)
- Hanna Helgegren – violin (1)
- Mattias Johansson – violin (1)
- Edvard Førre Erfjord – bass, drums, guitar, keyboards, programming (2)
- Tyler Spry – bass, guitar, keyboards, pedal steel guitar, programming (3)
- Simon Oscroft – bass, guitar, keyboards, programming (3)
- Harry Mead – drums (3)
- Jason Gill – bass, drums, guitar, keyboards, programming (5)
- Tommy King – keyboards, percussion, synthesizer (4)
- Eric Ruscinski – bass, guitar (4)
- Kane Ritchotte – drums (4)
- Oskar Widén – guitar (5)
- Nick Hahn – background vocals (6); bass, piano (7)
- Cato Sundberg – background vocals, guitar, keyboards, programming (6)
- Kent Sundberg – background vocals, keyboards, programming (6)
- Knut-Ingolf Brenna – guitar (6)
- Anton Engdahl – background vocals, guitar, keyboards, percussion, piano, programming (8)
- Kristin Carpenter – background vocals (8)

=== Technical ===
- Mattias Bylund – engineering (1)
- Oliver Lundström – engineering (3, 4)
- Mike Eriksson – engineering (3)
- Simon Oscroft – engineering (3)
- Tyler Spry – engineering (3)
- Eric Ruscinski – engineering (4)
- Jon Yeston – engineering (4)
- Simon Bergseth – mixing (1–4, 6, 8)
- Henrik Edenhed – mixing (5)
- Christer-André Cederberg – mixing (7)
- George Tander∅ – mastering

== Charts ==
Chart performance for Elle
Chart (2024)	Peak position
Norwegian Albums (VG-lista)	8

== Release history ==
Release history and formats for Elle
Region	Date	Format(s)	Label(s)	Ref.
Various	7 June 2024	Digital download; streaming; vinyl LP	Universal; Little Daggers Records	
