= Baby Baby Bye Bye =

1960 Sun Records release of "Baby Baby Bye Bye" as a 45 single.

"Baby Baby Bye Bye" is a song recorded by Jerry Lee Lewis and released as a single in March 1960 on Sun Records, Sun 337, featuring the Gene Lowery Singers, backed with "Old Black Joe". The recording was reissued in 1969 as a 7" 45 single as Sun 42 as part of the Sun Golden Treasure Series. The song was also released in the UK in 1960 as a 45 single on London Records as HLS 9131.

== Background ==
"Baby Baby Bye Bye" was recorded for Sun Records. The words and music were credited to Lewis Smith and copyrighted in 1960 although on the label two songwriters are credited, "Lewis, Smith". Discogs credited Jerry Lee Lewis and Huey "Piano" Smith as the songwriters. The personnel were: Jerry Lee Lewis on vocals and piano with the Gene Lowery Singers on background vocals. The B side featured "Old Black Joe" written by Stephen Foster in a new arrangement by Jerry Lee Lewis. The single was released in March, 1960 as Sun 337 with the Matrix # U-393 as by Jerry Lee Lewis with The Gene Lowery Singers. The single was Jerry Lee Lewis's first release in 1960. The song was published by Knox Music, Inc., and Crystal Music.

The song was also released as a 45 single in the UK, Australia, New Zealand, France, and Japan.

The single reached No. 47 on the UK singles chart in June, 1960 in a one-week chart run.

== Album Appearances ==
"Baby Baby Bye Bye" appeared on the following albums:

- Jerry Lee Lewis: Nuggets, Charly Records, 1977
- Jerry Lee Lewis: Classic, Bear Family Records, 1989
- High School Confidential [Single], Collectables, 1992
- Great Stars of Rock 'N' Roll, Vol. 2, Fat Boy, 1995
- The EP Collection, Vol. 2...Plus, See For Miles Records, 1996
- Complete Sun Singles, Vol. 4, Bear Family Records, 1997
- Jerry Lee Lewis: The Essential Sun Collection, Recall (UK), 1999
- 25 All-Time Greatest Sun Recordings, Varese Sarabande, 2000

== Sources ==
- Bonomo, Joe (2009). Jerry Lee Lewis: Lost and Found. New York: Continuum Books.
- Tosches, Nick (1982). Hellfire. New York: Grove Press.
- Gutterman, Jimmy (1991). Rockin' My Life Away: Listening to Jerry Lee Lewis. Nashville: Rutledge Hill Press.
- Gutterman, Jimmy (1993). The Jerry Lee Lewis Anthology: All Killer, No Filler. Rhino Records.
- Lewis, Myra; Silver, Murray (1981). Great Balls of Fire: The Uncensored Story of Jerry Lee Lewis. William Morrow/Quill/St. Martin's Press.
