= Let's Get Back to Bed – Boy! =

2001 single by Sarah Connor

Single by Sarah Connor featuring TQ

from the album Green Eyed Soul
- Released: 7 May 2001
- Length: 3:56
- Label: X-Cell
- Songwriters: Kay Denar; Rob Tyger; Terrance Quaites
- Producers: Kay D.; Rob Tyger

Sarah Connor singles chronology
"Let's Get Back to Bed – Boy!" (2001)	"French Kissing" (2001)

TQ singles chronology
"Daily" (2000)	"Let's Get Back to Bed – Boy!" (2001)	"Keep It on the Low" (2003)

"Let's Get Back to Bed – Boy!" is a song by German recording artist Sarah Connor. Written and produced by frequent collaborative duo Rob Tyger and Kay Denar, the song features American R&B singer TQ. Conceived for Connor's debut album, Green Eyed Soul (2001), the track is built around a mandolin sample and scratching hip hop beats, over which Connor, as the female protagonist, adopts sensual vocals and expresses her desire to have intercourse with her partner, inviting him to her bed.

The song was released as the album's lead single in Germany on 7 May 2001 and peaked at number two on the German Singles Chart for two weeks. It also reached the top ten in Austria and Switzerland as well as the top 20 in Norway and the United Kingdom. "Let's Get Back to Bed – Boy!" was nominated for Best National Single – Rock/Pop at the 2002 ECHO Awards, and received Gold status in Austria and Germany. A music video for the song, directed by Oliver Sommer, was filmed in Vancouver in 2001.

== Background ==
"Let's Get Back to Bed – Boy!" was written by Connor's frequent collaborators, Rob Tyger and Kay Denar, along with American rapper TQ for her debut studio album, Green Eyed Soul (2001). Built around a mandolin sample and scratching hip hop beats, it has Connor, as the female protagonist, adopting sensual vocals and expressing her desire to have sex with her partner, inviting him to her bed. "Let's Get Back to Bed – Boy!" was one out of three songs, along with "Magic Ride (Whatever U Wish 4)" and "Can't Get None," which TQ contributed to Green Eyed Soul.

== Chart performance ==
"Let's Get Back to Bed – Boy!" was released by X-Cell Records on 7 May 2001 as Connor's debut single as well as the first single from her debut album Green Eyed Soul (2001). It initially debuted at number 20 on the German Singles Chart in the week of 21 May 2001, before rising to number two, its peak position, in its sixth week. The song would spend 17 weeks inside the top 100 of the chart. Still in 2021, it was awarded Gold by the Bundesverband Musikindustrie (BVMI) for shipments figures of more than 250,000 copies. GfK ranked it 19th on its 2001 year-end singles chart. Elsewhere, "Let's Get Back to Bed – Boy!" reached the top five in Austria and the top ten in Croatia and Switzerland. On 3 September 2001, the song was certified Gold by the International Federation of the Phonographic Industry (IFPI).

== Music video ==
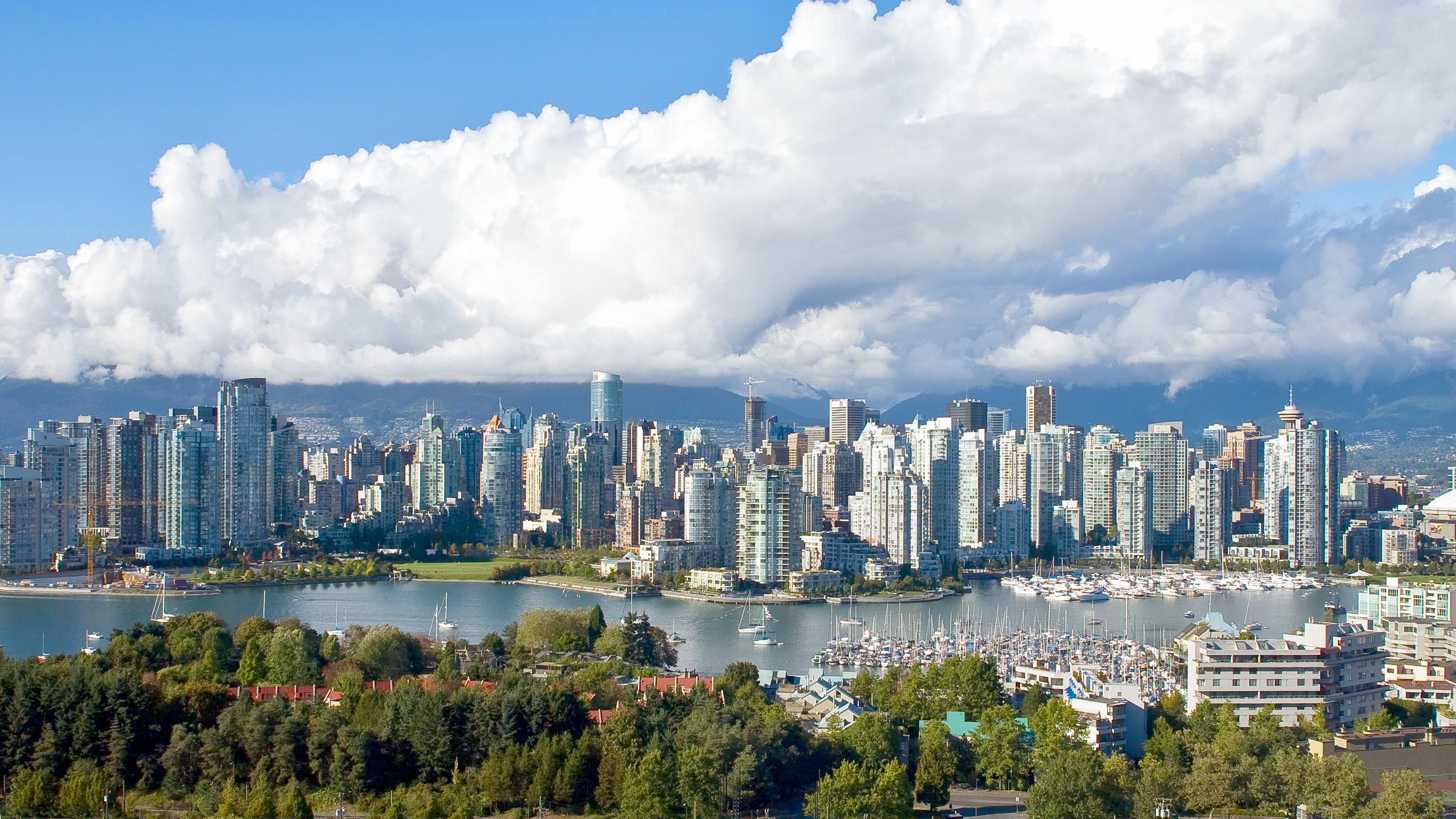
Filming took place in Vancouver, particularly an elaborate Spanish Colonial Revival mansion.

A music video for "Let's Get Back to Bed – Boy!," featuring both Connor and TQ, was directed by Oliver Sommer. It was largely filmed at Rio Vista, an elaborate Spanish Colonial Revival mansion in Vancouver's Southlands neighbourhood which was designed by architect Bernard Palmer in 1930 for Henry Frederick Reifel. The video begins at a large mansion, where Connor is in the bathtub. A party is happening downstairs, and we see TQ arriving and mingling with various women. Connor finishes getting ready and heads downstairs, catching the attention of TQ and the other guests. Connor and TQ then retire to the bedroom to engage in sexual intercourse, implied through the removal of clothing and the pair embracing. The video ends with Connor and TQ leaving the house and heading towards their car, before deciding they are not quite finished in the bedroom, heading back inside whilst embracing and laughing together.

== Track listings ==
German CD single
No.	Title	Producer(s)	Length
1.	"Let's Get Back to Bed – Boy!" (radio/video) (klimax)	Rob Tyger; Kay D.	3:57
2.	"Let's Get Back to Bed – Boy!" (club remix radio) (4Play)	Tyger; Kay D.; Supreme Team^{[a]}	3:58
3.	"Let's Get Back to Bed – Boy!" (Sly's dub remix (chill out)	Tyger; Kay D.; Sly Dunbar^{[a]}	4:17
4.	"Let's Get Back to Bed – Boy!" (club remix) (main part)	Tyger; Kay D.; Supreme Team^{[a]}	5:25

European CD single
No.	Title	Producer(s)	Length
1.	"Let's Get Back to Bed – Boy!" (radio/video) (klimax)	Tyger; Kay D.	3:57
2.	"Let's Get Back to Bed – Boy!" (club remix radio) (4Play)	Tyger; Kay D.; Supreme Team^{[a]}	3:58

UK CD single
No.	Title	Producer(s)	Length
1.	"Let's Get Back to Bed – Boy!" (radio/video) (klimax)	Tyger; Kay D.	3:57
2.	"Let's Get Back to Bed – Boy!" (Blacksmith R&B 12-inch rub)	Tyger; Kay D.; Blacksmith^{[a]}	5:20
3.	"Let's Get Back to Bed – Boy!" (Sly's dub remix (chill out)	Tyger; Kay D.; Dunbar^{[a]}	4:17
4.	"Let's Get Back to Bed – Boy!" (club remix) (main part)	Tyger; Kay D.; Supreme Team^{[a]}	5:25
5.	"Let's Get Back to Bed – Boy!" (music video)

UK cassette single
No.	Title	Producer(s)	Length
1.	"Let's Get Back to Bed – Boy!" (radio/video) (klimax)	Tyger; Kay D.	3:57
2.	"Let's Get Back to Bed – Boy!" (Blacksmith R&B radio rub)	Tyger; Kay D.; Blacksmith^{[a]}	3:58
3.	"Let's Get Back to Bed – Boy!" (club remix radio)	Tyger; Kay D.; Supreme Team^{[a]}	3:58

Notes

- ^{^a} denotes additional producer

== Charts ==
=== Weekly charts ===
Weekly chart performance for "Let's Get Back to Bed – Boy!"
Chart (2001–2002)	Peak position
Austria (Ö3 Austria Top 40)	5
Belgium (Ultratop 50 Flanders)	31
Croatia (HRT)	8
Europe (Eurochart Hot 100)	15
France (SNEP)	50
Germany (GfK)	2
Norway (VG-lista)	18
Poland (PiF PaF)	17
Switzerland (Schweizer Hitparade)	9
UK Singles (Official Charts)	16

=== Year-end charts ===
Year-end chart performance for "Let's Get Back to Bed – Boy!"
Chart (2001)	Position
Austria (Ö3 Austria Top 40)	36
Germany (Media Control)	19
Switzerland (Schweizer Hitparade)	55

== Certifications ==
Certifications for "Let's Get Back to Bed – Boy!"
Region	Certification	Certified units/sales
Austria (IFPI Austria)	Gold	20,000^{*}
Germany (BVMI)	Gold	250,000^{^}
^{*} Sales figures based on certification alone.^{^} Shipments figures based on certification alone.

== Release history ==
Release dates and formats for "Let's Get Back to Bed – Boy!"
Region	Date	Format(s)	Label(s)	Ref.
Germany	7 May 2001	CD	X-Cell	
United Kingdom	1 October 2001	CD; cassette	Epic	
