= Jacob Banks =

English singer-songwriter (born 1991)

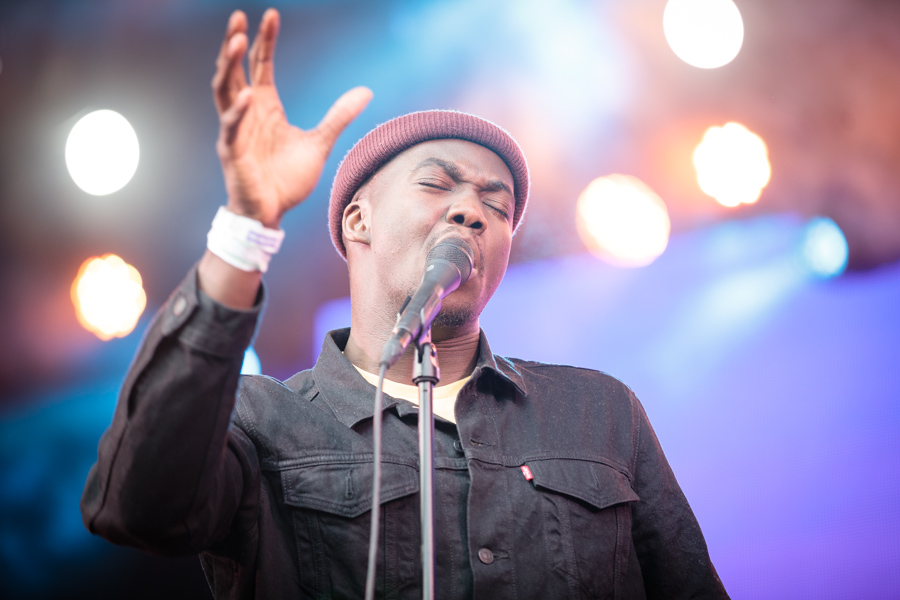
- Jacob Banks performing in 2018

Background information
- Also known as: Jacob Banks
- Born: Jacob Akintayo Akinoso; 24 July 1991 (age 34); Nigeria
- Genres: R&B; hip hop
- Occupations: Singer; songwriter
- Instruments: Vocals; guitar; piano
- Years active: 2012–present
- Label: Interscope
- Website: www.mrjacobbanks.com

Jacob Banks (born 24 July 1991) is a Nigerian-born English singer and songwriter from Birmingham. Banks won the 2012 MOBO UnSung regional competition in Birmingham and the Adidas "Are You In" music competition. His music is influenced by a range of genres including soul, R&B and hip hop. Banks is currently signed with American label Interscope Records.

== Music career ==
=== 2012–present: Breakthrough ===
In October 2012 he recorded his debut EP titled The Monologue which was released in January 2013. The second release from The Monologue, titled "Worthy", was played by BBC Radio 1 DJ Zane Lowe as his "Next Hype" record on his Radio 1 show and received additional plays on 1Xtra, XFM, 6Music and Annie Nightingale. In April 2013, Banks played his first headline show at the London St Pancras Old Church. He supported Emeli Sande on her April 2013 UK tour. Banks features on Wretch 32's song "Doing OK", the second single from Wretch's forthcoming third studio album. Banks features on Chase and Status' "Alive" from their album, Brand New Machine. He also supported them, on their Brand New Machine 2013 UK tour. Banks announced he was to release a joint EP featuring himself, Wretch 32 and George the Poet titled Gambling Man in 2013. However, this did not occur. On 1 May 2014, his collaboration with All About She, "I Can't Wait", was released for free download as part of their debut extended play Go Slow. Banks has also worked with other artists such as Bondax, Jake Gosling, Knox Brown, Plan B and Wretch 32.

On 21 July 2015, Banks' second extended play entitled The Paradox was released. It features a guest appearance from Odd Child Recordings rapper Avelino on the track "Monster".

In 2016, Banks was featured on Norwegian production team Seeb's release, "What Do You Love". The song reached number 2 on VG-lista, the official Norwegian singles chart.

On 9 March 2017, Banks premiered his two-part narrative video, written and co-directed by himself, for his single, "Unholy War". The single is off his EP, 'The Boy Who Cried Freedom'. In November 2018, he released his new album, "Village", which made No. 1 on new and upcoming albums on Spotify.

== In popular culture ==
Banks' song, "Monster 2.0" was featured in the Codemasters game, Dirt 4.

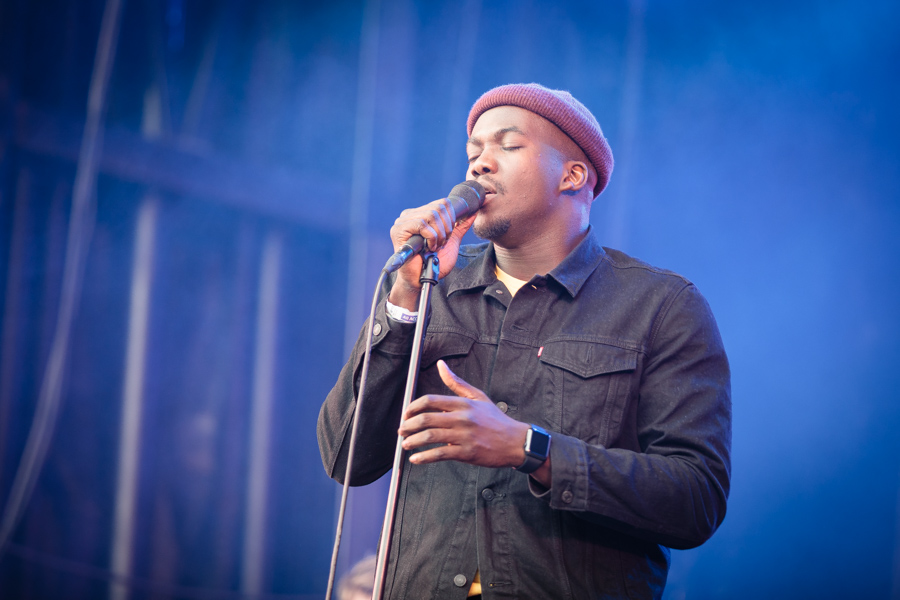
Jacob Banks at the stage in Frogner Park, which took place on 17 June 2018 in Oslo.

"Move With You" was featured in the EA Sports game, FIFA 15.

In 2013, "Worthy" was played on the American TV series Suits in season 3, episode 9.

"Unknown" was featured in the Season 3 finale of the Starz TV series Power, and received viral attention for his tremendous voice. This attention led to the song "Monster" featuring in the first episode of season 4.

In 2021, “Unknown” was featured on A spinoff of the Power Series Power Book 2: Ghost Season 2 Episode 5.

In 2018, "Unknown" was featured during the TV Series Suits in season 7, episode 13.

"Monster" was used during the TV series "Quantico" in Season 1 Episode 2 which aired in October 2015. "Monster" was also sampled to create rapper Flawless real talk's song of the same name.

In 2017, "Unholy War" was featured in the season finale of the TV series Redemption, Season 3 Episode 3 of the TV Series Lucifer and in the reveal trailer for the 2017 Need for Speed game, Need for Speed: Payback. In 2018, "Unholy War" was featured during the season 1 finale of the TV series Black Lightning. It was also featured on the Starz TV series Power.

In 2018 Banks penned and performed the song "In The Name of Love" for the movie The Equalizer 2.

"Love Ain't Enough" was used in the EA Sports game, FIFA 19.

Banks' collaboration with X Ambassadors, "Baptize Me" was featured in the 'Game of Thrones' soundtrack.

In 2018, "Unholy War" was used in the TV series "Queen of the South" in season 3, episode 5.

In 2019, "Every Age" was featured in a commercial for the gum brand Extra.

In 2020, "Slow Up" was used in the second season of the British series "Save Me".

In 2021, "Slow Up" was used in the Netflix film Fatherhood, "Found " was featured in the final season of Lucifer, and "Something Beautiful" was featured in the feature film Tom & Jerry.

In 2019, "Unknown (To You)" was used in the TV series The Resident in season 2, episode 20.

In 2023 "Monster" was used in the final installment of the Equalizer franchise, The Equalizer 3.

In May 2024, “Slow Up” was featured at the end of episode 6, season 2, of The Responder, which aired on BBC One, BBC iPlayer and on Britbox in July 2024.

== Discography ==
=== Albums ===
Title	Details
Village	Released: 2 November 2018; Label: Interscope; Format: Digital download, CD
Lies About the War	Released: 26 August 2022; Label: Nobody Records; Format: Digital download, CD, LP
Our Time Together (Live)	Released: 11 July 2024; Label: Nobody Records; Format: Digital download, CD; Sound Engineer : Thierry Galeuchet

=== Extended plays ===
Title	Details
The Monologue	Released: 26 April 2013; Label: Full + Bless, Renowned; Format: Digital download
The Paradox	Released: 21 July 2015; Label: Full + Bless, Renowned; Format: Digital download
The Boy Who Cried Freedom	Released: 20 April 2017; Label: Interscope; Format: Digital download
For My Friends	Released : 12 March 2021; Label : Darkroom/Interscope Records; Format : Digital download
Yonder: Book I	Released : 21 November 2024; Label : Nobody Records; Format : Digital download
Yonder: Book II	Released : 29 January 2025; Label : Nobody Records; Format : Digital download
Yonder: Book III	Released : 5 March 2025; Label : Nobody Records; Format : Digital download

=== Singles ===
==== As lead artist ====
Title	Year	Album
"Kids on the Corner"	2013	The Monologue
"Worthy"	2013	The Monologue
"Move with You"	2014	FIFA 15 (soundtrack)
"Monster" (featuring Avelino)	2015	The Paradox
"Grace"	2015	The Paradox
"Unholy War"	2017	The Boy Who Cried Freedom
"Chainsmoking"	2017	The Boy Who Cried Freedom
"Unknown (To You)"	2017	Village
"Be Good to Me" (featuring Seinabo Sey)	2018	Village
"Love Ain't Enough" (with Ghetts)	2019	Non-album singles
"Every Age"	2019	Non-album singles
"Like You'll Never See Me Again"	2020	Non-album singles
"Blame" (with Grace Carter)	2020	Non-album singles
"Stranger"	2020	Non-album singles
"Devil That I Know"	2020	Non-album singles

==== As featured artist ====
Title	Year	Peak chart positions							Certifications	Album
Title	Year	UK	UK Dance	UK Indie	UK R&B	SCO	NOR	SWE	Certifications	Album
"Doing OK" (Wretch 32 featuring Jacob Banks)	2014	60	—	8	12	—	—	—		—N/a
"Alive" (Chase & Status featuring Jacob Banks)	2014	21	4	—	—	26	—	—	BPI: Gold	Brand New Machine
"Redemption" (Sigma and Diztortion featuring Jacob Banks)	2015	138	—	—	—	—	—	—		Life
"Love Me" (WiDE AWAKE featuring Jacob Banks)	2016	—	—	—	—	—	—	—		—N/a
"What Do You Love" (Seeb featuring Jacob Banks)	2016	—	—	—	—	—	2	20	IFPI NOR: 2× Platinum	Intro to Seeb
"Remember" (Seinabo Sey featuring Jacob Banks)	2018	—	—	—	—	—	—	—		I'm a Dream
"Only Way Is Up" (Gaël Faye featuring Jacob Banks)	2020	—	—	—	—	—	—	—		Lundi Méchant
"—" denotes single that did not chart or was not released in that territory.

=== Other appearances ===
Title	Year	Album
"Jail" (Nick Brewer featuring Jacob Banks)	2013	Flat 10 EP
"I Can't Wait" (All About She featuring Jacob Banks)	2014	Go Slow EP
"Blame it On Love" (Uppermost featuring Jacob Banks)	2015	New Moon EP
