= Breathe (Seeb song) =

Single by Seeb featuring Neev

from the EP Intro to Seeb
- Released: 11 March 2016
- Genre: Tropical house
- Length: 4:00
- Label: Sky; Island; Virgin; Universal
- Songwriters: Espen Berg; Tiago Carvalho; Simen Eriksrud; Bernardo Neves
- Producers: Espen Berg; Simen Eriksrud

Seeb singles chronology
"Simple Life" (2015)	"Breathe" (2016)	"What Do You Love" (2016)

Neev singles chronology
"Breathe" (2016)

Music video
- "Breathe" on YouTube

"Breathe" is the debut single by Norwegian electronic dance music record production trio Seeb, with vocals by Portuguese singer Bernardo Neves, known by his stage name Neev.

== Background ==
The song was written by Tiago Carvalho, Bernardo Neves, Espen Berg and Simen Eriksrud, with the latter two producing the song. It was made available for digital download on 11 March 2016 through Seeb Music, Island Records, Virgin Records and Universal Music Group. In May 2016, the song was incorporated into the official soundtrack album for MTV's Scream Season 2, appearing throughout the season, and re-released with Scream: Music from Season Two on July 29, 2016, under Island Records.

== Charts ==
=== Weekly charts ===
Chart (2016)	Peak position
Austria (Ö3 Austria Top 40)	49
Belgium (Ultratip Bubbling Under Wallonia)	33
Belgium Dance (Ultratop Flanders)	48
Belgium Dance (Ultratop Wallonia)	27
Finland (Suomen virallinen lista)	27
France (SNEP)	54
Germany (GfK)	43
Netherlands (Dutch Top 40)	30
Netherlands (Single Top 100)	72
Norway (VG-lista)	7
Slovakia Airplay (ČNS IFPI)	63
Slovakia Singles Digital (ČNS IFPI)	92
Slovenia (SloTop50)	19
Sweden (Sverigetopplistan)	13
US Hot Dance/Electronic Songs (Billboard)	28

=== Year-end charts ===
Chart (2016)	Position
Sweden (Sverigetopplistan)	81

== Certifications ==
Region	Certification	Certified units/sales
Denmark (IFPI Danmark)	Gold	45,000^{‡}
France (SNEP)	Gold	100,000^{‡}
Germany (BVMI)	Gold	200,000^{‡}
Norway (IFPI Norway)	3× Platinum	120,000^{‡}
Streaming
Sweden (GLF)	2× Platinum	16,000,000^{†}
^{‡} Sales+streaming figures based on certification alone.^{†} Streaming-only figures based on certification alone.

== Release history ==
Country	Date	Format	Label	Ref.
Various	11 March 2016	Digital download	Sky; Universal	
Italy	25 March 2016	Contemporary hit radio	Universal	
