= Dagny (singer) =

Norwegian singer and songwriter (b. 1990)

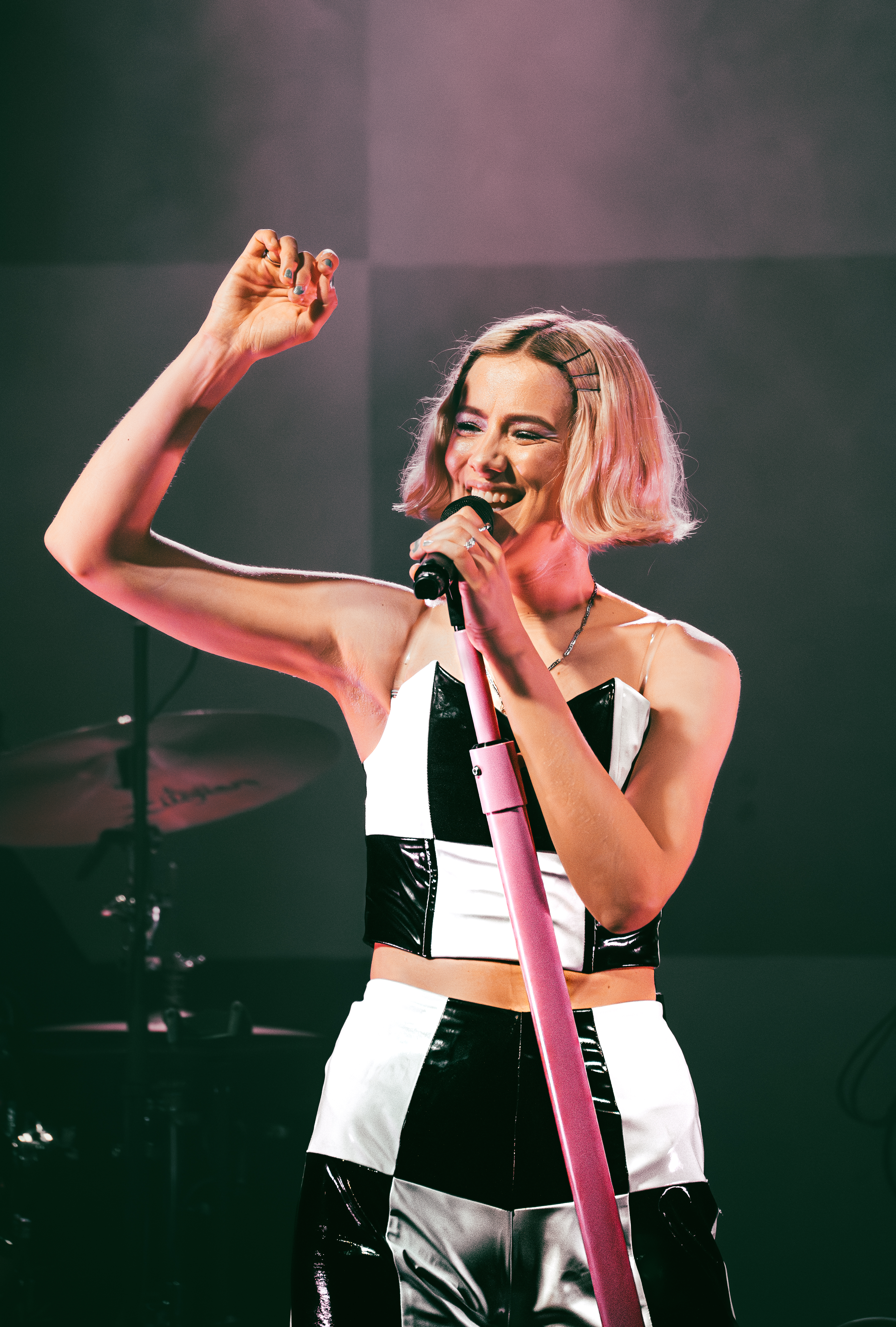
- Dagny in 2024

Background information
- Born: Dagny Norvoll Sandvik; 23 July 1990 (age 36); Tromsø, Norway
- Genres: Pop; indie pop; dance-pop; electropop; synth-pop; disco; synthwave
- Occupations: Singer; songwriter
- Years active: 2009–present
- Labels: Republic; Propeller; Little Daggers
- Website: dagnymusic.com

Dagny Norvoll Sandvik (born 23 July 1990), known mononymously as Dagny, is a Norwegian singer and songwriter. Her music is pop-based, incorporating elements of indie, dance, synth-pop, electropop and disco. She has released two studio albums, Strangers / Lovers (2020) and Elle (2024), and one EP, Ultraviolet (2016). Her single "Somebody" won Song of the Year at the 2020 P3 Gull, and her 2017 track "Love You Like That" was the basis for Katy Perry's "Never Really Over" (2019). She frequently performs at festivals in Norway and the United Kingdom including Øyafestivalen, Stavernfestivalen, and Bergenfest.

Dagny was nominated for Newcomer of the Year at the Spellemannprisen in 2016 and Songwriter of the Year in 2018. Her songs "Backbeat", "Wearing Nothing" and "Somebody" were Spellemann-nominated for Song of the Year in 2016, 2017, and 2020, respectively.

== Early life ==
Dagny was born and raised in Tromsø, Norway. She is the youngest daughter of vocalist Marit Sandvik and jazz musician Øystein Norvoll. She describes her childhood as very musical. She has two older siblings, Juna and Bjørn. At 15 years old, Bjørn was diagnosed with blood cancer, which played a big role in her life.

Dagny enjoyed performing from an early age although was unsure about following a career in music. Her first performance was at one of her parents' shows when she was six years old, where she performed a song she learned in school. Her interest was sparked following a songwriting assignment at school. Following encouragement from a teacher and her family, she began song writing and performing in her hometown. She found her love of music from The Spice Girls, inspired by Mel B.

== Career ==
=== 2008–2014: Early career ===
Dagny began her music career performing locally in Tromsø. With her friend June Cecile Egerton, she formed the duo 'June Og Dagny' and posted the songs "Don`t Know Why" to YouTube in March 2009 and "My Ghost" to YouTube in September 2009. In 2010, Dagny moved to the United Kingdom in "the spirit of adventure" with June remaining in Tromsø. In retrospect she stated she felt lucky to experiment with music in her hometown, "[playing] live in peace for years before getting exposed to outside pressure."

Dagny initially resided in Liverpool, where she was a part of the Liverpool Institute for Performing Arts, before settling in London the following year. She performed acoustic music and folk-pop songs at small club circuits and pop-up events with her boyfriend at the time, Richard Craker, and the duo released the EP Things We'll Never Say (2010).

In 2012, Dagny performed in London and Tromsø, while also working part time in a clothes shop, wine bar and elderly home. She also was the opening act for Elton John at the Døgnvill festival and for Sting at a performance in Bangkok.

In 2014, she performed for the first time at the Isle of Wight Festival. In June 2014, she was the opening act for Bryan Adams for a performance at Clam Castle in Austria.

=== 2015–2019: Breakthrough, Ultraviolet ===
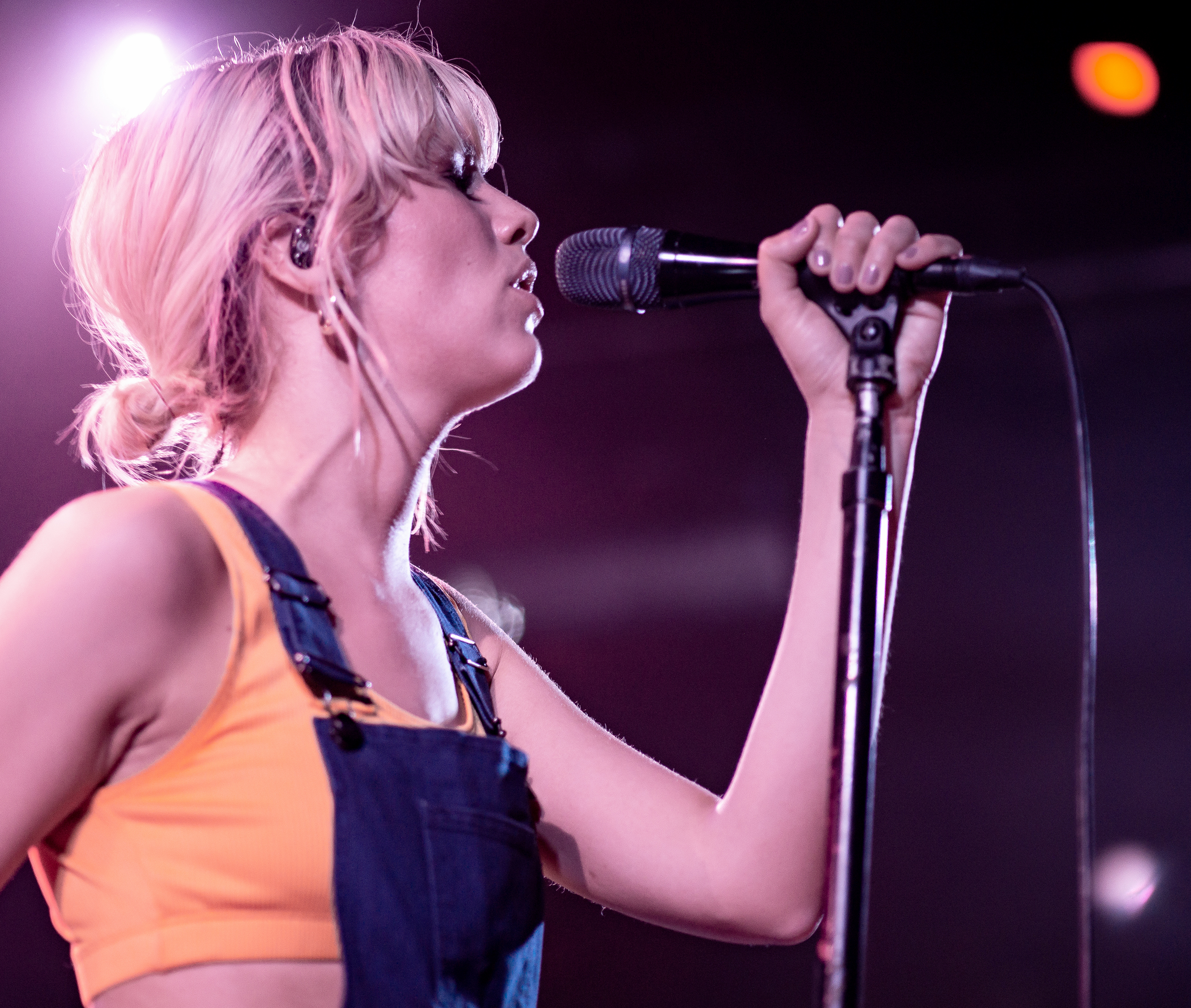
Dagny performing live at The Troubadour in Los Angeles on May 3, 2018

In 2015, Dagny felt her music career had stalled, stating "things weren't really going anywhere." She enrolled in university in Tromsø to undertake a degree in digital media design. After studying for six months, she returned to music following encouragement from her family.

In the autumn of 2015, Dagny recorded "Backbeat" in a studio near London Bridge with her then-bandmates, two English musicians, "Harry and Richard". Described as having a "pounding indie pop vibe", it caught the attention of Zane Lowe at Apple Music 1 station and appeared on the Spotify New Music playlist, achieving 300,000 plays in a few days. By mid-2016, the song had accrued over 20 million plays on Spotify. The acoustic version of the song was featured in the Grey's Anatomy episode "True Colors."

As a result of the song's success, Dagny received recording contracts with Propeller Recordings (covering Scandinavia) and Republic Records (for the rest of the world) under Rob Stevenson. Following this, she played at Eurosonic Noorderslag, by:Larm, and Trondheim Calling. In the same year, "Backbeat" was nominated for Song of the Year under the 2016 Spellemannprisen, while Dagny was nominated for Newcomer of the Year.

In 2016, Dagny released her follow-up single "Fool's Gold", which was the fourth most played on the Norwegian radio station NRK P3. The same year she released her EP, Ultraviolet. The Guardian described it as an "exuberant but pensive riot of pounding drums, live instrumentation and just enough electronic flourishes to give it a modern edge, combined with some truly extraordinary songwriting."

In May 2017, Dagny performed at The Great Escape Festival. That month, she also released the single "Wearing Nothing". In October 2017, she released "Love You Like That". She received international recognition as 'One To Watch' for 2017 from both Billboard and VEVO. Dagny also recorded a cover version of Rachel Stevens' version of "More, More, More" which was used by Target in a commercial campaign introducing its line of new products in the fall of 2017. Dagny was featured on the singles "Man In The Moon" by LCAW released in February 2017 and "Summer of Love" by NOTD released in August 2017.

The singles "That Feeling When" and "Used To You" were released in 2018, alongside a cover of the Fleetwood Mac song "Landslide." Dagny also partnered with Seeb for the single "Drink About", which topped the Norwegian Songs Chart.

Dagny was featured on the singles "Turn" by The Wombats released in May 2018 and "Hit Your Heart" by Steve Aoki released in March 2019. The latter proved popular on club circuits, with Harper's Bazaar praising the song, urging readers to "add [it] to your weekend party playlist ASAP." In May 2019, Katy Perry released "Never Really Over", which she said was inspired by Dagny's song "Love You Like That" and Dagny received songwriting credits on the song.

=== 2020–2022: Strangers / Lovers ===
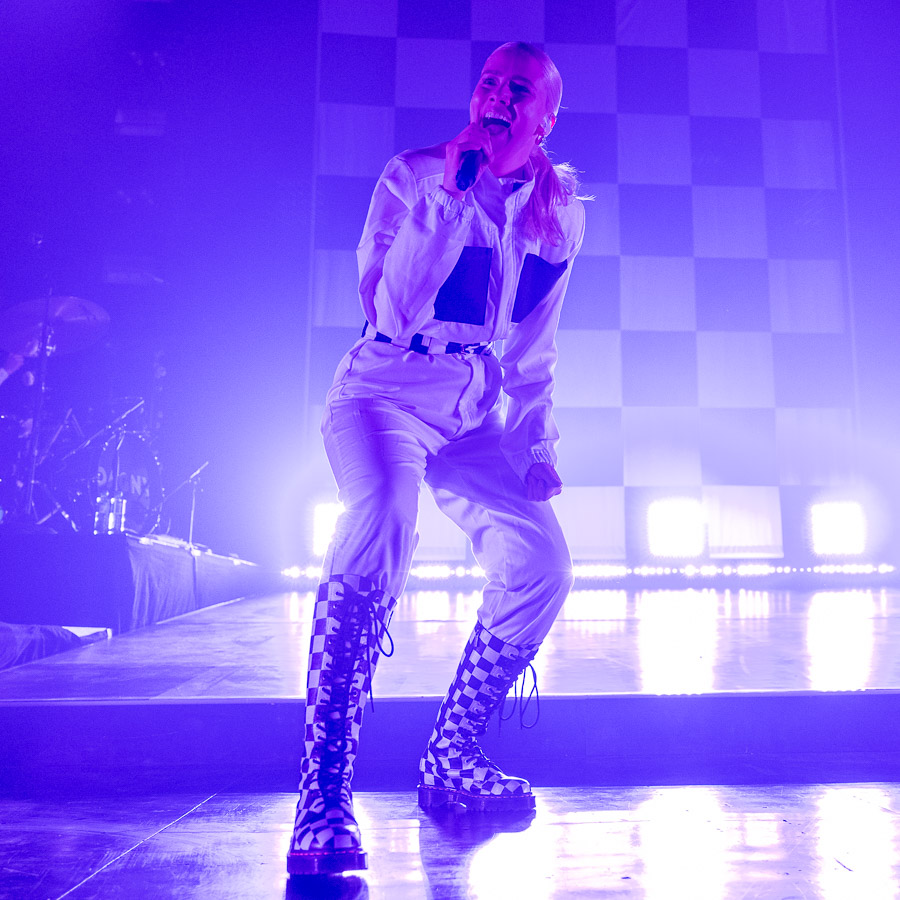
Dagny performing live at Sentrum Scene in Oslo on March 11, 2022

Dagny and Republic Records parted ways over disagreements on album content, leading Dagny to develop her own label, Little Daggers.

Dagny released her debut album Strangers / Lovers partially in May 2020 and partially in October 2020. The album launched in two parts, reflecting the different phases of a romantic relationship and the associated nostalgic feelings, with Dagny describing how "the idea of going from strangers to lovers and then back to strangers is brutal." Side A tracks the beginnings of a relationship, with bright and upbeat songs like "Come Over" and "Somebody." Side B had a more melancholic focus relating to the end of a relationship, as evident in the tracks "Please Look At Me" and "It's Only A Heartbreak." Thematically, Dagny also stated she was inspired by the long periods of day and night in northern Norway, stating "I wanted to make something that had both a light and a dark side. Side A is upbeat like summer, while Side B feels more like Autumn.” Some of the songs were inspired by relationship elements in old films and TV shows that Dagny enjoyed growing up. The song "Coulda Woulda Shoulda" is based on the episode of the same name from the American TV series Sex and the City (Season 4, Episode 11), while the song "It's Only A Heartbreak" is based on the classic film Casablanca. Strangers / Lovers was described as "one of 2020's most assured debuts." The album peaked at number 2 on the Norwegian VG-lista Topp 40 Album. The second song of the album, "Somebody", won Song of the Year at the 2020 P3 Gull.

Dagny starred in Season 2 of the Netflix series Home for Christmas in December 2020, as the character Nurse Lisa. The acoustic version of her hit single "Somebody" and the song "Bye Bye Baby" from Strangers / Lovers were also used in the show.

In January 2021, Dagny performed her catalogue with the Norwegian Radio Orchestra to celebrate its 75th birthday.

Dagny co-performed the song "Pretty" in December 2021 with fellow Norwegian artist Astrid S for the soundtrack to the romantic comedy The Hating Game (2021). The song peaked at number 10 on the Norwegian Singles Top 20. Her song "Somebody" also formed part of the soundtrack.

In February 2022, Dagny signed a publishing contract with Sony Music. In June 2022, Dagny released "Brightsider". Dagny released "Highs & Lows" in October 2022. The stripped back ballad diverged from previous synth and anthemic sounds, with Dagny describing the love song as "one of the most raw" she has ever performed.

In November 2022, Dagny collaborated with Kygo on the "cathartic breakup" synth-pop song "Lonely Together".

=== 2023–present: Elle and Dancefloor Erotica ===
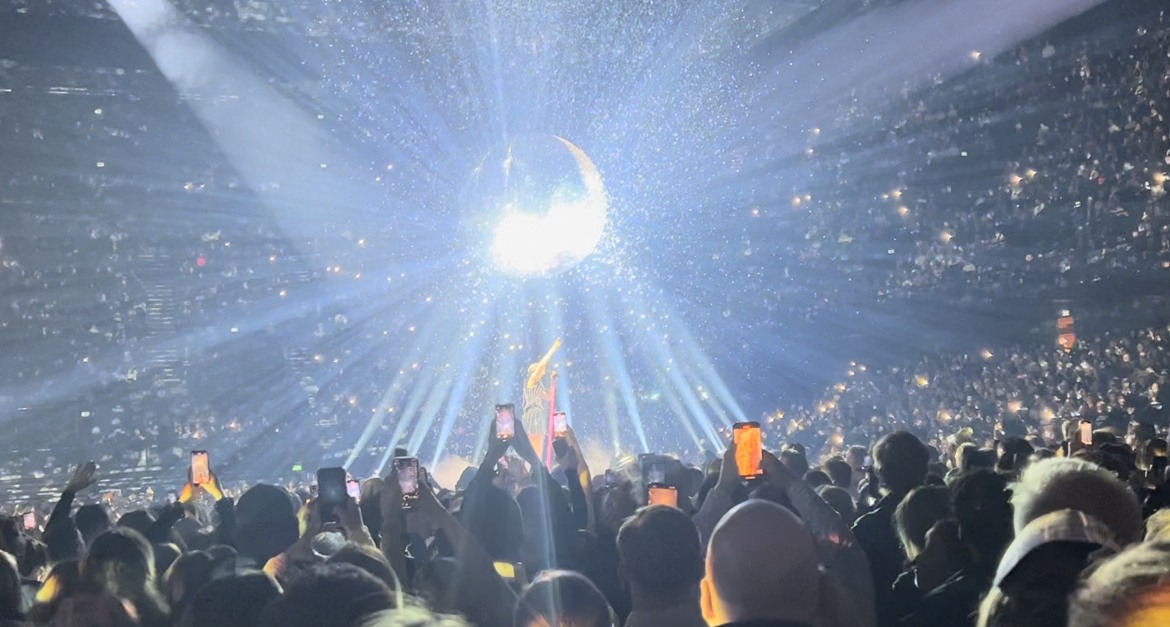
Dagny performing "Coast to Coast" at Oslo Spektrum on 11 November 2023

In June 2023, Dagny played at the 'Mighty Hoopla' festival in London. She supported Sting on his My Songs Tour, playing at Bedford Park in June 2023 and Cardiff Castle in July 2023.

In December 2023, Dagny played at Oslo Spektrum in her largest headline show to date. The show was sold out and featured Synne Vo as the opening act and Astrid S as a co-performer during the song "Pretty".

Her second studio album, Elle was released in June 2024. It contains 8 tracks including "Heartbreak in the Making" (which peaked at number 19 in Norway), "Same Again (For Love)", "Strawberry Dream", and "Ray-Bans."

She released the title track for her June 2026 album Dancefloor Erotica as a single in May 2026.

== Artistry ==
Dagny states her musical preference falls around "pop songs with a little bit of an indie, left of center vibe." and that her upbringing in northern Norway has influenced her approach to both music and life, being "tough on the outside but warmhearted on the inside."

Dagny stated that during the song writing process she asks herself: "What do I have to say? What do I have to tell?", saying that it is important for her songs to have meaning.

== Personal life ==
Before the COVID-19 pandemic, Dagny moved to Oslo, living with her sister and her sister's boyfriend, who is also her drummer.

On an AMA on Reddit, Dagny shared that she enjoys outdoor pursuits including swimming, hiking and bicycling, as well as vintage shopping, and that her favorite color is pink, reflected in the cover of her debut album Strangers / Lovers.

Dagny is a brand ambassador for the cosmetic company Clarins.

== Discography ==
Studio albums

- Strangers / Lovers (2020)
- Elle (2024)
- Dancefloor Erotica (2026)

== Tours ==
=== Headline tours ===
- Norway Tour (2019)
- Strangers/Lovers Tour (2021–2022)
- EU Tour (2024)

=== Supporting act ===
- Sting's Back to Bass Tour (Thailand, 2012)
- Elton John's Greatest Hits Tour (America, 2012)
- Bryan Adams's Reckless 30th Anniversary Tour 2014–2015 (Austria and Norway, 2014)
- The Coronas' Trust the Wire (Royal Hospital Kilmainham, Dublin, Ireland 2017)
- LANY's The LANY Tour: Part 2 (North America, 2017)
- Picture This (band)’s MDRN LV Tour 2019 (Dublin, Ireland, 2019)
- Sting's My Songs Tour (Bedford Park and Cardiff Castle, UK, 2023)
- Olly Murs' Mary Me Tour (Colchester Castle Park, UK, 2023)
- Justin Timberlake's JT Live 2025 (June 2 to July 8, 2025)

== Awards and nominations ==
Year	Award	Category	Recipient(s)	Result	Ref.
2017	Spellemannprisen 2016	Newcomer of the Year & Gramo Scholarship	Dagny	Nominated	
2017	Spellemannprisen 2016	Song of the Year	"Backbeat"	Nominated	
2018	Spellemannprisen 2017	Song of the Year	"Wearing Nothing"	Nominated	
2018	P3 Gull 2018	Song of the Year	"Drink About"	Nominated	
2019	Spellemannprisen 2018	Song of the Year	"Drink About"	Nominated	
2019	Spellemannprisen 2018	Songwriter of the Year	Dagny	Nominated	
2020	P3 Gull 2020	Artist of the Year	Dagny	Nominated	
2020	P3 Gull 2020	Song of the Year	"Somebody"	Won	
2021	Spellemannprisen 2020	Song of the Year	"Somebody"	Nominated	
2022	P3 Gull 2022	Song of the Year	"Pretty" (with Astrid S)	Nominated	
2023	P3 Gull 2023	Artist of the Year	Dagny	Nominated	
2024	P3 Gull 2024	P3 Prize (Note: No nominees were announced for this award.)	Dagny	Honoree	
2025	Spellemannprisen 2024	Pop	Elle	Nominated	
