= Simen Eriksrud =

- Born: Simen Matre Eriksrud; 12 November 1975 (age 51); Oslo, Norway
- Genres: EDM; tropical house
- Occupations: DJ; songwriter; record producer
- Instruments: Digital audio workstation; keyboards
- Years active: 2002–present
- Labels: UMG; Island; Universal Norway
- Member of: Seeb
- Website: seebmusic.com

Simen Matre Eriksrud (born 12 November 1975) is a Norwegian DJ, songwriter and record producer. He is best known as one half of the producing/songwriting duo Seeb, alongside Espen Berg, and a producer for several Norwegian artists. Simen is married to singer Simone Eriksrud.

He has produced Sie Gubba album Søndag e'det fæste, which was released in April 2002, and has been a songwriter and producer for Donkeyboy. He produced the song "Yes man", which was sung by Bjørn Johan Muri. He has also produced Ovi's "Playing with fire" and Maria Haukaas Storeng's on "Hold On Be Strong".
