= Strangers / Lovers =

Studio album by Dagny
- Released: 2 October 2020
- Recorded: 2019–2020
- Studio: Livingroom (Oslo, Norway)
- Genre: Synth-pop; electropop; dance-pop; disco
- Length: 37:18
- Label: Little Daggers
- Producer: Thomas Kongshavn; Rat City; ASV; Hank Solo; Cutfather; Jeppe London Bilsby; Jason Gill; Axxe; State; Richard Craker

Dagny chronology
Ultraviolet EP (2016)	Strangers / Lovers (2020)	Elle (2024)

Singles from Strangers / Lovers
- 1. "Come Over" Released: 7 February 2020; 2. "Somebody" Released: 1 May 2020; 3. "It's Only a Heartbreak" Released: 4 September 2020

Professional ratings
Review scores
Source	Rating
Auspop	5/5
Euphoria.	4/5 stars
The Independent	4/5 stars
The Line of Best Fit	9/10
musicOMH	4/5 stars

Strangers / Lovers is the debut studio album by Norwegian singer Dagny, released on 2 October 2020.

== Release ==
The album was divided into two halves. On 14 May 2020, Dagny announced that the first half, dubbed Side A, which included the first six tracks off the official album, would be released on 22 May 2020. The rest of the album was later released on 2 October 2020, along with Side A.

== Critical reception ==
In a positive review for The Line of Best Fit, Dan Cromb called Dagny "a true force to be reckoned with" thanks to Strangers / Lovers. Additionally, he praised the album sonically, calling it "powerful, punchy, effervescent pop music at its finest."

== Track listing ==
Strangers / Lovers track listing
No.	Title	Writer(s)	Producer(s)	Length
1.	"Come Over"	Sivert Hjeltnes Hagtvet; Viljar Losnegård; Anders Kjær; Dagny	Rat City; ASV^{[a]}	3:03
2.	"Somebody"	Lasse Michelsen; Kent Sundberg; Dagny; Cato Sundberg	Rat City; Thomas Kongshavn^{[a]}	3:14
3.	"Paris"	Dagny; Jesper Borgen; Hank Solo	Solo; Kongshavn^{[a]}	2:55
4.	"Let Me Cry"	Dagny; Cleo Tighe; Solo; Kongshavn	Solo; Kongshavn^{[a]}	3:19
5.	"Coulda Woulda Shoulda"	Dagny; Jeppe London Bilsby; Cutfather; Celine Svanbäck	Kongshavn; Cutfather; Bilsby	3:05
6.	"Tension"	Dagny; Rosi Golan; Caroline Pennell; Kyle Moorman; Kongshavn	Kongshavn	4:10
7.	"Moment"	Jon Eyden; Julia Karlsson; Jason Gill; Dagny	Kongshavn; Gill	2:45
8.	"Please Look at Me"	Emelie Hollow; Kongshavn; Axxe; Dagny	Kongshavn; Axxe	3:38
9.	"Bad at Love (Interlude)"	Ryan Hennessy; Harry Mead; Jimmy Rainsford; Dagny	Kongshavn	1:36
10.	"It's Only a Heartbreak"	Dagny; Cutfather; Bilsby; Svanbäck	Kongshavn; Cutfather; Bilsby	2:40
11.	"Bye Bye Baby"	Kris Eriemo; Omar Mohammed; Kristoffer Haugan; Edvard Normann; Dagny	State; Kongshavn	2:46
12.	"Coast to Coast"	Tobias Kuhn; Dagny	Kongshavn; Richard Craker	4:07
Total length:				37:18

Notes

- ^{^[a]} signifies a co-producer.

== Charts ==
Chart performance for Strangers / Lovers
Chart (2020)	Peak position
Norwegian Albums (VG-lista)	2
