= They Never Saw Me Coming =

Studio album by TQ
- Released: November 10, 1998 (US); May 8, 1999 (UK)
- Recorded: 1997–1998
- Genre: R&B
- Label: Sony, Epic
- Producer: TQ (executive producer); Mike Mosley; Jazze Pha; Femi Ojetunde Producer Ty Howard

TQ chronology
They Never Saw Me Coming (1998)	The Second Coming (2000)

They Never Saw Me Coming is the debut album by TQ released on November 10, 1998, in the United States and May 8, 1999, in the United Kingdom.

== History ==
=== Background ===
TQ wrote the entirety of They Never Saw Me Coming. The album was produced by Mike Mosley of Steady Mobbin Productions. TQ admired Mosley's studio work with Tupac Shakur and E-40. "Mike and I really like and respect each other," TQ acknowledged. "He's very serious about his work, like I am. By motivating each other, we both gave my project 110 percent."

"Bye Bye Baby", a Mosley/Ty Howard produced track, is based on a true story about a woman shot by a drive-by bullet meant for her man; it's followed by "The Comeback", a soul-searing track detailing the violent revenge wreaked on the shooter. "Darling Mary" is a playful ode to urban life's blunted reality; "When I Get Out", a pulsating ballad between TQ and Ericka Yancey, about an incarcerated brother's insecurity when it comes to his lover on the outside.

A horrifying drug-related incident from TQ's past was the source of "Remember Melinda"; "Gotta Make That Money" is a contemporary hustlers theme song, featuring a guest rap by E-40. "The bottom line," TQ states, "is that this album is about my life, the lives of the people that are close to me, and those that influenced me."

== Critical reception ==
Professional ratings
Review scores
Source	Rating
AllMusic	3/5 stars

The Los Angeles Times noted the "loopy poignancy" of "Westside", writing that TQ "has written what is perhaps the first power ballad to wax nostalgic about the West Coast gangsta rap movement."

=== Singles ===
Year	Title	Chart Positions								
Year	Title	US	UK	IRE	GER	SWI	AUT	NL	AUS	NZ
1998	"Westside"	12	4	5	8	29	14	3	10	10
1998	"Bye Bye Baby"	-	7	13	6	16	33	6	7	47
1999	"Better Days"	71	32	-	88	-	-	33	-	-

== Track listing ==
No.	Title	Length
1.	"Change (Intro)"	1.12
2.	"Westside"	5.04
3.	"If the World Was Mine"	3.32
4.	"Paradise"	3.39
5.	"They Never Saw Me Coming" (featuring Jay)	4.04
6.	"Don Breezio (Interlude)"	0.32
7.	"Gotta Make That Money" (featuring E-40)	4.35
8.	"I Get Around"	4.44
9.	"RememberMelinda"	4.34
10.	"One More Lick" (featuring Tray Deee)	4.31
11.	"Ass or Weed (Interlude)"	0.18
12.	"Darlin' Mary"	3.32
13.	"When I Get Out" (duet with Ericka Yancey)	5.27
14.	"Weed or Ass (Interlude)"	0.19
15.	"Your Sister" (featuring Too $hort)	4.07
16.	"Bye Bye Baby"	5.24
17.	"The Comeback" (featuring Tha Dogg Pound)	6.05
18.	"Better Days"	4.26

== Charts ==
=== Weekly charts ===
Chart (1998–99)	Peak position
Austrian Albums (Ö3 Austria)	50
Belgian Albums (Ultratop Flanders)	17
Dutch Albums (Album Top 100)	16
German Albums (Offizielle Top 100)	27
Swedish Albums (Sverigetopplistan)	59
Swiss Albums (Schweizer Hitparade)	45
UK Albums (OCC)	27
US Billboard 200	122
US Top R&B/Hip-Hop Albums (Billboard)	28

=== Year-end charts ===
Chart (1999)	Position
Belgian Albums (Ultratop Flanders)	78
Dutch Albums (Album Top 100)	70
German Albums (Offizielle Top 100)	97
