= Seeb (music producers) =

Norwegian electronic music group

- Also known as: SEEB; SeeB; Simen & Espen (former)
- Origin: Norway
- Genres: EDM; tropical house
- Years active: 2015–present
- Labels: UMG; Island; Universal Norway; Sky
- Members: Simen Eriksrud; Espen Berg
- Past members: Niklas Strandbråten

Seeb (sometimes stylized as SEEB or SeeB) is a Norwegian electronic music group made up of Simen Eriksrud and Espen Berg. Their name is made up of the initials (first letter of given name and surname) of the original duo.

== Career ==
=== Beginnings ===
Before adopting the name Seeb, Eriksrud and Berg worked together as producers and songwriters for several Norwegian acts including Bertine Zetlitz, D'Sound and Donkeyboy, mostly under the name Simen & Espen. They also produced and co-wrote a track on Kiesza's breakthrough album Sound of a Woman.

=== 2015–present: Breakthrough, Intro to Seeb and Nice to Meet You ===
The duo's major international success was for their remix of the song "I Took a Pill in Ibiza" by American singer Mike Posner. The remixed single was released on 24 July 2015. It topped the charts in the Netherlands, Norway, Ireland and the United Kingdom, and peaked within the top ten of the charts in Denmark, Finland, New Zealand, Sweden, Switzerland, and Posner's native United States.

Seeb released their debut single "Breathe" on 11 March 2016, featuring Portuguese singer Neev. "What Do You Love", featuring Jacob Banks, was released on 14 October 2016. Both songs are featured on their debut EP Intro to Seeb. On 3 March 2017, they released "Under Your Skin", a collaboration with American duo Rock City and Chloe Angelides. Featuring Greg Holden, "Boys in the Street" was released on 2 June 2017. "Rich Love", a collaboration with American pop rock band OneRepublic, was released on 14 July 2017. "Cruel World", a collaboration with Skip Marley, was released on 10 November 2017. They collaborated also with Ocean Park Standoff on the single "Lost Boys (Ocean Park Standoff vs Seeb)", released on 2 February 2018.

On 28 March 2018, the duo announced the release of their second EP Nice to Meet You, released on 20 April 2018. The lead single of their EP, titled "Drink About" and featuring Dagny, was released on 6 April 2018.

On 6 December 2018, Seeb released the single "Grip", a collaboration with Bastille.

On 4 April 2019, Seeb released 'Free To Go', featuring Ingrid Helene Håvik of Highasakite. Followed by 'Fade Out' released on 15 May 2019 featuring Olivia O'Brien. Seeb have since released tracks with Justin Jesso, Julie Bergan and American Authors, and remixed tracks for 5 Seconds of Summer and Charli XCX.

In February 2020 Seeb were nominated for the "Pop Group of the Year Award" at the Norwegian equivalent of the Grammy Awards, Spellemannprisen; however the Award Ceremony has been postponed due to the COVID-19 outbreak. They also remixed the song "Hallucinogenics" by Matt Maeson.

== Discography ==
- Sad in Scandinavia (2021)

== Awards and nominations ==
Year	Organization	Award	Work	Result	Ref.
2017	WDM Radio Awards	Best Remix	"I Took a Pill in Ibiza" by Mike Posner (SeeB Remix)	Won	
2017	NRJ Music Awards Norway	Best Norwegian Artist/Group Abroad	SeeB	Won	
2017	NRJ Music Awards Norway	Best Norwegian Artist/Group	SeeB	Nominated	
2017	Spellemann & Music Norway	Eksportprisen '16	Seeb	Won	
2017	MTV Europe Music Awards	Best Norwegian Act	Seeb	Nominated	
2017	2017 Remix Awards	Remix of the Year - Radio Airplay	"I Took a Pill in Ibiza" by Mike Posner (Seeb Remix)	Won	
2017	2017 Remix Awards	Remix Producer of the Year	Seeb	Nominated	
2018	Spellemann	Pop Group of the Year '17	Seeb	Won	
2019	Spellemann	Song of the Year '18	"Drink About" by Seeb and Dagny	Nominated	
2020	Spellemann	Pop Group of the Year '19	Seeb	Nominated	
2020	Spellemann	Song of the Year '20	"Kiss Somebody" by Julie Bergan and Seeb	Nominated	
