= Il était une fois =

Il était une fois is the French language equivalent of the stock phrase "Once upon a time".

== Film and television ==
- Once Upon a Time (1933 film), a French film
- Il était une fois..., a French educational animation franchise, created by Procidis. See Once Upon a Time... (franchise)
- Il était une fois la Mésopotamie, a 1998 French documentary film by Jean-Claude Lubtchansky
- Il était une fois l’indépendance, a 2009 Malian film
- Il était une fois Sabrina et Manu, a short film by Jean Pierre Lefebvre
- Il était une fois dans l'oued, a 2005 film by Amina Annabi

== Literature ==
- One of three sections in Bernard Werber's book Le miroir de Cassandre
- Il était une fois la Mésopotamie, an illustrated book by Jean Bottéro and Marie-Joseph Stève
- Il était une fois un enfant, a novel by Michel Tabachnik

== Music ==
- Il était une fois (band), a French band featuring the lead vocals of Joëlle Mogensen
  - Il était une fois, an album by band Il était une fois
- Il était une fois, a piece for voice and orchestra by André Caplet
- "Il était une fois nous deux", a song of Joe Dassin.

== Theater ==
- Il etait une fois, a play by Francis de Croisset

== See also ==
- Det var en gång (disambiguation)
- Once Upon a Time (disambiguation)
