= Det var en gång =

Det var en gång is the Norwegian language and Swedish language equivalence of the expression once upon a time.

Det var en gång may refer to:

- Det var en gang (film), 1994 Norwegian animated film directed by Ketil Jakobsen
- "Det var en gang" song by Mabelin during Melodi Grand Prix Junior 2002 competition
- "Det var en gång en fågel", song by Laser Inc on their album Roger That!
- "Ett gammalt fult och elakt troll det var en gång", also known in short title "Det var en gång", traditional Swedish children's song

== See also ==
- Il était une fois (disambiguation)
- Once Upon a Time (disambiguation)
