= Take Me Away (Tungevaag & Raaban and Victor Crone song) =

Single by Tungevaag & Raaban and Victor Crone
- Released: 19 July 2019
- Recorded: 2019
- Genre: Dance
- Length: 3:16
- Label: Warner Music Sweden
- Songwriter(s): Martin Tungevaag; Victor Crone; Marcus Svedin; Robbin Söderlund
- Producer(s): Tungevaag & Raaban; Marcus Svedin

Tungevaag & Raaban singles chronology
| "Try Again" (2019) | "Take Me Away" (2019) |

Victor Crone singles chronology
| "Discovery" (2019) | "Take Me Away" (2019) | "This Can't Be Love" (2019) |

"Take Me Away" is a song performed by dance music producer duo Tungevaag & Raaban and Swedish singer Victor Crone. The song was released as a digital download on 19 July 2019 by Warner Music Sweden. The song did not enter the Swedish Singles Chart, but peaked at number three on the Sweden Heatseeker Songs.

== Background ==
It's the second time Victor Crone has worked with Tungevaag & Raaban. In 2017, they released the single "Coming Up", the song did not enter the Swedish Singles Chart, but peaked at number two on the Sweden Heatseeker Songs. In an interview with Wiwibloggs, Victor said, "Marcus Svedin and I wrote this song when I was back in Sweden shortly after winning Eesti Laul. We wrote it with an acoustic guitar and wanted to create a positive vibe. We felt that Tungevaag & Raaban should produce it. "Take Me Away" is about getting away to the sea, to the mountains or to nature. In a nutshell, it is about living life to the fullest. We believe that it is a song that works both acoustically and for clubbing. I hope you enjoy it."

== Track listing ==
Digital download
| No. | Title | Length |
|---|---|---|
| 1. | "Take Me Away" | 3:16 |

== Charts ==
| Chart (2019) | Peak position |
|---|---|
| Sweden Heatseeker Songs (Sverigetopplistan) | 3 |

== Release history ==
| Region | Date | Format | Label |
|---|---|---|---|
| Estonia | 19 July 2019 | Digital download | Warner Music Sweden |
