= Tudo Outra Vez =

Promotional single by Rouge
- Released: 22 April 2013
- Recorded: 4 November 2012, Midas Estúdio
- Genre: Pop
- Length: 3:16
- Label: Midas Music
- Songwriters: Fantine Thó; Karin Hils
- Producer: Rick Bonadio

"Tudo Otra Vez" (lit.: "All again") is a song by the Brazilian girl group Rouge, released as a promotional single on April 22, 2013. The song, composed by members of the group, Fantine Thó and Karin Hils, and produced by Rick Bonadio, was the result of a meeting with the producer for his reality show Fábrica de Estrelas, from which also was born "Tudo É Rouge".

"Tudo Outra Vez" is a version of the song "No Feeling" by Luke Christopher. The song talks about everything the girls have faced in their careers, how good it is to meet again, and they would do it all over again. As well as "Tudo É Rouge", the song was only released as streaming on SoundCloud and had no digital release on iTunes, as the group was not released from its old label to market the name. A lyric video containing scenes of the audition of the girls in Popstars, was released.

== Background ==
I just spoke to Pati on the phone. We are very happy with all that is happening. Mainly because it's Rick who started the whole mess on Twitter."

— Aline Wirley talking about the possibility of returning the group.

After the group ended in 2006, the 4 girls followed their professional careers, but with a desire to finish the group in a "dignified" way. After years of fans requests in October 2012, it was speculated via Twitter that the girls' producer, Rick Bonadio, started a Twitter movement on the weekend with the hashtag #voltarouge (back rouge). The objective of Bonadio would be to present the fans with the commemoration of the 10 years of the feminine band with, perhaps, the recording of a DVD and a tour by Brazil. Rick Bonadio said that he talked to Karin first and after talking about the schedule and the coming of Fantine to Brazil for the recordings, all the girls loved the idea. Karin Hils said, "There was such a big demonstration on the internet that we started to think about this. It was this affection that clicked and made us think about the possibility. If it were just for us, it was not going to roll over It's a very big rush, but I'm loving it."

On November 3 and 4, 2012, the four girls got together at the Midas studio to compose and record two songs, "Tudo é Rouge" and "Tudo Se Vez". This process of recording and reuniting would be shown later in 2013 on the Bonadio reality show entitled Fábrica de Estrelas, and screened by Multishow. Luciana Andrade also received the invitation but did not accept. we received Rick's invitation for this return and we were very happy with the opportunity to relive and celebrate this story, "says Aline." It's an honor to know that we were part of the Brazilian pop, and the sensation is of go back in time, a second chance to work better, sing better, "said Fantine, who came from the Netherlands, where she currently lives with her husband and daughter, Cristine, for the recording.

== Composition ==
"Tudo Outra Vez" is a version of the song "No Feeling", composed by Luke Christopher, and was brought from Netherlands by Fantine. On the night of November 3, she and Karin made the version of the song, and showed Rick Bonadio, who produced it, a day later. As seen in the show, Fantine would sing the entire song, leaving the girls just as "backing vocals", but after Patricia's quest, they all got a part of the song. The song talks about the challenges faced by girls, how good it is to meet again, and that they would do it all over again.

The first stanza of the song is sung by Fantine, who sings, "We have gone through so many challenges, but from these ashes I will survive." While Patrícia sings the chorus, "But I do not give up I still want to be who I am, there's no such sensation." The second part is sung by Aline, "Sweaty body, closed time, head held high and feet on the ground." The singer still completes, "Good to meet you again," and Fantine completes, "I would do it all over again." Karin does not sing a single part, making second voice in some parts.

== Recording and Release ==
On the night of April 22, 2013, the song was released in full after the episode of Fábrica de Estrelas", which showed the process of songwriting and composition.

"The concern was so much that Fantine had availability, that Karin had availability, that the impression was that no one cared about my time, that I had a spectacle. So I was excluded."

— Patrícia Lissa inquiring about its "non participation" in the process of composition of the song.

In the episode, Fantine Thó and Karin Hils showed the composition to Rick, who agreed to record it. But during the recording of the song, Lissah Martins (who used to use the name Patricia) felt like expressing herself, since only Fantine would sing the song. "I'm feeling overmal, the feeling is that I'm not part of it." "How am I going to create something in this song, which I just heard?" Asked the singer, who did not participate in the song's composition. Before, Lissah had already stressed with Rick for not being able to participate in the creation of the song "Tudo É Rouge". The meeting to compose the song was marked on a day when she had a commitment from the musical Priscilla, the Queen of the Desert.

In her Facebook page, the singer decided to clarify the situation, writing a long text, saying:

"Rouge ALWAYS was a group of singers!!! "And that NEVER had a main!!!, This was always a very strong feature of the Rouge!!!, Before I said, NOBODY was going to sing a phrase!!!, they always sang all the songs!!!, Not even a phrase!!!, I said what they were all feeling but they did not want to talk!!!, So much that something that I said to Rick and that did not appear in the program, and I think that they should not have cut, was that I thought that ALL should sing at least ONE sentence!!!, Then they gave a sentence to Aline ... I was not the one who chose what I was going to sing !!! Anyway, we split the song together as I always did in all the songs!!!, Maybe I did not express myself well and because of this I was misunderstood ... I did everything for this recording to happen, I practically worked as a producer trying to reconcile the agenda of the 4, and everyone worried about the schedules of Fantine, of Karin, that were with more problems of agenda, but they forgot that u also had show !!! [...] I fought for what I believe !!! I believe the Rouge is a group of 4 singers, not a soloist and their backings... I admire and respect Rick's work as a producer, but 'Everything again' would only have the Rouge's face if ALL were singing that was ONE sentence !!! And if he did not agree with me, he would not have given up!!!"

== Critical reception ==
The song received positive reviews. For the site Gazeta do Povo, the song is "calmer and mellow" than "Tudo É Rouge", and more like hits like 'Um Anjo Veio Me Falar'." song has a "very nostalgic vibe," considering the song, "a super sincere little ballad composed by Fantine, who talks about everything they have lived through all the time, from the 'suffering' in search of a dream with Popstars, to the glory with the release of Rouge. "For him, the song" is more likely to please the fans, for resembling the success 'Um Anjo Veio Me Falar' (even without the intensity of it)." 98 FM radio also agreed that the song resembles "Um Anjo Veio Me Falar".

== Music video ==
=== Lyric Video ===
As in "Tudo é Rouge", the group also made available a song lyric video on the official YouTube channel. In it, images of the selection process that formed the group in 2002, from the first stages of the selection among thousands of girls, are shown until the day the members received the news that they were chosen. The video was a huge success (more than the one of "Tudo É Rouge"), reaching more than 310 thousand views.
