= Opening sentence =

First sentence of a literary work

The opening sentence or opening line stands at the beginning of a written work. The opening line is part or all of the opening sentence that may start the lead paragraph. For older texts the Latin term incipit ('it begins') is in use for the very first words of the opening sentence.

== Function ==
As in speech, a personal document such as a letter normally starts with a salutation; this, however, tends not to be the case in documents, published articles, essays, poetry, lyrics, general works of fiction and nonfiction. In nonfiction, the opening sentence generally points the reader to the subject under discussion directly in a matter-of-fact style. In journalism, the opening line typically sets out the scope of the article.

In fiction, authors have much liberty in the way they can cast the beginning. Techniques to hold the reader's attention include keeping the opening sentence to the point, showing attitude, shocking, and being controversial. One of the most famous opening lines, "It was the best of times, it was the worst of times", starts a sentence of 118 words that draws the reader in by its contradiction. Moby-Dick's "Call me Ishmael." is an example of a short opening sentence. The first sentence of the novel Yes contains 477 words. Formulaic openings are generally avoided, but expected in certain genres, such as fairy tales beginning "Once upon a time...".

== Satire ==
Inspired by the opening, "It was a dark and stormy night...", the annual tongue-in-cheek Bulwer-Lytton Fiction Contest invites entrants to compose "the opening sentence of the worst of all possible novels", and its derivative, the Lyttle Lytton Contest, for its equivalent in brevity.

== As title ==
The opening sentence may sometimes be also used as the title for the work; the Latin for this is incipit, meaning 'the first part' or 'the beginning'. In this way papal encyclicals and bulls are titled according to their incipits.
