= Alt I Sin Tid =

Studio album by Cir.Cuz
- Released: November 21, 2011
- Genre: Pop
- Length: 44:23
- Label: Cosmos Music Group

Cir.Cuz chronology
Alt I Sin Tid (2011)	Vi Er Cir.Cuz (2013)

Alt I Sin Tid (English: Everything in its Time) is the debut album from Norwegian pop duo Cir.Cuz (Mats Melbye and Thomas Pedersen). Work started on the album in mid-2011 and was released on 21 November 2011. The released of the album was preceded by the release of three singles from the album: "Radio" (released on 28 February 2011), "Den Eneste" (released on 6 July 2011), and "Diva" (released on 17 October 2011). Their debut single, "Radio", reached number 2 the Norwegian VG-lista charts. Their third single, "Diva", entered the Norwegian VG-lista charts at number 20.

== Track listing ==
1. "Radio" (3:20)
2. "Ubetalt" (3:37)
3. "Diva" (3:09)
4. "En Vei" (3:53)
5. "Den Eneste" (3:45)
6. "Skinner Alene" (4:14)
7. "Slu & Sleip" (3:41)
8. "Soldat I Regnet" (3:33)
9. "Interessert" (3:25)
10. "Bambi" (4:35)
11. "Business" (3:20)
12. "Frelser" (3:50)
