= It was a dark and stormy night =

Often-mocked story-opening phrase

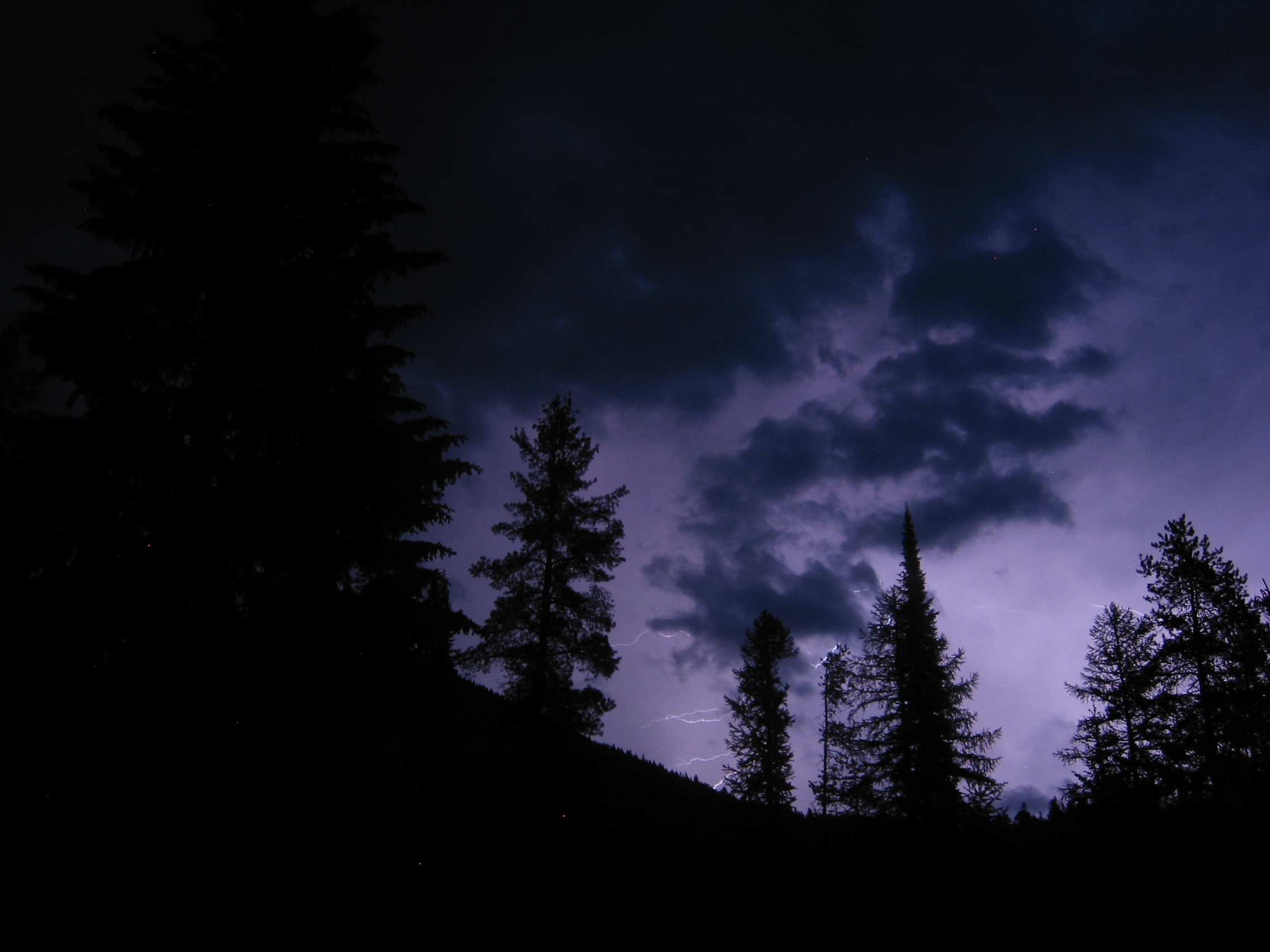
A dark and stormy night in Glacier National Park, Montana

"It was a dark and stormy night" is an often-mocked and parodied phrase considered to represent "the archetypal example of a florid, melodramatic style of fiction writing", also known as purple prose.

== Origin ==
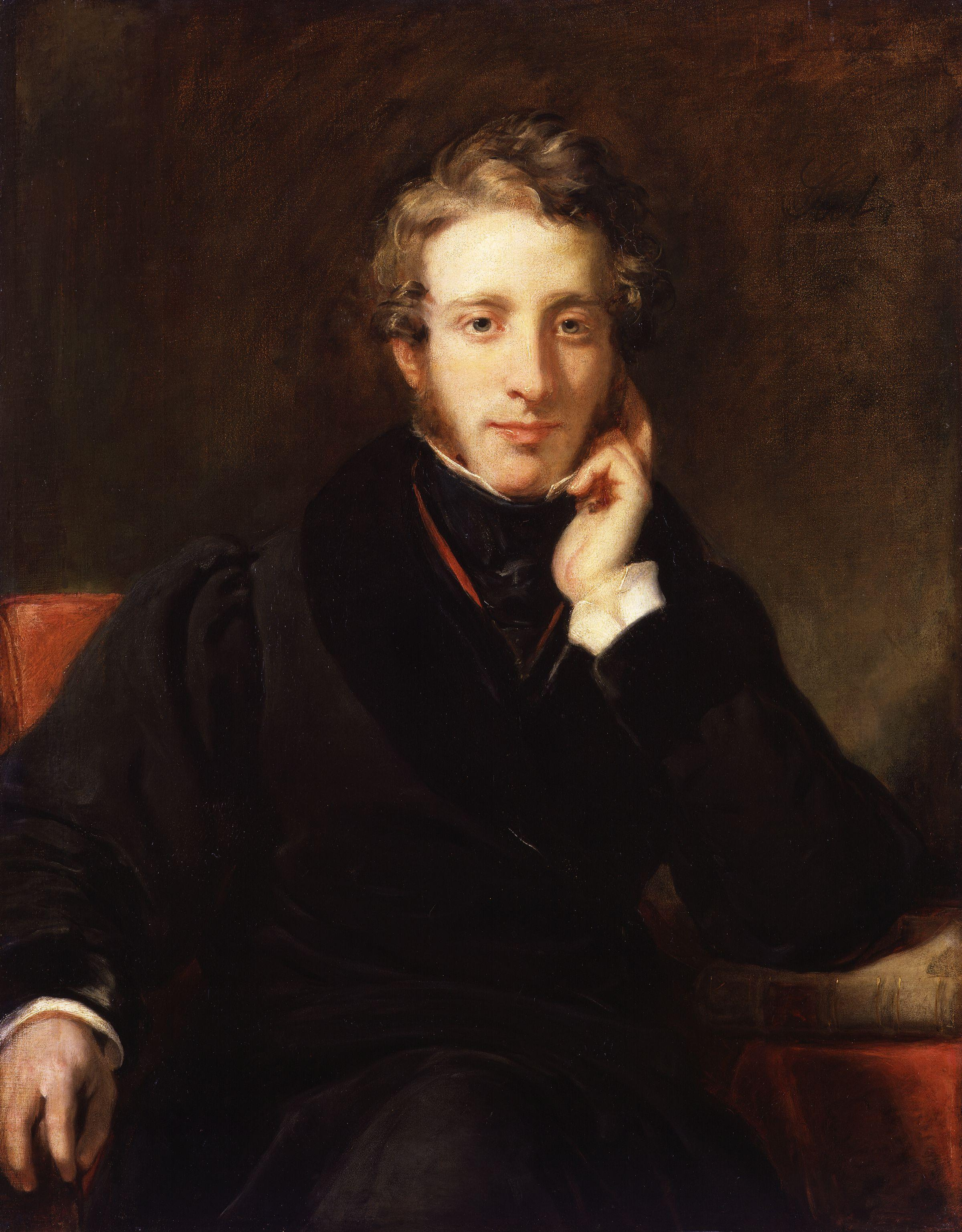
Portrait of Edward Bulwer-Lytton by Henry William Pickersgill, 1831

The status of the sentence as an archetype for bad writing comes from the first phrase of the opening sentence of English novelist Edward Bulwer-Lytton's 1830 novel Paul Clifford:

It was a dark and stormy night; the rain fell in torrents—except at occasional intervals, when it was checked by a violent gust of wind that swept up the streets (for it is in London that our scene lies), rattling along the housetops, and fiercely agitating the scanty flame of the lamps that struggled against the darkness.

The opening phrase had been in existence before Bulwer-Lytton employed it, appearing in the journal of the Doddington shipwreck that was published in 1757.

== Evaluations of the opening sentence ==
Writer's Digest described this sentence as "the literary poster child for bad story starters". On the other hand, the American Book Review ranked it as No. 22 on its "Best first lines from novels" list.

In 2008, Henry Lytton Cobbold, a descendant of Bulwer-Lytton, participated in a debate in the town of Lytton, British Columbia, with Scott Rice, the founder of the International Bulwer-Lytton Fiction Contest. Rice accused Bulwer-Lytton of writing "27 novels whose perfervid turgidity I intend to expose, denude, and generally make visible." Lytton Cobbold defended his ancestor, noting that he had coined many other phrases widely used today such as "the pen is mightier than the sword", "the great unwashed", and "the almighty dollar". He said that it was "rather unfair that Professor Rice decided to name the competition after him for entirely the wrong reasons." The phrase "the almighty dollar", however, had been used earlier by Washington Irving.

== Later usage ==
=== Literature ===
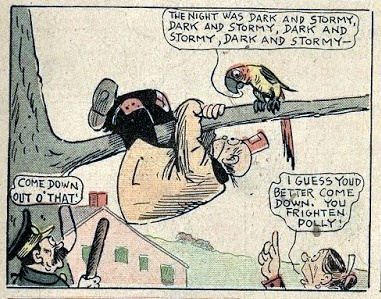
In a 1909 Happy Hooligan strip, a parrot repeats the phrase, to the titular character's annoyance.

The Peanuts comic strip character Snoopy, in his imagined persona as the World Famous Author, sometimes begins his novels with the phrase "It was a dark and stormy night." Cartoonist Charles Schulz made Snoopy use this phrase because "it was a cliché, and had been one for a very long time". A book by Schulz, titled Snoopy and "It Was a Dark and Stormy Night" includes a novel credited to Snoopy as author, was published by Holt, Rinehart, and Winston in 1971.

Chapter 28 of Alexandre Dumas' novel, The Three Musketeers (Les Trois Mousquetaires, 1844) begins with the phrase: "C'était une nuit orageuse et sombre... (It was a stormy and dark night...)

John Greenleaf Whittier's 1847 poem "Barclay of Ury" contains the line: Through this dark and stormy night / Faith beholds a feeble light.

It is the opening sentence of the 1962 novel A Wrinkle in Time by Madeleine L'Engle. L'Engle biographer Leonard Marcus notes that "With a wink to the reader, she chose for the opening line of A Wrinkle in Time, her most audaciously original work of fiction, that hoariest of clichés ... L'Engle herself was certainly aware of old warhorse's literary provenance as ... Edward Bulwer-Lytton's much maligned much parodied repository of Victorian purple prose, Paul Clifford." While discussing the importance of establishing the tone of voice at the beginning of fiction, Judy Morris notes that L'Engle's A Wrinkle in Time opens with "Snoopy's signature phrase".

Janet and Allan Ahlberg wrote a book titled It Was a Dark and Stormy Night (1993) in which a kidnapped boy must keep his captors entertained with his storytelling.

=== Recursive version ===
There are a variety of recursive stories based on the quote where one character tells another character a story, which itself begins with the same opening line. An example would be "It was a dark and stormy night and the Captain said to the mate, Tell us a story mate, and this is the story. It was a dark and stormy night......etc" The stories often feature a character named Antonio, and they have been in existence since at least 1900.

=== Music ===
Kerry Turner wrote "Twas a Dark and Stormy Night (Op. 12)," in 1987, based on this sentence.

Joni Mitchell's song "Crazy Cries of Love" on her album Taming the Tiger (1998) opens with "It was a dark and stormy night". In the December 1998 issue of Musician, Mitchell discusses her idea of using several cliche lines in the lyrics of multiple songs on the album, such as "the old man is snoring" in the title song "Taming the Tiger". Her co-lyricist, Don Fried, had read of a competition in The New Yorker to write a story opening with "It was a dark and stormy night" and was inspired to put it in the lyrics of "Crazy Cries of Love". Mitchell states:

But the second line is a brilliant deviation from the cliché: "Everyone was at the wing-ding." It's a beautiful out, but that was because it was competition to dig yourself out of a cliché hole in an original way. He never sent it in to The New Yorker, but he just did it as an original exercise.

=== Television ===
In the second season of the television series Star Trek: The Next Generation, the twelfth episode "The Royale" features Enterprise crewmembers trapped in a strange hotel on a planet otherwise incapable of supporting human life. In a hotel room, they find the corpse of an astronaut along with a pulp novel entitled Hotel Royale that begins "It was a dark and stormy night..." and containing many other clichés. As the sole survivor of an accidental contamination of his starship by an unknown alien race, the aliens took pity on him and created Hotel Royale for him, thinking the novel's story described the human way of life, whereas the astronaut found it unbearable due to the story's poor quality.

A similar Norwegian version of the phrase called "Det er en mørk og stormfull aften" (English translation: "It is a dark and stormy evening") is spoken by the narrator in the beginning of every episode of the comedy-adventure series The Julekalender (1994).

=== Board game ===
In the board game It Was a Dark and Stormy Night, players are given first lines of various famous novels and must guess their origin. Originally sold independently in bookstores in the Chicago area, it was later picked up by the website Goodreadsgames.com.

=== Writing contest ===
The annual Bulwer-Lytton Fiction Contest was formed in 1982. The contest, sponsored by the English Department at San Jose State University, recognizes the worst examples of "dark and stormy night" writing. It challenges entrants to compose "the opening sentence to the worst of all possible novels." The best of the resulting entries have been published in a series of paperback books, starting with It Was a Dark and Stormy Night in 1984.

== See also ==
- Once upon a time
