= Emila (singer) =

Norwegian singer

Karoline Staalesen Larsen better known as Emila is a Norwegian singer.

== Discography ==
=== Singles as featured artist ===
Title	Year	Peak positions						Certifications
Title	Year	NOR	AUT	DEN	FIN	GER	SWE	Certifications
"Samsara 2015" (Martin Tungevaag featuring Emila)	2014	2	7	8	1	—	4	IFPI NOR: 4× Platinum
"Samsara" (Tungevaag & Raaban featuring Emila)	2015	—	—	—	—	60	—	
"Original" (Cir.Cuz featuring Emila)	2015	28	—	—	—	—	—	IFPI NOR: Platinum
"—" denotes a single that did not chart or was not released.
