= Wicked Wonderland =

Wicked Wonderland may refer to:

- Wicked Wonderland (album), 2009 studio album by American rock-musician Lita Ford
- "Wicked Wonderland" (song), 2014 song by Norwegian DJ and producer Martin Tungevaag
- Descendants: Wicked Wonderland, 2026 film
