= Vi Er Cir.Cuz =

Studio album by Cir.Cuz
- Released: November 8, 2013
- Genre: Pop
- Length: 36:45
- Label: Cosmos Music Group

Cir.Cuz chronology
Alt I Sin Tid (2011)	Vi Er Cir.Cuz (2013)

Vi Er Cir.Cuz (We Are Cir.Cuz) is the second album from Norwegian pop duo Cir.Cuz (Mats Melbye and Thomas Pedersen). Work started on the album in 2012 and was released on 8 November 2013. The release of the album was preceded by the release of three singles from the album: "Gatelys" (released on 28 May 2012), "Supernova" (released on 30 November 2012), and "Tidløs" (released on 29 April 2013). "Supernova" peaked at number 5 on the Norwegian Singles Chart.

== Track listing ==
1. Terningkast (featuring Byz) (4:39)
2. Tidløs (3:16)
3. Vi Er (3:48)
4. Over Meg (3:20)
5. Supernova (featuring Julie Bergan) (3:54)
6. Komplisert (3:20)
7. Usynlig (featuring Iselin Solheim) (3:23)
8. Gatelys (3:33)
9. Tornerose (3:49)
10. Skål (3:43)

== Certifications ==
Certifications for Vi Er Cir.Cuz
Region	Certification	Certified units/sales
Norway (IFPI Norway)	Gold	15,000^{‡}
^{‡} Sales+streaming figures based on certification alone.
