= Julie Bergan =

Norwegian singer and songwriter

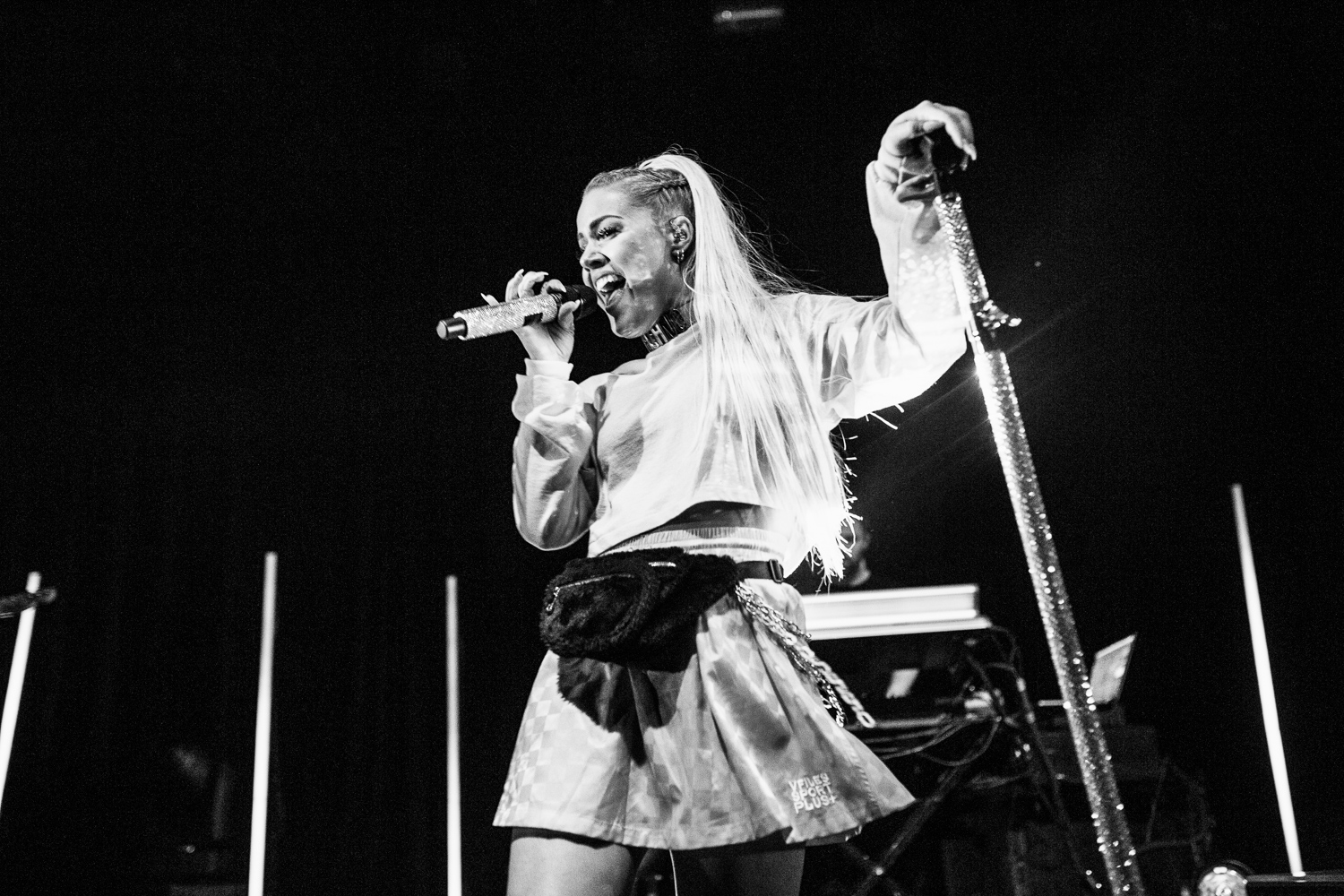
- Julie Bergan performing live at by:Larm 2017

Background information
- Born: 12 April 1994 (age 32); Skien, Norway
- Genres: Dance-pop; electronic; hip hop
- Occupations: Singer; songwriter
- Years active: 2012–present
- Label: Karate
- Website: juliebergan.no

Julie Bergan (born 12 April 1994) is a Norwegian singer and songwriter born in Skien, Norway. Bergan started releasing covers on YouTube at the age of 16, eventually signing a record deal with Warner Music Norway in 2013. In 2015 she attained mainstream success in Denmark and Germany with her single "All Hours", before breaking through in her native Norway in 2016 with "Arigato" peaking at number one. Bergan's major-label debut album Turn On the Light was released in 2018. She returned to the number one spot in 2018 on VG-lista after collaborating with K-391, Alan Walker and Seungri on "Ignite".

== Career ==
=== 2012–2016: Career beginnings, Melodi Grand Prix, "Younger" ===
In 2012 she recorded the song "Supernova" with Cir.Cuz, which peaked at number five on the Norwegian Singles Chart. She participated in Melodi Grand Prix 2013, the national selection for the Eurovision Song Contest 2013 with the song "Give a Little Something Back", which she wrote with Ben Adams and Sara Skjoldnes. She did not qualify from the semi-final in Steinkjer. In September 2013, she was signed by Warner Music Norway. In early 2014, she released her first single, "Younger".

=== 2016–2018: International breakthrough and Turn On the Lights ===
After the release of "Younger" Bergan released a number of songs, but it was after the release of her single "Arigato" she became known beyond Norway. The song reached number five on the Swedish singles chart, and was nominated at the Norwegian Grammys in 2016 for Song of the Year. On 13 January 2017, she released the second single from her debut album Blackout. On 9 June 2017, she released the third single "If You Love Me" featuring American rapper Tunji Ige, and on 5 November 2017 the fourth single "Incapable". On 26 January 2018, she released the fifth single from the album, "Guilt Trip". On 2 February 2018 she released her debut album Turn On the Lights. The album reached number one on the Norwegian VG-Lista chart. In March 2018 she performed her It's Lit Tour pt. I across Norway. On 11 May 2018, K-391 and Alan Walker released the single "Ignite" which featured Julie Bergan and Seungri, which peaked at number one on the Norwegian VG-Lista chart and at number thirteen on the Swedish singles chart. She performed with Walker at Coachella as a guest, and at EDC Japan Festival also as a guest during Walker's set. Later that year she went on her third tour, It's Lit Tour pt. II, in Norway, the UK, France and Sweden. She played at festivals in Norway and Sweden and in clubs in London and Paris. At the end of 2018 she released the single "U Got Me".

=== 2019–2022: Hard Feelings ===
On 1 March 2019, Bergan released "STFU", and on 15 March 2019 she appeared on the song "I'll Be Fine Somehow" by Benjamin Ingrosso. In March she presented the Spellmanprisen awards ceremony in Norway. In May "Don't Give Up on Me Now" was released together with R3hab, followed by the single "Outlaw", and in the middle of 2019 she embarked on the Hard Feelings tour, which took her across Europe.

On 3 January 2020, she released the single "Kiss Somebody" with SeeB, and in July 2020, in the middle of the COVID-19 lockdowns, Bergan released her new single "Commando". The title is her nickname, which she received from locals while on vacation. The music video for the song was stitched together from individual fan dance videos.

In July came her second collaboration with SeeB entitled "Don't You Wanna Play", the third followed in 2022 with "Always Will", the song was written by Mimi Webb, among others. In 2020 she released her second album Hard Feelings, parts of which she had previously released on two EPs, Hard Feelings: Ventricle 1 and Hard Feelings: Ventricle 2. The album is only available digitally. Part of this was the single "One Touch" that Bergan co-wrote with Dagny.

In mid-2021 she took part in the Norwegian Haik Show, where artists are presented and then give a concert. In November 2021, David Guetta released the song "Family", which was intended to show the cohesion of the music industry during the COVID-19 pandemic. Various singers from all over the world performed the vocals, and Bergan sang the Scandinavian version.

At the beginning of 2022, she and friends opened the Crewtrening gym in Oslo, where she now trains herself and also gives courses. At the Spellmannprisen 2022 she made her relationship with Yunus Daar public. The two had known each other for a long time.

In late 2022, Alan Walker wanted to release the song "Ritual" with Julie Bergan, which she also co-wrote, but a dispute ensued. Walker didn't want to share the rights to the song with her, so the song was released with different lyrics and singer. You can still see her in the music video.

=== 2023–2025: Diamonds Tour and Euronites EP ===
On 17 March 2023, her first new single for almost two years, "Diamonds", was released on her own label. Bergan had started her own label Karate Records after splitting from Warner Music. She also announced the Diamonds Tour in late 2023 and early 2024. On 26 May 2023, Bergan released the album's second single "Waste a Tear".

On 16 June 2023, she performed for the seventh time at the annual VG-Lista Topp 40 live show at City Hall Square in Oslo. There, she performed "Waste a Tear", which had been released three weeks earlier. The dance choreography was created by Mona Berntsen, who had previously worked with Justin Bieber and Alicia Keys, among others. On 29 September 2023, Bergan released the third single from the album, "Nobody Loves No One". On 13 October 2023, Bergan released the fourth single "Old Habits", which she first performed live during the Norwegian TV show Lindmo, hosted by Anne Lindmo. In winter 2023/24 she was on Diamonds Tour in norway.

On 23 February 2024, Bergan released the fifth single "Kiss Me Better". On 22 March 2024, Danish singer Medina and Bergan released the second version of Medina's song "Danser for mig selv". Bergan released EP with versions of „Kiss Me Better” on 29 March, 2024. On 24 April 2024, Bergan released the sixth single "Eternity Tonight".

On 23 January 2025, Julie Bergan announced release of her EP Euronites The main genre of EP is Eurodance, which was released on 21 February 2025.

On 19th September 2025, Julie Bergan released her single „Make Myself Happy”.

On 31st October 2025, Ruben and Julie Bergan released their single „Det går bra” which achieved 11th position at Norwegian Charts.

In 2026 Julie Bergan is performing at Norwegian festivals.

== Discography ==
=== Albums ===
Title	Details	Peak chart positions
Title	Details	NOR
Turn On the Lights	Released: 2 February 2018; Label: Warner Music Norway; Formats: Digital download, CD, streaming	5
Hard Feelings	Released: 11 December 2020; Label: Warner Music Norway; Formats: Digital download, streaming	—
"—" denotes an album that did not chart or was not released in that territory.

=== Extended plays ===
Title	Details
Hard Feelings: Ventricle 1	Released: 18 October 2019; Label: Warner Music Norway; Formats: Digital download, streaming
Hard Feelings: Ventricle 2	Released: 11 September 2020; Label: Warner Music Norway; Formats: Digital download, streaming
Euronites	Released: 21 February 2025; Label: Karate Records; Formats: Digital download, streaming

=== Singles ===
==== As lead artist ====
Title	Year	Peak chart positions		Certifications	Album
Title	Year	NOR	SWE	Certifications	Album
"Give a Little Something Back"	2013	—	—		Non-album singles
"Younger"	2014	—	—	IFPI NOR: Gold	Non-album singles
"Fire"	2014	—	—		Non-album singles
"All Hours"	2015	6	—	IFPI NOR: 2x Platinum	Non-album singles
"I Kinda Like It"	2016	35	—	IFPI NOR: Gold	Non-album singles
"Arigato"	2016	1	5	IFPI NOR: 3x Platinum	Turn On the Lights
"Blackout"	2017	17	—	IFPI NOR: Gold	Turn On the Lights
"If You Love Me" (featuring Tunji Ige)	2017	—	—		Turn On the Lights
"Incapable"	2017	19	—		Turn On the Lights
"Guilt Trip"	2018	18	—		Turn On the Lights
"U Got Me"	2018	20	—	IFPI NOR: Gold	Non-album singles
"STFU"	2019	20	—	IFPI NOR: Platinum	Non-album singles
"Don't Give Up on Me Now" (with R3hab)	2019	—	—		Non-album singles
"Outlaw"	2019	—	—		Non-album singles
"Crazy Enough"	2019	35	—	IFPI NOR: Gold	Hard Feelings: Ventricle 1
"Kiss Somebody" (with Seeb)	2020	12	— (Note: "Kiss Somebody" did not enter the Swedish Singellista Chart, but peaked at number one on the Swedish Heatseeker Chart.)	IFPI NOR: Platinum	Hard Feelings: Ventricle 2
"Don't You Wanna Play?" (with Seeb)	2020	—	—		Sad in Scandinavia (Part 1)
"One Touch"	2020	39	—		Hard Feelings: Ventricle 2
"Second Hand Love" (featuring Ruben)	2021	32	—		Non-album singles
"Diamonds"	2023	—	—		Non-album singles
"Waste a Tear"	2023	—	—		Non-album singles
"Nobody Loves No One"	2023	—	—		Non-album singles
"Old Habits"	2023	—	—		Non-album singles
"Kiss Me Better"	2024	—	—		Euronites
"Eternity Tonight"	2024	—	—		Euronites
"Iconic" (featuring Raaban)	2024	—	—		Euronites
"Dive"	2024	—	—		Euronites
"Get It Together"	2024	—	—		Euronites
"Make Myself Happy"	2025	—	—		Non-album singles
"Det går bra" (with Ruben)	2025	11	—		Non-album singles
"Min bydel"	2026	83	—		Non-album singles
"—" denotes a single that did not chart or was not released in that territory.

==== As featured artist ====
Title	Year	Peak chart positions			Certifications	Album
Title	Year	NOR	FIN	SWE	Certifications	Album
"Supernova" (Cir.Cuz featuring Julie Bergan)	2012	5	—	—	IFPI NOR: 14× Platinum	Vi Er Cir.Cuz
"Can't Help Myself" (Clairmont featuring Mugisho and Julie Bergan)	2017	—	—	—		Non-album single
"Ignite" (K-391 featuring Alan Walker, Julie Bergan and Seungri)	2018	1	5	13	IFPI NOR: 4x Platinum	Non-album single
"I'll Be Fine Somehow" (Benjamin Ingrosso featuring Julie Bergan)	2019	—	—	—		Spotify Singles
"Flexy" (DJ Lizzy Wang featuring Julie Bergan)	2021	—	—	—		Non-album singles
"Always Will" (SeeB featuring Julie Bergan)	2022	—	—	—		Non-album singles
"Danser for mig selv" (Medina featuring Julie Bergan)	2024	—	—	—		Non-album singles
"—" denotes a single that did not chart or was not released in that territory.

== Awards and nominations ==
Year	Organization	Award	Work	Result
2014	NRJ Awards Norway	Artist of the Year	Julie Bergan	Won
2016	MTV Europe Music Awards	Best Norwegian Act	Julie Bergan	Nominated
2016	P3 Gull	Årets Nykommer (Newcomer of the Year)	Julie Bergan	Nominated
2016	P3 Gull	Årets Låt (Song of the Year)	"Arigato"	Nominated
2017	Spellemannprisen '16	Årets Låt (Song of the Year)	"Arigato"	Nominated
2017	Musikkforleggerprisen (Norwegian songwriters association)	Årets Gjennombrudd (Breakthrough Artist)	"Arigato"	Won
2019	Spellemannprisen '18	Årets Låt (Song of the Year)	"Ignite" (with K-391, Alan Walker and Seungri)	Nominated
2019	NRJ Awards Norway	Song of the Year	"STFU"	Won
2020	Spellemannprisen '20	Årets Låt (Song of the Year)	"Kiss Somebody" (with SeeB)	Nominated

== Concert tours ==
Headlining

- Arigato Tour (2016)
- It's Lit Tour (2018)
- Hard Feelings Tour (2019–2020)
- Diamonds Tour (2023–2024)

Supporting

- Justin Bieber — Purpose World Tour (2016)
- Dua Lipa — The Self-Titled Tour (2018)
- Alan Walker — Avation Tour (2019–20)
- Alan Walker — Walkerverse Tour (2022)
