= BLFC =

BLFC may refer to:

- Badak Lampung F.C., Indonesia
- Badshot Lea F.C., England
- Biggest Little Fur Con, a furry convention in Reno, Nevada
- Black Leopards F.C., South Africa
- Boston Legacy FC, United States
- Bulwer-Lytton Fiction Contest
