= Samsara 2015 =

2014 single by Tungevaag & Raaban

Single by Martin Tungevaag
- Released: November 2014
- Recorded: 2014
- Genre: Melbourne bounce; Electro house; progressive house
- Length: 3:31
- Label: Sony Music Entertainment Norway AS.
- Songwriters: Martin Tungevaag, Karoline Staalesen Larsen, Magnus Hagen Clausen
- Producers: Martin Tungevaag; Robbin Söderlund

Martin Tungevaag singles chronology
| "Vidorra" (2014) | "Samsara 2015" (2014) | "Nissemor og meg" (2015) |

"Samsara 2015"

Single by Martin Tungevaag featuring Emila
- Released: October 2014
- Recorded: 2014
- Genre: Melbourne bounce; Electro house; progressive house
- Length: 3:31
- Label: Sony Music Entertainment Norway AS.
- Songwriters: Martin Tungevaag, Karoline Staalesen Larsen, Magnus Hagen Clausen
- Producers: Martin Tungevaag; Robbin Söderlund

"Samsara"

Single by Tungevaag & Raaban featuring Emila
- Released: 13 February 2015
- Recorded: 2014
- Genre: Melbourne bounce; Electro house; progressive house
- Length: 3:31
- Label: Sony Music Entertainment Norway AS.
- Songwriters: Martin Tungevaag, Karoline Staalesen Larsen, Magnus Hagen Clausen
- Producers: Martin Tungevaag; Robbin Söderlund

Tungevaag & Raaban featuring Emila singles chronology
| "Samsara" (2015) | "Parade 2015" (2015) |

"Samsara 2015" is the 2014 single by the Norwegian and Swedish dance music producer duo Tungevaag & Raaban. It became a hit in Scandinavian charts including Norway, Sweden and Denmark. The Norwegian hit version featured the vocals of Norwegian singer Emila that was released again charting in its own right again in VG-lista, the Norwegian Singles Chart and in Finland.

== Awards and nominations ==
The single was nominated for "Best Hit" category during 2014 Spellemannprisen in Norway but lost to "Engel" by Admiral P featuring Nico D.

== Charts ==
=== Weekly charts ===
| Chart (2014–2015) | Peak position |
|---|---|
| Austria (Ö3 Austria Top 40) | 7 |
| Denmark (Tracklisten) | 8 |
| Finland (Suomen virallinen lista) | 1 |
| Norway (VG-lista) | 2 |
| Sweden (Sverigetopplistan) | 4 |

=== Year-end charts ===
| Chart (2015) | Position |
|---|---|
| Austria (Ö3 Austria Top 40) | 29 |
| Denmark (Tracklisten) | 39 |
| Sweden (Sverigetopplistan) | 33 |

== Certifications ==
| Region | Certification | Certified units/sales |
|---|---|---|
| Austria (IFPI Austria) | Platinum | 30,000^{‡} |
| Denmark (IFPI Danmark) | Platinum | 60,000^{^} |
| Italy (FIMI) | Gold | 25,000^{‡} |
| Norway (IFPI Norway) | 4× Platinum | 160,000^{‡} |
| Poland (ZPAV) | Platinum | 20,000^{‡} |
Streaming
| Sweden (GLF) | 3× Platinum | 24,000,000^{†} |
^{^} Shipments figures based on certification alone.^{‡} Sales+streaming figures based on certification alone.^{†} Streaming-only figures based on certification alone.
