= Paul Clifford =

1830 novel by Edward Bulwer-Lytton

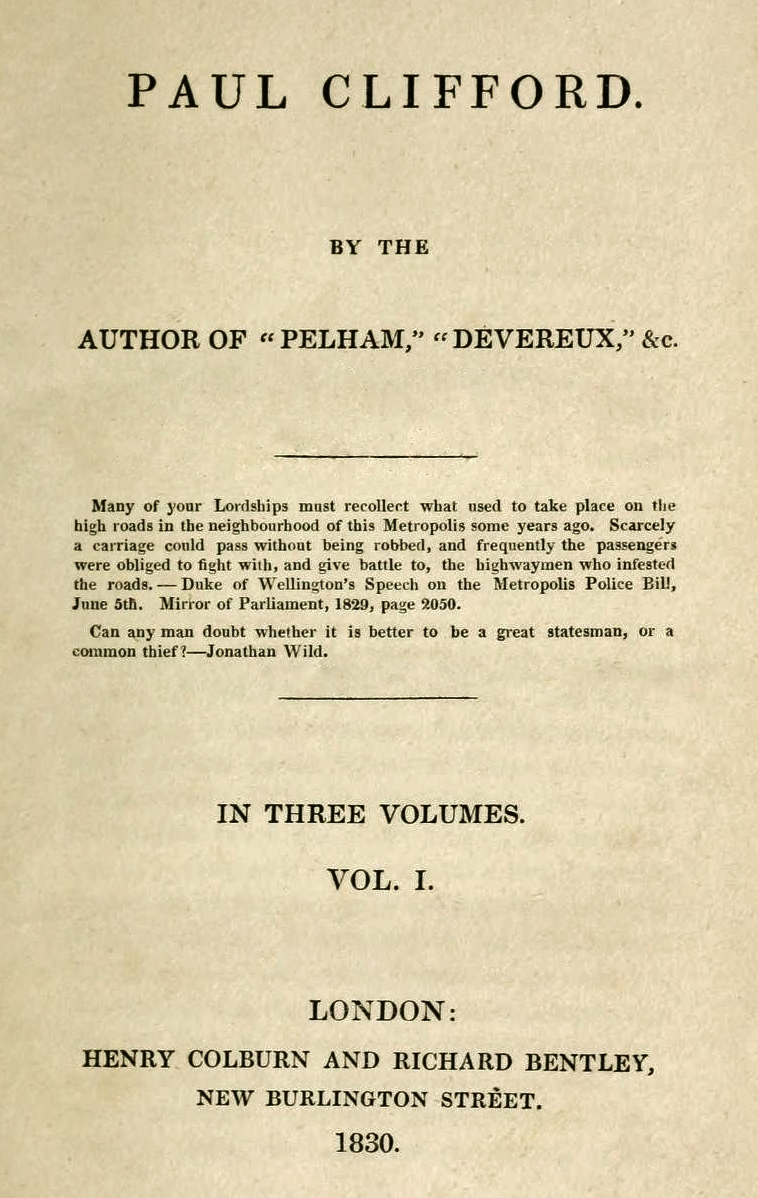
- First edition title page
- Author: Edward Bulwer-Lytton
- Language: English
- Genre: novel
- Publisher: Henry Colburn; Richard Bentley
- Publication date: 1830
- Publication place: United Kingdom
- Media type: Print (hardback and paperback)
- Pages: 965
- Text: Paul Clifford at Wikisource

Paul Clifford is a novel published in 1830 by English author Edward Bulwer-Lytton. It tells the life of Paul Clifford, a man who leads a dual life as both a criminal and an upscale gentleman. The book was successful upon its release. It is best known for its opening phrase "It was a dark and stormy night...", which helped inspire the Bulwer-Lytton Fiction Contest. It is an early example of the Newgate novel.

== Plot ==
Paul Clifford tells the story of a chivalrous highwayman in the time of the French Revolution. Brought up not knowing his origins, he falls in with a gang of highwaymen. While disguised as a gentleman for the purposes of a confidence trick, he meets and falls in love with Lucy Brandon. Clifford is arrested for a highway robbery and brought before her uncle, Judge Brandon, for trial, where it is unexpectedly revealed that Clifford is Brandon's son.

That revelation complicates the trial, but Clifford is convicted and Judge Brandon condemns him to death. The sentence is commuted to transportation. Clifford escapes from the penal colony, and he and Lucy make their way to the United States together.

== Famous first words ==
Although Paul Clifford is rarely read today, it contains one of the most widely known incipits in English literary history: "It was a dark and stormy night…". It is frequently invoked for its atmospheric and neo-Gothic description, often in the mystery, detective, horror and thriller genres. Because of its Romantic qualities, it has likewise become a textbook example of purple prose.

"It was a dark and stormy night" is only the beginning of the full first sentence:

It was a dark and stormy night; the rain fell in torrents—except at occasional intervals, when it was checked by a violent gust of wind which swept up the streets (for it is in London that our scene lies), rattling along the housetops, and fiercely agitating the scanty flame of the lamps that struggled against the darkness.

== See also ==
- Weir of Hermiston (R. L. Stevenson's unfinished novel which was to have a similar plot)
