= Raaban =

Swedish DJ and music producer (born 1987)

- Born: Robbin Söderlund; 30 April 1987 (age 39); Borås, Sweden
- Genre: Eurodance
- Occupation: music producer
- Label: Sony Music
- Formerly of: Tungevaag & Raaban; Laser Inc

Robbin Söderlund (born 30 April 1987), better known by his artistic name Raaban, is a Swedish DJ and music producer. He was also part of the production duo Tungevaag & Raaban alongside Norwegian DJ/producer Martin Tungevaag until they split in late 2019.

== Career ==
Born in Borås, Sweden, Raaban started his career as producer and DJ of Laser Inc, a two-person Swedish Eurodance band made up of singer-songwriter Jonas on vocals and Robbin Söderlund as DJ and producer. For some time the band also included Izko (Chainkickerz). The band's single "Det var en gång en fågel" became a hit in Sweden and Finland in the summer of 2007, reaching number six on the Swedish charts with a 15-week run. It also reached number 11 on the Finnish charts. Based on the chart success, Laser Inc released the 12-track album Roger That! on 4 May 2009 under the Warner Music Sweden Label.

After Laser Inc, Robbin Söderlund has continued to produce tracks for a wide range of purposes, including music for international recognized brands, various productions of Swedish Idol television show and a great number of artists like Swedish singer of Lebanese origin Rabih Jaber in a club version of "Grenade", "Millionaire" and "Don't Wanna Wake Up", the Universal Music Japan signed singer Yuka Masaki as well as the Swedish house duo Stockholm Syndrome singles "Pretty Girl" and "Karma". He has also produced a lot of remixes, an own EP named One of a Kind released on Disco:Wax 2011 containing collaborations with Alex and Rabih Jaber. He has produced under alias names such as 'Brilliant' and 'Dunk Dunk'.

In 2015 he became part of the DJ/music production duo Tungevaag & Raaban. Tungevaag & Raaban is today signed by Sony Music and "Samsara" was their first single as a duo.

== Discography ==
=== Albums ===
as part of Laser Inc

- 2009: Roger That!

=== EPs ===
as Raaban

- 2011: One of a Kind (EP)

=== Singles ===
as Laser Inc

- 2007: "Det var en gång en fågel"

As Tungevaag & Raaban

(For detailed listing, refer to Refer to discography on Tungevaag & Raaban)

- 2015: "Samsara" (featuring Emila)
- 2015: "Parade"
- 2015: "Russian Roulette" (with Charlie Who?)
- 2016: "Wolf"
- 2016: "Magical"
- 2016: "Stay Awake" (feat. VENIOR)
- 2017: "Wake Up Alone" (feat. Clara Mae)
- 2017: "Cold Blood" (feat. Jeffrey James)
- 2017: "Coming Up" (feat. Victor Crone)
- 2017: "Beside Me" (with Tom Swoon)
- 2018: "All For Love"
- 2019: "Take Me Away" (feat. Victor Crone)

Others

- 2010: Raaban and Evana – "Realize" (Single and Remixes)
- 2011: Raaban feat. Rabih – "Grenade"
- 2021: MOTi X Raaban – "One Day"

Productions

- 2011: Rabih Jaber – "Millionaire" (Produced by Raaban)
- 2011: Yuka Masaki – "Lady Luck"
- 2012: Stockholm Syndrome – "Pretty Girl"
- 2013: Stockholm Syndrome – "Karma"
