= Cir.Cuz =

Norwegian musical duo

- Origin: Norway
- Genres: Hip-hop; pop
- Years active: 2011-present
- Label: Cosmos Music Group
- Members: Mats Melbye; Thomas Pedersen
- Website: www.circuz.no

Cir.Cuz is a Norwegian pop duo consisting of Mats Melbye from Sarpsborg and Thomas Pedersen from Skien. Their debut single "Radio" peaked at number 2 on the Norwegian Singles Chart.

== Music career ==
The duo released their debut single "Radio" on 28 February 2011, which reached number 2 the Norwegian VG-lista charts. They began working on an album in mid-2011. They released their second single "Den Eneste" on 6 July 2011. On 17 October 2011 they released "Diva" as their third single, it entered the Norwegian VG-lista charts at number 20. They released their debut album Alt I Sin Tid on 21 November 2011.

On 28 May 2012 they released the single "Gatelys". On 30 November 2012 they released the single "Supernova" featuring vocals from Julie Bergan, which reached number 5 on the Norwegian VG-lista charts. On 29 April 2013 they released "Tidløs". The album, Vi Er Cir.Cuz, was released on 8 November 2013.

In 2015, they had chart success with the single "Original" featuring additional vocals by Emila as a prelude to their third album Hjertet mitt slår.

== Discography ==
=== Albums ===
Title	Details	Peak chart positions	Certifications
Title	Details	NOR	Certifications
Alt I Sin Tid	Released: 21 November 2011; Label: Cosmos Music Group; Formats: CD, digital download	—	
Vi Er Cir.Cuz	Released: 8 November 2013; Label: Cosmos Music Group; Formats: CD, digital download	39	IFPI NOR: Gold
Hjertet mitt slår	Released: 1 May 2015; Label: Cosmos Music Group; Formats: CD, digital download	–	
"—" denotes an album that did not chart or was not released.

=== Singles ===
==== As lead artists ====
Title	Year	Chart Positions	Certifications	Album
Title	Year	NOR	Certifications	Album
"Radio"	2011	2	IFPI NOR: 5× Platinum	Alt i sin tid
"Den eneste"	2011	—		Alt i sin tid
"Diva"	2011	20	IFPI NOR: 2× Platinum	Alt i sin tid
"Gatelys"	2012	—	IFPI NOR: Platinum	Vi er Cir.Cuz
"Øyeblikk" (featuring Elkjøp with IMA)	2012	—	IFPI NOR: Platinum	Non-album single
"Supernova" (featuring Julie Bergan)	2012	5	IFPI NOR: 14× Platinum	Vi er Cir.Cuz
"Tidløs"	2013	—	IFPI NOR: Gold	Vi er Cir.Cuz
"Vi er"	2013	—	IFPI NOR: Gold	Vi er Cir.Cuz
"Hele verden"	2014	—		Melodi Grand Prix 2014
"Før jeg dør" (featuring Medina)	2014	—	IFPI NOR: Gold	Hjertet mitt slår
"Original" (featuring Emila)	2015	28	IFPI NOR: Platinum	Hjertet mitt slår
"Lyset på"	2015	—		Non-album singles
"Casanova"	2016	—	IFPI NOR: Gold	Non-album singles
"Din idiot"	2017	—	IFPI NOR: Gold	Non-album singles
"Hjerteknuser" (featuring Susanne Louise)	2017	—	IFPI NOR: Gold	Non-album singles
"Snakk spansk til meg"	2018	—	IFPI NOR: Gold	Non-album singles
"Wellerman"	2021	—	IFPI NOR: Gold	Non-album singles
"Denne Sommer'n"	2022	—	IFPI NOR: Gold	Non-album singles
"Alt jeg har drømt om"	2023	38		Non-album singles
"—" denotes a single that did not chart or was not released.

==== As featured artists ====
Title	Year	Album
"Magaluf" (Trofast featuring Cir.Cuz)	2013	Non-album single

=== Other songs ===
Album featured covers

Title	Year	Album	Note
"Det va'kke min skyld"	2012	Cover Me	Cover of Ole I'Dole's single on TV 2's TV-show Cover Me
"Det vakreste som fins"	2016	En hyllest til Jahn; Teigen - Hele serien	Cover of Jahn Teigen's singles on TVNorge's TV-show En hyllest til Jahn Teigen
"Mil etter mil"	2016	En hyllest til Jahn; Teigen - Hele serien	Cover of Jahn Teigen's singles on TVNorge's TV-show En hyllest til Jahn Teigen

Non-single remix

Title	Original artist	Year
"Rush" (Cir.Cuz Remix)	Marit Børresen	2011
