= Lot to Learn =

Single by Luke Christopher

from the EP TMRW
- Released: September 11, 2015
- Recorded: 2014
- Length: 4:08
- Label: ByStorm; RCA
- Songwriter: Luke Hubbard

Luke Christopher singles chronology
"Plans" (2015)	"Lot to Learn" (2015)	"Changed Me" (2016)

Music video
- "Lot to Learn" on YouTube

"Lot to Learn" is a song from American singer Luke Christopher, serving as a single from his EP TMRW. The song was written by Luke Hubbard. It was made available for digital download on September 11, 2015, through ByStorm Entertainment and RCA Records.

== Track listing ==
Digital download – Garage Sessions
No.	Title	Length
1.	"Lot to Learn" (Garage Sessions)	2:46

Digital download – Tungevaag & Raaban Remix
No.	Title	Length
1.	"Lot to Learn" (Tungevaag & Raaban Remix)	3:03

== Charts ==
Chart performance for "Lot to Learn"
Chart (2016–2017)	Peak position
Australia (ARIA)	26
Austria (Ö3 Austria Top 40)	32
Belgium (Ultratip Bubbling Under Flanders)	4
Belgium Urban (Ultratop Flanders)	15
Belgium (Ultratip Bubbling Under Wallonia)	23
Czech Republic Singles Digital (ČNS IFPI)	36
Germany (GfK)	36
Italy (FIMI)	43
Netherlands (Single Top 100)	59
Norway (VG-lista)	24
Slovakia Singles Digital (ČNS IFPI)	57
Sweden (Sverigetopplistan)	27
Switzerland (Schweizer Hitparade)	89

== Certifications ==
Certifications for "Lot to Learn"
Region	Certification	Certified units/sales
Australia (ARIA)	Platinum	70,000^{‡}
Austria (IFPI Austria)	Gold	15,000^{‡}
Canada (Music Canada)	Gold	40,000^{‡}
Denmark (IFPI Danmark)	Gold	45,000^{‡}
Germany (BVMI)	Gold	200,000^{‡}
Italy (FIMI)	2× Platinum	100,000^{‡}
New Zealand (RMNZ)	Gold	15,000^{‡}
Sweden (GLF)	2× Platinum	80,000^{‡}
^{‡} Sales+streaming figures based on certification alone.
