= Sick Individuals =

Dutch musical duo

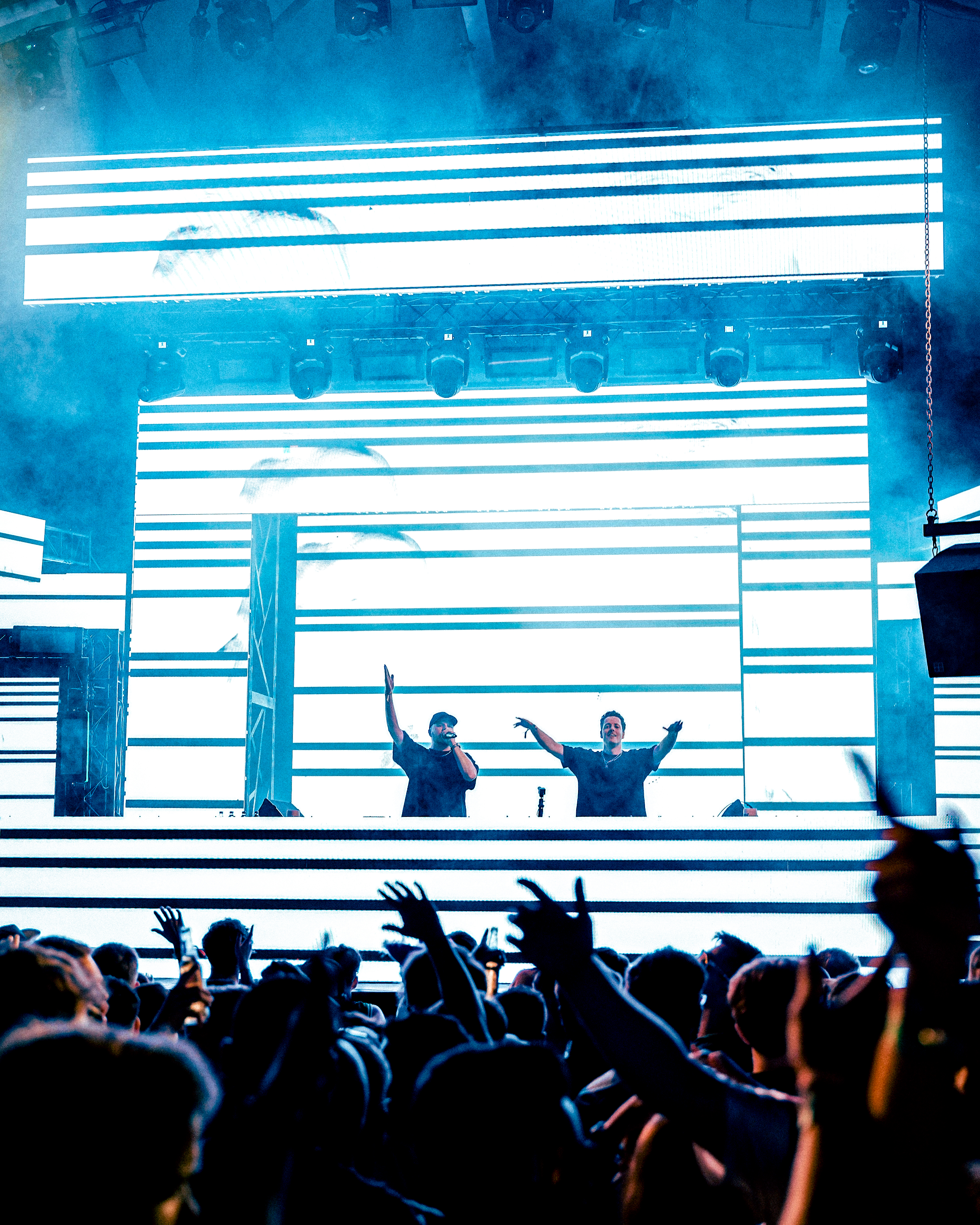
- Sick Individuals at NOA Beachclub in Croatia, 2024

Background information
- Also known as: Alderyn
- Origin: Hilversum, North Holland, Netherlands
- Genres: Tech house; electro house; progressive house; future house; trap; moombahton
- Occupations: Producers; DJs
- Instruments: Piano; guitar; midi; synthesizers; vocals
- Years active: 2010–present
- Labels: Axtone; Atlantic; Spinnin'; Armada; Size; Big Beat; Revealed; Ultra; Mainstage Music; Newmade Music
- Members: Joep "Jim" Smeele; Rinze "Ray" Hofstee
- Website: sickindividuals.com

Sick Individuals (stylized in all caps) are a Dutch DJ duo consisting of Rinze "Ray" Hofstee (Dutch pronunciation: [ˈrɪnzə ˈɦɔfsteː]; born 15 March 1988) and Joep "Jim" Smeele (Dutch pronunciation: [jup ˈsmeːlə]; born 3 November 1990). The two met in Hilversum (2008) while studying Music Composition. Jim and Ray had been composing for television commercials until their mutual fascination for both classical and modern music inspired their business partnership in 2010, when Sick Individuals was born.

Early in their careers, groups including Daft Punk, Bingo Players and the Swedish House Mafia influenced the duo. They have also produced with Axwell on the song "I Am", and with Dannic on "Blueprint" (both reached number one on Beatport) as well as remixing songs by Rihanna, Avicii, Icona Pop, Tiësto, Flo Rida and David Guetta. Their remix of Icona Pop's "I Love It" received a high level of support and recognition in the dance music industry.

== Discography ==
=== Extended plays ===
List of extended plays
Title	Details
BEATSBYSICK Vol. 01	Released: 31 January 2025; Label: Revealed Recordings; Format: Digital download

=== Singles ===
List of singles
Title	Year	Label	Album
"Over & Done"	2010	Cloud 9 Dance	Non-album single
"Strangers" (featuring Simoon)	2010	Cloud 9 Dance	Non-album single
"Future Love"	2010	Sneakerz MUZIK	Non-album single
"The Funky House Anthem"	2011	Sneakerz MUZIK	Non-album single
"Running Away"	2012	PinkStar Records	Non-album single
"Might Not Be" (featuring Bass Robbers)	2012	Big & Dirty	Non-album single
"Soldiers"	2012	Big & Dirty	Non-album single
"Free"	2013	Big & Dirty	Non-album single
"Pepper"	2013	OneLove	Non-album single
"Spear"	2013	Big & Dirty	Non-album single
"I AM" (with Axwell featuring Taylr Renee)	2013	Axtone	Non-album single
"Blueprint" (with Dannic)	2013	Revealed Recordings	Non-album single
"Lights of Neon	2013	OneLove	Non-album single
"Drum Machine	2013	SIZE Records	Non-album single
"Chase	2013	SIZE Records	Non-album single
"Shock"	2014	OneLove	Non-album single
"Rock & Rave"	2014	Ultra Music	Non-album single
"Wasting Moonlight"	2014	Armada Music	Non-album single
"Lost & Found"	2014	Revealed Recordings	Non-album single
"Made For This"	2014	Revealed Recordings	Non-album single
"Olympia" (with Ariyan)	2014	Doorn (Spinnin' Records)	Non-album single
"Skyline"	2015	Mainstage Music	Non-album single
"Prime"	2015	Doorn (Spinnin' Records)	Non-album single
"Never Fade" (featuring [Kaelyn Behr])	2015	Armada Music	Non-album single
"Waiting For You" (with DBSTF)	2015	Mainstage Music	Non-album single
"Feel Your Love" (with Dannic)	2015	Revealed Recordings	Non-album single
"Drive"	2015	Revealed Recordings	Non-album single
"Unstoppable (We Are) (Race Car Soundtrack)"	2016	TurnItUp Muzik	Non-album single
"Into The Light" (with DBSTF)	2016	Revealed Recordings	Non-album single
"Take It On" (with jACQ)	2016	Armada Music	Non-album single
"Mrs." (featuring Stevie Appleton)	2016	Armada Music	Non-album single
"Against All Odds"	2016	Armada Music	Non-album single
"HELIX" (with Holl & Rush)	2016	Mainstage Music	Non-album single
"People I Love" (featuring Stevie Appleton)	2016	Thrive Music	Non-album single
"Alive"	2016	Revealed Recordings	Non-album single
"Focus"	2017	Revealed Recordings	Non-album single
"Never Say Never"	2017	Revealed Recordings	Non-album single
"Everything"	2017	Moon Records	Non-album single
"Walk Away" (featuring Greyson Chance)	2017	Revealed Recordings	Non-album single
"Turn Up" (featuring Yamato)	2017	Rhythm Zone	Non-album single
"Flow" (with Mightyfools)	2017	Armada Music	Non-album single
"Get Low" (with Hardwell)	2017	Revealed Recordings	Non-album single
"KODI"	2018	Revealed Recordings	Non-album single
"The Key"	2018	Maxximize Records	Non-album single
"Writing On The Wall" (featuring Jason Walker)	2018	Proximity	Non-album single
"Reaction" (with Jewelz & Sparks)	2018	Revealed Recordings	Non-album single
"Beautiful Place"	2018	One Seven Music	Non-album single
"Easy" (featuring Mph)	2018	One Seven Music	Non-album single
"Symphony" (featuring Nevve)	2018	Revealed Recordings	Non-album single
"Luna"	2019	Revealed Recordings	Non-album single
"We Got It All" (featuring Mph)	2019	One Seven Music	Non-album single
"Humans (Let Me Love You)" (featuring April Bender)	2019	Revealed Recordings	Non-album single
"Wait for You" (featuring Matluck)	2019	One Seven Music	Non-album single
"Not Alone" (with Justin Prime featuring Bymia)	2019	Revealed Recordings	Non-album single
"Right Next to You" (featuring Kepler)	2019	One Seven Music	Non-album single
"I'll Be Here For You"	2019	Revealed Recordings	Non-album single
"Fallin'"	2019	NEWMADE Music	Non-album single
"Guilty" (with Justin Prime featuring Nevve)	2019	Revealed Recordings	Non-album single
"I Could Use A Friend" (featuring Tim Schou)	2020	NEWMADE Music	Non-album single
"Come Alive" (featuring Robbie Rosen)	2020	Revealed Recordings	Non-album single
"Never Fade" (featuring Kaelyn Behr)	2020	Revealed Recordings	Non-album single
"Tonight" (with Jewelz & Sparks)	2020	Revealed Recordings	Non-album single
"Higher" (featuring TRØVE)	2020	NEWMADE Music	Non-album single
"People I Love" (featuring Stevie Appleton)	2020	NEWMADE Music	Non-album single
"RUBY"	2020	Revealed Recordings	Non-album single
"Dance With Me"	2020	NEWMADE Music	Non-album single
"Dear Love" (featuring Matluck)	2020	NEWMADE Music	Non-album single
"Ocean" (with Justin Prime and Lasada)	2020	Revealed Recordings	Non-album single
"Only For You" (with Nicky Romero featuring XIRA)	2020	Protocol Recordings	Non-album single
"Runaway" (with Vigel and Nazzereene)	2020	Revealed Recordings	Non-album single
"Miss You" (with Tungevaag and MARF)	2020	Spinnin' Records	Non-album single
"All Of My Heart"	2021	Spinnin' Records	Non-album single
"Flame" (featuring Ekko)	2021	Revealed Recordings	Non-album single
"Gotta Get To You" (featuring Kheela)	2021	NEWMADE Music	Non-album single
"I Want You"	2021	Revealed Recordings	Non-album single
"When I'm Right" (with Morgan Page featuring Asia Whiteacre)	2021	Armada Music	Non-album single
"Heavy Heart" (featuring Samuel Gajicki)	2021	NEWMADE Music	Non-album single
"Bring It Home"	2021	Revealed Recordings	Non-album single
"All These Things" (featuring Jason Walker)	2021	NEWMADE Music	Non-album single
"More Than I Want To"	2022	One Seven Music	Non-album single
"MAKI"	2022	Revealed Recordings	Non-album single
"Tu Es Partout" (with Alderyn featuring ØSCR)	2022	NEWMADE Music	Non-album single
"With My Friends" (with Tungevaag and Philip Strand)	2022	Spinnin' Records	Non-album single
"Pull Me Trough"	2022	Revealed Recordings	Non-album single
"I'll Be There" (with Dastic)	2022	Revealed Recordings	Non-album single
"Closer Together" (featuring Jason Walker)	2022	NEWMADE Music	Non-album single
"Fireflies" (featuring Nazzereene)	2022	NEWMADE Music	Non-album single
"We Go Out" (with Alesso)	2022	10:22PM	Non-album single
"Better With You"	2022	Spinnin' Records	Non-album single
"My Life" (with Alle Farben featuring The Runway Club)	2023	Spinnin' Records	Non-album single
"YOU" (featuring Dotter)	2023	Spinnin' Records	Non-album single
"Heart On Fire"	2023	NEWMADE Music	Non-album single
"MAIA"	2023	Spinnin' Records	Non-album single
"Never Have I Ever" (with Alderyn featuring Tessa Odden)	2023	NEWMADE Music	Non-album single
"ROOTS"	2023	Revealed Recordings	Non-album single
"Lose Control" (with Tujamo)	2023	Spinnin' Records	Non-album single
"The Playground"	2023	NEWMADE Music	Non-album single
"Good Times"	2023	NEWMADE Music	Non-album single
"Waste My Time" (with Madism)	2023	Spinnin' Records	Non-album single
"The Darkness" (with Madism)	2023	Revealed Recordings	Non-album single
"Dizzy" (featuring Loui lane)	2024	Maison Riche Entertainment	Non-album single
"Love Like That"	2024	NEWMADE Music	Non-album single
"Atmosphere"	2024	Revealed Recordings	Non-album single
"Serenity"	2024	Revealed Recordings	Non-album single
"In My Head" (with Nicky Romero)	2024	Protocol Recordings	Non-album single
"No Drama"	2024	NEWMADE Music	Non-album single
"Who Do You Love" (featuring Jaimes)	2024	Maison Riche Entertainment	Non-album single
"I Am Not Alone"	2024	Revealed Recordings	Non-album single
"Dreamer (Just Like You)" (featuring Martin Jasper)	2024	Revealed Recordings	Non-album single
"How It Goes"	2024	Soave Records	Non-album single
"Ricochet" (with Alderyn featuring Anna Graceman)	2024	Signatune	Non-album single
"Lifted"	2024	Maison Riche Entertainment	Non-album single
"Goosebumps"	2024	NEWMADE Music	Non-album single
"How We Feelin"	2025	Revealed Recordings	BEATSBYSICK Vol. 01
"Move It Down"	2025	Revealed Recordings	BEATSBYSICK Vol. 01
"Thinkin' Bout You Now" (with Morgan Page featuring Emery Taylor)	2025	NEWMADE Music	Non-album single
"Hole in the Head" (with Vikkstar)	2025	Heartfeldt Records	Non-album single

=== Remixes ===
- The Chainsmokers - Kills You Slowly
- Beverly - I Need Your Love
- Rita Ora - Your Song
- Kev - Moments
- Moby - Porcelain
- Dazepark - Rift
- Madonna - Bitch I'm Madonna
- Avicii – Addicted To You
- Flo Rida – How I Feel
- Jerome Isma-Ae – Hold That Sucker Down
- Timeflies – I Choose U
- Rihanna and David Guetta – Right Now
- Savoy – We Are The Sun
- Roberto Da Costa featuring Daphne Koo – Excited
- Dave Aude featuring Irina – One Last Kiss
- Hook N Sling and Nervo – Reason
- Someday – You're in my Head
- Icona Pop – I Love It
- Qulinez – Troll
- Korr A – Firecracka
- Lost Witness – Our Suns Rising
- Nelly Furtado – Spirit Indestructible
- Kevin Scott – Jump All Night
- Marco V – GOHF
- Nelly Furtado – Big Hoops
- Nire Alldai – Hella Bad
- Conor Mayard – Vegas Girl
- Jenny Andrews – Unhappy Ending
- DJ Pauly D – Night of My Life
- Alex Sayz and Nadia Ali – Free To Go
- Justin Bieber featuring Far East Movement – Live My Life
- Victoria Aitken – Weekend Lover
- DJ Jean – Every Single Day
- Tiesto – Bleckentrommel
- Hoxton Whores, MelleeFresh – Let's Get Dirty
- Nu Soul Family – This Is for My People
- Go Back to the Zoo – Hey DJ
- Kato – Celebrate Life
- Laurent Simeca – On Fire
- Freestylers – Cracks
- Steve Edwards, Louis Botella and Joe Smooth – Promised Land
- Flo Rida – Good Feeling
- Natalia Kills featuring Will.I.am – Free
- Josh The Funky 1 – Love The World
- Tuccillo and Patty Pravo – La Bambola
- Irad Brant – We Must Go On
- Housequake – Give A Little Love
- Dark Matters featuring Jessie Morgan – Miracles
- Franky Rizardo – Flute Test
- Carlos Silva featuring Nelson Freitas and Eddy Parker – Mystery
- DJ Raymundo – Come On
- Melvin Reese – All Day All Night
- Graffiti6 – Stare in to The Sun
- Nicky Romero – Growl
- Soltrenz Soundstage, Kelvin Scott – Jump All Night
- NSF – It's Whatever You Want
- Melleefresh vs. Deadmau5 – BRH
- Melvin Reese featuring Sunnery James and Ryan Marciano – Lift U Up
- Mayra Veronica – Mama Mia
- Irina – One Last Kiss
- Leah Labelle – Lolita
- Vox Halo featuring LaDolla – Criminal
- Asher Monroe – Here With You
- Danny Avila – Breaking Your Fall
- Dimitri Vangelis and Wyman featuring Jonny Rose – Pieces of Light
- Christian Paul – Strong
- Hardwell – Apollo
- Sam Feldt and Rita Ora – Follow Me
- Mae Stephens – If We Ever Broke Up

== Websites ==
- Official website
