= Laser Inc =

Swedish Eurodance duo

- Origin: Sweden
- Genres: Eurodance
- Years active: 2007–2009, 2023–present
- Labels: Warner Music Sweden
- Members: Jonas Törn (singer); Robbin, (DJ and producer)
- Past members: Izko (Chainkickerz)
- Website: www.myspace.com/laserinc

Laser Inc was a two-person Swedish Eurodance band. The band's single "Det var en gång en fågel" became a hit in Sweden and Finland in the summer of 2007, reaching a peak of number six on the Swedish charts during a 15-week run, and 11 in two weeks on the Finnish charts. The duet's members were Jonas, the singer and songwriter, and Robin (or Raaban, full name Robbin Söderlund), who was the music producer.

The band also included Izko (Chainkickerz), who performed a Russian dance, and he was also helping to produce the music, but left prior to the band's break-up. The band was signed to Warner Music Sweden. Although the band are all still friends, they split up to assume solo careers.

Raaban (Robbin) has established a career as a house producer under the pseudonym "Brilliant". He was also a part of the production duo Tungevaag & Raaban.

== Discography ==
=== Singles ===
(Selective)

Year	Single	Peak positions		Album
Year	Single	SWE	FIN	Album
2007	"Det var en gång en fågel"	6	11	Roger That!

Others

- Dansa tills ni svimmar
- Fiske Eliten
- Sola och bada
- Festen är Igång
- Abraham
- Utgång ikväll
- När man var liten
- Vill ha dej (Freestyle cover)

=== Albums ===
==== Roger That! ====
Roger That! is the first studio album by Swedish Eurodance band Laser Inc. It was released on May 4, 2009, under the Warner Music Sweden Label. The 12 track album includes their hit single "Det var en gång en fågel". The lyrics are primarily in Swedish with a few English phrases included in the album.

==== Track listing ====
No.	Title	Length
1.	"Dansa tills ni svimmar"	3:31
2.	"Det var en gång en fågel"	3:35
3.	"Vem är du"	3:55
4.	"Vill ha dig"	4:28
5.	"Lin"	3:32
6.	"När man var liten (Radio Edit)"	3:30
7.	"Abraham (Radio Edit)"	3:23
8.	"Fiskeeliten"	3:34
9.	"Festen är igång"	3:40
10.	"Utgång i kväll"	3:11
11.	"Abraham (Neonberger Club Edit)"	2:26
12.	"Det var en gång en fågel [Original Internet Version]"	3:40
Total length:		42:30
