= Tungevaag & Raaban =

Dance music producer duo

- Origin: Stadlandet, Norway; Borås, Sweden
- Genres: Melbourne bounce, Dubstep, Electro house, Progressive house, Moombahton
- Years active: 2015–2019
- Labels: Sony Music
- Members: Martin Tungevaag; Robbin Söderlund

Tungevaag & Raaban was a dance music producer duo consisting of the Norwegian Martin Tungevaag from Stadlandet in Norway, and the Swedish Robbin Söderlund (better known by his artistic name Raaban) from Borås in Sweden. Sharing a common interest for the EDM genre, they have both collaborated and separately produced music within the genre for many years. On December 9, 2019, the duo announced on Instagram that "creatively we will pursue different goals and paths".

== Discography ==
=== Singles ===
Year	Single	Peak positions						Certifications
Year	Single	NOR	SWE	AUT	DEN	FIN	GER	Certifications
2015	"Samsara" (featuring Emila)	2	4	7	8	1	60	IFPI NOR: 4× Platinum; GLF: 3× Platinum; IFPI AUT: Platinum; IFPI DEN: Platinum
2015	"Parade 2015"	—	—	—	—	—	—	IFPI NOR: Gold; GLF: Gold
2015	"Russian Roulette" (with Charlie Who?)	9	10	—	—	1	—	IFPI NOR: 2× Platinum; GLF: 4× Platinum
2016	"Wolf"	10	86	—	—	2	13	IFPI NOR: 2× Platinum
2016	"Magical"	39	—	—	—	12	—	IFPI NOR: Platinum
2016	"Stay Awake" (featuring VENIOR)	—	—	—	—	—	—	
2016	"Beast" (featuring Isac Elliot)	7	31	—	—	3	—	IFPI NOR: 2× Platinum; GLF: Platinum
2017	"Wake Up Alone" (featuring Clara Mae)	29	—	—	—	—	—	IFPI NOR: Platinum
2017	"Cold Blood" (featuring Jeffrey James)	—	—	—	—	—	—	IFPI NOR: Gold
2017	"Coming Up" (featuring Victor Crone)	—	— (Note: "Coming Up" did not enter the Sverigetopplistan singles chart, but peaked at number two on the Sverigetopplistan Heatseekers chart.)	—	—	—	—	IFPI NOR: Gold; GLF: Gold
2018	"All for Love"	9	10	—	—	5	—	IFPI NOR: 3× Platinum; GLF: 4× Platinum
2018	"Bad Boy" (featuring Luana Kiara)	—	40	—	—	—	—	IFPI NOR: Gold
2018	"Hey Baby"	—	62	—	—	—	—	IFPI NOR: Gold
2019	"Million Lights"	26	— (Note: "Million Lights" did not enter the Swedish Singellista Chart, but peaked at number 13 on the Swedish Heatseeker Chart.)	—	—	17	—	IFPI NOR: Platinum
2019	"Try Again" (featuring A7S)	—	— (Note: "Try Again" did not enter the Swedish Singellista Chart, but peaked at number one on the Swedish Heatseeker Chart.)	—	—	—	—	
2019	"Take Me Away" (with Victor Crone)	—	— (Note: "Take Me Away" did not enter the Swedish Singellista Chart, but peaked at number three on the Swedish Heatseeker Chart.)	—	—	—	—	

=== Remixes ===
Title	Original artist	Year
"Faded" (Tungevaag & Raaban Remix)	Alan Walker	2016
"It's Gotta Be You" (Tungevaag & Raaban Remix)	Isaiah	2017
"Lot to Learn" (Tungevaag & Raaban Remix)	Luke Christopher	2017
"Take Me Home" (Tungevaag & Raaban Remix)	BUNT. featuring Alexander Tidebrink	2017

== Awards and nominations ==
Year	Organization	Award	Work	Result	Ref.
2018	MTV Europe Music Awards	Best Norwegian Act	Tungevaag & Raaban	Nominated	
