= Miss You (Martin Tungevaag, Sick Individuals and Marf song) =

2020 single by Martin Tungevaag, Sick Individuals and Marf

Single by Martin Tungevaag, Sick Individuals and Marf
- Released: 13 November 2020
- Genre: Dance-pop; EDM; progressive house
- Length: 2:40
- Label: Spinnin'
- Songwriters: E. Van Tijn; F.F. Viguurs; J. Fluitsma; J. SmeeleM.; Tungevaag; M.G.A. Adema; R. Hofstee; R.F. de Wilde
- Producers: MARF; Sick Individuals; Tungevaag

Martin Tungevaag singles chronology
"Afterparty" (2020)	"Miss You" (2020)	"Kingdoms" (2020)

Sick Individuals singles chronology
"Runaway" (2020)	"Miss You" (2020)	"All of My Heart" (2021)

Music video
- "Miss You" on YouTube

"Miss You" is a song by Norwegian DJ and producer Martin Tungevaag, Dutch DJ duo Sick Individuals and producer Marf. It was released on 13 November 2020 via Spinnin' Records.

== Background and content ==
Dance music artist Marf accepted an interview with EDM Unplugged and explained the inspiration behind the song:

We wrote the track before the pandemic. However, I believe that missing people can be a sad thing, but also a great thing of value! It gives us a more important and different look at people whom we miss, and even more on ourselves! That’s why the first sentence says: "Thought that I would find myself but discovered someone else".

Natalie Wicks wrote in the article that "Miss You" is "a sun-kissed, upbeat release that is perfect for the changing of the seasons, with an enrapturing melody and a catchy hook" and that it was "embraced by the world." The song is written in the key of A major, with a tempo of 125 beats per minute.

== Credits and personnel ==
Credits adapted from AllMusic.

- Marcus Adema – composer
- Jochen Fluitsma – composer
- Rinze Hofstee – composer
- Marf – primary artist, producer, programmer
- Sick Individuals – primary artist, producer, programmer
- Jim Smeele – composer
- Martin Tungevaag – composer, primary artist, producer, programmer
- Eric VanTijn – composer
- Flemming Viguurs – composer

== Charts ==
=== Weekly charts ===
Weekly chart performance for "Miss You"
Chart (2020–2021)	Peak position
Belgium (Ultratip Bubbling Under Flanders)	5
Netherlands (Dutch Top 40)	19
Netherlands (Single Top 100)	71

=== Year-end charts ===
Year-end chart performance for "Miss You"
Chart (2021)	Position
Netherlands (Dutch Top 40)	87
