= Original (Cir.Cuz song) =

Single by Cir.Cuz featuring Emila
- Released: 8 December 2014
- Recorded: 2014
- Genre: Pop-rap
- Length: 3:27
- Label: Cosmos Music Group

Cir.Cuz singles chronology
"Tidløs" (2013)	"Original" (2014)

Music video
- "Original" on YouTube

"Original" is a song performed by Norwegian pop duo Cir.Cuz featuring vocals from Emila. It was released on 8 December 2014 as a digital download in Norway. The song peaked at number 28 on the Norwegian Singles Chart.

== Track listing ==
Digital download
No.	Title	Length
1.	"Original" (feat. Emila)	3:42

== Chart performance ==
=== Weekly charts ===
Chart (2015)	Peak position
Norway (VG-lista)	28

== Certifications ==
Certifications for "Original"
Region	Certification	Certified units/sales
Norway (IFPI Norway)	Platinum	10,000^{‡}
^{‡} Sales+streaming figures based on certification alone.

== Release history ==
Region	Date	Format	Label
Norway	8 December 2014	Digital download	Cosmos Music Group
