= Wicked Wonderland (song) =

Single by Martin Tungevaag
- Released: 30 June 2014
- Genre: EDM
- Length: 3:37
- Label: Kontor Records
- Songwriter(s): Martin Tungevaag; Henning Olerud; Caroline Hartung
- Producer(s): Martin Tungevaag

Martin Tungevaag singles chronology
| "Wicked Wonderland" (2014) | "Vidorra" (2014) |

Music video
- "Wicked Wonderland" on YouTube

"Wicked Wonderland" is a 2014 single by Norwegian DJ and record producer Martin Tungevaag and his first major hit. It was co-produced in collaboration with Norwegian DJ and producer Olly Hence. The track was produced at Starlab Studios in Oslo, Norway.

The single charted in Norway, Germany, Switzerland and topped the Austrian Singles Chart.

== Music video ==
The official music video is a mix of an ordinary video and a "lyrics video". The scenes display two young women flirting on a seaside or in a pool in a touristic resort or hitting the road together in a scenic panorama. The shots are interspersed with a musician performing on the saxophone.

== Track list ==
1. "Wicked Wonderland" (3:37)
2. "Wicked Wonderland" (extended mix) (5:09)
3. "Wicked Wonderland" (Olly Hence radio edit) (3:37)
4. "Wicked Wonderland" (Olly Hence remix) (5:30)
5. "Wicked Wonderland" (instrumental) (3:37)
6. "Wicked Wonderland" (instrumental extended mix) (5:09)

== Charts ==
=== Weekly charts ===
| Chart (2014–15) | Peak position |
|---|---|
| Austria (Ö3 Austria Top 40) | 1 |
| Belgium (Ultratip Bubbling Under Flanders) | 28 |
| Belgium (Ultratop 50 Wallonia) | 43 |
| Finland (Suomen virallinen lista) | 5 |
| France (SNEP) | 9 |
| Germany (GfK) | 6 |
| Italy (FIMI) | 78 |
| Norway (VG-lista) | 4 |
| Poland (Dance Top 50) | 27 |
| Poland (Video Chart) | 5 |
| Slovenia (SloTop50) | 32 |
| Spain (PROMUSICAE) | 93 |
| Sweden (Sverigetopplistan) | 2 |
| Switzerland (Schweizer Hitparade) | 21 |

=== Year-end charts ===
| Chart (2014) | Position |
|---|---|
| Austria (Ö3 Austria Top 40) | 20 |
| France (SNEP) | 99 |
| Germany (Official German Charts) | 38 |
| Sweden (Sverigetopplistan) | 45 |
| Switzerland (Schweizer Hitparade) | 69 |

| Chart (2015) | Position |
|---|---|
| France (SNEP) | 158 |

== Certifications ==
| Region | Certification | Certified units/sales |
|---|---|---|
| Germany (BVMI) | Platinum | 400,000^{‡} |
| Norway (IFPI Norway) | 3× Platinum | 180,000^{‡} |
^{‡} Sales+streaming figures based on certification alone.
