= Kerry Turner =

American composer and horn player (born 1960)

Kerry Turner (born October 16, 1960) is an American composer and horn player. Turner is a recognized name in the horn and brass industry. Turner's major ensembles with whom he performs include the American Horn Quartet, the Virtuoso Horn Duo, and the Luxembourg Philharmonic Orchestra. Turner has performed internationally as a soloist and clinician. Turner also sings tenor in a semi-professional octet.

== Life ==
At age 11, Kerry Turner won the San Antonio Music Society Composition Competition. At 17, he was awarded a scholarship to attend Baylor University after winning the Baylor composition contest. Turner transferred to the Manhattan School of Music and received a Fulbright scholarship to study with Hermann Baumann at the Stuttgart College of Music and Performing Arts upon graduation. He placed fifth at the Geneva International Horn Competition and won the bronze medal at the 39th Prague Spring International Music Competition. In 1983, Turner assumed the position of principal horn of the Gürzenich Orchester, Cologne. In 1985, Turner joined the Radio-Tele-Luxembourg Symphony Orchestra and the American Horn Quartet.

Turner's compositions have been commissioned by many organizations, including the United States Air Force Heritage of America Band, the Luxembourg Philharmonic, the Japanese Horn Ensemble, and the Richmond, Virginia Chamber Music Society. His works have been awarded top prizes at the International Horn Society Composition Contest and the IBLA Foundation. Turner received the Meir Rimon Commissioning Assistance Fund from the International Horn Society in 1993 to compose Six Lives of Jack McBride for horn, violin, tenor voice, and piano and again in 2004 to compose Scorpion in the Sand for horn, cello, and piano.

Turner's Quartet Nr. 1 won first prize in the International Horn Society's composition contest. Quartet Nr. 3 was awarded a prize in the International Horn Society composition contest in 1996. The Freden International Music Festival in Germany commissioned Turner to compose a brass quintet titled Ricochet, which become one of Turner's most successful works.

Several notable commissions include the U.S. Air Force "Heritage of America" band (Postcards from Lucca), the Alexander Horn Ensemble Japan (Ghosts of Dublin), the Brass Ensemble of the Symphony Orchestra of Lyon (The Heros), the Luxembourg Chamber Orchestra (The Celestials of Sago Lane), Palisades Virtuosi (Vathek), the Detroit Symphony Orchestra (Concerto for Horn and Orchestra "The Gothic"), and the horn sections of the Houston and Dallas symphonies (The Bronze Triptych). Turner's music, which contains elements of folk music from the British Isles, a Mexican influence combined with his own western American style, and the sounds of North Africa and the Arab world, has been performed and recorded by chamber ensembles from the New York Philharmonic, The Berlin Philharmonic, the Vienna Philharmonic, and the Chicago Symphony, among others.

Turner has been a guest lecturer in composition at several institutions of music, including the Royal Academy of Oslo, the Academy of Fine Arts in Hong Kong, the Nero House of Music in Osaka, Japan, West Virginia University and the Winterthur Hochschule für Musik in Switzerland.

== Works ==
=== Large ensembles ===
- Karankawa - Symphony orchestra
- Concerto for Low Horn & Chamber Orchestra - Horn, chamber orchestra
- Les Heroes - Large brass ensemble, percussion
- Concerto for Bass Trombone (or Tuba) & Orchestra - Bass trombone (or tuba), orchestra
- The Labyrinth - Brass ensemble, percussion
- Postcards from Lucca - Wind ensemble
- Sonata for Horn & Strings - Horn, string quartet or string orchestra
- Symphony Nr. 1 - Symphony orchestra with chorus
- Symphony Nr. 2 - Chamber orchestra
- Celestials of Sago Lane - Chamber orchestra, 2 percussion soloists
- Karankawa - Symphony orchestra, or symphonic band, or wind ensemble
- Concerto for Brass Trombone - Brass trombone or bass tuba, orchestra
- Introduction & Main Event - Horn quartet, symphony orchestra, wind ensemble
- ’Twas a Dark and Stormy Night - Version for 2 horns, string orchestra

=== Chamber works ===
- Ricochet - Brass quintet
- Quartet Nr. 3 for Horns - Horn quartet
- Casbah of Tetouan - Brass quintet
- Fiesta Fanfare - 4 trumpets or 4 horns
- Sonata for Horn & Piano - Horn, piano
- ’Twas a Dark and Stormy Night - Horn, organ (piano)
- Quartet Nr. 2 for Horns - Horn quartet
- Bandera - Trumpet, horn, trombone, piano
- Variations on a Luxembourgish Folk Song - Horn quartet
- Fanfare for Barcs - Horn quartet
- Quartet Nr. 1 for Horns - Horn quartet
- The Black Knight - Brass quintet, organ
- Soundings on the Erie Canal - Brass quintet
- Sonatina for Tuba & Piano - Tuba, piano
- Casbah of Tetouan - 5 horns
- Six Lives of Jack McBride - Tenor voice, horn, violin, piano
- Unlikely Fusion: Prologue & Epilogue for Four Horns, Tuba, Harpsichord, & Fiddle - 4 horns, tuba, harpsichord, fiddle
- Ghost Riders - 2 trumpets, 2 horns, 2 trombones, bass trombone, tuba, (optional tenor voice)
- The Pocono Menagerie - trumpet, horn, tuba/euphonium, piano
- Chaconne for Three Horns - 3 horns
- Song of Mary for Eight Voices - 8 voices (SSAATTBB)
- Quarter-After-Four - Horn, violin, piano
- The Seduction - String quartet
- Vathek - Flute, clarinet, piano
- The Ballad to Annabel Lee - Trumpet, piano
- Wedding Music - 4 horns, narrator
- Fandango - 4 horns
- Quartet Nr. 4 for Horns - 4 horns
- Improvisation - Brass quintet
- Sonatina for Violoncello or tuba, piano - Violoncello (or tuba), piano
- Suite for Solo Tuba & Horn Quartet - 4 horns, tuba
- Barbara Allen - 4 horns or 8 horns
- The Ghosts of Dublin - 8 horns
- Rhapsody - Woodwind quintet, violin, viola, violoncello, double bass
- The New-Found Journal - 4 tubas or woodwind quartet (flute, clarinet, horn, bassoon)
- Four Duets - 2 horns or 2 tubas
- Rule Britannia! - 4 horns
- Take 9 Fanfare - 9 horns
- Three Movements for Hour Horns - 4 horns
- Symphony for Carols - 8 horns, including 2 alphorns (optional)
- Farewell to Red Castle - String orchestra (later reworked for horn octet)
- The New-Found Journal - Flute, clarinet, horn, bassoon
- ’Twas a Dark and Stromy Night - Version for 2 horns, organ or piano
- Cortejo - Brass quintet
- Kaitsenko - Brass quintet
- The Scorpion in the Sand - Violoncello, horn, piano
- Bronze Triptych - 12 horns, timpani, percussion
- Scorpion in the Sand - Violoncello, horn, piano
- Berceuse for the Mary Rose - Woodwind Quintet (flute, oboe, clarinet, horn, bassoon)
- Navajo Mandala - Combined woodwind, brass quintet with percussion
- La Diosa del Lago (Teo Michi Cihualli), Opus 96, for clarinet, horn and violoncello, and various percussion instruments

=== Solo works ===
- Three Portraits - Solo horn
- Characters - Solo horn
- Come Thou Font of Every Blessing - Solo piano
- The Testament of Saladin - Solo horn
- Echoes of Glastonbury - Solo horn
- La Entrada de los Caballeros - Solo horn
- La Viuda de Salamanca - Solo horn
- Phantom Shanties - Solo horn
- Nine Pieces for Solo Horn - Solo horn
- Caprice - Solo horn
- The Twelve-Tone Waltz - Solo horn
- Crossing Union Square - Solo horn
- The Hunt of the Cheetah - Solo horn
