= Joëlle Mogensen =

French singer (1953–1982)

Joëlle Choupay-Mogensen (February 3, 1953 – May 15, 1982) was a singer of French songs. Between 1972 and 1979, she was the lead vocals of Il était une fois releasing 8 albums.

== Beginning career ==
Born in Long Island, New York, Joëlle was the daughter of a French/Vietnamese/American mother and a Danish father who was serving with UNICEF at the United Nations in New York City. The family eventually returned to Copenhagen in the early part of the 1960s where she attended a private religious school. She spoke six languages and was a member of the volleyball team. She began singing at a young age and as a fan of Bob Dylan, developed a folk song repertoire, appearing on American and Danish television variety shows, playing a guitar and singing.

In 1969 she went to live in Southern France with her mother and sisters where she met guitarist Serge Koolenn. Mogensen studied music at a school in Marseille and began her career singing folk music in cafés and small clubs. By 1971, she and Koolenn had begun a relationship and together recorded a 45 rpm.

== In Il était une fois ==
After meeting Richard Dewitte, they soon organized a musical ensemble of five males with Joëlle as lead singer. Naming the group "Il était une fois" (literally meaning "Once upon a time" in English). The band continued between 1972 and 1979 produced eight albums.

The band was very popular and appeared frequently on French television variety shows with other performers of the time such as Johnny Hallyday and fellow American-born French singer, Joe Dassin. The albums released were the self-titled Il était une fois in 1972, Ils vécurent heureux in 1974, Tourne la page in 1977 and Pomme in 1978. The single "J'ai encore rêvé d'elle" released in 1975 remains their most successful hit.

In 1978 the group broke up after she separated from Serge Koolenn.

== Solo career ==
After the break-up of Il était une fois, Joëlle signed with Barclay Records. An admirer of the French singer Jean Sablon, she sang with him and dedicated her 1979 "Numéro un" to him. As a solo artist, she released her only album, Joëlle tout court, in 1980. This provided the song Homme impossible that became a best-selling single on the European music charts in 1981.

Joëlle Mogensen was also a member of L'équipe à Jojo with Joe Dassin, Carlos, Dave and Jeane Manson.

== Death ==
On May 14, 1982 Joëlle visited her sisters in Neuilly-sur-Seine, Île-de-France, France, then had dinner with friends with whom she spent the night. In the morning, the 29-year-old singer was found dead. An autopsy determined that the cause of death was a pulmonary edema.

Joëlle Mogensen was interred in the Cimetière du Montparnasse in Paris. Her "Aime-moi" was released three days after her death.

== See also ==
- Official website
- Il était une fois : un conte de fée moderne
