= Il était une fois l'indépendance =

- Directed by: Daouda Coulibaly
- Screenplay by: Daouda Coulibaly
- Produced by: Trace Visuelle Productions
- Starring: Yaya Coulibaly Oumou Doumbia Fatoumata Sankaré
- Cinematography: Nicolas Frébault
- Edited by: Daouda Coulibaly
- Release date: 2009
- Running time: 21 minutes
- Countries: France; Mali

Il était une fois l'indépendance is a 2009 Malian film.

== Synopsis ==
Nama and Siré marry in the early sixties. Nama is a very pious marabout who decides to pull away from the world with his wife to dedicate himself fully to God and live as a hermit. To reward him, God sends him an angel. Nama must make three wishes.

This film is based on a traditional Malian tale.

== Awards ==
- Festival Internacional de Cine de Ouidah (Benín) 2009
- Festival de cortos francófonos de Vaulx-en-Velin (Francia) 2010
