= Il était une fois (band) =

French musical group

- Origin: France
- Genres: Pop
- Years active: 1972–1979
- Label: Pathé Marconi
- Members: Joëlle Mogensen; Serge Koolenn; Richard Dewitte; Lionel Gaillardin; Jean-Louis Dronne
- Past members: Bruno Walker; Christian Burguière; Daniel Schnitzer

Il était une fois was a popular French musical group fronted by Joëlle Mogensen as lead vocals. Formed in Paris in 1972, it included besides Mogensen, Serge Koolenn, Richard Dewitte, Lionel Gaillardin, Bruno Walker and Christian Burguière. Walker and Burguière were later replaced by Jean-Louis Dronne and Daniel Schnitzer. The band was signed to the Pathé Marconi label.

The very popular band broke up in 1979 when Joëlle Mogensen left, just three years before her sudden death in 1982 at the age of 29.

The band released four studio albums and a great number of singles, including "J'ai encore rêvé d'elle", which sold more than a million copies. A number of compilation albums were released later.

== Discography ==
=== Albums ===
- 1972: Il était une fois
- 1975: Ils vécurent heureux
- 1977: Tourne la page
- 1978: Pomme

Compilation albums

- 1992: Il était une fois – Les plus belles fois
- 1994: Il était une fois – Leurs plus belles chansons
- 1996: Le meilleur de
- 1998: 20 chansons d'or
- 2000: Anthologie
- 2002: Essentials
- 2007: Platinum Collection
- 2007: Best of – La légende
- 2012: Best of 2012

=== Singles ===
- 1972: "Rien qu'un ciel"
- 1972: "Les filles du mercredi"
- 1973: "Que fais-tu ce soir après dîner?"
- 1973: "C'était l'année dernière"
- 1973: "Quand tu partiras"
- 1974: "Compte sur tes doigts"
- 1975: "J'ai encore rêvé d'elle"
- 1975: "Viens faire un tour sous la pluie"
- 1976: "Toi et la musique"
- 1976: "Je suis mélodie"
- 1977: "Il a juste besoin d'un bateau"
- 1977: "Tourne la page"
- 1978: "Pomme"
- 1979: "La clé des coeurs"
