= Supernova (Cir.Cuz song) =

Single by Cir.Cuz featuring Julie Bergan
- Released: November 30, 2012
- Recorded: 2012
- Genre: Hip hop; pop
- Length: 3:54
- Label: Cosmos Music Group
- Songwriter(s): Jesper Borgen, Magnus Clausen, Mats Melbye, Thomas Pedersen

Cir.Cuz singles chronology
| "Gatelys" (2012) | "Supernova" (2012) | "Tidløs" (2013) |

Julie Bergan singles chronology
| "Supernova" (2012) | "Younger" (2014) |

"Supernova" is a song by Norwegian pop and rap duo Cir.Cuz, featuring Julie Bergan. It was released on November 30, 2012, as a digital download in Norway. The song peaked at number 5 on the Norwegian Singles Chart.

== Music video ==
A music video to accompany the release of "Supernova" was first released onto YouTube on December 27, 2012 at a total length of three minutes and fifty-five seconds.

== Track listing ==
Digital download
| No. | Title | Length |
|---|---|---|
| 1. | "Supernova" (feat. Julie Bergan) | 3:54 |

== Chart performance ==
| Chart (2013) | Peak position |
|---|---|
| Norway (VG-lista) | 5 |

== Certifications ==
Certifications for "Supernova"
| Region | Certification | Certified units/sales |
|---|---|---|
| Norway (IFPI Norway) | 14× Platinum | 140,000^{‡} |
| Sweden (GLF) | Gold | 20,000^{‡} |
Streaming
| Norway (IFPI Norway) | 3× Platinum | 9,000,000^{†} |
^{‡} Sales+streaming figures based on certification alone.^{†} Streaming-only figures based on certification alone.

== Release history ==
| Region | Date | Format | Label |
|---|---|---|---|
| Norway | November 30, 2012 | Digital download | Cosmos Music Group |
