= Det var en gång en fågel =

Single by Laser Inc

from the album Roger That!
- Language: Swedish
- Released: 2007
- Label: Warner Music Sweden
- Songwriter: Laser Inc
- Producer: Laser Inc

Laser Inc singles chronology
"Det var en gång en fågel" (2007)	"När man var liten" (2008)

"Det var en gång en fågel" is the debut single by Swedish band Laser Inc, which was released in 2007 by Warner Music Sweden. The song has peaked at number 6 on the Swedish singles chart.

== Track listing ==
CD single
No.	Title	Length
1.	"Det var en gång en fågel (Radio Edit)"	3:36
2.	"Det var en gång en fågel (Teeque Remix)"	4:20
3.	"Det var en gång en fågel (Primetime Remix)"	4:36
4.	"Det var en gång en fågel (Extended)"	4:28
5.	"Det var en gång en fågel (Stian Remix)"	3:43

== Music video ==
Music video was uploaded on 11 January 2011 by Extensive Music on YouTube.

== Charts ==
=== Weekly charts ===
Chart (2007)	Peak position
Sweden (Sverigetopplistan)	6
Finland (Suomen virallinen lista)	11

=== Year-end charts ===
Chart (2007)	Position
Sweden (Sverigetopplistan)	58

== Release history ==
Region	Year	Format	Label
Sweden	2007	CD single	Warner Music Sweden
