= Bulwer-Lytton Fiction Contest =

Tongue-in-cheek writing contest

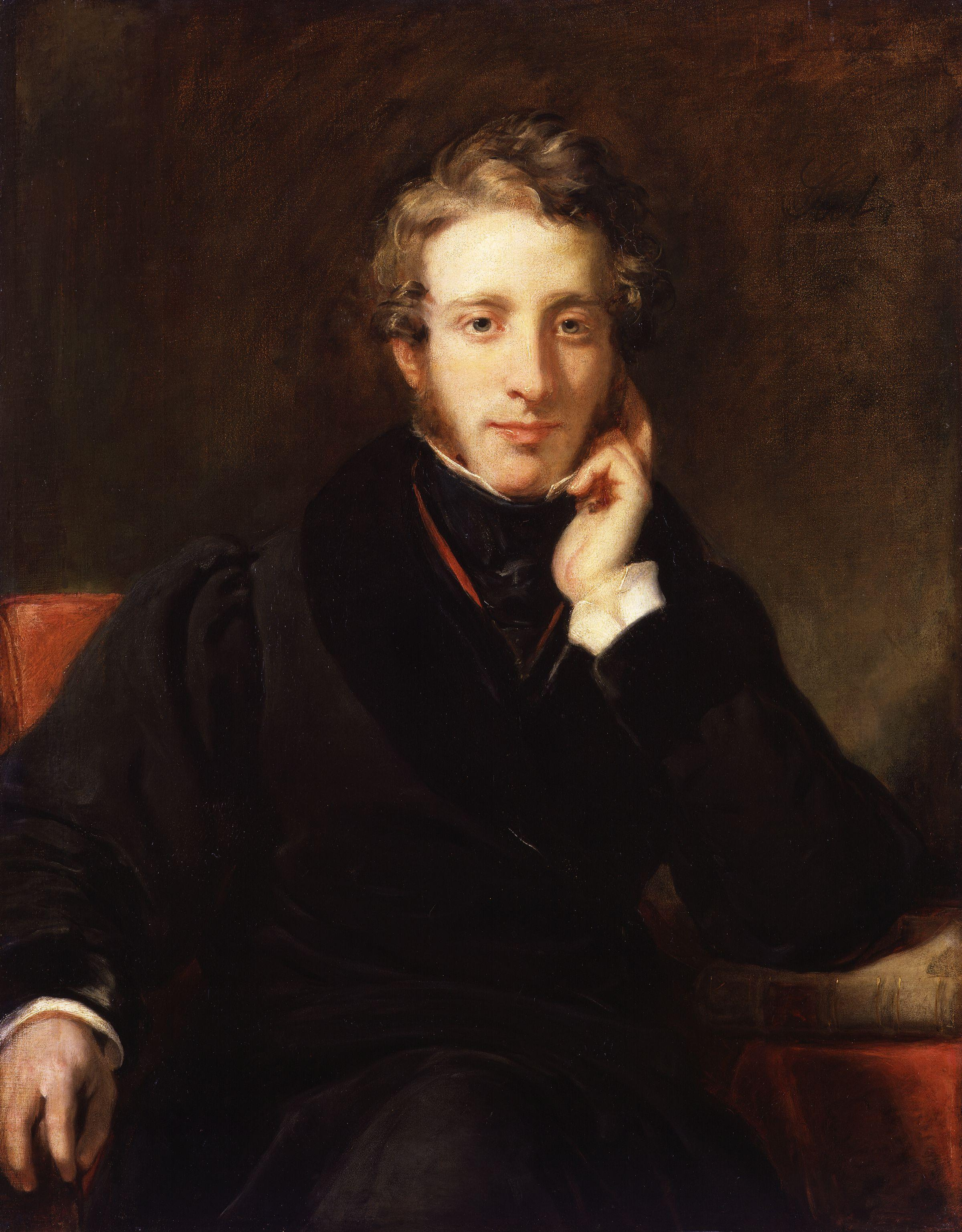
Portrait of Edward Bulwer-Lytton, by Henry William Pickersgill, 1831

The Bulwer-Lytton Fiction Contest (BLFC) was a tongue-in-cheek contest, held annually and sponsored by the English Department of San José State University in San Jose, California until 2025. Entrants were invited "to compose the opening sentence to the worst of all possible novels" – that is, one which was deliberately bad.

According to the official rules, the prize for winning the contest was "a pittance". The 2008 winner received $250, while the 2014 winners' page said the grand prize winner received "about $150". In 2023, the prize was "a cheap certificate and bragging rights".

The contest was started in 1982 by Professor Scott E. Rice of the English Department at San Jose State University and was named for English novelist and playwright Edward George Bulwer-Lytton, author of the much-quoted first line "It was a dark and stormy night". This opening, from the 1830 novel Paul Clifford, reads in full:

It was a dark and stormy night; the rain fell in torrents, except at occasional intervals, when it was checked by a violent gust of wind which swept up the streets (for it is in London that our scene lies), rattling along the housetops, and fiercely agitating the scanty flame of the lamps that struggled against the darkness.

The first year of the competition attracted just three entries, but it went public the next year, received media attention, and attracted 10,000 entries. The contest eventually expanded into several subcategories, such as detective fiction, romance novels, Western novels, and purple prose. Sentences that were notable but not quite bad enough to merit the Grand Prize or a category prize were awarded Dishonorable Mentions.

The contest was discontinued in 2025 by a retired Scott Rice, citing the increasing burden of running it at an older age.

== Winning entrants ==
The winning entries are available at the contest website.

Year	Author
1983	Gail Cain San Francisco, California
1984	Steven Garman Pensacola, Florida
1985	Martha Simpson Glastonbury, Connecticut
1986	Patricia E. Presutti Lewiston, New York
1987	Sheila B. Richter Minneapolis, Minnesota
1988	Rachel E. Sheeley Williamsburg, Indiana
1989	Ray C. Gainey Indianapolis, Indiana
1990	Linda Vernon Newark, California
1991	Judy Frazier Lathrop, Missouri
1992	Laurel Fortuner Montendre, France
1993	Wm. W. "Buddy" Ocheltree Port Townsend, Washington
1994	Larry Brill Austin, Texas
1995	John L. Ashman Houston, Texas
1996	Janice Estey Aspen, Colorado
1997	Artie Kalemeris Fairfax, Virginia
1998	Bob Perry Milton, Massachusetts
1999	Dr. David Chuter Kingston, U.K.
2000	Gary Dahl Los Gatos, California
2001	Sera Kirk Vancouver, British Columbia, Canada
2002	Rephah Berg Oakland, California
2003	Mariann Simms Wetumpka, Alabama
2004	Dave Zobel Manhattan Beach, California
2005	Dan McKay Fargo, North Dakota
2006	Jim Guigli Carmichael, California
2007	Jim Gleeson Madison, Wisconsin
2008	Garrison Spik Washington, D.C.
2009	David McKenzie Federal Way, Washington
2010	Molly Ringle Seattle, Washington
2011	Sue Fondrie Appleton, Wisconsin
2012	Cathy Bryant Manchester, England
2013	Chris Wieloch Brookfield, Wisconsin
2014	Elizabeth Dorfman Bainbridge Island, Washington
2015	Dr. Joel Phillips West Trenton, New Jersey
2016	William Barry Brockett Tallahassee, Florida
2017	Kat Russo Loveland, Colorado
2018	Tanya Menezes San Jose, California
2019	Maxwell Archer Mount Pleasant, Ontario (Note: The Bulwer-Lytton Fiction Contest website does not specify which of the several places known as Mount Pleasant, Ontario, is meant.)
2020	Lisa Kluber San Francisco, California
2021	Stu Duval Auckland, New Zealand
2022	John Farmer Aurora, Colorado
2023	Maya Pasic New York, New York
2024	Lawrence Person Austin, Texas

== Collections ==
Six books collecting the best BLFC entries have been published:

- It Was a Dark and Stormy Night (1984), ISBN 0-14-007556-9
- Son of "It Was a Dark and Stormy Night" (1986), ISBN 0-14-008839-3
- Bride of Dark and Stormy (1988), ISBN 0-14-010304-X
- It Was a Dark & Stormy Night: The Final Conflict (1992), ISBN 0-14-015791-3
- Dark and Stormy Rides Again (1996), ISBN 0-14-025490-0
- It Was a Dark and Stormy Night (2007), ISBN 978-1-905548-60-6

An audio cassette of the winning entries in the BLFC was also released:

- It Was a Dark and Stormy Night (1997), audio cassette, ISBN 1-57270-045-9.

== See also ==
- Lyttle Lytton Contest, a derivative favoring extremely short first sentences
- Purple prose
- Bad Sex in Fiction Award run by Literary Review magazine
- Bookseller/Diagram Prize for Oddest Title of the Year
- International Imitation Hemingway Competition
