= Yuka Masaki =

Yuka Masaki 真崎 ゆか
- Born: Yuka Yamazaki; 4 March 1986 (age 40); Saitama Prefecture, Japan
- Genres: J-pop; R&B
- Occupation: Singer
- Years active: 2009–present
- Label: Universal Music Japan
- Website: www.yukamasaki.com

Yuka Masaki (真崎 ゆか, Masaki Yuka), born 4 March 1986, is a Japanese J-Pop and R&B singer.

Born Yuka Yamazaki (山崎 友 加, Yamazaki Yuka) in Saitama Prefecture, she began her career in 2009 when she signed with the music company Universal Music Japan her first recording contract.

== Biography ==
Masaki played since middle school to high school as a handball player in her school club, being even selected in the U-16 Junior Team of Japan. After high school she attended a music school in Tokyo, where she became interested in African-American music.

After her graduation, she took her first steps as a singer performing in clubs and concert halls in Tokyo. With an average of ten appearances per month Masaki attracted attention from Japanese and even Korean record companies, until she finally signed her contract with Universal Music Japan.

On 16 February 2011, she released her first single, "Last Kiss", a duet with the Japanese singer KG.

== Discography ==
=== Albums ===
- [2011.09.21] - Love Space
- [2012.08.08] - Tears of Heart

=== Singles ===
- [2011.02.16] Last Kiss feat. KG (#19 RIAJ, #90 Oricon Chart)
- [2011.04.27] Motto Aishitakatta (もっと愛したかった; I Wanted to Love You More) (#13 RIAJ, #113 Oricon Chart)
- [2011.07.20] Lady Luck
- [2011.08.17] Change Myself (#147 Oricon Chart)
- [2012.03.14] Negai feat. K.J.
- [2012.07.04] Sweet Pain feat. Shion
