= Tudo É Rouge =

Promotional single by Rouge
- Released: 3 November 2013
- Recorded: 2012
- Genre: EDM; dance-pop
- Length: 3:16
- Label: Midas Music
- Songwriters: Aline Wirley; Fantine Thó; Karin Hils; Patrícia Lissa; Rick Bonadio
- Producer: Rick Bonadio

"Tudo é Rouge" (lit.: "It's All Rouge") is a song by the Brazilian girl group Rouge, released as a promotional single on April 15, 2013, the first release in 8 years. The song, composed by members of the group, along with Rick Bonadio, who also produced it, was the fruit of a meeting with the producer for his reality show Fábrica de Estrelas. "Tudo É Rouge" is a pop song, also deriving from dance-pop and EDM.

The song talks about the power of the group, and how it hits the people around. Critics received the song with positive reviews, highlighting the dancing side of the song and the maturing of the group. Launched just as streaming on SoundCloud, the song was not sent to the radio, and had no digital release on iTunes, as the group was not released from its former label to market the name.

== Background ==
I just spoke to Pati on the phone. We are very happy with all that is happening. Mainly because it's Rick who started the whole mess on Twitter."

— Aline Wirley talking about the possibility of returning the group.

After the group ended in 2006, the 4 girls followed their professional careers, but with a desire to finish the group in a "dignified" way. After years of fans requests in October 2012, it was speculated via Twitter that the girls' producer, Rick Bonadio, started a Twitter movement on the weekend with the hashtag #voltarouge (back rouge). The objective of Bonadio would be to present the fans with the commemoration of the 10 years of the feminine band with, perhaps, the recording of a DVD and a tour by Brazil. Rick Bonadio said that he talked to Karin first and after talking about the schedule and the coming of Fantine to Brazil for the recordings, all the girls loved the idea. Karin Hils said, "There was such a big demonstration on the internet that we started to think about this. It was this affection that clicked and made us think about the possibility. If it were just for us, it was not going to roll over It's a very big rush, but I'm loving it."

On November 3 and 4, 2012, the four girls got together at the Midas studio to compose and record two songs, "Tudo é Rouge" and "Tudo Se Vez". This process of recording and reuniting would be shown later in 2013 on the Bonadio reality show entitled Fábrica de Estrelas, and screened by Multishow. Luciana Andrade also received the invitation but did not accept. we received Rick's invitation for this return and we were very happy with the opportunity to relive and celebrate this story, "says Aline." It's an honor to know that we were part of the Brazilian pop, and the sensation is of go back in time, a second chance to work better, sing better, "said Fantine, who came from the Netherlands, where she currently lives with her husband and daughter, Cristine, for the recording.

== Composition ==
"I believe that now there is much of who we are today, than we have become. The songs follow exactly what we want to print for people. And it's very good because we're going to sing what people are expecting and what we want to say. Right now, we've been able to find the right way to say what we're feeling."

— Patricia Lissa talking about the new songs of Rouge.

"Tudo É Rouge" was composed by the girls of the group, Aline Wirley, Fantine Thó, Karin Hils and Patricia Lissa, along with Rick Bonadio, who produced it. It's a dance-pop song with electronic beats.

As seen in the program, Rick Bonadio released a dancing base and Fantine began to make a melody, thus creating the song. The lyric concept of the song came from the member Patrícia, who, even though she could not be in the composition process, because of the show Priscilla, the Queen of the Desert, suggested that the concept of the song should start with the idea of "painting the city of rouge, rouge was a concept, to be rouge, rouge to be a vibe. " From the idea of Patrícia, Bonadio had the idea to suggest that "everything is rouge", thus giving, not only the name of the song, but the initial kick to the letter. From there, Bonadio continued the process of composing the song, with Fantine and Aline. Karin was the last to come, giving several ideas, including the idea of putting a reference to the hit "Ragatanga."

The first stanza of the song is sung by Fantine, saying that everywhere people have the glitter in their eyes, followed by Aline, who says that no matter the time or place, the brightness of the color, rouge, will never erase. Karin says, "I came here and today I know who I am," while Fantine says, "I crossed the seven seas to be with you" (since she came from the Netherlands for recording), Aline adds that her faith has transformed her, and Patricia he sings, "I know what I had written already." In the chorus, the girls sing, "Everything is Rouge, my way of life, just look inside that you will see, Everything is Rouge, this is the reality, you asked, the Rouge invaded the city."

== Release & Preview ==
On Sunday, 4, it was announced that one of the songs the group had recorded would be called "Tudo é Rouge". Only on April 4, 2013, a preview of the song was released. Already on April 8, the song was released in full, after the episode of Fábrica de Estrelas, which was attended by the girls. The song was released through streaming on SoundCloud, not being released on radio or iTunes, even so, the song was played more than 120,000 times in just one day, only on SoundCloud.

== Critical reception ==
The song received positive reviews. For the site Papel Pop, "The song, which has production by Rick Bonadio, is a classic 'hit-and-run', which should take care of the country's dance floors." For the PopLine Redaction, is Rouge 'abusing synthesizers without losing the essence of the group formed in the now extinct Pop Star reality show for more than ten years. Saying that "the great surprise of the song is an interlude in reference to the hit 'Ragatanga' with the sticky passages 'Aserehe ra'." Already to Veja magazine site, "Dançante to say arrives in an electronic pop mood of those good radio, the song has a hint of a hit and brings a chorus that sounds like a message to the most dedicated fans." For O Povo Online site, "Rouge came back ripe and ready for the tracks!. As for Romário Marques from Não Me Entenda Mal, the song is "dance and good-hair, while causing a feeling of nostalgia for the fans, arousing happiness and joy to have the band back after 8 years of hiatus."

== Music video ==
As there was no official music video, the first version of the video was a "recording video," which shows images of the girls' reunion, the process of creating the song and also scenes of music being recorded in the studio. The music video had over 90,000 hits, in just one YouTube account.

=== Lyric Video ===
The group also made available a song lyric video on the official YouTube channel. In it, besides the letter of the music in full, it is possible to check also the new logo of the group that highlights the gold and precious stones. The lyric video already has more than 163 thousand hits.
