= Diva (Cir.Cuz song) =

Single by Cir.Cuz

from the album Alt I Sin Tid
- Released: 17 October 2011
- Recorded: 2011
- Genre: Pop
- Length: 3:09
- Label: Cosmos Music Group

Cir.Cuz singles chronology
| "Den Eneste" (2011) | "Diva" (2011) | "Gatelys" (2012) |

"Diva" is a song by Norwegian hip-hop/rap duo Cir.Cuz from their debut studio album Alt I Sin Tid. It was released on 17 October 2011 as a digital download in Norway. The song peaked at number 20 on the Norwegian Singles Chart.

== Music video ==
A music video to accompany the release of "Diva" was first released onto YouTube on 8 November 2011 at a total length of three minutes and six seconds. The video was directed by Frederic Esnault and produced by Eivind Taksrud.

== Track listing ==
Digital download
| No. | Title | Length |
|---|---|---|
| 1. | "Diva" | 3:09 |

== Chart performance ==
| Chart (2011) | Peak position |
|---|---|
| Norway (VG-lista) | 20 |

== Certifications ==
Certifications for "Diva"
| Region | Certification | Certified units/sales |
|---|---|---|
| Norway (IFPI Norway) | 2× Platinum | 20,000^{*} |
^{*} Sales figures based on certification alone.

== Release history ==
| Region | Date | Format | Label |
|---|---|---|---|
| Norway | 17 October 2011 | Digital download | Cosmos Music Group |

== See also ==
- "Radio"
