= Emila =

Emila is a given name. Notable people with the name include:

- Emila (singer), Norwegian singer
- Emila Huch (born 1951), Samoan weightlifter
- Emila Medková, née Emila Tláskalová (1928–1985), Czech photographer

== See also ==
- Emil (given name)
- Emilia (given name)
