= Radio (Cir.Cuz song) =

Single by Cir.Cuz

from the album Alt I Sin Tid
- Released: 28 February 2011
- Recorded: 2010–11
- Genre: Hip-Hop / Rap
- Length: 3:20
- Label: Cosmos Music Group

Cir.Cuz singles chronology
"Radio" (2011)	"Den Eneste" (2011)

"Radio" is a song by Norwegian hip-hop/rap duo Cir.Cuz from their debut studio album Alt I Sin Tid. It was released on 28 February 2011 as a digital download in Norway. The song has peaked at number 2 on the Norwegian Singles Chart.

== Track listing ==
Digital download
No.	Title	Length
1.	"Radio"	3:20

== Chart performance ==
Chart (2011)	Peak position
Norway (VG-lista)	2

== Certifications ==
Certifications for "Radio"
Region	Certification	Certified units/sales
Norway (IFPI Norway)	5× Platinum	50,000^{*}
^{*} Sales figures based on certification alone.

== Release history ==
Region	Date	Format	Label
Norway	28 February 2011	Digital download	Cosmos Music Group

== See also ==
- "Diva"
