= Purple prose =

Overly ornate and distracting prose

In literary criticism, purple prose is overly ornate prose text that may disrupt a narrative flow by drawing undesirable attention to its own extravagant style of writing, thereby diminishing the appreciation of the prose overall. Purple prose is characterized by the excessive use of adjectives, adverbs, and metaphors. When it is limited to certain passages, they may be termed purple patches or purple passages, standing out from the rest of the work.

Purple prose is criticized for desaturating the meaning in an author's text by overusing melodramatic and fanciful descriptions. As there is no precise rule or absolute definition of what constitutes purple prose, deciding if a text, passage, or complete work has fallen victim is subjective. According to Paul West, "It takes a certain amount of sass to speak up for prose that's rich, succulent and full of novelty. Purple is immoral, undemocratic and insincere; at best artsy, at worst the exterminating angel of depravity."

== Origins ==
The term purple prose is derived from a reference by the Roman poet Horace (Quintus Horatius Flaccus, 65–8 BC) who wrote in his Ars Poetica (lines 14–21):

Inceptis grauibus plerumque et magna professis
purpureus, late qui splendeat, unus et alter
adsuitur pannus, cum lucus et ara Dianae
et properantis aquae per amoenos ambitus agros
aut flumen Rhenum aut pluuius describitur arcus;
sed nunc non erat his locus. Et fortasse cupressum
scis simulare; quid hoc, si fractis enatat exspes
nauibus, aere dato qui pingitur?

Translation:

Weighty openings and grand declarations often
Have one or two purple patches tacked on, that gleam
Far and wide, when Diana's grove and her altar,
The winding stream hastening through lovely fields,
Or the river Rhine, or the rainbow's being described.
There's no place for them here. Perhaps you know how
To draw a cypress tree: so what, if you've been given
Money to paint a sailor plunging from a shipwreck
In despair?

== See also ==
- Bulwer-Lytton Fiction Contest, to find "the opening sentence to the worst of all possible novels"
- Concision, a communication principle of eliminating redundancy
- Description, one of four rhetorical modes, along with exposition, argumentation, and narration
- Elegant variation, unnecessary use of synonyms
- Euphuism, deliberate excess of literary devices fashionable in 1580s English prose
- Order of the Occult Hand, a group of journalists who sneak the phrase "It was as if an occult hand had…" into published copy
- Verbosity, in which a speech or writing uses more words than is necessary
