= Luke Christopher =

American rapper

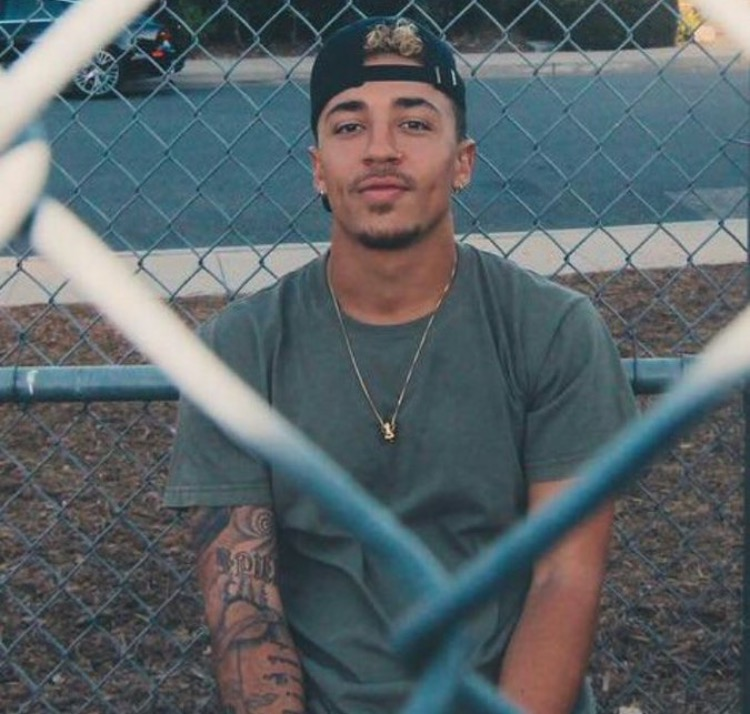

Background information
- Born: Luke Christopher Hubbard; May 8, 1993 (age 33); Los Angeles, California
- Origin: Los Angeles, California
- Genres: Hip hop; pop
- Occupations: Rapper; singer-songwriter; producer
- Years active: 2015–present
- Label: ByStorm Entertainment / RCA
- Website: Luke Christopher official website

Luke Christopher Hubbard (born May 8, 1993) is an American rapper, singer, producer and songwriter. Known as Luke Christopher, he is signed to ByStorm Entertainment / RCA.

== Early life ==
Luke Christopher was born in Van Nuys, CA. He grew up in the San Fernando Valley and in Westlake Village, California. As a teenager, he started making songs in his room from scratch. After graduating from high school, he was accepted by the University of Southern California, but he did not attend due to the fact that he was offered a record deal by Interscope Records his senior year of high school.

== Career ==
Early on in his career, Christopher was discovered by Music Executive Ron Fair and Jimmy Iovine his senior year of high school. Before releasing his first mixtape, Christopher had released several songs. On January 1, 2012, he released his debut mixtape, titled Building Skies. The music was compared to Drake's by musical website Breakonacloud.com. On July 6, 2012 he released TMRW, TMRW, a mixtape that began to make waves in Los Angeles.

In 2013 he signed a record agreement with ByStorm Entertainment / RCA by Mark Pitts and Peter Edge. On September 30, 2014 he landed a new mixtape titled TMRW, TMRW Pt. II. Most of the mixtape's fifteen tracks were produced by Luke himself. On January 24, 2015 Christopher's song "Lot to Learn" entered the Billboard Twitter Emerging Artists Charts at 28.

On September 11, 2015, Christopher released a double EP, YSTRDY and TMRW. While YSTRDY contains remastered songs from old projects, TMRW features new content including the hit single "They Know". After its debut on iTunes, TMRW immediate positioned itself in the Top 100 albums in the Hip-Hop/Rap category. His song Roses from the TMRW was subsequently featured in the Galaxy S7 ad campaign.

On July 28, 2017 he published his first studio album "TMRWFRVR" including 15 songs, one of which was a copy of the 2015 hit song from the album "TMRW", "Lot to Learn" (ByStorm Entertainment and RCA).

On August 10, 2018, Christopher released the first single of his project "THE RENAISSANCE" called 'TROUBLE'. This began the weekly releasing of new singles from this project. The project ended on August 1, 2019, after he released the final song from the project 'BIG HEADED'. By the end of the project, he had released 52 songs.

== Discography ==
=== Studio albums ===
List of studio albums
Title	Album details
TMRWFRVR	Released: July 28, 2017; Label: ByStorm Entertainment, RCA; Format: Digital download

=== Extended plays ===
- TMRW (2015)

=== Mixtapes ===
List of mixtapes
Title	Album details
Building Skies	Released: January 1, 2012; Label: self-produced; Format: Digital download
TMRW, TMRW	Released: July 6, 2012; Label: self-produced; Format: Digital download
The Wonder Years Pt.1	Released: October 30, 2013; Label: ByStorm Entertainment, RCA; Format: Digital download
TMRW, TMRW Pt. II	Released: September 30, 2014; Label: ByStorm Entertainment, RCA; Format: Digital download

=== Singles ===
Title	Year	Peak chart positions							Album
Title	Year	AUS	AUT	GER	ITA	NED	NOR	SWE	Album
"Life Jackets"	2014	—	—	—	—	—	—	—	Non-album singles
"Ms. Holy Water"	2014	—	—	—	—	—	—	—	Non-album singles
"They Know"	2015	—	—	—	—	—	—	—	TMRW
"Upside Down"	2015	—	—	—	—	—	—	—	Non-album singles
"Plans"	2015	—	—	—	—	—	—	—	Non-album singles
"Lot to Learn"	2016	26	32	36	43	59	25	27	TMRW
"Changed Me"	2016	—	—	—	—	—	—	—	Non-album single
"Waterfalls"	2017	—	—	—	—	—	—	—	TMRWFRVR
