= Once upon a time =

Opening line of fairytales

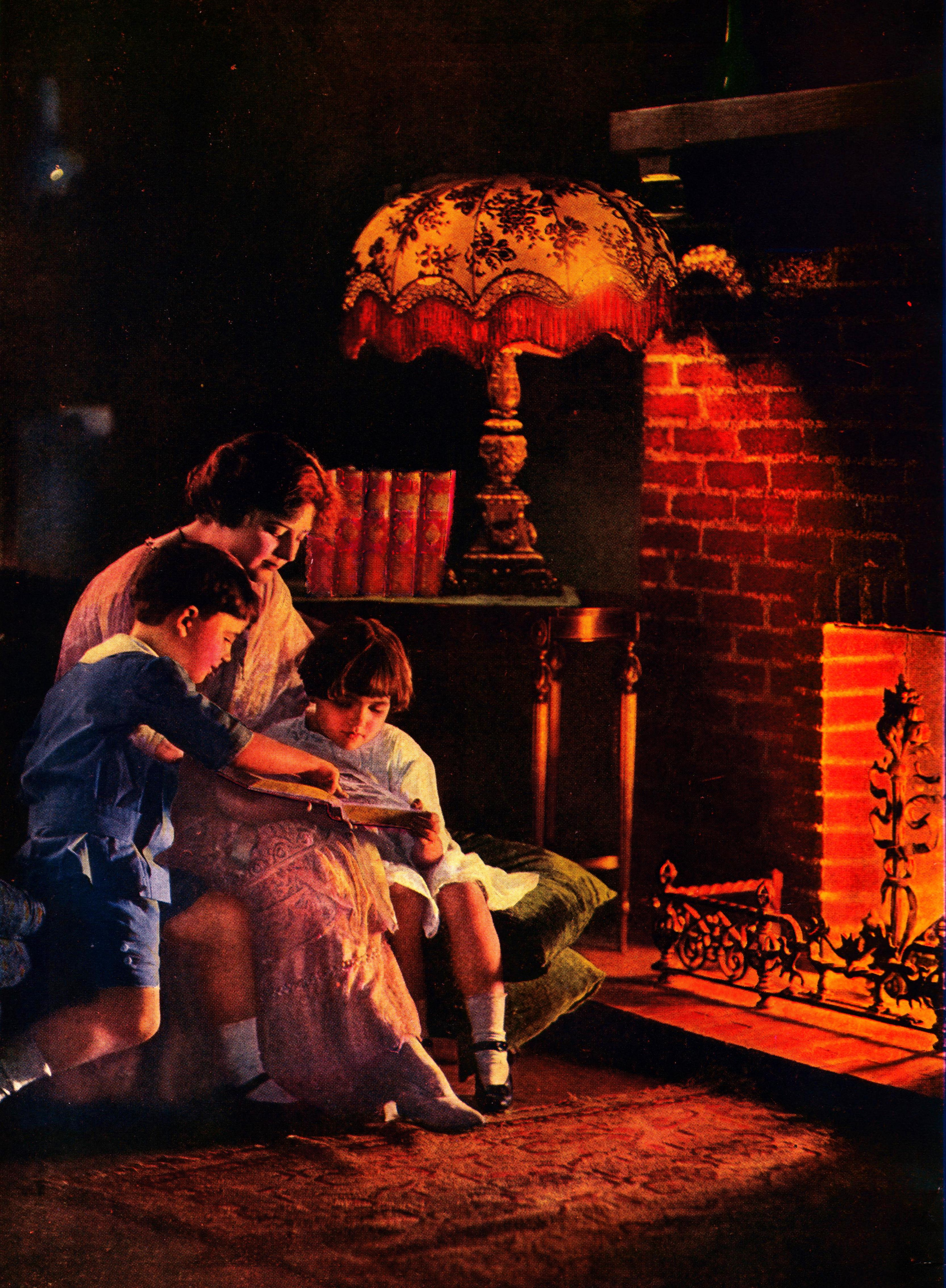
Frontispiece to The How and Why Library, 1909

"Once upon a time" is a stock phrase used to introduce a narrative of past events, typically in fairy tales and folk tales. It has been used in some form since at least 1380 in storytelling in the English language and has started many narratives since 1600. These stories sometimes end with "and they all lived happily ever after", or, originally, "happily until their deaths".

The phrase is common in fairy tales for younger children. It was used in the original translations of the stories of Charles Perrault as a translation for the French "il était une fois", of Hans Christian Andersen as a translation for the Danish "der var engang" (literally "there was once"), the Brothers Grimm as a translation for the German "es war einmal" (literally "it was once") and Joseph Jacobs in English translations and fairy tales.

In More English Fairy Tales, Joseph Jacobs notes that:

The opening formula are varied enough, but none of them has much play of fancy. 'Once upon a time and a very good time it was, though it wasn't in my time nor in your time nor in any one else's time.' is effective enough for a fairy epoch, and is common, according to Mayhew (London Labour, III), among tramps.

The phrase is also used in retellings of myths, fables and folklore.

== See also ==
- In the beginning (phrase)
- All's Well That Ends Well
- Happy ending
- It was a dark and stormy night
