= Martin Tungevaag =

Norwegian DJ and music producer

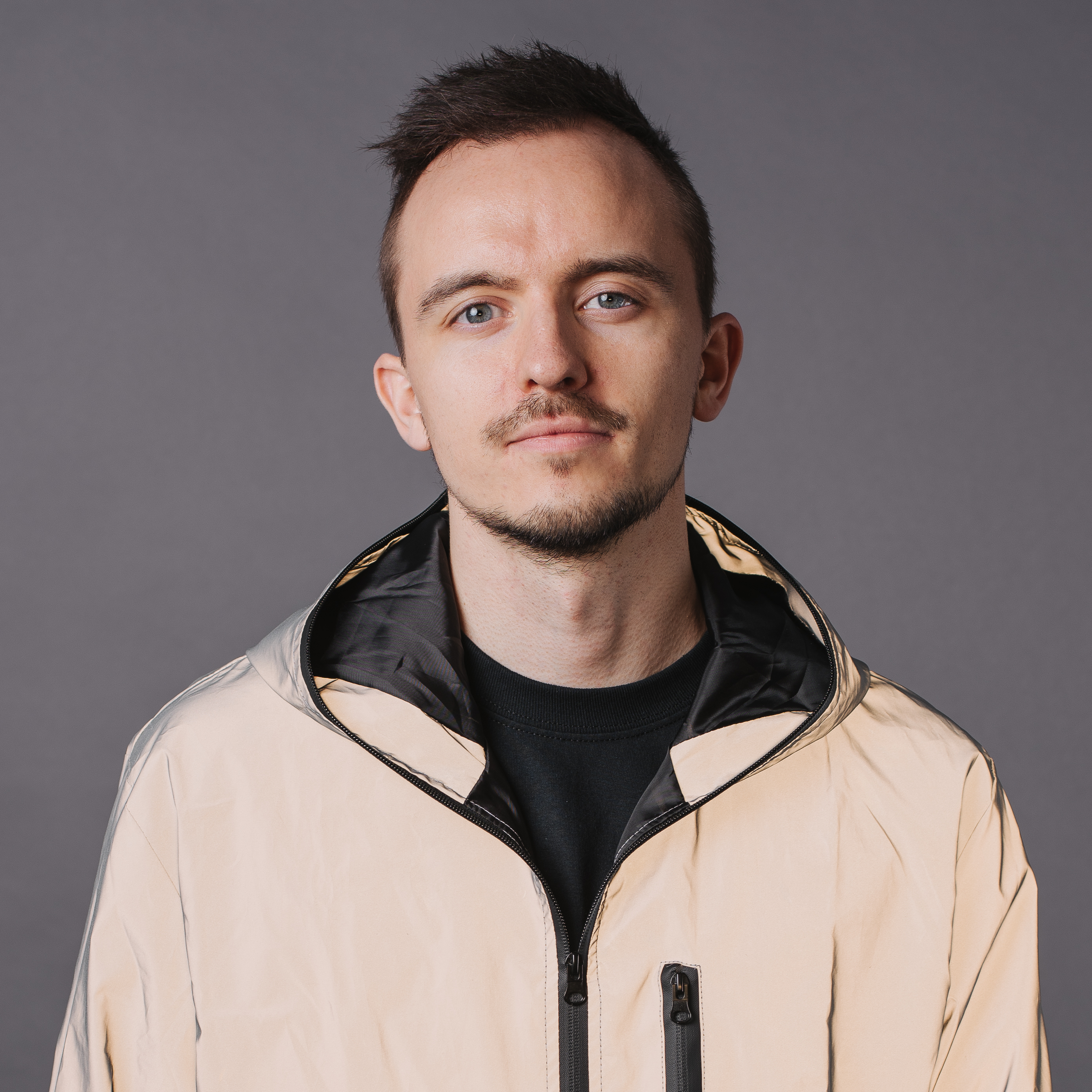

Background information
- Born: Martin Tungevåg; 9 July 1993 (age 33); Alesund, Norway
- Genres: Dance; EDM
- Occupations: Musician; DJ; record producer
- Years active: 2007–present
- Labels: Spinnin'; Kontor; Armada Music; Ultra Music; Warner Music; Sony Music
- Website: tungevaag.com

Martin Tungevåg (born July 9, 1993), known professionally as Martin Tungevaag or simply Tungevaag, is a Norwegian DJ and music producer who peaked at number #73 on the DJ Mag top 100 DJs list in 2023. He has achieved success in Europe, Asia and South America with the electronic songs "Samsara 2015", "Wicked Wonderland", "All for Love", "Bad Boy", "Dance", "Peru" and "Play" together with K-391, Alan Walker and Mangoo. He has been nominated at the Norwegian Spellemannprisen twice times: for Hit of the Year in 2015 with "Samsara 2015"; in the same category in 2020 with "Dance"; and for Best EDM Artist in 2019 at the Swedish Grammis. Tungevaag has over four billion worldwide streams on his music and received several gold and platinum certifications in several countries. He was ranked #84 on DJ Mag's Top 100. in 2024.

== Career ==
At the age of 15, Tungevaag began to explore different digital audio workstations (DAW) in his bedroom studio in 2008. On 12 June 2014, he signed with and started his music career at Kontor Records in Germany, scoring his first major hit in 2014 with "Wicked Wonderland". It became a summer hit and led to shows at clubs and festival main stages all over Europe. "Wicked Wonderland" was later certified platinum in Germany, Switzerland, Austria and Spain, quadruple platinum in Norway, as well as triple platinum in Sweden and Finland. In topped the chart in Austria and has over 130 million streams on Spotify.

In 2018, Tungevaag released "All for Love" through Warner Music and in 2019 "Million Lights" through Spinnin' Records. Later in the same year he worked with Alan Walker, K-391 and Mangoo on a remake of Mangoo's "Eurodancer" known as "Play". The single was released on 30 August 2019, was streamed over 760 thousand times on its day of release on Spotify, later reached the upper ranks of the charts in Norway, México, Sweden and Finland.

Tungevaag's track "Dance", made in collaboration with CLMD, received radio support and was streamed over 70 million times on Spotify in its first year. It was also nominated as for Hit of the Year at both the Spellemann (Norwegian Grammys) and at P3 Gull, the biggest Norwegian radio station. It was certified gold in Denmark, platinum in Sweden and double platinum in Norway.

His track "Miss You", released through Spinnin', debuted on the Dutch Top 40 at number 37, reaching number 19 on 16 April 2021.

== Discography ==
=== Singles ===
Year	Single	Peak positions									Certifications
Year	Single	NOR	AUT	DEN	FIN	FRA	GER	NL	SWE	SWI	Certifications
2014	"Wicked Wonderland"	4	1	—	5	9	6	—	2	21	IFPI NOR: 3× Platinum; BVMI: Platinum
2014	"Vidorra"	—	—	—	—	—	72	—	21	—	IFPI NOR: 3× Platinum; GLF: Platinum
2015	"Samsara 2015"	2	7	8	1	—	—	—	4	—	IFPI NOR: 4× Platinum; GLF: 3× Platinum; IFPI AUT: Platinum; IFPI DEN: Platinum
2015	"Springfield" (with ItaloBrothers)	22	—	—	3	—	—	—	51	—	IFPI NOR: 3× Platinum
2019	"Play" (with K-391 and Alan Walker featuring Mangoo)	2	44	—	11	—	—	—	25	78	IFPI NOR: 2× Platinum
2019	"Dance" (with CLMD)	12	—	—	—	—	—	—	37	—	IFPI NOR: 3× Platinum; IFPI DEN: Platinum
2019	"Knockout"	22	—	—	—	—	—	—	—	—	IFPI NOR: Platinum; GLF: Gold
2020	"Peru"	—	—	—	—	—	—	—	—	—	IFPI NOR: Gold; GLF: Gold
2020	"Stay" (with The Second Level featuring Mvrt)	—	—	—	—	—	—	—	—	—	
2020	"Make You Happy" (featuring Richard Smitt)	—	—	—	—	—	—	—	—	—	
2020	"The Night" (with bby ivy)	—	—	—	—	—	—	—	—	—	
2020	"Afterparty" (with Rat City featuring Rich the Kid)	—	—	—	—	—	—	—	—	—	
2020	"Miss You" (with Sick Individuals and Marf)	—	—	—	—	—	—	19	—	—	
2020	"Kingdoms" (with Jay Hardway)	—	—	—	—	—	—	—	—	—	
2021	"Woke Up in India"	—	—	—	—	—	—	—	—	—	
2021	"Famous" (with Vlade Kay and Jonth featuring Skinny Days)	—	—	—	—	—	—	—	—	—	
2021	"Young Summer"	—	—	—	—	—	—	—	—	—	
2021	"Ride with Me" (featuring Kid Ink)	—	—	—	—	64	—	—	—	—	SNEP: Gold
2021	"Paper Planes" (with Lucas & Steve)	—	—	—	—	—	—	22	—	—	
2021	"Written in the Stars" (with Bassjackers)	—	—	—	—	—	—	—	—	—	
2021	"Close Your Eyes" (with Kshmr)	—	—	—	—	—	—	—	—	—	
2021	"Electrified" (with Voster & Gallardo and Aloma Steele)	—	—	—	—	—	—	—	—	—	
2022	"In My Zone"	—	—	—	—	—	—	—	—	—	
2022	"When & Where"	—	—	—	—	—	—	—	—	—	
2022	"With My Friends" (with Sick Individuals and Philip Strand)	—	—	—	—	—	—	—	—	—	
2022	"Love Me Anyway" (with Faustix)	—	—	—	—	—	—	—	—	—	
2022	"Not The One"	—	—	—	—	—	—	—	—	—	
2022	"Toxic" (with 22Bullets and Mentum)	—	—	—	—	—	—	—	—	—	
2022	"I Knew It Was You" (with Lovespeake)	—	—	—	—	—	—	—	—	—	
2022	"La Danse" (with Timmy Trumpet)	—	—	—	—	—	—	—	—	—	
2023	"Dreams Come True" (with Mike Williams)	—	—	—	—	—	—	—	—	—	
"—" denotes a recording that did not chart or was not released.

As Tungevaag & Raaban:

- 2015: "Samsara"
- 2015: "Parade"
- 2015: "Russian Roulette"
- 2016: "Wolf"
- 2016: "Magical"
- 2016: "Beast" (feat. Isac Elliot)
- 2017: "Wake Up Alone"
- 2017: "Cold Blood"
- 2017: "Coming Up"
- 2018: "All for Love"
- 2018: "Bad Boy"
- 2018: "Hey Baby"
- 2019: "Million Lights"
- 2019: "Try Again"
- 2019: "Take Me Away"

=== Remixes ===
- 2020: Rat City and Kiesza — "Naked (With My Headphones On)" (Tungevaag Remix)
- 2020: Hoved and Tungevaag — "Let You Go" (Tungevaag Edit)

== Awards and nominations ==
Year	Organization	Award	Work	Result	Ref.
2014	MTV Awards	Best Norwegian Act	Martin Tungevaag	Nominated	

Year	Organization	Award	Work	Result	Ref.
2015	Spellemannprisen	Hit of the year	Samsara	Nominated	

Year	Organization	Award	Work	Result	Ref.
2018	MTV Europe Music Awards	Best Norwegian Act	Tungevaag & Raaban	Nominated	

Year	Organization	Award	Work	Result	Ref.
2019	Grammis	Best Electronic Act	All For Love	Nominated	

Year	Organization	Award	Work	Result	Ref.
2019	Musikkforleggerprisen	Best Track	ALL FOR LOVE	Nominated	

Year	Organization	Award	Work	Result	Ref.
2020	NRK P3 Gull	Hit of the year	DANCE	Nominated	

Year	Organization	Award	Work	Result	Ref.
2020	DJ Mag	DJ Mag top 100	Tungevaag	#92	

Year	Organization	Award	Work	Result	Ref.
2021	Luttprisen	Artist of the year	Tungevaag	Won	
