= Alan Walker discography =

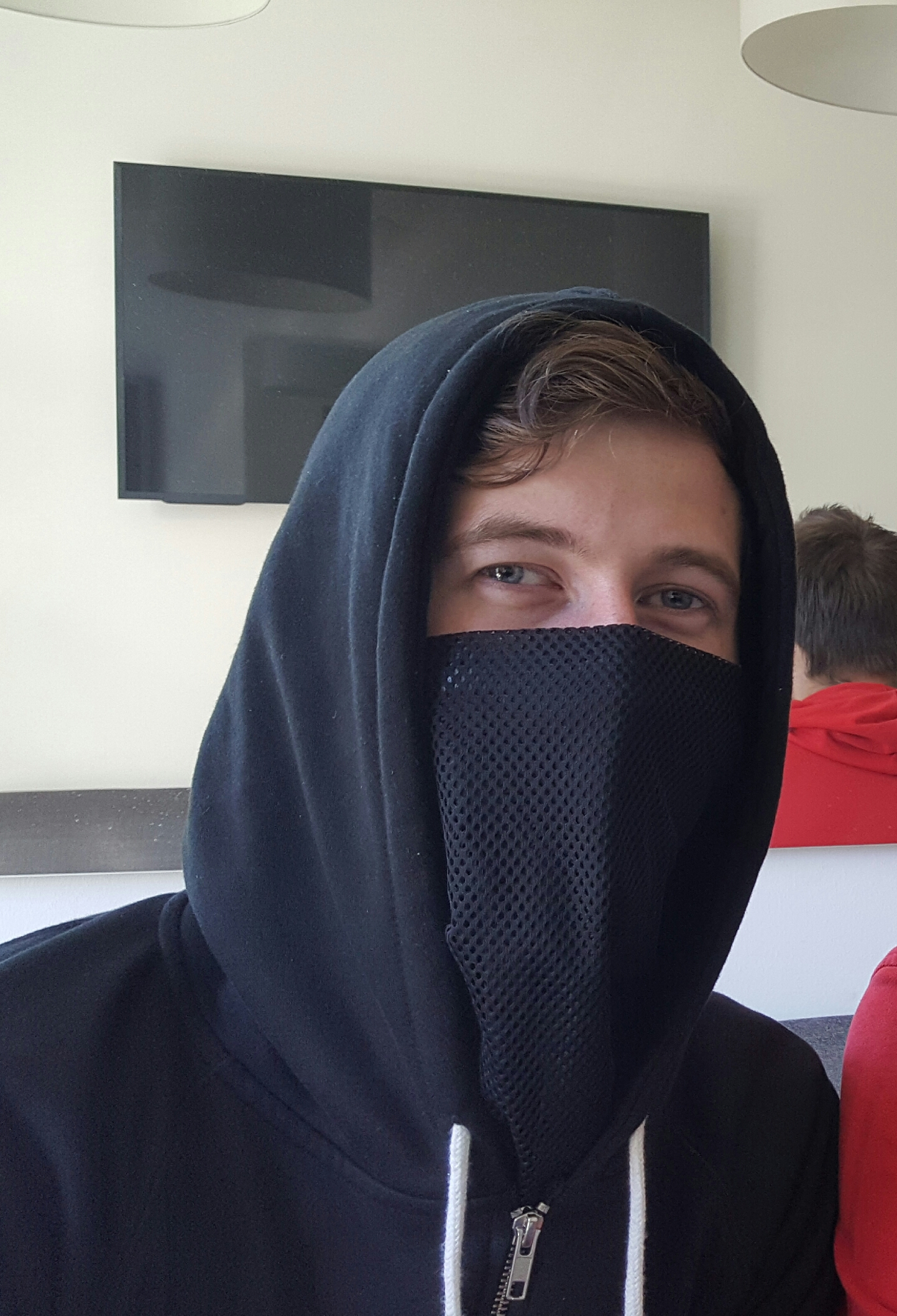
- Alan Walker in 2016
- Studio albums: 5
- EPs: 8
- Singles: 70
- Music videos: 54
- Remixes: 35

The discography of Norwegian DJ, songwriter, and record producer Alan Walker consists of five studio albums, eight extended plays, 70 singles, 35 remixes and 54 music videos. Walker began producing music in 2012 and released his first single "Fade" through NoCopyrightSounds (NCS) in 2014. He subsequently signed with MER Musikk, a subsidiary of Sony Music Sweden, and released the single "Faded" in December 2015. This track is a remake of "Fade", featuring uncredited singer Iselin Solheim. The single reached number one on the annual charts in Austria, Germany, Switzerland, and Sweden, and was certified triple platinum by the Recording Industry Association of America (RIAA). In 2016, he released "Sing Me to Sleep" and "Alone", both of which topped Norwegian VG-lista chart.

In 2018, Walker released his first studio album, Different World. The album reached number one on Norwegian VG-lista chart and number two on Billboard Top Dance Albums chart. The singles from the album, "All Falls Down", "Darkside" and "Diamond Heart" were all certified multi-platinum and reached number one on Norwegian VG-lista chart. It also included earlier singles like "Faded", "Sing Me to Sleep" and "Alone". He was also featured on Norwegian music producer K-391's single "Ignite".

In 2019, Walker released singles including "On My Way", "Play" and "Alone, Pt. II" all of which reached the top 10 on Norwegian charts. His June release "Live Fast" with ASAP Rocky became the theme song for PUBG Mobile Season 8. From 2020 to 2021, he released "Time," "Heading Home", "Fake a Smile" and "Paradise" which were included on his November 2021 album World of Walker.

In 2022, Walker released the Walkerverse project, initially presented as two EPs and later re-released as his third studio album, Walkerverse Pt. I & II. The first EP, Walkerverse Pt. I, featured "Adventure Time" and "Somebody Like U" with Au/Ra. The second EP, Walkerverse Pt. II, contained nine tracks, including "Extremes" with Trevor Daniel and the single "Lovesick" which sampled Brahms' Hungarian Dance No. 5. In November 2023, he released his fourth studio album, Walkerworld. The singles "Hero" and "Better Off (Alone, Pt. III)" from the album both reached number one on the Hungarian radio charts. Additionally, the single "Heart Over Mind" released simultaneously with the album, reached number one on the Belarusian year-end chart and number two on the Russian year-end chart. Their fifth studio album, Walkerworld 2.0, was released in January 2025.

On August 8, Walker announces song called "Old Habits" with Sofia Reyes and Farruko, this song is the final version of the song "Old Habits (Instrumental)" from Walkerworld 2.0, and two weeks later Walker releases "Mi Fe" With Jay Kalyl, David Mugurencia and Frank Miami. In November, Walker releases "Sailing", a song in collaboration with 2013 video game Old School Runescape. A few weeks later, he released the song "Welcome to Lonely Club" with American DJ Steve Aoki as part of the supergroup Lonely Club. And december 5, Walker and Aoki releases Quantum Beats the debut album of Lonely Club; includes 8 songs.

== Studio albums ==
Title	Details	Peak chart positions										Certifications
Title	Details	NOR	AUT	CAN	FIN	GER	JPN	NLD	POL	SWE	SWI	Certifications
Different World	Released: 14 December 2018; Label: MER, Sony; Formats: CD, digital download, streaming	1	59	83	1	39	36	29	31	15	15	IFPI NOR: 3× Platinum; BPI: Gold; GLF: Gold; MC: Platinum; ZPAV: 3× Platinum
World of Walker	Released: 26 November 2021; Label: MER, Sony; Formats: CD, digital download, streaming	4	—	—	24	—	47	—	—	33	32	
Walkerverse Pt. I & II	Released: 25 November 2022; Label: MER Music, Sony; Formats: CD, digital download, streaming	17	—	—	44	—	—	—	—	—	—	
Walkerworld	Released: 10 November 2023; Label: MER; Formats: Digital download, streaming	18	—	—	33	—	—	—	—	—	—	
Walkerworld 2.0	Released: 10 January 2025; Label: Kreatell Music; Formats: Digital download, streaming	14	—	—	—	—	—	—	—	—	—	
World of Walker, Season One: Rise of the Drones	Release date: 27 March 2026; Label: World of Walker Music; Formats: Streaming	51	—	—	—	—	—	—	—	—	—	
"—" denotes a recording that did not chart or was not released in that territory.

== Extended plays ==
Title	Details	Peak chart positions		
Title	Details	FIN	JPN	SWE
Alan Walker Hits	Released: 8 December 2017 (Japan); Label: MER, Sony; Formats: Digital download	—	—	—
Faded Japan	Released: 25 April 2018 (Japan); Label: Sony Music Japan International; Formats: CD, digital download; Track listing: 1. "Faded"; 2. "Alone"; 3. "Tired" (featuring Gavin James); 4. "The Spectre"; 5. "Sing Me to Sleep"; 6. "Routine"; 7. "Faded" (Tiësto's Northern Lights Remix)	—	37	—
Live Fast (Japan Exclusive)	Released: 9 August 2019 (Japan); Label: MER, Sony; Formats: CD, digital download, streaming	—	—	—
Walker Racing League	Released: 10 September 2021; Label: MER, Sony; Formats: Digital download, streaming	19	—	32
Walkerverse Pt. I	Released: 17 June 2022; Label: MER, Sony; Formats: Digital download, streaming	—	—	—
Origins	Released: 1 July 2022; Label: MER, Corite; Formats: Digital download, streaming	—	—	—
Walkerverse Pt. II	Released: 18 November 2022; Label: MER, Sony; Formats: Digital download, streaming	—	—	—
Neon Nights	Released: 7 August 2024; Label: Monstercat; Formats: Digital download, streaming, World Of Walker Website	—	—	—
Quantum Beats	Released: 5 December 2025; Label: World Of Walker Music, DJ KID Millonaire; Formats: Digital download, streaming, World of Walker Website			
"—" denotes a recording that did not chart or was not released in that territory.

== Singles ==
=== As lead artist ===
List of singles as lead artist, with selected chart positions and certifications, showing year released and album name
Title	Year	Peak chart positions										Certifications	Album
Title	Year	NOR	AUS	AUT	FRA	GER	IRE	NLD	SWE	UK	US	Certifications	Album
"Fade"	2014	—	—	—	—	—	—	—	— (Note: "Fade" did not enter the Swedish singles chart, but peaked at number three on the Swedish Heatseekers chart.)	—	—		Origins
"Spectre"	2015	—	—	—	—	—	—	—	—	—	—		Origins
"Force"	2015	—	—	—	—	—	—	—	—	—	—		Origins
"Faded"	2015	1	2	1	1	1	6	2	1	7	80	IFPI NOR: 11× Platinum; ARIA: 7× Platinum; BPI: 3× Platinum; BVMI: 7× Gold; GLF: 13× Platinum; NVPI: Platinum; RIAA: 3× Platinum; SNEP: Gold	Different World
"Sing Me to Sleep"	2016	1	126	4	51	10	—	—	9	95	—	IFPI NOR: 6× Platinum; ARIA: Gold; BVMI: Platinum; GLF: 4× Platinum; RIAA: Gold; SNEP: Gold	Different World
"Routine" (with David Whistle)	2016	—	—	—	—	—	—	—	—	—	—		Different World
"Alone"	2016	1	115	1	89	4	74	53	2	—	—	IFPI NOR: 4× Platinum; ARIA: Gold; BPI: Gold; BVMI: Platinum; GLF: 3× Platinum; RIAA: Gold; SNEP: Platinum	Different World
"Tired" (featuring Gavin James)	2017	5	68	35	—	66	78	—	21	—	—	IFPI NOR: 2× Platinum; ARIA: Gold; BVMI: Gold; GLF: 2× Platinum	Faded Japan EP
"The Spectre"	2017	5	—	14	—	50	—	—	22	—	—	BPI: Silver; BVMI: Gold; GLF: Platinum; SNEP: Gold	Faded Japan EP
"All Falls Down" (with Noah Cyrus and Digital Farm Animals featuring Juliander)	2017	1	95	29	139	75	65	20	4	87	—	ARIA: Gold; BPI: Silver; BVMI: Gold; GLF: 3× Platinum; NVPI: Platinum; RIAA: Gold; SNEP: Gold	Different World
"Darkside" (featuring Au/Ra and Tomine Harket)	2018	1	148	63	—	97	67	32	10	—	—	BPI: Silver; GLF: 2× Platinum; RIAA: Gold; SNEP: Gold	Different World
"Diamond Heart" (featuring Sophia Somajo)	2018	1	—	56	—	89	—	29	11	—	—	GLF: 2× Platinum	Different World
"Different World" (with Sofia Carson and K-391 featuring Corsak)	2018	31	—	—	—	—	—	—	— (Note: "A Different World" did not enter the Swedish Singellista Chart, but peaked at number five on the Swedish Heatseeker Chart.)	—	—	IFPI NOR: Gold; GLF: Gold	Different World
"Are You Lonely" (with Steve Aoki featuring Isák)	2019	19	—	—	—	—	—	—	—	—	—		Neon Future IV
"On My Way" (with Sabrina Carpenter and Farruko)	2019	3	—	—	—	85	—	—	30	—	—	GLF: Platinum	World of Walker
"Live Fast" (with A$AP Rocky)	2019	24	—	—	—	—	—	—	— (Note: "Live Fast" did not enter the Swedish Singellista Chart, but peaked at number 11 on the Swedish Heatseeker Chart.)	—	—		Non-album singles
"Play" (with K-391, Tungevaag and Mangoo)	2019	2	—	44	—	—	—	—	25	—	—	IFPI NOR: 2× Platinum	Non-album singles
"Ghost" (with Au/Ra)	2019	—	—	—	—	—	—	—	—	—	—		Death Stranding: Timefall
"Avem (The Aviation Theme)"	2019	—	—	—	—	—	—	—	—	—	—		Non-album single
"Alone, Pt. II" (with Ava Max)	2019	4	—	45	68	47	—	15	25	—	—	IFPI NOR: 4× Platinum; BVMI: Gold; GLF: Platinum; SNEP: Platinum	World of Walker
"End of Time" (with K-391 and Ahrix)	2020	4	—	—	—	—	—	—	60	—	—	IFPI NOR: Platinum	Non-album single
"Heading Home" (with Ruben)	2020	15	—	—	—	—	—	—	53	—	—		World of Walker
"Time (Alan Walker Remix)" (with Hans Zimmer)	2020	—	—	—	—	—	—	—	—	—	—	BVMI: Gold	World of Walker
"Space Melody (Edward Artemyev)" (with Vize featuring Leony)	2020	—	—	—	—	—	—	—	—	—	—		Walker Racing League
"Sorry" (featuring Isák)	2021	8	—	—	—	—	—	—	83	—	—		World of Walker
"Fake a Smile" (with Salem Ilese)	2021	11	—	—	—	—	—	— (Note: "Fake a Smile" did not enter the Netherlands' Single Top 100 but peaked on the Netherlands' Single Tip Chart at number 28.)	23	—	—		World of Walker
"Believers" (with Conor Maynard)	2021	24	—	—	—	—	—	—	64	—	—		Non-album single
"Sweet Dreams" (with Imanbek)	2021	14	—	—	—	—	—	—	43	—	—		Walker Racing League
"Don't You Hold Me Down" (with Georgia Ku)	2021	19	—	—	—	—	—	—	81	—	—		Walker Racing League
"Running Out of Roses" (with Jamie Miller)	2021	15	—	—	—	—	—	—	78	—	—		Walker Racing League
"Paradise" (with K-391 and Boy in Space)	2021	31	—	—	—	—	—	—	— (Note: "Paradise" did not enter the Swedish Singellista Chart, but peaked at number six on the Swedish Heatseeker Chart.)	—	—		World of Walker
"World We Used to Know" (with Winona Oak)	2021	15	—	—	—	—	—	—	46	—	—		World of Walker
"Man on the Moon" (with Benjamin Ingrosso)	2021	23	—	—	—	—	—	—	12	—	—		World of Walker
"Not You" (with Emma Steinbakken)	2021	—	—	—	—	—	—	—	—	—	—		World of Walker
"Hello World" (with Torine)	2022	11	—	—	—	—	—	—	84	—	—		Walkerverse, Pt. I
"Headlights" (with Alok featuring Kiddo)	2022	15	—	—	—	—	—	—	59	—	—		Non-album single
"The Drum"	2022	16	—	—	—	—	—	—	— (Note: "The Drum" did not enter the Swedish Singellista Chart, but peaked at number nine on the Swedish Heatseeker Chart.)	—	—		Walkerverse, Pt. I
"Unity" (with fans of Alan Walker, credited as The Walkers)	2022	—	—	—	—	—	—	—	—	—	—		Non-album single
"Extremes" (with Trevor Daniel)	2022	—	—	—	—	—	—	—	86	—	—		Walkerverse, Pt. II
"Lovesick" (with Sophie Simmons)	2022	—	—	—	—	—	—	—	—	—	—	IFPI NOR: 2× Platinum	Walkerverse, Pt. II
"Shut Up" (with Upsahl)	2022	—	—	—	—	—	—	—	100	—	—		Walkerverse, Pt. II
"Ritual"	2022	—	—	—	—	—	—	—	—	—	—		Walkerverse, Pt. I & II
"Dreamer"	2023	—	—	—	—	—	—	—	—	—	—		Non-album single
"Hero" (with Sasha Alex Sloan)	2023	27	—	—	—	—	—	— (Note: "Hero" did not enter the Dutch Single Top 100, but peaked at number one on the Single Tip chart.)	— (Note: "Hero" did not enter the Swedish Singellista Chart, but peaked at number five on the Swedish Heatseeker Chart.)	—	—		Walkerworld
"Land of the Heroes" (with Sophie Stray)	2023	—	—	—	—	—	—	—	—	—	—		Walkerworld
"Endless Summer" (with Zak Abel)	2023	—	—	—	—	—	—	—	—	—	—		Walkerworld
"Better Off (Alone, Pt. III)" (with Dash Berlin and Vikkstar)	2023	30	—	—	—	—	—	—	— (Note: "Better Off (Alone, Pt. III)" did not enter the Swedish Singellista Chart, but peaked at number three on the Swedish Heatseeker Chart.)	—	—		Walkerworld
"Heart Over Mind" (with Daya)	2023	—	—	—	—	—	—	—	—	—	—		Walkerworld
"Fire!" (with Yuqi ((G)I-dle) and Jvke)	2023	—	—	—	—	—	—	—	—	—	—		Walkerworld 2.0
"Who I Am" (with Putri Ariani and Peder Elias)	2024	18	—	—	—	—	—	—	—	—	—		Walkerworld 2.0
"Team Side" (with Sofiloud featuring RCB)	2024	—	—	—	—	—	—	—	—	—	—		Non-album single
"Unsure" (with Kylie Cantrall)	2024	—	—	—	—	—	—	—	—	—	—		Walkerworld 2.0
"Barcelona" (with Ina Wroldsen)	2024	19	—	—	—	—	—	—	— (Note: "Barcelona" did not enter the Swedish Singellista Chart, but peaked at number 17 on the Swedish Heatseeker Chart.)	—	—		Walkerworld 2.0
"Wake Up" (with MRD)	2024	—	—	—	—	—	—	—	—	—	—		Neon Nights
"Thick of It All" (with Joe Jonas and Julia Michaels)	2024	—	—	—	—	—	—	—	—	—	—		Walkerworld 2.0
"Children of the Sun" (with Pritam and Vishal Mishra)	2024	—	—	—	—	—	—	—	—	—	—		Walkerworld 2.0
"When I Grow Up (Young, Wild, & Free)" (with Flo Rida)	2024	—	—	—	—	—	—	—	—	—	—		Non-album single
"Avalon" (with Anne Gudrun)	2024	—	—	—	—	—	—	—	—	—	—		Walkerworld 2.0
"Dancing in Love" (with Meek)	2024	—	—	—	—	—	—	—	—	—	—		Walkerworld 2.0
"Forever Young"	2025	—	—	—	—	—	—	—	—	—	—		Walkerworld 2.0
"Dust" (with Robin Packalen)	2025	—	—	—	—	—	—	—	—	—	—		Non-album single
"Mind of a Warrior" (with Sorana)	2025	—	—	—	—	—	—	—	—	—	—		Fatal Fury: City of the Wolves
"Story of a Bird" (with King)	2025	—	—	—	—	—	—	—	—	—	—		Non-album singles
"Me, Myself and the Night"	2025	—	—	—	—	—	—	—	—	—	—		Non-album singles
"World of Walker: Rise of the Drones"	2025	—	—	—	—	—	—	—	—	—	—		Non-album singles
"Heartbreak Melody" (with Faangs)	2025	94	—	—	—	—	—	—	—	—	—		Non-album singles
"Old Habits" (with Sofia Reyes and Farruko)	2025	—	—	—	—	—	—	—	—	—	—		Non-album singles
"Mi Fe" (with Frank Miami, Jay Kalyl and David Mugurencia)	2025	—	—	—	—	—	—	—	—	—	—		El Pescador
"Moonshine" (with Elley Duhé)	2025	—	—	—	—	—	—	—	—	—	—		Non-album single
"Sailing"	2025	—	—	—	—	—	—	—	—	—	—		World Of Walker, Season One: Rise of the Drones
"Welcome to the Lonely Club" (with Steve Aoki)	2025	—	—	—	—	—	—	—	—	—	—		Quantum Beats
"Broken Angel" (with Steve Aoki and Arash)	2025	—	—	—	—	—	—	—	—	—	—		Quantum Beats
"Springseeker"	2025	—	—	—	—	—	—	—	—	—	—		World Of Walker, Season One: Rise of the Drones
"Broken Strings" (with Isabella Melkman and Katherine O'Ryan)	2026	—	—	—	—	—	—	—	—	—	—		World Of Walker, Season One: Rise of the Drones
"Not Home" (with Alessia Labate)	2026	—	—	—	—	—	—	—	—	—	—		World Of Walker, Season One: Rise of the Drones
"Void" (with Sorana)	2026	—	—	—	—	—	—	—	—	—	—		World Of Walker, Season One: Rise of the Drones
"Adagio"	2026	—	—	—	—	—	—	—	—	—	—		World Of Walker, Season One: Rise of the Drones
"A World I Don't Know" (with Phoebe Ryan and Kaeleb)	2026	—	—	—	—	—	—	—	—	—	—		World Of Walker, Season One: Rise of the Drones
"Monster" (with Emyrson Flora)	2026	—	—	—	—	—	—	—	—	—	—		World Of Walker, Season One: Rise of the Drones
"The Sting Within Me" (with DreamDnvr)	2026	—	—	—	—	—	—	—	—	—	—		Non-album singles
"Fate" (with Ava Max)	2026	—	—	—	—	—	—	—	—	—	—		Non-album singles
"Pain" (with Jordan Shaw)	2026	—	—	—	—	—	—	—	—	—	—		Non-album singles
"Golden Bird" (with Liu Yu and Chuanzi)	2026	—	—	—	—	—	—	—	—	—	—		Non-album singles
"Indian summer" (with Kiddo)	2026	—	—	—	—	—	—	—	—	—	—		Non-album singles
"Yume" (with Raul (Snow Man))	2026	—	—	—	—	—	—	—	—	—	—		Non-album singles

=== As featured artist ===
List of singles as featured artist, with selected chart positions, showing year released and album name
Title	Year	Peak chart positions					Certifications	Album
Title	Year	NOR	FIN	POL	SWE	US Elec.	Certifications	Album
"Back to Beautiful" (Sofia Carson featuring Alan Walker)	2017	—	—	—	—	—		Non-album singles
"Ignite" (K-391 featuring Alan Walker, Julie Bergan and Seungri)	2018	1	5	5	13	28	IFPI NOR: 4× Platinum	Non-album singles
"PS5" (Salem Ilese and Tomorrow X Together featuring Alan Walker)	2022	—	—	—	—	—		Unsponsored Content
"—" denotes a recording that did not chart or was not released in that territory.

== Other songs ==
List of non-single And exclusive songs, with selected chart positions, showing year released and album name
Title	Year	Peak chart positions				Album
Title	Year	NOR	SWE Heat.	SWI	US Elec.	Album
"Celebrate" (as DJ Walkzz)	2012	—	—	—	—	Non-album single
"Sky" (with Alex Skrindo)	2017	—	—	—	—	EDC Las Vegas: 2017
"Lost Control" (with Sorana)	2018	3	1	21	28	Different World
"Lily" (with K-391 and Emelie Hollow)	2018	—	—	—	12	Different World
"Lonely" (with Steve Aoki featuring Isák and Omar Noir)	2018	31	—	—	—	Different World
"Sad Sometimes" (with Corsak featuring Huang Xiaoyun)	2019	—	—	—	—	Non-album single
"Somebody Like U" (with Au/Ra)	2022	—	6	—	46	Walkerverse, Pt. I & II
"In Your Eyes" (with Raffi Ahmad and Nagita Slavina)	2024	—	—	—	—	In Your Eyes EP
"Himmat BGMI Theme" (Remix) (India Exclusive)	2024	—	—	—	—	BGMI Album Soundtrack
"—" denotes a recording that did not chart or was not released.

== Remixes ==
=== Record label release ===
List of remixes, showing original artists, year released, with selected chart positions and album name
Title	Original artists	Year	Peak chart positions				Album
Title	Original artists	Year	NOR	FIN	FRA	SWE	Album
"Air" (Alan Walker Remix)	LarsM (featuring Mona Moua)	2014	—	—	—	—	Non-album singles
"Millionaire" (Alan Walker Remix)	Cash Cash and Digital Farm Animals (featuring Nelly)	2016	19	—	—	—	Non-album singles
"Move Your Body" (Alan Walker Remix)	Sia	2016	3	—	154	68	This Is Acting (Deluxe Edition)
"After the Afterparty" (Alan Walker Remix)	Charli XCX (featuring Lil Yachty)	2017	—	—	—	—	Non-album singles
"Back to Beautiful" (Alan Walker Remix)	Sofia Carson	2017	—	—	—	—	Non-album singles
"That's What I Like" (Alan Walker Remix)	Bruno Mars	2017	—	—	—	—	Non-album singles
"Issues" (Alan Walker Remix)	Julia Michaels	2017	—	—	—	—	Non-album singles
"Malibu" (Alan Walker Remix)	Miley Cyrus	2017	—	—	—	—	Non-album singles
"Tired" (Alan Walker Remix)	Alan Walker (featuring Gavin James)	2017	—	—	—	—	Non-album singles
"Legends Never Die" (Alan Walker Remix)	League of Legends (featuring Against the Current and Mako)	2017	—	—	—	—	Non-album singles
"Lonely Together" (Alan Walker Remix)	Avicii (featuring Rita Ora)	2017	—	—	—	—	Non-album singles
"Strongest" (Alan Walker Remix)	Ina Wroldsen	2017	—	—	—	—	Non-album singles
"Again" (Alan Walker Remix)	Noah Cyrus (featuring XXXTentacion)	2017	—	—	—	—	Non-album singles
"Stranger Things" (Alan Walker Remix)	Kygo (featuring OneRepublic)	2018	—	—	—	—	Kids in Love (Remixes)
"All Night" (Alan Walker Remix)	Steve Aoki and Lauren Jauregui	2018	—	—	—	—	Non-album singles
"This Is Me" (Alan Walker Relift)	Keala Settle and The Greatest Showman Ensemble	2018	—	—	—	—	Non-album singles
"Sheep" (Alan Walker Relift)	Lay	2018	—	—	—	—	Non-album singles
"Calma" (Alan Walker Remix)	Pedro Capó and Farruko	2019	—	—	—	—	Non-album singles
"Me vs. Us" (Alan Walker Remix)	Tayla Parx	2019	—	—	—	—	Non-album singles
"Choir" (Remix)	Guy Sebastian	2019	—	—	—	—	Non-album singles
"Play" (Niya & Alan Walker Remix)	K-391, Alan Walker, and Tungevaag (featuring Mangoo)	2019	—	—	—	—	Non-album singles
"Always" (Alan Walker Remix)	Gavin James	2020	—	—	—	—	Non-album singles
"In Your Arms" (Alan Walker Remix)	Illenium and X Ambassadors	2020	—	—	—	—	Non-album singles
"Time" (Alan Walker Remix)	Hans Zimmer	2020	—	—	—	—	World of Walker
"Hummell Gets The Rockets" (Alan Walker Remix)	Hans Zimmer	2020	—	—	—	—	World of Walker
"Selfish" (Alan Walker Remix)	Madison Beer	2020	—	—	—	—	Non-album single
"Time" (Alan Walker Festival Remix)	Hans Zimmer	2020	—	—	—	—	Alan Walker Tomorrowland Around The World 2020 (DJ Mix) (Apple Music)
"No Te Enamores" (Alan Walker Remix)	Milly, Farruko, Jay Wheeler and Nio Garcia	2021	—	—	—	—	Non-album singles
"Wherever You Go" (Alan Walker Remix)	Alok (featuring John Martin)	2022	—	—	—	—	Non-album singles
"All Around The World (La La La)" (Alan Walker Remix)	R3HAB and A Touch of Class	2022	—	—	—	—	Non-album singles
"Sickly Sweet" (Alan Walker Remix)	kenzie	2023	—	—	—	—	Non-album singles
"Cha Cha Cha" (Alan Walker Remix)	Käärijä	2023	—	12	—	—	Non-album singles
"Do It Like That" (Alan Walker Remix)	Jonas Brothers and Tomorrow X Together	2023	—	—	—	—	Non-album singles
"Hide Away" (Alan Walker Remix)	Daya	2024	—	—	—	—	Non-album singles
"Too Bad" (Alan Walker Remix)	G-Dragon (featuring Anderson .Paak)	2025	—	—	—	—	Non-album singles
"Viral" (Alan Walker Remix)	Boynextdoor	2026	—	—	—	—	Non-album singles
"—" denotes a recording that did not chart or was not released.							Non-album singles

=== Published remixes ===
List of remixes, showing original artist, year released and streaming platform
Title	Original artists	Year	Platform
Credited as DJ Walkzz
"Glimpse of Heaven" (DJ Walkzz Remix)	DJ Harmonics	2012	YouTube
"New Hunter" (DJ Walkzz Remix)	DJ Ness	2012	YouTube
"Dota" (DJ Walkzz Remix)	Basshunter	2012	YouTube
"Level One" (DJ Walkzz Remix)	Boosterz Inc	2012	YouTube
"Perry 2013" (DJ Walkzz Remake)	Baby T	2013	YouTube
"The Final Countdown" (DJ Walkzz Remix)	Europe	2013	YouTube
Credited as Alan Walker
"A World of Peace" (Alan Walker Remix)	Jacoo	2014	SoundCloud
"Rays of Light" (Alan Walker Remix)	Broiler	2015	YouTube; SoundCloud
"Shelter" (Alan Walker Remix)	Dash Berlin (featuring Roxanne Emery)	2015	SoundCloud
"Hymn for the Weekend" (Alan Walker Remix)	Coldplay	2016	YouTube; SoundCloud
"Money" (Alan Walker Remix)	Broiler	2016	SoundCloud

== Production credits ==
List of production singles, showing customer and year released
Title	Customer	Year
Credited as Walkzz
"The Young Geralds 2016"	Bergensrussen	2015
"24 Karat 2016"	Røykenrussen	2016
Credited as DJ Walkzz
"Kjuagutt 2016" (with DJ Ness)	Bergensrussen	2016
Credited as Alan Walker
"Golden Gate 2016" (Marvin Divine) with uncredited Alan Walker "Golden Gate" (Russ Collective featuring Alan Walker and Marvin Divine)	Larviksrussen	Published; 2015; Released; 2017
"Slow Lane" Armin van Buuren featuring James Newman as composer	—	Released; 2020

== Music videos ==
List of music videos, showing year released and directors
Title	Year	Director(s)
"Faded"	2015	Rikkard Häggbom; Tobias Häggbom
"Faded" (Restrung)	2016	Rikkard Häggbom; Tobias Häggbom
"Sing Me to Sleep"	2016	Rikkard Häggbom; Tobias Häggbom
"Alone"	2016	Rikkard Häggbom; Tobias Häggbom
"Ignite" (Instrumental)	2017	Alexander Gustavson
"Tired"	2017	Alexander Halvorsen
"The Spectre"	2017	Alexander Zarate Frez; Audun Notevarp
"All Falls Down"	2017	Kristian Berg
"Ignite"	2018	Alexander Zarate Frez
"Darkside"	2018	Kristian Berg
"Diamond Heart"	2018	Kristian Berg
"On My Way"	2019	Kristian Berg
"Are You Lonely"	2019	Jarand Herdal; Kristian Berg; Erik Ferguson
"On My Way" (Alternate M/V)	2019	Alexander Zarate Frez; Frederic Esnault; Jarand Herdal
"Play" (Alan Walker's Video) "Play" (K-391's Video) "Play" (Tungevaag's Video)	2019	Jarand Herdal
"Alone, Pt. II"	2019	Kristian Berg
"Alone, Pt. II" (Live at Château de Fontainebleau)	2020	Kristian Berg
"Heading Home"	2020	Kristian Berg
"Heading Home" (Live at Château de Fontainebleau)	2020	Kristian Berg
"Time" (Official Remix)	2020	Kristian Berg
"Space Melody"	2020	Kristian Berg; Andreas Trøften
"Sorry"	2021	Kristian Berg
"Fake a Smile"	2021	Kristian Berg
"Fake a Smile" (Official Lyric Video)	2021	Kristian Berg
"Sweet Dreams"	2021	Mads Neset
"Sweet Dreams" (Official Lyric Video)	2021	Mads Neset
"Don't You Hold Me Down"	2021	Kristian Berg
"Running Out of Roses" (Official Lyric Video)	2021	Aria Jadidi; Armand Nasiri
"Paradise"	2021	Kristian Berg
"Paradise" (Live Performance)	2021	Kristian Berg
"World We Used to Know" (Lyric Video)	2021	Kristian Berg
"Man on the Moon"	2021	Mads Neset
"Not You" (Live Performance)	2021	Kristian Berg
"Headlights" (Alok's Music Video)	2022	Diego Locatelli
"Hello World"	2022	Kristian Berg
"The Drum"	2022	Mads Neset
"Blue" (Official Lyric Video)	2022	Kristian Berg
"Somebody Like U"	2022	Kristian Berg
"Fade"	2022	HYPA
"Force"	2022	HYPA
"Spectre"	2022	HYPA
"Extremes"	2022	Kristian Berg
"Shut Up"	2022	Kristian Berg
"Hero"	2023	Mads Neset
"Endless Summer"	2023	Mads Neset
"Land of The Heroes" (Performance Video)	2023	Mohammed Sarmadawy
"Better Off (Alone, Pt. III)"	2023	Mads Neset
"Heart Over Mind"	2023	Mads Neset
"Fire!"	2023	Kristian Berg
"Who I Am"	2024	Mads Neset
"Who I Am" (Restrung Performance Video)	2024	Kristian Berg
"Team Side"	2024	Mads Neset
"Unsure"	2024	Anders Øvergaard; Erik Bergamini
"Barcelona"	2024	Kristian Berg
"Thick Of It All"	2024	Kristian Berg
"When I Grow Up" (Flo Rida's Music Video)	2024	None
"Dust"	2025	Kenny Garcia; Luke Flow; Silvia Storm
"Mind of a Warrior"	2025	None
"Story of a Bird"	2025	Mohammed Sarmadawy
"Me, Myself And The Night"	2025	Luke Flo; Silvia Storm
"Rise Of The Drones"	2025	None
"Old Habits"	2025	Hypha
"Mi Fe"	2025	Stian Andersen
"Moonshine"		None
"Sailing"		None
"Welcome to Lonely Club"		None
"Springseeker"		None
"Faded"		None
"Broken Strings"		None
"Old Habits"		None
"Eroina"		None
"Monster"		None
"Getaway"		None

Guest appearances
Title	Year	Artist
"Momentum"	2017	Don Diablo
