= World of Walker =

Studio album by Alan Walker
- Released: 25 November 2021
- Recorded: 2019–2021
- Labels: MER Musikk; Sony Music Entertainment
- Producers: Alan Walker (exec.); Gunnar Greve (exec.); kasper; James Njie; Sander Meland; Hightower; David Stewart; Erik Smaaland; Cirkut; STATE; K-391; Slipmats; Dreamlab; Mood Melodies; Julia Karlsson; Hans Zimmer

Alan Walker chronology
Walker Racing League (2021)	World of Walker (2021)	Walkerverse Pt. I (2022)

Singles from World of Walker
- 1. "On My Way" Released: 21 March 2019; 2. "Alone, Pt. II" Released: 27 December 2019; 3. "Heading Home" Released: 1 April 2020; 4. "Time (Alan Walker Remix)" Released: 15 May 2020; 5. "Sorry" Released: 12 February 2021; 6. "Fake a Smile" Released: 19 February 2021; 7. "Paradise" Released: 23 September 2021; 8. "World We Used to Know" Released: 12 November 2021; 9. "Man on the Moon" Released: 25 November 2021; 10. "Not You" Released: 17 August 2023

World of Walker is the second studio album by Norwegian DJ and record producer Alan Walker. It was released on 25 November 2021 through MER Musikk and Sony Music Entertainment and includes his successful 2019 single "On My Way".

== Background ==
The elaborate official artwork for World of Walker consists of thousands of selfies submitted by fans around the world as part of a collaborative production campaign.

Walker said of the album, "It's been three years since the release of my debut album Different World, and since then I've spent a lot of time working on new music and further developing Walker's cinematic universe. I am very excited to finally be able to release my new album, World of Walker. What is really special to me is that the official artwork consists of thousands of selfies of walkers from around the world. The time has finally come to unveil the community we have built together, the World of Walker."

== Singles ==
The album's first single, "On My Way", featuring Sabrina Carpenter and Farruko and was released on 21 March 2019. The single was released to celebrate the first anniversary of the American battle royale game PUBG Mobile and reached number 3 on the Norwegian VG-lista chart.

The second single, "Alone, Pt. II", featuring American singer Ava Max, was released on 27 December 2019. The song reached the top 10 in the charts in Belgium, Norway, Poland and Romania.

"Heading Home", featuring Norwegian singer Ruben, was released as the third single on 1 April 2020. The music video for this song is on the selection list for the 2021 Silver Screening of the Berlin Music Video Awards.

"Time (Alan Walker Remix)", a song with German film composer Hans Zimmer, was released as the fourth single from the album on 15 May 2020. The song is a remix of the song "Time" from Christopher Nolan's 2010 film Inception.

"Sorry", a song featuring Norwegian band Isák, was released as the fifth single on 12 February 2021. The song reached number 8 on the Norwegian VG-lista charts.

The single "Fake a Smile", featuring American singer-songwriter Salem Ilese, was released as the sixth single on 19 February 2021. Two remixes have been officially released, one by norwegian producer K-391 and one by Dutch procuer and DJ R3hab. The song charted in Norway, the Netherlands and Sweden.

The song "Paradise", featuring Norwegian producer K-391 and Swedish singer-songwriter Boy in Space, was released as the seventh single on 23 September 2021. The song was released in collaboration with the mobile game PUBG Mobile (PlayerUnknown's Battlegrounds). The song reached number 37 in the Norwegian charts.

The song "World We Used to Know", featuring Winona Oak, was released as the eighth single on 12 November 2021.

The song "Man on the Moon", featuring Swedish singer Benjamin Ingrosso, was released as the ninth single on 25 November 2021.

"Not You" featuring Emma Steinbakken was released as the tenth and final single from the album on 17 August 2023.

== Critical reception ==
Professional ratings
Review scores
Source	Rating
Gaffa (Norway)	2/6 stars
Gaffa (Denmark)	4/6 stars
Verdens Gang	2/6 stars

Matthew Lambert of We Rave You said, "It also includes short storytelling video snippets that take the listener on a journey through the songs and blend them with what Walker had envisioned. Through the music videos, Walker offers a glimpse into the enhanced album's reveals, telling an epic tale of a faraway, advanced civilisation, the ancient Walkers' discovery and its connection to modern-day humanity." Viljar Sæbbe of the Norwegian edition of Gaffa said: "World of Walker ages between the highlights. At the same time, it's easy to imagine shirt collars in record company offices giving big, juicy thumbs up." Norwegian newspaper Verdens Gang described the album as "a long string of banal, indifferent melodies and shallow lyrics" and "lacking any semblance of originality."

== Track listing ==
World of Walker track listing
No.	Title	Writer(s)	Producer(s)	Length
1.	"Time" (Alan Walker Remix) (with Hans Zimmer)	Alan Walker; Jamie Eriksen; Hans Zimmer	Walker; James Njie	2:26
2.	"Man on the Moon" (with Benjamin Ingrosso)	Walker; Gunnar Greve Pettersen; Jesper Borgen; Sander Meland; Marcus Arnbekk; Fredrik Borch Olsen; Øyvind Sauvik; Carl Hovind; Jessica Agombar; David Stewart; Jesper Jenset	Walker; kasper; Stewart; Njie^{[c]}; Meland^{[c]}	2:58
3.	"Alone, Pt. II" (with Ava Max)	Walker; Pettersen; Arnbekk; Olsen; Sauvik; Hovind; Amanda Koci; Moa Pettersson Hammar; Alexander Pavelich; Halvor Folstad; Dag Holtan-Hartwig; Erik Smaaland	Walker; Smaaland; kasper^{[c]}; Cirkut^{[c]}	2:59
4.	"Paradise" (with K-391 and Boy In Space)	Walker; Pettersen; Kenneth Nilsen; Arnbekk; Olsen; Sauvik; Hovind; Edvard Normann; Kristoffer Haugen; Pavelich; Sebastian Daniel; Ola Svensson	Walker; kasper; STATE; K-391	3:03
5.	"Out of Love" (with Au/Ra)	Walker; Pettersen; Arnbekk; Olsen; Sauvik; Mats Lie Skåre; Emilie Adams; Smaaland; Kristoffer Tommerbakke; Jamie Stenzel	Walker; kasper; Slipmats	2:24
6.	"Red Nexus Rising" (Interlude)	Walker; Eriksen	Walker; Njie	0:39
7.	"Sorry" (with ISÁK)	Walker; Pettersen; Eriksen; Arnbekk; Olsen; Sauvik; Hovind; Meland; Ella Isaksen	Walker; kasper; Meland; Njie	2:45
8.	"Fake a Smile" (with salem ilese)	Walker; Arnbekk; Olsen; Sauvik; Hovind; Johanna Ekmark; Peter Thomas Walsh; Leah Haywood; Daniel James; Salem Davern	Walker; Dreamlab; kasper^{[c]}; Meland^{[c]}	2:45
9.	"On My Way" (with Sabrina Carpenter and Farruko)	Walker; Pettersen; Borgen; Anders Frøen; Olsen; Sauvik; Julia Karlsson; Anton Rundberg; Sabrina Carpenter; Carlos Roasdo; Franklin Jovani Martínez; Marcos Perez	Walker; Big Fred; Mood Melodies^{[c]}; Hightower^{[v]}	3:13
10.	"World We Used to Know" (with Winona Oak)	Walker; Arnbekk; Olsen; Sauvik; Hovind; Lara Andersson; Karlsson; Rundberg; Ekmark	Walker; kasper; Hightower; Karlsson^{[v]}	2:41
11.	"Drone Wars" (Instrumental)	Walker; Eriksen	Walker; Njie	0:42
12.	"Heading Home" (with Ruben)	Walker; Pettersen; Borgen; Frøen; Arnbekk; Olsen; Sauvik; Hovind; Jenset; Magnus Bertelsen	Walker; kasper	3:07
13.	"OK" (with JOP)	Walker; Pettersen; Borgen; Skåre; Arnbekk; Olsen; Sauvik; Hovind; Andersson; Karlsson; Rundberg	Walker; kasper	2:45
14.	"Hummel Gets The Rockets" (Alan Walker Remix) (with Hans Zimmer)	Zimmer; Harry Gregson-Williams; Nicholas Glennie-Smith	Walker; Njie; Hans Zimmer	2:57
15.	"Not You" (with Emma Steinbakken)	Walker; Pettersen; Borgen; Arnbekk; Olsen; Sauvik; Hovind; Magnus Clausen; Thomas La Verdi	Walker; kasper	2:33
Total length:				37:57

Notes

- ^{^[c]} signifies a co-producer.
- ^{^[v]} signifies a vocal producer.
- The moniker of "kasper" is listed as a collective production alias for producers Marcus Arnbekk, Big Fred, Vinni and Carl Hovind.

== Charts ==
Chart performance for World of Walker
Chart (2021)	Peak position
Finnish Albums (Suomen virallinen lista)	24
Japanese Albums (Oricon)	47
Norwegian Albums (VG-lista)	4
Swedish Albums (Sverigetopplistan)	33
Swiss Albums (Schweizer Hitparade)	32
US Top Dance/Electronic Albums (Billboard)	10
US Heatseekers Albums (Billboard)	18

== Certifications ==
Certifications for World of Walker
Region	Certification	Certified units/sales
Singapore (RIAS)	Gold	5,000^{*}
^{*} Sales figures based on certification alone.
