= Heading Home (song) =

2020 single by Alan Walker and Ruben

Single by Alan Walker and Ruben

from the album World of Walker
- Released: April 1, 2020
- Genre: Dance
- Label: MER
- Songwriters: Carl Hovind; Anders Froen; Alan Walker; Jesper Borgen; Gunnar Greve; Magnus Bertelsen; Jesper Jenset; Fredrik Borch Olsen; Marcus Arnbekk; Øyvind Sauvik; Hans Martin Sandvik
- Producers: Carl Hovind; Alan Walker; Marcus Arnbekk; Big Fred

Alan Walker singles chronology
"End of Time" (2020)	"Heading Home" (2020)	"Time (Alan Walker Remix)" (2020)

Music video
- "Heading Home" on YouTube

"Heading Home" is a song by English-Norwegian DJ Alan Walker and Norwegian singer Ruben, released by MER Musikk on 1 April 2020.

== Background ==
Walker first performed the song at the X-Games Norway in 2016, and since then there has been nothing new about the song, but in 2020, he released "Heading Home."

About the song, Walker said, "Right after we released 'Faded' in 2015, we started a demo project called 'Heading Home'. We performed it live once, and since then we've been working on a few edits and never actually released it. That live performance alone quickly made it a popular song among walkers. They kept requesting me to release it, so I'm happy to finally do so. We also decided to release the original demo as a little treat for the walkers who have been asking for it for years!" he said.

== Critical reception ==
Harrison Watson of We Rave You writes, "The track opens with a beautiful guitar melody, immediately followed by Ruben's rustic vocals. Walker introduces a rhythmic percussion section that leads into the breakdown."

== Music video ==
The music video for the song was shot on location in Cambodia and directed by Christian Berg, one of the main driving forces behind World of Walker's global content. The story is told through the audiovisual world of music videos released since "Faded. The video for "Heading Home" is from "On My Way" and "Alone, Pt. II" and is the final episode in the trilogy.

The music video for this song is on the selection list for the 2021 Silver Screening of the Berlin Music Video Awards.

== Track listing ==
Digital download
No.	Title	Length
1.	"Heading Home" (with Ruben)	3:04
2.	"heading_home_demo2016.wav" (with Ruben)	3:13
Total length:		6:17

== Charts ==
Chart (2020)	Peak position
Norway (VG-lista)	15
Sweden (Sverigetopplistan)	53
US Hot Dance/Electronic Songs (Billboard)	21
