= Mad at Disney =

Single by Salem Ilese

from the EP Unsponsored Content
- Written: August 2019
- Released: July 24, 2020
- Genre: Pop
- Length: 2:17
- Label: Capitol; Caroline; HomeMade; TenThousand
- Songwriter(s): Jason Hahs; Bendik Møller
- Producer(s): Jason Hahs; Bendik Møller

Salem Ilese singles chronology
"It Gets Better" (2020)	"Mad at Disney" (2020)	"Coke and Mentos" (2020)

Music video
- "Mad at Disney" on YouTube

"Mad at Disney" is a song by American singer Salem Ilese from her second extended play Unsponsored Content (2022). It was released on July 24, 2020, for digital download and streaming by HomeMade and TenThousand Projects. The pop song was inspired by songwriter and producer Jason Hahs' disappointment after watching the 2019 remake of The Lion King. Ilese then recounted her disillusion with love after getting false expectations of romance from watching Disney Princess films. Lyrically, the track describes the love stories of Disney princesses from a negative perspective and further references several princesses.

"Mad at Disney" received positive reviews from music critics, who praised its lyrics. One month after its release, the song went viral on the online video platform TikTok. Consequently, the track entered the charts in various countries. It reached the top ten in Malaysia and Singapore and peaked within the top 50 in Australia, Flanders, Ireland and Norway. "Mad at Disney" was certified gold by the Recording Industry Association of America (RIAA), Music Canada (MC) and the Polish Society of the Phonographic Industry (ZPAV). On October 15, 2020, a music video directed by Phillip Lopez was released. It makes reference to various Disney films.

== Background and release ==
After running into American singer-songwriter Bonnie Hayes when she was 12 years old, Ilese was inspired to continue her studies at Berklee College of Music upon discovering that Hayes was a professor there. While attending Berklee, she met Bendik Møller in a writing session with whom she collaborated on her debut single "Awake" (2018) and her debut extended play 757 (2019). Ilese dropped out of the college after two years and moved to Los Angeles to pursue a career in music.

"Mad at Disney" was released for digital download and streaming by HomeMade and TenThousand Projects on July 24, 2020. It was sent for radio airplay in Italy and contemporary hit radio stations in the United States on October 6, 2020. The track was later included on Ilese's 2022 extended play Unsponsored Content.

== Composition ==
"Mad at Disney" was written in August 2019, during a writing session between Ilese, Møller and Jason Hahs. The title was inspired by Hahs's disappointment after viewing the 2019 remake of The Lion King, telling them "I'm really mad at Disney." Ilese then related that sentiment to the "false view of relationships" given to her by viewing animated Disney films. Hahs and Møller produced the song, while Zac Pennington mixed it and Stephen Kaye mastered it.

"Mad at Disney" is a pop song. Stereogum's Chris DeVille described the song's instrumentation as "thumping" and "synth powered". Lyrically, it details Ilese's disillusionment with love due to negative experiences with her own relationships, contrasting those with the fairy tale romances found in Disney films. The second verse includes retellings of the Disney films Cinderella and Sleeping Beauty, in which Cinderella and Prince Charming get a divorce and Aurora gets cheated on by her prince, respectively.

== Reception and commercial performance ==
"Mad at Disney" received positive reviews from music critics. DeVille called the song "a hell of a pop song", clarifying that "['Mad at Disney'] manages to sound like every other new pop song on the radio while also standing out from the pack". Elias Leight of Rolling Stone declared that "Mad at Disney" is "a skipping, four-on-the-floor pop missile". English singer Mollie King, writing for Marie Claire, stated that the track is "subtle yet hugely relevant" and referred to the lyrics as "thought-provoking". Idolator's Mike Wass called its lyrics "very relatable" and the chorus "catchy". Kristin Robinson of Billboard affirmed that the song is responsible for "the proliferation of hyper-conceptual, clever lyric writing" of TikTok songwriters who make use of "fan participation to inspire new music" alongside Blackbear's "Hot Girl Bummer" (2019). "Mad at Disney" went viral on the online video platform TikTok one month after its release. As of May 2021, the song was used in nearly 3 million videos on the platform.

As a result of its virality, the song entered the charts of several countries. "Mad at Disney" peaked at number seven in both Malaysia and Singapore. It also reached the top 50 in Australia, Flanders, Ireland, and Norway. The track peaked at number seven during its second week on Billboard's Bubbling Under Hot 100 and was certified gold by the Recording Industry Association of America (RIAA). In Canada, the song reached number 82 and was also certified gold by Music Canada (MC). Despite not entering the Polish charts, "Mad at Disney" was certified gold by the Polish Society of the Phonographic Industry (ZPAV).

== Promotion ==
The music video for "Mad at Disney" was published on Ilese's YouTube channel on October 15, 2020, and it was directed by Phillip Lopez. Throughout the video, Ilese makes references to various Disney films and also dresses up as several Disney characters. According to Alberto Murcia Palao of Los 40, Ilese wears a pair of ears that is similar to Dopey's. In the end scene, she is seen at a party among other characters, such as the Big Bad Wolf and Prince Charming. Wass called the music video "kooky". On October 22, 2020 Ilese gave an acoustic performance of the song at American radio station KIIS-FM. At the 2022 Outside Lands Music and Arts Festival, she sang an altered version of "Mad at Disney" to express her disapproval of the US Supreme Court's ruling on abortion in Dobbs v. Jackson Women's Health Organization.

== Personnel ==
Credits adapted from AllMusic.

- Salem Ilese – lead vocals
- Jason Hahs – songwriting, producer
- Bendik Møller – songwriting, producer
- Zac Pennington – mixing
- Stephen Kaye – mastering engineer

== Charts ==
Chart performance for "Mad at Disney"
Chart (2020)	Peak position
Australia (ARIA)	50
Belgium (Ultratop 50 Flanders)	48
Belgium (Ultratip Bubbling Under Wallonia)	4
Canada (Canadian Hot 100)	82
Global 200 (Billboard)	67
Greece International (IFPI)	75
Ireland (IRMA)	49
Malaysia (RIM)	7
Netherlands (Single Tip)	2
New Zealand Hot Singles (Recorded Music NZ)	17
Norway (VG-lista)	36
Portugal (AFP)	113
Singapore (RIAS)	7
Sweden Heatseeker (Sverigetopplistan)	19
UK Singles (OCC)	60
US Bubbling Under Hot 100 Singles (Billboard)	5
US Mainstream Top 40 (Billboard)	40
US Rolling Stone Top 100	100

== Certifications ==
Certifications for "Mad at Disney"
Region	Certification	Certified units/sales
Brazil (Pro-Música Brasil)	3× Platinum	120,000^{‡}
Canada (Music Canada)	Gold	40,000^{‡}
Poland (ZPAV)	Gold	25,000^{‡}
United States (RIAA)	Gold	500,000^{‡}
^{‡} Sales+streaming figures based on certification alone.

== Release history ==
Release dates and formats for "Mad at Disney"
Region	Date	Format	Label	Ref.
Various	July 24, 2020	Digital download; streaming	HomeMade; TenThousand	
Italy	October 6, 2020	Radio airplay	TenThousand; Caroline	
United States	October 6, 2020	Contemporary hit radio	TenThousand; Capitol	
