= Jesper Borgen =

Norwegian producer & songwriter

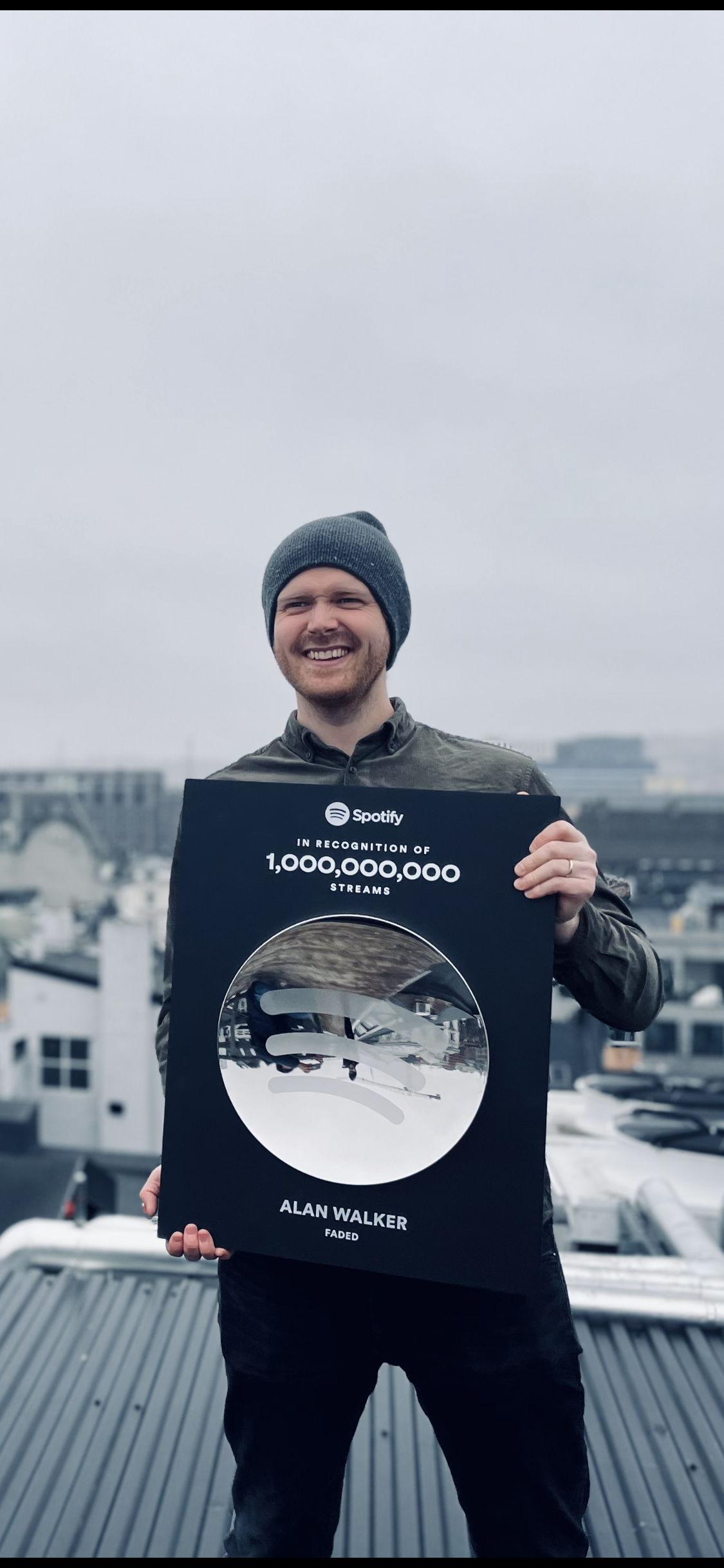

Background information
- Born: Jesper Borgen; 21 September 1988 (age 37)
- Origin: Oslo, Norway
- Occupation: Producer & Songwriter

Jesper Borgen (born 21 September 1988) is a Norwegian songwriter and producer. Songs written and produced by Jesper have been nominated for Brit Awards "British Single Of The Year", Echo Awards "Song Of The Year", P3 Gull "Song Of The Year", and Billboard Music Awards, as well as winning "Song Of The Year" at Spellemannsprisen, "Song Of The Year" at NRJ Music Awards Norge, "Western Single Of The Year" at KKBox Music Awards, "Best International Hit" at the Swiss Music Awards, and the TONO award for "Songwriter Of The Year" in Norway 2015.

He has been involved in both writing and producing extensively for Alan Walker, starting with the song "Faded", which became a worldwide hit with over five million single sales, reached number 1 in the official charts in 19 countries, and has over 2 billion Spotify streams. He was also a part of making the successful follow up singles for Walker, "Sing Me to Sleep" and Darkside. Jesper Borgen has written, collaborated with, and produced for artists like Kygo, Bebe Rexha, Steve Aoki, Farruko, Sabrina Carpenter, Felix Jaehn, Seeb, Girls' Generation, Christopher, Victon, and Tove Styrke. His work has also been remixed by artists like Marshmello and he himself has produced official remixes for the likes of Coldplay.

== Tracks ==
Year	Title	Artist	Credits
2026	Getaway	Alan Walker, Emyrson Flora	Co-writer
2026	Monster	Alan Walker, Emyrson Flora	Co-writer
2026	In Pieces Again	Sam Feldt, Conor Maynard	Co-writer
2026	Not Home	Alan Walker, Alessia Labate	Co-writer, co-producer
2026	Broken Strings	Alan Walker, Isabella Melkmann, Katherine O'Ryan	Co-writer
2025	Make It Right	Tom Gregory, VIZE	Co-writer
2025	Can't Get Enough	Victoria Nadine, Kygo	Co-writer, co-producer
2025	Mind Of A Warrior	Alan Walker	Co-writer
2025	Forever Young	Alan Walker	Co-writer, co-producer
2024	Avalon	Alan Walker	Co-writer
2024	Call My Name	Alle Farben, Sofiloud	Co-writer, co-producer
2024	Another Me	Victoria Nadine	Co-writer, Producer
2024	End Of The World	Alan Walker	Co-writer
2024	Too Good	Victoria Nadine	Co-writer
2023	Spectre 2.0	Alan Walker, Steve Aoki, Lonely Club	Co-writer & vocalist
2023	hope ur miserable	Victoria Nadine	Co-writer, co-producer
2022	Unendlich	Andrea Berg, Vanessa Mai	Co-writer
2022	Perfect Melody	Jonas Blue, Julian Perretta	Co-writer
2022	"Wouldn't Be Me"	Fedde Le Grand, Jamie, 22 Bullets	Co-writer
2021	"Man On The Moon"	Alan Walker, Benjamin Ingrosso	Co-writer
2021	"Not You"	Alan Walker, Emma Steinbakken	Co-writer
2021	"OK"	Alan Walker, JOP	Co-writer
2020	"I don't Know Why"	NOTD ft. Astrid S	Vocal producer
2020	"Mayday"	Victon	Co-producer & co-writer
2020	"Astronomia - Never Go Home"	Tony Igy	Co-writer
2020	"Paris"	Dagny	Co-writer
2020	"It's OK If You Forget Me"	Astrid S	Vocal producer
2019	"On My Way"	Alan Walker, Farruko, Sabrina Carpenter	Co-writer
2019	"Heading Home"	Alan Walker ft. Ruben	Co-writer
2019	"Are You Lonely"	Steve Aoki, Alan Walker, ISÁK	Co-writer
2019	"LIITA"	Felix Jaehn	Co-writer
2018	"Darkside"	Alan Walker ft. Au/Ra	Co-writer
2018	"Listen"	Seeb, Iselin	Co-writer
2018	"I Don't Wanna Go" (with Julie Bergan)	Alan Walker, Julie Bergan	Co-writer
2018	"Do It All for You"	Alan Walker, Trevor Guthrie	Co-writer
2017	"(Not) The One"	Bebe Rexha	Co-writer
2017	"Back To Beautiful"	Sofia Carson	Co-writer
2017	"The Spectre"	Alan Walker	Co-writer & Vocalist
2017	"Blackout"	Julie Bergan	Co-writer
2016	"Sing Me to Sleep (Marshmello Remix)"	Alan Walker, Marshmello	Co-producer & co-writer
2016	"Alone"	Alan Walker	Co-producer & co-writer
2016	"Sing Me to Sleep"	Alan Walker	Co-producer & co-writer
2016	"Hymn For The Weekend (remix)"	Alan Walker, Coldplay	Co-producer & co-writer
2015	"Faded"	Alan Walker	Co-producer, co-writer & Background Vocals
2015	"Over You"	Koichi Domoto (Japan)	Co-writer
2014	"Back hug"	Girls' Generation (Korea)	Producer & co-writer

== Awards and nominations ==
Year	Organization	Award	Work	Result
2017	Spellemannprisen '16	Årets produsent (Producer of the Year)	Jesper Borgen	Nominated
2017	Musikkforleggerprisen	Årets opphaver (Songwriter of the Year)	Jesper Borgen	Won
2017	Musikkforleggerprisen	Årets verk (Work of the Year)	Jesper Borgen	Won
