= K-391 =

Norwegian music producer and DJ (born 1994)

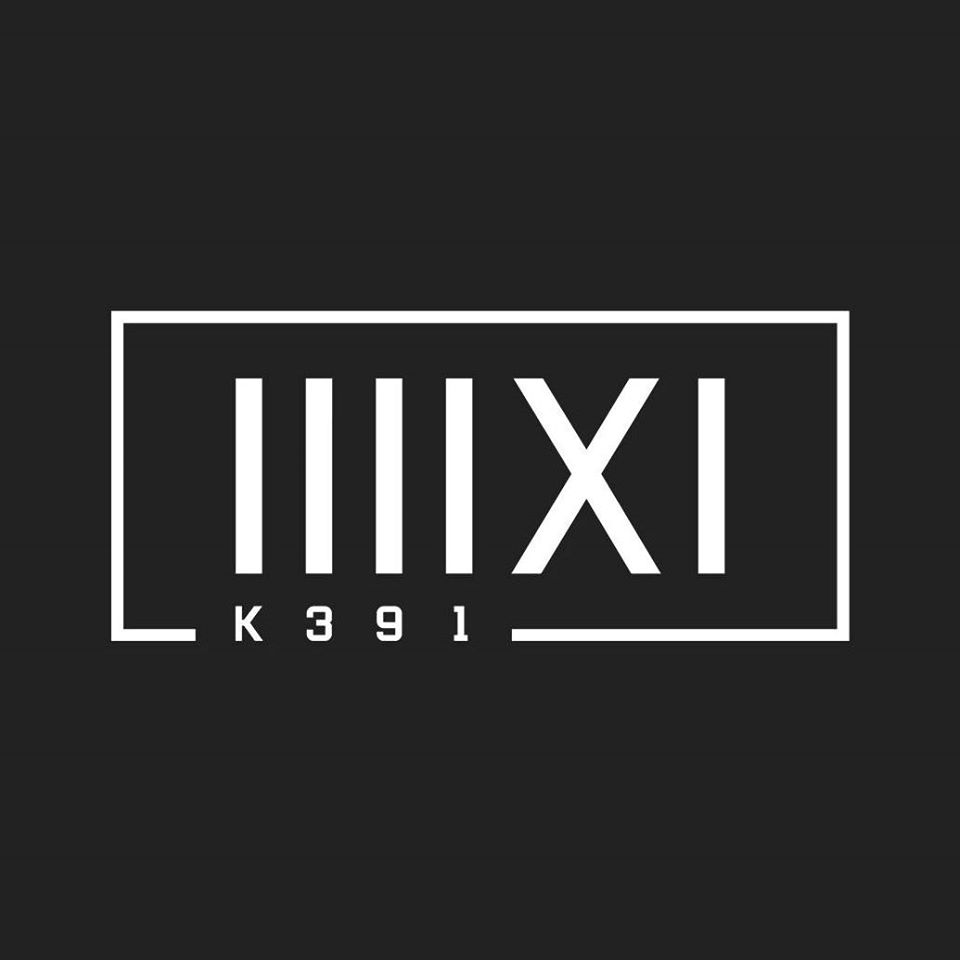
- K-391's logo

Background information
- Also known as: IIIIXI, Keosni391 (2009-2013), KON-391 (2009–2012)
- Born: Kenneth Osberg Nilsen; 2 November 1994 (age 32); Bamble, Norway
- Origin: Vinterbro, Ås, Norway
- Genres: EDM; electro house; future bass
- Occupations: Music producer; DJ
- Years active: 2009–present
- Labels: NCS; MER; Liquid State; Sony Music; EMI; Universal Music Group; IIIIXI AS; IIIIXI Recordings
- Website: www.k391.no

Kenneth Osberg Nilsen (born 2 November 1994), known professionally as K-391, is a Norwegian music producer and DJ. He is best known for his 2018 single "Ignite", a song featuring Alan Walker, Julie Bergan and Seungri which reached number one in Norway.

== Career ==
Kenneth Osberg Nilsen was born on 2 November 1994 in Bamble Municipality, Norway. He first became interested in music at the age of five. He heard a dance song on the radio and liked how it featured guitar and piano but was somehow different from other songs. He began listening to the radio every day, searching for songs in a similar genre. A few years later, he started taking piano lessons, but got bored after a year and quit. He listened mainly to techno and trance, but over the years he gradually developed a preference for electronic dance music. At the age of 14, he wanted to create his own techno and trance music, and while searching for a way to do so, he discovered the FL Studio.

He started out as Keosni391, but soon changed his name to K-391. When he entered high school, he developed a love for hip-hop and freestyle, and decided to pursue a professional career in composition. He continued working for a year without quitting, despite not receiving any feedback. In February 2012, he uploaded his track "Electro House 2012" to YouTube, which garnered over 500,000 views within a few weeks. This marked the beginning of his serious musical endeavors.

He continued to release dubstep and electro house tracks and demos at a rapid pace, with songs like "Summertime" and "Fantastic" becoming online hits. Some of these tracks were included on his digital albums Sunshine (2014), Overture (2017), and Hello, World (2018). In 2013, British record label, NoCopyrightSounds promoted his song "Dream Of Something Sweet", featuring Cory Friesenhan, on 22 December 2013. His final song on the label was "Earth", released on 30 April 2016.

In 2017, K-391 and Alan Walker released their collaborative single "Ignite", a reboot of his 2015 track "Godzilla" which featured vocalist Marvin Divine. Although the song was a collaboration, Nilsen was only credited as a feature on the song. The song, which was originally released as an instrumental, was released on 7 April 2017, through Walker's record label MER as well as Sony Music. A version of the song, featuring vocals by Norwegian singer-songwriter Julie Bergan and South Korean singer Seungri was later released on 11 May 2018. Although the instrumental was released through Mer Musikk and Sony Music, the vocal interpretation was released under Liquid State, a record label that focuses on electronic dance music. The vocal interpretation was praised as being significantly better than the instrumental and it was a huge success for K-391. K-391 went on to further collaborate with Alan Walker, remixing such songs as "Tired" and "All Falls Down".

On 30 November 2018, K-391 collaborated with Alan Walker and American singer Sofia Carson on the single "Different World", featuring Chinese producer CORSAK, through MER Musikk and Sony Music Entertainment. The track is a reboot of Nilsen's 2014 track called "Sevje". On 14 December 2018, the single appeared on Alan Walker's debut album of the same name, alongside "Lily" with Emelie Hollow which is the remake from Nilsen's song called "Flux" from "How To Make An Epic Rap Beat" on his YouTube Channel. K-391 later collaborated with Norwegian producers Martin Tungevaag, Mangoo and Alan Walker to create a remake of Mangoo's "Eurodancer", originally released in 2000. The collaboration was released on 30 August 2019 under the name "Play". In March 2020, Nilsen with Alan Walker and Ahrix created a single called "End of Time", the remake version of Ahrix's popular 2013 track "Nova" incorporating uncredited vocals provided by American-born Swedish songwriter Kristin Carpenter. In October 2020, K-391, along with RØRY made a new song called Aurora.

On 24 September 2021, K-391 collaborated with Alan Walker and Boy in Space to release the song "Paradise", taken from Walker's album World of Walker (2021). The song is also a collaboration with PUBG Mobile, and reached number 31 on the Norwegian VG-lista chart. On 12 November 2021, he collaborated with Linko on the song "Go Home", featuring Mentum, a reboot of their old track "Away".

In 2022, K-391 decided he would become independent and released "Nightmare" featuring Julianne Aurora. He went on to release tracks such as 'Lighthouse' with Julianne Aurora, 'Lonely World' with Victor Crone and 'Not Out of My Mind' with Xillions. In February 2023, he released 'Magic' with Brother Leo under UMG. In March 2024, K-391 collaborated with Vietnamese producer Hoaprox on the single "Die Alone".

== Discography ==
The discography of Norwegian music producer K-391 consists of 2 compilation albums, 15 singles, 6 remixes and 7 music videos.

=== Compilation albums ===
- Hello, World

- Released: 1 August 2018
- Label: IIIIXI AS
- Format: Digital Download

- Cyber Reality

- Released: 13 January 2022
- Label: K-391
- Format: Digital Download

=== Singles ===
==== As lead artist ====
List of singles as lead artist, with selected chart positions, showing year released and album name
Title	Year	Peak chart positions				Album
Title	Year	NOR	FIN	SWE	US Dance	Album
"Ignite" (featuring Alan Walker, Julie Bergan & Seungri)	2018	1	5	13	28	Non-album singles
"Mystery" (featuring Wyclef Jean)	2018	—	—	—	—	Non-album singles
"Play" (with Alan Walker & Tungevaag featuring Mangoo)	2019	2	11	25	32	Non-album singles
"End of Time" (with Alan Walker & Ahrix)	2020	4	—	60	24	Non-album singles
"Aurora" (featuring RØRY)	2020	—	—	—	—	Non-album singles
"Go Home" (with Linko featuring Mentum)	2021	—	—	—	—	Non-album singles
"Nightmare" (featuring Julianne Aurora)	2022	—	—	—	—	Non-album singles
"Lighthouse" (featuring Julianne Aurora)	2022	—	—	—	—	Non-album singles
"Lonely World" (featuring Victor Crone)	2022	—	—	—	—	Non-album singles
"Not Out Of My Mind" (with Xillions)	2022	—	—	—	—	Non-album singles
"Imagine"	2022	—	—	—	—	Non-album singles
"Magic" (featuring Brother Leo)	2023	—	—	—	—	Non-album singles
"GO" (featuring Pink Chilli)	2023	—	—	—	—	Non-album singles
"Alive" (featuring Maia Wright)	2024	—	—	—	—	Non-album singles
"M.I.A" (featuring M.I.A)	2024	—	—	—	—	Non-album singles
"—" denotes a recording that did not chart or was not released.

==== As featured artist ====
List of singles as lead artist, with selected chart positions, showing year released and album name
Title	Year	Peak chart positions			Album
Title	Year	NOR	FIN	US Dance	Album
"Ignite" (Alan Walker featuring K-391)	2017	—	—	—	Non-album single
"Lily" (Alan Walker featuring K-391 & Emelie Hollow)	2018	—	—	12	Different World
"Different World" (Alan Walker featuring K-391, Corsak & Sofia Carson)	2018	31	14	32	Different World
"Paradise" (Alan Walker featuring K-391 & Boy in Space)	2021	30	—	—	World of Walker
"—" denotes a recording that did not chart or was not released.

=== Remixes ===
List of remixes, showing original artists, year released, with selected chart positions and album name
Title	Original artists	Year	Peak chart positions			Album
Title	Original artists	Year	NOR	FRA	SWE	Album
"Tired" (K-391 Remix)	Alan Walker (featuring Gavin James)	2017	—	—	—	Non-album singles
"All Falls Down" (K-391 Remix)	Alan Walker (featuring Noah Cyrus & Digital Farm Animals)	2017	—	—	—	Different World
"Play" (Norda & K-391 Remix)	K-391 (with Alan Walker & Tungevaag featuring Mangoo)	2019	—	—	—	Non-album singles
"Skeleton" (K-391 Remix)	Keshi	2019	—	—	—	Non-album singles
"Fake A Smile" (K-391 Remix)	Alan Walker (featuring Salem Ilese)	2021	—	—	—	World of Walker
"Past Lives" (K-391 Remix)	Sapientdream & Slushii	2024	—	—	—	Non-album singles

=== Music videos ===
List of music videos, showing year released and directors
Title	Year	Director(s)
"Ignite"	2018	Alexander Zarate Frez
"Mystery"	2018	Kristian Berg
"Play"	2019	Jarand Herdal
"End of Time"	2020	Adam Falk
"Lonely World"	2022	Kevin Kulterud
"Magic"	2023	Alexander Zarate Frez
"GO"	2023	Alexander Zarate Frez
