= Babushka Boi =

2019 single by ASAP Rocky

Single by ASAP Rocky
- Released: August 28, 2019
- Length: 3:07
- Label: ASAP Forever; Polo Grounds; RCA
- Songwriter(s): Rakim Mayers; Alexander Ridha; Hector Delgado; Mario Reddick
- Producer(s): Boys Noize; Hector Delgado

ASAP Rocky singles chronology
"Live Fast" (2019)	"Babushka Boi" (2019)	"Twisted" (2019)

Music video
- "Babushka Boi" on YouTube

"Babushka Boi" is a song by American rapper ASAP Rocky, released as a single through ASAP Rocky Recordings, Polo Grounds Music and RCA Records on August 28, 2019. The music video was released the same day.

== Background ==
ASAP Rocky began wearing a babushka headscarf to cover the resulting cut on his face after he fell off his scooter in September 2018. This inspired Frank Ocean, who posted a picture on his Instagram of himself in a babushka, with ASAP Rocky commenting "Babushka Boi" on the image and later adding the phrase to his own Instagram. Rocky previewed the song at the 'Injured Generation Tour' in January 2019, and shared a trailer of its music video on August 26.

== Music video ==
The Nadia Lee Cohen-directed music video was also released on August 28. It was inspired by Dick Tracy and features ASAP Rocky, ASAP Ferg, Schoolboy Q, ASAP Nast and Kamil Abbas as prosthetic-enhanced gangsters robbing a bank and on the run from police, who are portrayed as anthropomorphic pigs. The criminals get into a shootout with the police which "leaves ASAP and his crew with some fresh sausage meat."

It has been noted that it was filmed before ASAP Rocky's arrest and detainment in Sweden. The video was produced by Virgin Soil Pictures.

== Charts ==
=== Weekly charts ===
Chart (2019)	Peak position
Australia (ARIA)	60
Canada (Canadian Hot 100)	48
Latvia (LAIPA)	12
Lithuania (AGATA)	21
New Zealand (Recorded Music NZ)	39
Sweden Heatseeker (Sverigetopplistan)	5
Switzerland (Schweizer Hitparade)	66
UK Singles (OCC)	89
US Billboard Hot 100	69
US Hot R&B/Hip-Hop Songs (Billboard)	27
US Rolling Stone Top 100	32

== Certifications ==
Certifications for "Babushka Boi"
Region	Certification	Certified units/sales
Canada (Music Canada)	Gold	40,000^{‡}
New Zealand (RMNZ)	Gold	15,000^{‡}
Poland (ZPAV)	Gold	25,000^{‡}
United States (RIAA)	Gold	500,000^{‡}
^{‡} Sales+streaming figures based on certification alone.
