= Sweet Dreams (Alan Walker and Imanbek song) =

Single by Alan Walker and Imanbek

from the EP Walker Racing League
- Released: 11 June 2021
- Genre: Dance-pop; deep house
- Length: 2:18
- Label: MER; Sony
- Songwriter: Alan Walker
- Producers: Alan Walker; Imanbek

Alan Walker singles chronology
"Believers" (2021)	"Sweet Dreams" (2021)	"Don't You Hold Me Down" (2021)

Imanbek singles chronology
"Baddest" (2021)	"Sweet Dreams" (2021)	"Feel Good" (2021)

"Sweet Dreams" is a song by British-Norwegian DJ Alan Walker and Kazakh DJ Imanbek, released as a single on 11 June 2021. The song samples the Scatman John track "Scatman (Ski-Ba-Bop-Ba-Dop-Bop)" and was a hit in both Norway and Sweden. A remix contest of "Sweet Dreams" was launched in partnership of Alan Walker and the digital workstation, FL Studio.

== Music video ==
The music video was released on Alan Walker's channel on 11 June 2021. It shows two car racers racing in a desert landscape. The music video currently has over 26.9 million views.

== Remixes ==
The two producers also released a remix package titled Sweet Dreams Remixes that contained the following tracks:

1. "Sweet Dreams" (with Alok)
2. "Sweet Dreams" (Brooks Remix)
3. "Sweet Dreams" (Curbi Remix)
4. "Sweet Dreams" (Mari Ferrari & Rompasso Remix)
5. "Sweet Dreams" (Albert Vishi)
6. "Sweet Dreams" (DES3ETT Remix)

== Charts ==
=== Weekly charts ===
2021 Weekly chart performance
Chart (2021)	Peak position
CIS Airplay (TopHit)	38
Italy (FIMI)	96
Norway (VG-lista)	14
Russia Airplay (TopHit)	47
Slovakia Airplay (ČNS IFPI)	7
Sweden (Sverigetopplistan)	43
Ukraine Airplay (TopHit)	8
US Hot Dance/Electronic Songs (Billboard)	18

2022 Weekly chart performance
Chart (2022)	Peak position
CIS Airplay (TopHit)	112
Ukraine Airplay (TopHit)	8

2023 Weekly chart performance
Chart (2023)	Peak position
Lithuania Airplay (TopHit)	175
Moldova Airplay (TopHit)	64
Ukraine Airplay (TopHit)	43

2024 Weekly chart performance
Chart (2024)	Peak position
Lithuania Airplay (TopHit)	136

2025 Weekly chart performance
Chart (2025)	Peak position
Lithuania Airplay (TopHit)	194

2026 Weekly chart performance
Chart (2026)	Peak position
Kazakhstan Airplay (TopHit)	90

=== Monthly charts ===
2021 monthly chart performance
Chart (2021)	Peak position
CIS Airplay (TopHit)	43
Russia Airplay (TopHit)	52
Ukraine Airplay (TopHit)	13

2022 monthly chart performance
Chart (2022)	Peak position
Ukraine Airplay (TopHit)	10

2023 monthly chart performance
Chart (2023)	Peak position
Moldova Airplay (TopHit)	86
Ukraine Airplay (TopHit)	57

=== Year-end charts ===
2021 year-end chart performance
Chart (2021)	Position
CIS Airplay (TopHit)	130
Ukraine Airplay (TopHit)	55
US Hot Dance/Electronic Songs (Billboard)	52

2022 year-end chart performance
Chart (2022)	Position
Ukraine Airplay (TopHit)	37

2023 year-end chart performance
Chart (2023)	Position
Ukraine Airplay (TopHit)	189

=== Decade-end charts ===
20s Decade-end chart performance
Chart (2021–2026)	Position
Ukraine Airplay (TopHit)	123

== Certifications ==
Certifications for "Sweet Dreams"
Region	Certification	Certified units/sales
Italy (FIMI)	Gold	35,000^{‡}
Spain (Promusicae)	Gold	30,000^{‡}
^{‡} Sales+streaming figures based on certification alone.
