= Paradise (Alan Walker, K-391 and Boy in Space song) =

Single by Alan Walker, K-391 and Boy in Space

from the album World of Walker
- Language: English
- Released: 23 September 2021
- Genre: Electropop; future bass; pop reggae
- Label: MER; Sony Music
- Producer: Alan Walker

Alan Walker singles chronology
"Running Out of Roses" (2021)	"Paradise" (2021)	"World We Used to Know" (2021)

K-391 singles chronology
"Aurora" (2020)	"Paradise" (2021)	"Nightmare" (2022)

Boy in Space singles chronology
"Remember Me" (2021)	"Paradise" (2021)

Music video
- "Paradise" on YouTube

Music video
- "Paradise (Live Performance) on YouTube

"Paradise" is a song by Norwegian DJs Alan Walker and K-391, and Swedish singer-songwriter Boy in Space. Previously a non-album release through MER and Sony Music in 2021 as a collaboration with mobile game PUBG Mobile (PlayerUnknown's Battlegrounds), it was included as the seventh single of the former's second studio album, World of Walker (2021). "Paradise" is used in the game's lobby and vehicle and also features in a release of unique game items of PUBG, a battle royale game on Android and iOS.

The song comes exactly two years after PUBG Mobile used the track "Live Fast" by Alan Walker and American rapper A$AP Rocky as an official anthem of a commercial release of theirs.

== Music video ==
The track is accompanied by an official video and features as the next chapter in the "World of Walker", the story that has been ongoing in previous Alan Walker videos, particularly the music video "Faded". Despite the music video heavily resembling that of "Faded"'s, it was confirmed that it does not serve as its sequel, but rather serves as an expansion behind the 2015 music video's story, meaning that both videos occur at the same time.

A separate official live version was released as a music video under the title "Paradise (Live Performance)".

== Charts ==
Chart performance for "Paradise"
Chart (2021)	Peak position
Norway (VG-lista)	37
Sweden Heatseeker (Sverigetopplistan)	6
US Hot Dance/Electronic Songs (Billboard)	32
