= End of Time (K-391, Alan Walker and Ahrix song) =

2020 song by K-391, Alan Walker and Ahrix

Single by K-391, Alan Walker and Ahrix
- Released: 6 March 2020
- Genre: Pop
- Label: MER Musikk
- Songwriters: Marcus Arnbekk; Sander Meland; K-391; James Njie; Big Fred; Arjen Eggebeen; Alan Walker; Kristin Carpenter; Julia Karlsson

K-391 singles chronology
"Play" (2019)	"End of Time" (2020)	"Aurora" (2020)

Alan Walker singles chronology
"Alone, Pt. II" (2019)	"End of Time" (2020)	"Heading Home" (2020)

Music video
- "End of Time" on YouTube

"End of Time" is a song by Norwegian DJs and producers K-391 and Alan Walker, and Dutch DJ and music producer Ahrix, released as a single on 6 March 2020 through MER Musikk. It contains uncredited vocals provided by Kristin Carpenter.

== Background ==
The song is a renewed version of Ahrix's song "Nova", which was released on NoCopyrightSounds in 2013. "Nova" was the focus of Alan Walker and K-391 at the time. The three collaborated on "End of Time" to bring give a modern update to the song. Walker was heavily influenced by Ahrix and K-391, so "End of Time" became a meaningful project for the group.

The song is also a tribute to the producers of the past, as well as the three members' strong desire to create a song that gives courage to future bedroom producers. Walker, Ahrix, and K-391 all became famous at the NCS, and the ring of light on the cover art of "End of Time" is a reference to the ring in the NCS video.

Walker plans to invite producers from around the world to further develop the song and eventually release an official remix. Walker said, "I want to pay tribute to everyone who is trying to make their way in the bedroom, just like we did in the beginning. It's so cool to be starting this project."

== Live performances ==
Four years after performing the mega-hit "Faded" at the first X Games Norway in Oslo in 2016, Alan Walker, K-391 and Ahrix returned to X Games Norway to perform the song at the Big Air Final on 7 March 2020, at the X Games Norway, marking Walker's first opportunity to perform the song live after its release the day before on 6 March.

== Track listings ==
Digital download
No.	Title	Length
1.	"End of Time"	3:07

Digital download – Remixes
No.	Title	Length
1.	"End of Time" (Tribute Remix)	2:54
2.	"End of Time" (VIZE Remix)	2:57
3.	"End of Time" (MOTi Remix)	2:58
4.	"End of Time"	3:07

== Charts ==
Chart (2022)	Peak position
Norway (VG-lista)	4
Sweden (Sverigetopplistan)	60
Switzerland (Schweizer Hitparade)	80
US Hot Dance/Electronic Songs (Billboard)	24

== Certifications ==
Region	Certification	Certified units/sales
Norway (IFPI Norway)	Platinum	30,000^{‡}
^{‡} Sales+streaming figures based on certification alone.
