= Boy in Space =

Swedish singer-songwriter and musician

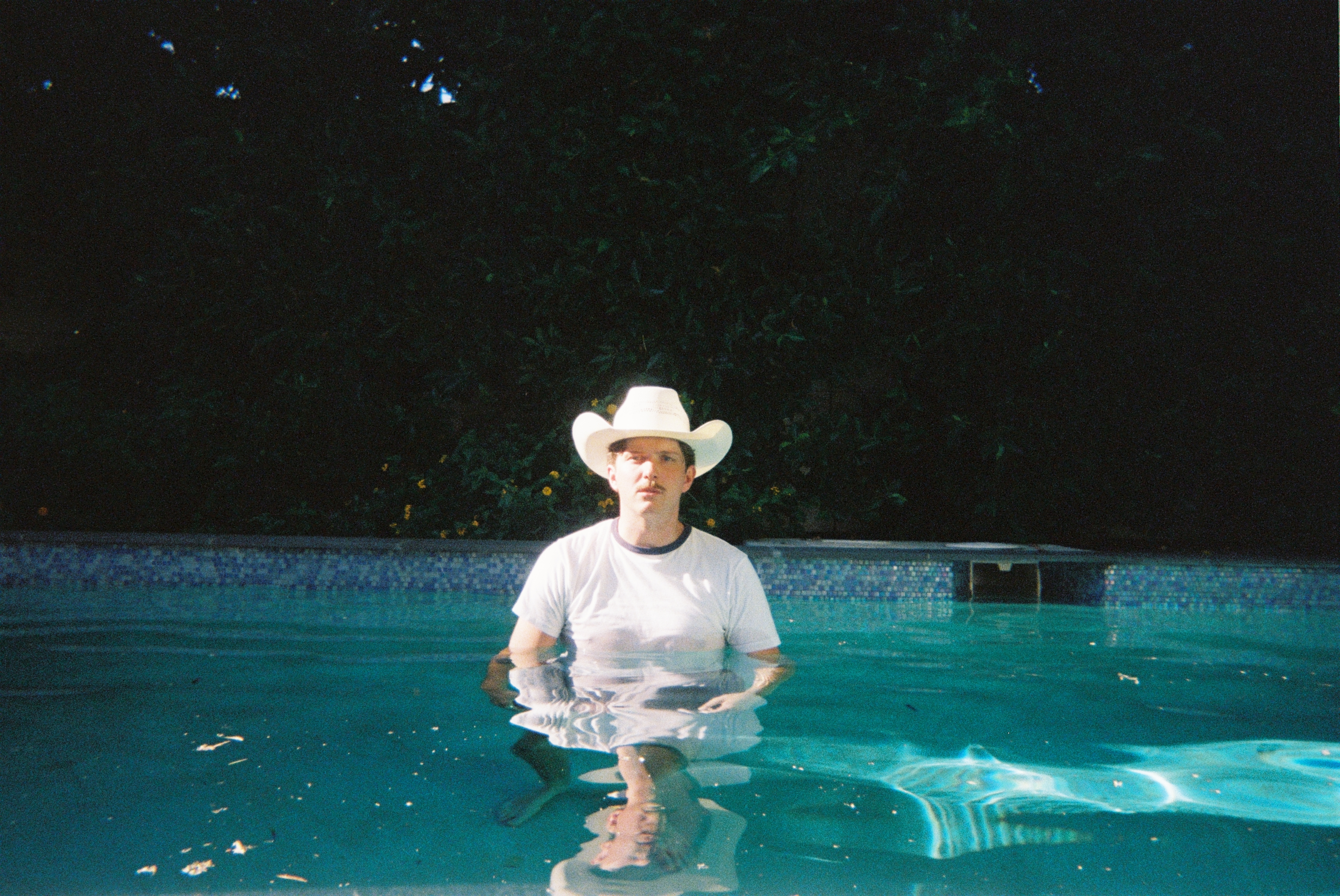
- Press photo

Background information
- Born: Robin Lundbäck; 17 May 1994 (age 32)
- Origin: Alingsås, Sweden
- Genres: Pop; R&B
- Occupations: Singer; songwriter; musician
- Instrument: Vocals
- Years active: 2012–present
- Website: boyinspace.com

Robin Lundbäck (born 17 May 1994), known professionally as Boy in Space, is a Swedish singer-songwriter and musician from Alingsås, Sweden. His moniker refers to his personality, which he has described as "spacey". Before starting his solo career, Lundbäck was one of the members in the Swedish boy band JTR. The band participated in the fifth season of The X Factor Australia and has released two studio albums.

== Career and background ==
Lundbäck was born and raised in Alingsås in Sweden which is also the place where he currently resides and creates music. His moniker has been described as the following: "To be 'In Space' is to exist in the in-between. It's not quite the beginning but it's so far from the end. It's standing apart from those who've found their conventional fit in this world, and recognizing that to be different is to be special. It's the courage to depart the familiar to a destination unknown. The 'space' is the intensity of youth. The cold sting of heartbreak. The suffocation of betrayal. And the fiery passion of young love". In an interview with Wonderland magazine, Lundbäck said that he was set to perform with American singer and songwriter Alec Benjamin, which he did in 2019. He was supposed to perform solo in London in 2020, but was cancelled or delayed to 2021 or 2022 due to the COVID-19 pandemic. Furthermore, Lundbäck announced a European Tour Support together with Jeremy Zucker and he also was supposed to perform at "Dot to Dot Festival in Manchester, Bristol and Nottingham from 22nd to 24th May 2020. However, the performances were either delayed or cancelled due to the COVID-19 pandemic.

In 2018, Lundbäck released his first single as a solo artist, called "Goodbye". He released two more singles that year, "Give Me" and "California". In 2019, he released the singles "7UP", "Drown" and "Cold", with the latter having received close to 90 million streams on Spotify. Lundbäck subsequently released a remix for the song "7UP", which he created with Tiger Tom (Tom Lundbäck), his brother, who also was a member of the band JTR.

A music video was released for Boy In Space's song "Caroline", which by Billboard magazine was described as "Alice in Wonderland-Inspired". The song "u n eye" has been described as a "R&B-infused pop track". Lundbäck has also spoken regarding the songwriting of "Drown", saying that "I [Lundbäck] was actually watching Friends on Netflix and I watched the episode where Ross and Rachel break up. I don't know why, but it made me so irrationally sad. It reminded me of when my parents got divorced when I was younger, and I felt like I had to put that energy somewhere… so I went into the studio and wrote 'Drown' later that day." In 2019, Lundbäck performed the song at Musikhjälpen. He also sang his single "On A Prayer", which in the original song features vocals and songwriting from Shy Martin. Lundbäck released a live version of "u n eye" on 27 March 2020. On 1 May 2020, Lundbäck released a cover of Alphaville's song "Forever Young" as a single. Regarding the release of the cover, Lundbäck stated that "The song has a message that is timeless for all generations and I'm proud to join the ever-growing list of talented artists who have covered it." In 2021, he released a song titled "Paradise" with the Norwegian DJ Alan Walker and music producer K-391.

== Discography ==
=== Studio albums ===
- The Man Who Lost it All (2026)

=== Extended plays ===
- Live (2020)
- Frontyard (2021)
- Backyard (2022)
- Copium (2024)
- The Butterfly Affect (2025)

=== Singles ===
==== As lead artist ====
Title	Year	Peak chart positions		Album
Title	Year	SWE	NOR	Album
"Goodbye"	2018	—	—	Non-album singles
"Give Me"	2018	—	—	Non-album singles
"California"	2018	—	—	Non-album singles
"7UP"	2019	—	—	Non-album singles
"Cold" (with unheard)	2019	—	—	Non-album singles
"Drown"	2019	—	—	Non-album singles
"On a Prayer" (featuring Shy Martin)	2019	—	—	Non-album singles
"Caroline"	2020	—	—	Non-album singles
"u n eye"	2020	—	—	Non-album singles
"Forever Young"	2020	—	—	Non-album singles
"Therapy" (with NOTD)	2020	—	—	Non-album singles
"Dance Alone"	2021	—	—	Frontyard
"Remember Me"	2021	—	—	Frontyard
"Paradise" (with Alan Walker and K-391)	2021	—	31	World of Walker
"Let You Go"	2021	—	—	Non-album singles
"Picking Flowers - Acoustic"	2022	—	—	Frontyard Acoustic Session
"Remember Me - Acoustic"	2022	—	—	Frontyard Acoustic Session
"Dead End - Acoustic"	2022	—	—	Frontyard Acoustic Session
"A**hole"	2022	—	—	BACKYARD
"Lean On"	2022	—	—	BACKYARD
"Ciao"	2023	—	—	Non-album singles
"A Hundred Million Lights"	2023	—	—	Non-album singles
"Atom Bomb"	2024	—	—	Copium
"Finally Fine Without You"	2024	—	—	Copium
"The Last Time"	2024	—	—	Copium
"Dancing On Dynamite"	2024	—	—	
"Too Much To Lose"	2024	—	—	
"Take It Easy"	2025	—	—	
"—" denotes a recording that did not chart or was not released.

==== As a featured artist ====
Title	Year	Peak chart position	Album
Title	Year	SWE	Album
"Still the Same" (Shy Martin featuring Boy in Space)	2020	—	Non-album singles
"Amnesia" (Dreamdnvr featuring Boy In Space)	2020	—	Non-album singles
"Psycho" (Dreamdnvr featuring Boy In Space)	2020	—	Non-album singles
"Liked you better" (good problem featuring Boy In Space)	2022	—	Everything's Shifting
"Spider" (Said the Sky featuring Boy In Space)	2022	—	Sentiment
"Nail In The Coffin" (Rosie Darling featuring Boy In Space)	2023	—	Lanterns
"Inside Out" (Winona Oak featuring Boy In Space)	2024	—	Void
"—" denotes a recording that did not chart or was not released.

==== Remixes ====
Title	Year
"7UP (Tiger Tom Remix)"	2019
"Cold (Vinai Remix)"	2019
"Cold (Andrei Remix)"	2019
"Cold (Andrelli Remix)"	2019
"Caroline (Pretty Young Remix)"	2020

=== With JTR ===
==== Albums ====
Title	Album details	Peak chart positions	
Title	Album details	SWE	AUS
Touchdown	Released: 7 March 2014 (Australia); Label: Trinity Recordings; Formats: CD, digital download	25	44
Oh My My	Released: 26 August 2015 (Japan); Label: Sony Music; Formats: CD, digital download	—	—
"—" denotes a recording that did not chart or was not released.

==== Singles ====
Title	Year	Peak chart positions		Album
Title	Year	SWE	AUS	Album
"Ride"	2014	—	—	Touchdown
"Night for Life"	2014	—	—	Non-album singles
"Centre of Everywhere"	2015	—	—	Non-album singles
"You'll Be Alright"	2016	—	—	Non-album singles
"If I Didn't Know Better"	2017	—	—	Non-album singles
"—" denotes a single that did not chart in that country.

== Tours ==
=== Supporting ===
- Alec Benjamin: Caught in the Middle World Tour (2019)
- Jeremy Zucker: love is not dying European Tour (2020; cancelled due COVID-19 pandemic)
