= Walker Racing League =

EP by Alan Walker
- Released: 10 September 2021
- Genre: Pop
- Label: MER

Alan Walker chronology
Live Fast (Japan Exclusive) (2019)	Walker Racing League (2021)	World of Walker (2021)

Singles from Walker Racing League
- 1. "Space Melody (Edward Artemyev)" Released: 11 December 2020; 2. "Sweet Dreams" Released: 11 June 2021; 3. "Don't You Hold Me Down" Released: 27 August 2021

Walker Racing League is a six-track extended play by Norwegian record producer and DJ Alan Walker. It was released on 10 September 2021 through MER.

== Overview ==
Walker Racing League" features a total of six tracks, including "Sweet Dreams", which samples "Scatman", and the single "Don't You Hold Me Down". The music videos for these songs feature visuals of a car race, and the songs are mainly up-tempo club tracks with a fast-paced feel.

== Track listing ==
Walker Racing League track listing
No.	Title	Length
1.	"Jump Start"	1:29
2.	"Running Out of Roses"	2:16
3.	"Don't You Hold Me Down"	2:12
4.	"Sweet Dreams"	2:18
5.	"Space Melody (Edward Artemyev)"	3:00
6.	"Finish Lines"	1:28
Total length:		12:43

== Charts ==
Chart performance for Walker Racing League
Chart (2021)	Peak position
Finnish Albums (Suomen virallinen lista)	19
Swedish Albums (Sverigetopplistan)	32
