= Time (Hans Zimmer and Alan Walker song) =

2020 single by Hans Zimmer and Alan Walker

Single by Hans Zimmer and Alan Walker

from the album World of Walker
- Released: 15 May 2020
- Genre: Electro house; progressive house
- Length: 2:30
- Label: Sony
- Songwriters: Alan Walker; Hans Zimmer; James Njie
- Producers: Alan Walker; James Njie

Alan Walker singles chronology
"Heading Home" (2020)	"Time" (2020)	"Space Melody (Edward Artemyev)" (2020)

Music video
- "Time" (Alan Walker remix) on YouTube

"Time" is a song by German music producer Hans Zimmer and Norwegian DJ Alan Walker, released by Sony Music on 15 May 2020. It was included on Walker's 2nd studio album World of Walker, which was released on 25 November 2021. Following its release, the song received positive reviews from music critics.

== Background ==
The song is a remix of "Time" from Christopher Nolan's 2010 film Inception. The two first met in April 2019 in Barcelona on one of the dates of the "World of Hans Zimmer – A Symphonic Celebration" tour. This meeting led to talks about a possible collaboration, which finally saw the light of day.

Walker said of the song: "Growing up, I never imagined that I would become an artist and turn my passion into a career. And a lot of the things I've been fortunate enough to experience over the past years, are truly surreal. But collaborating with Hans Zimmer on this, is an out-of-body experience on a whole different level. Everyone who knows me, knows that I'm a huge fan of Hans Zimmer. His work has played a big part of my musical journey. Especially 'Time', which is probably my favorite song ever. The fact that my version of it is the first-ever official remix release of any Hans Zimmer work, is mind-blowing. I'm as grateful as I can possibly be for this opportunity!".

Zimmer says of the collaboration: "I am truly grateful to be able to collaborate with such talented young musicians who say they have been influenced by my work. I am very happy to be collaborating with Alan Walker on his new remix of 'Time'. This means a lot to me, and I couldn't be more excited to finally be able to share it with you. Now, more than ever, I feel we must continue to inspire the minds of the young people of the future. May this song do just that!".

== Critical reception ==
Kat Bein of Billboard wrote: "which turns the gracefully building composition into an uplifting, trance-inspired anthem — all while maintaining the moody beauty of the original". Ellie Mullins of We Rave You wrote: "Retaining the emotions that are sewn into the very core of the original, he’s not turned it into a crazy hyped up dance track, but rather used the incredible orchestral arrangements to strengthen his skills. Injecting just the right amount of energy into it, it’s clear that he put a lot of thought into it and wanted to do Zimmer proud". Matthew Meadow of Your EDM wrote: "The original by Zimmer is a beautiful composition, fraught with emotion, tension, and hope. Miraculously, Walker is able to retain many of those emotions even in the scope of a remix. The main melody is kept intact, albeit with a more dance music twist, a bit more upbeat rhythm and some drums. The drop, when it finally comes, also deftly incorporates the melody while still keeping true to Walker’s own style". Niko Sani of EDM.com wrote: "While keeping many elements of the original, he's added some new digital elements. He's increased the tempo a bit, added a bassline, and transformed 'Time' into a house track that still retains its cinematic moments."

== Music video ==
The music video for the song was shot in Oslo, London, Budapest and New York. The concept for this video was adapted to account for the closed locations and the need for a very small film crew. Director Kristian Berg says of the music video: "The audience is already stuck indoors, only venturing on to their balconies or peering from their living room windows, so I imagined this would be a nice visual postcard from a special time in history." Walker says of the music video: “Since the song was created during the coronavirus pandemic, I wanted to give hope to the listeners. I also wanted to add a hopeful story to the video. Scenes take place around the world, from Oslo to London to Budapest to New York. Images of me and Hans will be projected onto the buildings and bridges of the deserted city. It feels like a video postcard, reminding us that we can all overcome this unprecedented crisis. I'm sending a message."

== Track listing ==
Digital download
No.	Title	Length
1.	"Time" (Alan Walker remix)	2:30
2.	"Time" (Alan Walker remix – extended version)	3:35
Total length:		6:05

== Charts ==
Chart (2020)	Peak position
Germany Dance (Official German Charts)	20
Hungary (Single Top 40)	33
Switzerland (Schweizer Hitparade)	24
UK Singles Downloads (OCC)	100
US Hot Dance/Electronic Songs (Billboard)	35

== Certifications ==
Region	Certification	Certified units/sales
Germany (BVMI)	Gold	200,000^{‡}
Italy (FIMI)	Gold	35,000^{‡}
Portugal (AFP)	Gold	5,000^{‡}
^{‡} Sales+streaming figures based on certification alone.
