= Believers (Alan Walker song) =

2021 song by Alan Walker and Conor Maynard

Single by Alan Walker and Conor Maynard
- Released: May 14, 2021
- Genre: Dance
- Label: MER
- Songwriters: Gunnar Greve; Carl Hovind; Marcus Arnbekk; Toby Rose; Jonas Jurströ; Victor Thell; Gaute Ormåsen; Mood Melodies; vinni; Conor Maynard; Alan Walker

Alan Walker singles chronology
"Fake a Smile" (2021)	"Believers" (2021)	"Sweet Dreams" (2021)

"Believers" is a song by British-Norwegian DJ Alan Walker and British singer-songwriter Conor Maynard. It was released on May 14, 2021.

== Background ==
They met five years ago when Conor released a video cover of Alan's hit song "Faded" on his YouTube channel, and began working on the song. About the song, Walker said, "Believers is a song I started writing while I was in quarantine from the Corona Disaster. I wanted to write a song that would make people happy and allow them to escape for a little while. When I started thinking about who I wanted to do the vocals, Conor was the first person that came to mind, so I am very happy with the finished song.

About the song, Conor said, "When I released the cover video for 'Faded' five years ago, I never thought I would see the day when I would be able to make an original song with Alan himself. When I received the track for 'Believers,' I couldn't wait to record it, and now I can't wait for everyone to hear it!"

== Music video ==
The music video features Walker and Conor battling the evil organization Red Nexus, combining live-action footage with gameplay videos of Walker's favorite gamers and effects technology to create spectacular visuals.

== Charts ==
Chart (2021)	Peak position
Norway (VG-lista)	24
Sweden (Sverigetopplistan)	64
US Hot Dance/Electronic Songs (Billboard)	26
