= On My Way (Alan Walker, Sabrina Carpenter, and Farruko song) =

2019 single by Alan Walker, Sabrina Carpenter and Farruko

Single by Alan Walker, Sabrina Carpenter and Farruko

from the album World of Walker
- Language: English; Spanish
- Released: 21 March 2019
- Genre: Moombahton
- Length: 3:13
- Label: MER; Sony
- Songwriters: Julia Karlsson; Gunnar Greve; Franklin Jovani Martinez; Marcos G. Pérez; Fredrik Borch Olsen; Jesper Borgen; Carlos Efrén Reyes Rosado; Sabrina Carpenter; Alan Walker; Øyvind Sauvik; Anders Frøen; Anton Rundberg
- Producers: Alan Walker; Big Fred

Alan Walker singles chronology
"Are You Lonely" (2019)	"On My Way" (2019)	"Live Fast" (2019)

Sabrina Carpenter singles chronology
"Sue Me" (2018)	"On My Way" (2019)	"In My Bed" (2019)

Farruko singles chronology
"Si De Da" (2018)	"On My Way" (2019)	"Calma" (Alicia remix) (2019)

Audio sample
- "On My Way": file; help

Music videos
- "On My Way" on YouTube; "On My Way" (alternative version) on YouTube

"On My Way" is a song by Norwegian DJ and record producer Alan Walker, American singer Sabrina Carpenter and Puerto Rican singer Farruko, released as a single on 21 March 2019 through MER and Sony Music.

== Background and release ==
The song was written by Julia Karlsson, Gunnar Greve, Franklin Jovani Martinez, Marcos G. Pérez, Fredrik Borch Olsen, Jesper Borgen, Øyvind Sauvik, Anders Frøen and Anton Rundberg alongside Walker, Carpenter and Farruko. The production was done by Alan Walker and Big Fred. Karlsson and Carpenter previously worked together on Carpenter's song "Bad Time".

On 9 March 2019, Alan Walker began teasing the song via his social media. On 14 March 2019, Alan Walker formally announced the song along with its release date. After the announcement of the song, rumours circulated that Sabrina Carpenter and Farruko would feature on the song. Alan Walker confirmed their involvement in the song on 19 March 2019. On 20 March 2019, Walker announced that he partnered with PUBG Mobile for the first anniversary of the game, and that the song would be the event's theme song.

== Composition ==
"On My Way" is a song that runs for 3 minutes and 13 seconds. It is composed and songwritten in the key of C♯ minor with a tempo of 85 beats per minute. It features Walker's signature future bass style and lyrically, the song is about getting out of a bad relationship. Walker states in an interview that the song is based on the DJ Okawari song "Flower Dance".

== Music video ==
The music video, directed by Christian Berg, was produced to coincide with the song's release and received 80 million views in just over a month after its release on YouTube; as of February 2024, it has received over 555 million views and 9.7 million likes.

It was later revealed that the video, along with the music videos for Walker's later songs "Alone, pt. II" and "Heading Home," consisting of "Tired," "All Falls Down," "Darkside" and "Diamond Heart," respectively are tied to the events of the previous "World of Walker" tetralogy. Despite this, the later video trilogy is portrayed as a prequel to the original tetralogy." The music video for "Paradise" is set between the two trilogies.

== Alternate video ==
On 10 May 2019, the alternative video was posted on Alan Walker's YouTube channel, encouraging viewers to "choose their path" of either two video versions of Carpenter and Farruko in the official alternative music video, both were posted on their respective channels that same day. The two versions of the alternative music video indicated different searches, pieces of evidence, and artefacts that the female protagonist was searching (depending on the viewer's choice) which led to each versions ending with the same outcome, which is the scene where tombstones with stone formations which were laid on the site, that took place a month before the events of the official music video when the artefacts were being unearthed and discovered.

Alan Walker's interactive alternative video received over 1.7 million views (as of 30 December 2020), while Carpenter and Farruko's alternative music videos received over 13 million views and 34 million views, respectively.

== Live performances ==
Carpenter and Walker performed the song on Good Morning America's Summer Concert Series.

== Track listing ==
Digital download
No.	Title	Length
1.	"On My Way"	3:13

Digital download – Da Tweekaz Remix
No.	Title	Length
1.	"On My Way" (Da Tweekaz Remix)	3:24

== Charts ==
=== Weekly charts ===
Chart (2019)	Peak position
China Airplay/FL (Billboard)	7
Czech Republic Singles Digital (ČNS IFPI)	46
Finland (Suomen virallinen lista)	12
Germany (GfK)	85
Greece (IFPI)	56
Hungary (Single Top 40)	2
Hungary (Stream Top 40)	19
Ireland (IRMA)	69
Japan Hot 100 (Billboard)	66
Lithuania (AGATA)	31
Malaysia (RIM)	1
New Zealand Hot Singles (RMNZ)	31
Norway (VG-lista)	3
Poland Airplay (ZPAV)	39
Romania (Airplay 100)	40
Singapore (RIAS)	10
Slovakia Airplay (ČNS IFPI)	15
Slovakia Singles Digital (ČNS IFPI)	51
South Korea (Gaon)	131
Sweden (Sverigetopplistan)	30
Switzerland (Schweizer Hitparade)	34
Switzerland (Media Control Romandy)	15
UK Dance (Official Charts)	34
US Dance Club Songs (Billboard)	7
US Hot Dance/Electronic Songs (Billboard)	8

=== Year-end charts ===
Chart (2019)	Position
Malaysia (RIM)	10
Norway (VG-lista)	15
Switzerland (Schweizer Hitparade)	99
US Hot Dance/Electronic Songs (Billboard)	19

== Certifications ==
Region	Certification	Certified units/sales
Austria (IFPI Austria)	Gold	15,000^{‡}
Canada (Music Canada)	Gold	40,000^{‡}
France (SNEP)	Gold	100,000^{‡}
Mexico (AMPROFON)	3× Platinum	180,000^{‡}
New Zealand (RMNZ)	Gold	15,000^{‡}
Poland (ZPAV)	Gold	10,000^{‡}
Portugal (AFP)	Gold	5,000^{‡}
Spain (Promusicae)	Gold	30,000^{‡}
United Kingdom (BPI)	Silver	200,000^{‡}
Streaming
Sweden (GLF)	Platinum	8,000,000^{†}
^{‡} Sales+streaming figures based on certification alone.^{†} Streaming-only figures based on certification alone.

== Release history ==
Region	Date	Format	Version	Label	Ref.
Various	21 March 2019	Digital download; streaming	Original	MER, Sony	
Italy	12 April 2019	Contemporary hit radio	Original	MER, Sony	
Various	25 June 2019	Digital download; streaming	Da Tweekaz Remix	MER, Sony	

== See also ==
- List of number-one songs of 2019 (Malaysia)
