= Fake a Smile =

2021 song by Alan Walker and Salem Ilese

Single by Alan Walker and Salem Ilese

from the album World of Walker
- Released: 19 February 2021
- Genre: Dance
- Label: MER
- Songwriters: Winona Oak; Peter Thomas; Haywood; Daniel James; Salem Ilese; Alan Walker
- Producers: Alan Walker; Dreamlab

Alan Walker singles chronology
"Sorry" (2021)	"Fake a Smile" (2021)	"Believers" (2021)

Music video
- "Fake a Smile" on YouTube

"Fake a Smile" is a song by British-Norwegian DJ Alan Walker and American singer-songwriter Salem Ilese. It was released on 19 February 2021.

== Background ==
Walker says of the song, "The story behind Fake A Smile is a really fun one, a process that started almost over a year ago. A friend of mine from Dreamlab, who I worked with on "Different World" a few years ago, first sent me a top line and some simple chords. When I heard the melody, something instantly clicked and I had an idea and vision of what I wanted to do with the track. When you have this kind of intuition from the beginning, you want to keep working on that track.

This time, after hearing the first track, the melody was definitely the beginning of the whole process. I'm very influenced by melodies, so that's what inspires me, and working with Salem Ilese was a really natural progression. I do a lot of research on my own and I wanted to reach out to Salem for this track."

Salem Ilese said of the song, "For me, 'Fake a Smile' is a song about the people in your life who have the power to rescue you from your darkest moments. Those are the people I hold most dear to my heart and wanted to acknowledge in this song. I am honored to be a part of this song with Alan Walker! I hope everyone enjoys it."

== Critical reception ==
Emilia of Out Now Magazine stated, "Fake A Smile is a development of Walker's unique production style, and coupled with Ilese's honest and vulnerable vocals, it shows why these two are two of the hottest artists in music." Jessica Masek of EDM Identity said, "The vibrant visuals enliven the emotional sound, and the stories give the music a unique dynamism. These elements combine to take the listening experience to another dimension."

== Music video ==
The music video begins with a young woman surveying a beautiful landscape. Suddenly, she turns to see a broken-down robot struggling to move behind her. Without hesitation, she pulls a flag out of the ground and valiantly impales the machine. We’re then shown a contrasting side to her world, what looks like a warzone torn apart by similar machines. She traverses down the mountain into the chaos and comes into contact with others fighting the same enemy as her. As they fight the robots all around them, we hear Ilese’s voice singing “demons don’t sleep at night,” possibly alluding to dark thoughts that can disrupt our peace and wreak havoc, like that robot on the mountaintop. As the protagonist and others continue on to take on the army of machines, for a brief moment, she makes eye contact with a man fighting alongside her. Their glances seem to say, “this is scary, but we can do this.” With an army of her own behind her, she doesn’t show signs of fear. However, the lyrics of the song seem to suggest that those fighting alongside her know that there’s more going on beneath the surface.

== Charts ==
Chart (2021)	Peak position
Netherlands (Single Tip)	28
Norway (VG-lista)	11
Sweden (Sverigetopplistan)	23
US Hot Dance/Electronic Songs (Billboard)	16
