= Play (K-391, Alan Walker and Martin Tungevaag song) =

Single by K-391, Alan Walker, Tungevaag and Mangoo
- Released: 30 August 2019
- Genre: Electro house
- Length: 2:47
- Label: MER; Liquid State; Sony
- Songwriters: Alan Walker; Alexander Standal Pavelich; Anders Frøen; Edvard Normann; Halvor Folstad; James Njie; Kenneth Nilsen; Kristoffer Haugan; Mattias Brånn; Martin Tungevåg; Øyvind Sauvik
- Producers: Mangoo; K-391; Alan Walker; Tungevaag

K-391 singles chronology
"Lily" (2018)	"Play" (2019)	"End of Time" (2020)

Alan Walker singles chronology
"Live Fast" (2019)	"Play" (2019)	"Choir (Remix)" (2019)

Tungevaag singles chronology
"Springfield" (2015)	"Play" (2019)	"Knockout" (2019)

Mangoo singles chronology
"Madmix 2018 (Norwegian Russ)" (2018)	"Play" (2019)	"Maze" (2020)

Music video
- "Play" (K-391's Video) on YouTube "Play" (Alan Walker's Video) on YouTube "Play" (Tungevaag's Video) on YouTube

"Play" (stylized as "PLAY") is a song recorded by Norwegian DJs K-391, Alan Walker, Tungevaag and Swedish DJ/producer Mangoo. Incorporating uncredited vocals provided by Norwegian recording artist Torine, it was released through MER Musikk, and exclusively licensed to Liquid State, a division of Sony Music, on 30 August 2019. It is a revamp of Mangoo's song "Eurodancer", which was released in 2000.

== Background ==
Walker confessed to Norwegian website 730 that when he started listening to "Eurodancer" many years ago, it was only possible to find it on YouTube, yet everyone listened to it. He added that later, when he started making music himself, he felt the track pretty close to the sound he was inspired by. The release of the new track "Play" was an interactive campaign. The fans followed day per day the development of the song's pre-release in real-time via a live-chat website named www.p74y.com. The purpose of the release was to honour the community of bedroom producers and Youtube users that gave birth to the four authors of the song as music producers and DJs. Linked to this, Walker said, "For me, it's really important to activate my fans and followers in my releases and at the same time encourage them to produce and develop music together with each other and other producers. The release of "Play" is an exact example of that and I’m so excited for when the song will be available for the public." The quartet wanted to ensure that some upcoming stars continue to create new music.

They also created a remix competition of the song for anyone to participate in. The participants had to publish their version or demo on YouTube with the hashtag #PressPlay before Sunday 8 September. After, K-391, Tungevaag and Alan Walker each chose their favourite version. Then, three participants were selected to create their own remix of the track. Each worked with one of the three DJs. In the end, this competition allowed several thousand people to participate in the world. The three remixes were released on 4 October 2019, before the release of the second pack of remixes on 25 October 2019.

Among this second pack was a remix by Taiwanese electronic music duo G5SH. According to Asian online edition of British magazine Mixmag, they only discovered the event a day before the deadline, which forced them to start the remix immediately and to complete it within 10 hours. Despite this, they managed to be selected for inclusion in the pack. On this occasion, DJ M.A.T.H, one half of the duo, said, "When I received the message on 23 October [...] we were excited to find out that it was true." They then shared their contentment with their fans on Facebook.

== Critical reception ==
Writing for EDM.com, Lennon Cihak described the song as "euphoric from start to finish". He described the DJs as "heavy, punchy, and tight". He noticed too that the original track has the perfect blend of melodic elements for Alan Walker and K-391 to assemble an equally as jaw-dropping refresh. He remarked K-391 influences by the use of percussion elements, and also a resemblance to "Faded" style and all the melodies the listeners are used to hear with Alan Walker. In the same way, Valentin Malfroy from aficia says that the song is endowed with "a very recognizable imprint of Alan Walker". Scandipop called the song "a downtempo and dreamy dance track" that perfectly corresponds to Alan Walker style.

== Track listing ==
Digital download
No.	Title	Length
1.	"Play"	2:47

Digital download – Remixes, Vol. 1
No.	Title	Length
1.	"Play – Norda & K-391 Remix" (featuring Mangoo & Norda)	2:42
2.	"Play – Niya & Alan Walker Remix" (featuring Mangoo & Niya)	2:36
3.	"Play – B2A, Anklebreaker & Tungevaag Remix" (featuring Mangoo, B2A & Anklebreaker)	2:42

Digital download – Remixes, Vol. 2
No.	Title	Length
1.	"Play – Tobu Remix" (featuring Mangoo & Tobu)	3:08
2.	"Play – ElementD Remix" (featuring Mangoo & ElementD)	3:00
3.	"Play – G5SH Remix" (featuring Mangoo & G5SH)	2:44
4.	"Play – Di Young Remix" (featuring Mangoo & Di Young)	2:34
5.	"Play – INFANCTUS Remix" (featuring Mangoo & INFANCTUS)	3:22

== Charts ==
Chart performance for "Play"
Chart (2019–2020)	Peak position
Austria (Ö3 Austria Top 40)	44
Czech Republic Airplay (ČNS IFPI)	9
Finland (Suomen virallinen lista)	11
Norway (VG-lista)	2
Sweden (Sverigetopplistan)	25
Switzerland (Schweizer Hitparade)	78
US Hot Dance/Electronic Songs (Billboard)	32

== Certifications ==
Certifications for "Play"
Region	Certification	Certified units/sales
Canada (Music Canada)	Gold	40,000^{‡}
Norway (IFPI Norway)	2× Platinum	120,000^{‡}
^{‡} Sales+streaming figures based on certification alone.
