= Live Fast =

Single by Alan Walker and ASAP Rocky
- Released: 25 July 2019
- Genre: Trap
- Length: 3:45
- Label: MER; Sony
- Songwriters: Anders Frøen; Kameron Alexander; Kevin Hogdahl; Rakim Mayers; Alan Walker; Fredrik Borch Olsen; Jonas Engelschiøn Mjåset; Pål Håkon Sundsbø
- Producers: Alan Walker; Aden Foyer (credited as Jonas Aden); Mood Melodies; Paul Hers; Fredrik Borch Olsen (co.); Gunnar Greve (exec.); Jakob Emtestam (exec.)

Alan Walker singles chronology
"On My Way" (2019)	"Live Fast" (2019)	"Play" (2019)

ASAP Rocky singles chronology
"Energy" (2019)	"Live Fast" (2019)	"Babushka Boi" (2019)

Music video
- "Live Fast" on YouTube

"Live Fast" (stylized as Live Fast (PUBGM)) is a song recorded by British-Norwegian DJ Alan Walker and American rapper A$AP Rocky. It contains uncredited vocals provided by American singer and songwriter Kameron Alexander. It was released as a single on 25 July 2019 through MER and Sony Music for the promotion of the mobile application version of video game PUBG.

== Background ==
The vocals of the song were recorded before the incarceration of ASAP Rocky, due to an altercation in the streets of Stockholm, in Sweden, on 30 July. After the release, Alan Walker posted a message on Instagram to thank all his staff and appeal to justice for the rapper : "The challenges and controversy surrounding Rocky’s arrest and upcoming trial in Sweden has affected all of us through the last weeks. [...] But I would like to speak out for fair treatment and a quick resolution for the sake of everyone involved." The track marks the second collaboration in electronic domain for ASAP Rocky after "Wild for the Night" by Skrillex in 2013. The rapper refers to it in the lyrics of the song when he says "2013 I went wild for night, in 2019 I’m getting out ’fore I die". The song serves as the official anthem for PUBG Mobile, a battle royale game on Android and iOS, which has 50 millions active daily users. Alan Walker has already made some songs for the video game community, like his first single for PUBG, "On My Way", which was released on 21 March 2019, celebrating the first anniversary of the game. He worked too on an official remix of League of Legends theme. The official live was performed on 26 July at PUBG Mobile Club Open Spring Split Global Finals in Berlin, one day after the release. In the same way, Alan Walker said on Twitter : "I had the pleasure of performing my brand new single #LiveFast live for the first time at the opening of the @PUBGMOBILE #PMCO Spring Split Global Finals in Berlin! If you missed the livestream I’ve uploaded my full performance here…" During the week of the release, Alan Walker invited his fans to log in to PUBG Mobile to win the chance to hear the song, in completing the DJ's challenges to unlock it.

== Critical reception ==
Professional ratings
Review scores
Source	Rating
Verdens Gang	4/6 stars

Kat Bein from Billboard described the song as "a downtempo mantra that begs for hope in the emotional trenches". Aron A. from HotNewHipHop noted that Alan Walker "drops off a smooth, electronic-infused beat while Rocky swings in with two new verses". Writing for Your EDM, Matthew Meadow remarked that the meaning of the lyrics, written before ASAP Rocky incarceration, "rings truer now than ever". Markos Papadatos from Digital Journal deemed the song "so different than anything Alan Walker has done previously". He noted that it "fuses electronic music well with rap and hip-hop", while "A$AP Rocky showcases his rich, rap vocals, coupled by Walker's stunning production". James Todoroski of We Rave You said, "A$AP, who recorded his verses on this song before his incarceration, has such weighty lyrics that they fit perfectly with the song's dark, brooding atmosphere." Tor Martin Bøe of Verdens Gang said, "There's very little in the way of arrangements or melodies that evoke the sentimental electronica he's known for. This is a separate category for gamers. It's a slightly stern hip-hop anthem with a strong chorus and a suitably upbeat atmosphere, perfect for a login screen." Tiffany of EDM Tunes said, "The lyrics have a chilling weight to them, which resonates even more amid Rocky's recent troubles." The DJ wished to note that the message of the song is to live fast and to avoid monotony. He remarked that the lyrics fit perfectly with the current context of the rapper. In an interview he said : "The lyrics are totally his, I sent him the production and he sent the lyrics and I liked it; it's something that came up in a few days and was amazing and I'm very proud of it."

== Music video ==
The official music video of the song was released at the same day through Alan Walker's YouTube channel. There are real actors portraying PUBG Mobile game themes, which are for most of them soldiers, walking in a dark atmosphere, in transit or aiming weapons in desolate locales.

== Credits and personnel ==
Credits adapted from Tidal.

- Alan Walker – production, composition
- Jonas Engelschiøn Mjåset – production, composition
- Pål Håkon Sundsbø – production, composition
- Anders Frøen – production, composition, lyrics
- Kameron Alexander – uncredited vocals, composition, lyrics
- Kevin Hogdahl – composition, lyrics
- Rakim Mayers – lead vocals, composition, lyrics
- Fredrik Borch Olsen – composition, co-production
- Sören von Malmborg – mix engineering, master engineering
- Gunnar Greve – executive production
- Jakob Emtestam – executive production

== Charts ==
Chart (2019)	Peak position
CIS Airplay (TopHit)	21
Hungary (Single Top 40)	21
Norway (VG-lista)	24
Russia Airplay (TopHit)	18
Sweden Heatseeker (Sverigetopplistan)	11
