= Alone, Pt. II =

2019 single by Alan Walker and Ava Max

Single by Alan Walker and Ava Max

from the album World of Walker
- Released: 27 December 2019
- Length: 2:59
- Label: MER; Sony
- Songwriters: Alan Walker; Erik Smaaland; Markus Arnbekk; Carl Hovind; Fredrik Borch Olsen; Gunnar Greve; Alexander Standal Pavelich; Ava Max; Halvor Folstad; Dag Holtan-Hartwig; Moa Pettersson Hammar; Øyvind Sauvik
- Producers: Walker; Erik Smaaland; Arnbekk (co.); Cirkut (co.); Hovind (co.); Big Fred (co.)

Alan Walker singles chronology
| "Avem (The Aviation Theme)" (2019) | "Alone, Pt. II" (2019) | "End of Time" (2020) |

Ava Max singles chronology
| "Salt" (2019) | "Alone, Pt. II" (2019) | "Kings & Queens" (2020) |

Music video
- "Alone, Pt. II" on YouTube

"Alone, Pt. II" is a song by Norwegian DJ and record producer Alan Walker and American singer-songwriter Ava Max, released by Sony Music on 27 December 2019. It is a sequel to Walker's single "Alone" (2016). Many remixes of the song were published, among which those by Rave Republic, Toby Romeo, RetroVision, Da Tweekaz, and one by Alex Skrindo, in collaboration with Sebastian Wibe. Much like the original, "Alone, Pt. II" also garnered critical acclaim. The song reached the top 10 in Belgium, The Czech Republic, Norway, Poland, and Romania. A sequel to the song titled "Better Off (Alone, Pt. III)" was released on 28 September 2023.

== Critical reception ==
Jason Lipshutz of Billboard praised the song, stating that it "demonstrates the evolution of Walker’s production techniques". He also described Max's vocals as "a moment designed for glass-clinking, unified swaying and other forms of party camaraderie".

== Music videos ==
The official music video of the song was uploaded on Walker's YouTube channel on 27 December 2019. It is the sequel to the video of Walker's 2016 single "Alone". The Kristian Berg directed video was filmed in the Vietnamese province of Quảng Bình between 2 and 10 April 2019, in locations such as the Sơn Đoòng cave, Tróoc river, Chay river, Tra Ang bridge, Doong village, En cave and Nuoc Nut cave. A second video, also directed by Kristian Berg, was released on 17 February 2020, and was filmed live at the Château de Fontainebleau castle in France. As of April 2025, the video has amassed over 431 million views and 5.8 million likes.

== Personnel ==
Credits adapted from Tidal.

- Alan Walker – producer, songwriting, programmer
- Ava Max – vocals, songwriting
- Erik Smaaland – producer, songwriting
- Henry Walter – songwriting, vocal producer, co-producer, background vocals
- Markus Arnbekk – songwriting, background vocals, co-producer, guitar, programmer
- Carl Hovind – songwriting, co-producer, programmer
- Fredrik Borch Olsen – songwriting
- Gunnar Greve – songwriting, executive producer
- Alexander Standal Pavelich – songwriting, guitar
- Halvor Folstad – songwriting
- Dag Holtan-Hartwig – songwriting
- Moa Pettersson Hammar – songwriting
- Øyvind Sauvik – songwriting
- Big Fred – co-producer, programmer
- Jakob Emtestam – executive producer
- Sören von Malmborg – mastering engineer, mixing engineer

== Charts ==
=== Weekly charts ===
| Chart (2020–2021) | Peak position |
|---|---|
| Austria (Ö3 Austria Top 40) | 45 |
| Belgium (Ultratop 50 Flanders) | 8 |
| Belgium (Ultratop 50 Wallonia) | 7 |
| Croatia (HRT) | 26 |
| Czech Republic Airplay (ČNS IFPI) | 10 |
| Finland (Suomen virallinen lista) | 18 |
| France (SNEP) | 68 |
| Germany (GfK) | 47 |
| Greece (IFPI) | 95 |
| Hungary (Dance Top 40) | 11 |
| Hungary (Rádiós Top 40) | 6 |
| Hungary (Single Top 40) | 17 |
| Netherlands (Dutch Top 40) | 6 |
| Netherlands (Single Top 100) | 15 |
| New Zealand Hot Singles (RMNZ) | 26 |
| Norway (VG-lista) | 4 |
| Poland Airplay (ZPAV) | 4 |
| Romania (Airplay 100) | 3 |
| South Korea BGM (Circle) | 45 |
| Sweden (Sverigetopplistan) | 25 |
| Switzerland (Schweizer Hitparade) | 47 |
| US Hot Dance/Electronic Songs (Billboard) | 11 |

2025 weekly chart performance
| Chart (2025) | Peak position |
|---|---|
| Hungary (Rádiós Top 40) | 33 |

2026 weekly chart performance
| Chart (2026) | Peak position |
|---|---|
| Hungary (Rádiós Top 40) | 35 |

=== Year-end charts ===
| Chart (2020) | Position |
|---|---|
| Belgium (Ultratop Flanders) | 26 |
| Belgium (Ultratop Wallonia) | 25 |
| Hungary (Dance Top 40) | 64 |
| Hungary (Rádiós Top 40) | 61 |
| Hungary (Single Top 40) | 79 |
| Netherlands (Dutch Top 40) | 5 |
| Netherlands (Single Top 100) | 44 |
| Poland (ZPAV) | 27 |
| Romania (Airplay 100) | 14 |
| US Hot Dance/Electronic Songs (Billboard) | 47 |

| Chart (2021) | Position |
|---|---|
| Hungary (Dance Top 40) | 33 |

| Chart (2022) | Position |
|---|---|
| Hungary (Dance Top 40) | 70 |

== Certifications ==
| Region | Certification | Certified units/sales |
|---|---|---|
| Austria (IFPI Austria) | Platinum | 30,000^{‡} |
| Belgium (BRMA) | Gold | 20,000^{‡} |
| Denmark (IFPI Danmark) | Gold | 45,000^{‡} |
| France (SNEP) | Platinum | 200,000^{‡} |
| Germany (BVMI) | Gold | 200,000^{‡} |
| Italy (FIMI) | Gold | 35,000^{‡} |
| New Zealand (RMNZ) | Gold | 15,000^{‡} |
| Norway (IFPI Norway) | 4× Platinum | 240,000^{‡} |
| Poland (ZPAV) | Platinum | 20,000^{‡} |
| Spain (Promusicae) | Gold | 30,000^{‡} |
| United Kingdom (BPI) | Silver | 200,000^{‡} |
Streaming
| Sweden (GLF) | Platinum | 8,000,000^{†} |
^{‡} Sales+streaming figures based on certification alone.^{†} Streaming-only figures based on certification alone.
