= Ella Marie Hætta Isaksen =

Norwegian Sami musician (born 1998)

Ella Marie
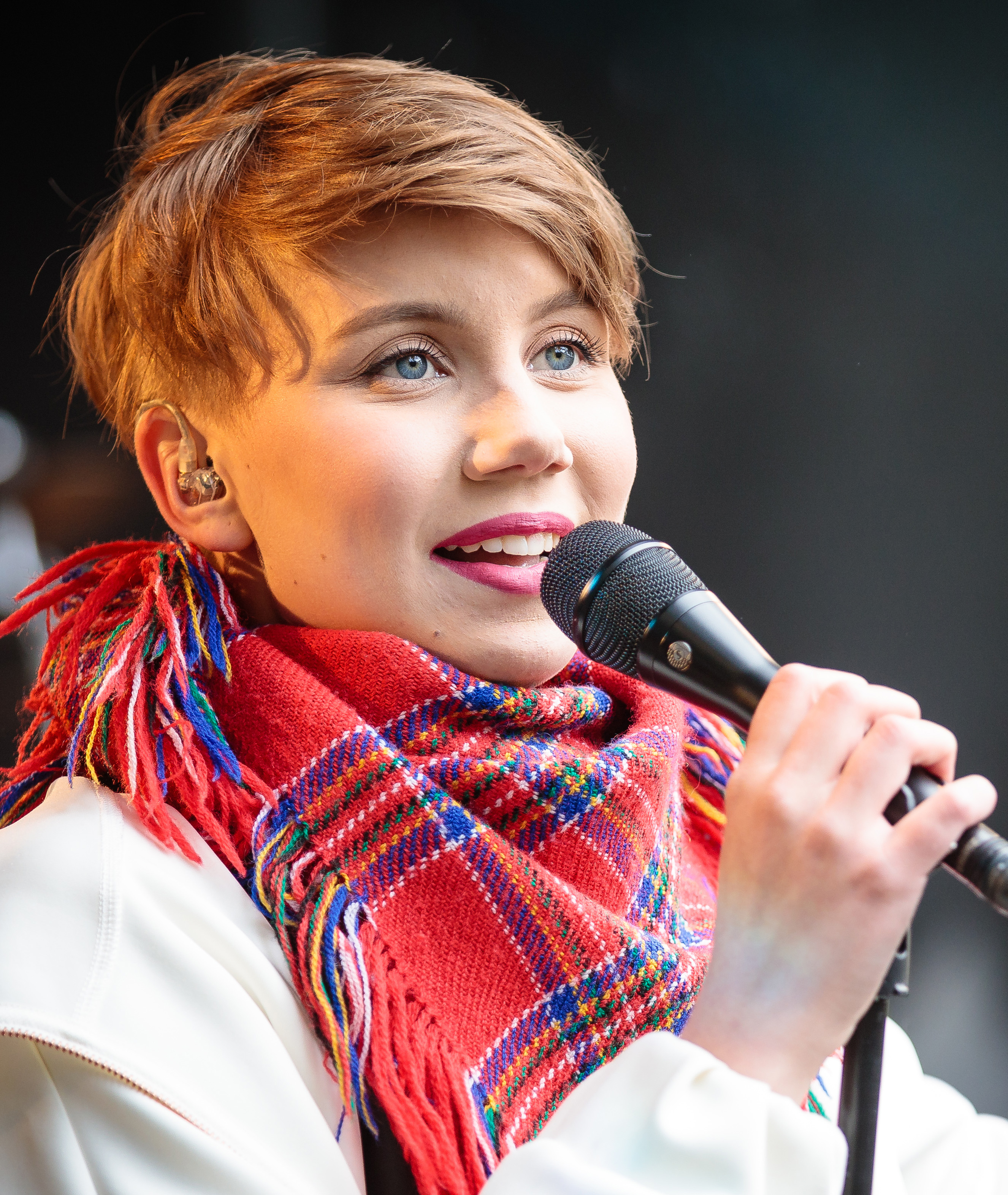
- Isaksen in Oslo, 2018

Background information
- Born: Ella Marie Hætta Isaksen; 25 April 1998 (age 28); Tana, Norway
- Genres: Electronic; joik; electropop; synth-pop
- Occupations: Singer; songwriter; environmentalist; activist; actress
- Years active: 2015–present
- Website: isakband.no

Ella Marie Hætta Isaksen (born 25 April 1998) is a Sámi singer, songwriter, environmentalist, activist, and actress.

== Early life ==
She was born on 25 April 1998 in Tana, Finnmark, Norway. Her native language is Northern Sámi.

== Career ==
In 2016 she won the Sámi Grand Prix with her original song Luoddaearru, and in 2017 she won Liet International with the same song. In 2017 Isaksen started the band ISÁK. In October 2018 she won the NRK-show Stjernekamp.

She was the county leader in the environmental protection organization Natur og Ungdom from January 2015 until January 2016. She continued her work in the organization until she was hired as a campaign secretary in Natur og Ungdom in the autumn of 2017. Furthermore, she was elected to the central board of the organization in January 2018, where she sat for six months.

She made her acting debut in Let the River Flow, which had its Swedish premiere in Jokkmokk on 4 May 2023. She received a Norwegian Film Critics Award for Best Actress for her performance as Ester.

She was the lead vocalist for the Sami electronic-joik band Isák which consists of herself, producer Daniel Eriksen and drummer Aleksander Kostopoulos. The band announced their break up in May 2023, with their last concert being played at Rockefeller Music Hall in September.
