= Ruben (singer) =

Norwegian singer

Ruben Markussen
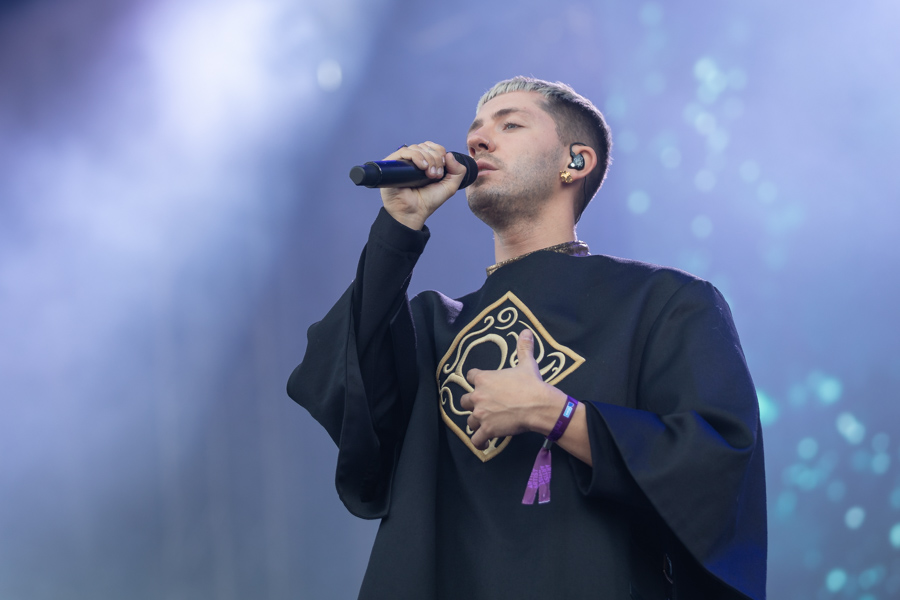

Background information
- Also known as: Ruben
- Born: 23 March 1995 (age 31); Harstad, Norway
- Origin: Bjarkøy, Norway
- Genres: Pop; electropop
- Occupations: Singer; songwriter
- Years active: 2016–present
- Label: Universal
- Website: rubenofficial.com

Ruben Markussen (born 23 March 1995), known mononymously as Ruben, is a Norwegian singer and songwriter. He grew up in Bjarkøy, a small village of 300 inhabitants in Harstad, northern Norway. His debut single "Walls" charted in Norway on the basis of huge streaming online charting on VG-lista, the official Norwegian Singles Chart, making it to number 8. As a result, he moved to Oslo to further his career. He was nominated for the Norwegian P3 Gold 2018 award in 2018 "Newcomer" category for the song during Spellemannprisen, receiving a scholarship. His follow up "Lay by Me" has charted in Norway, reaching number 8. Both singles also charted in Sweden. He is signed to Universal Records in Norway.

== Discography ==
=== Extended plays ===
Title	Year	Peak positions
Title	Year	NOR
East West (with Tom Has)	2016	—
Melancholic	2019	—
Animosity	2021	6
Tonic Emotions Pt.1	2023	—
"—" denotes a recording that did not chart.

=== Singles ===
Title	Year	Peak positions		Certifications	Album / EP
Title	Year	NOR	SWE	Certifications	Album / EP
"Walls"	2017	8	59	IFPI NOR: 3× Platinum; GLF: Platinum	Melancholic
"The Half"	2018	20	—	IFPI NOR: Platinum	Melancholic
"Lay by Me"	2018	8	28	IFPI NOR: Platinum; GLF: Platinum; IFPI DEN: Gold	Melancholic
"Power"	2019	30	—		Melancholic
"So High"	2019	14	—		Non-album singles
"As Long as I Break Your Heart"	2019	—	—		Non-album singles
"Heading Home" (with Alan Walker)	2020	15	53		World of Walker
"Burn Down This Room"	2020	19	—		Animosity
"Dear God"	2020	18	—		Animosity
"Mama Don't Know"	2021	—	—		Animosity
"Running"	2021	27	—		Animosity
"Candy"	2021	—	—		Non-album singles
"Du lyg"	2025	31	—		Non-album singles
"Det går bra" (with Julie Bergan)	2025	11	—		Non-album singles
"Der du brente vår bro" (with Miriam Bryant)	2026	45	—		Non-album singles
"Ser du månen?"	2026	31	—		Non-album singles
"—" denotes a recording that did not chart or was not released.
