= Salem Ilese =

American singer and songwriter

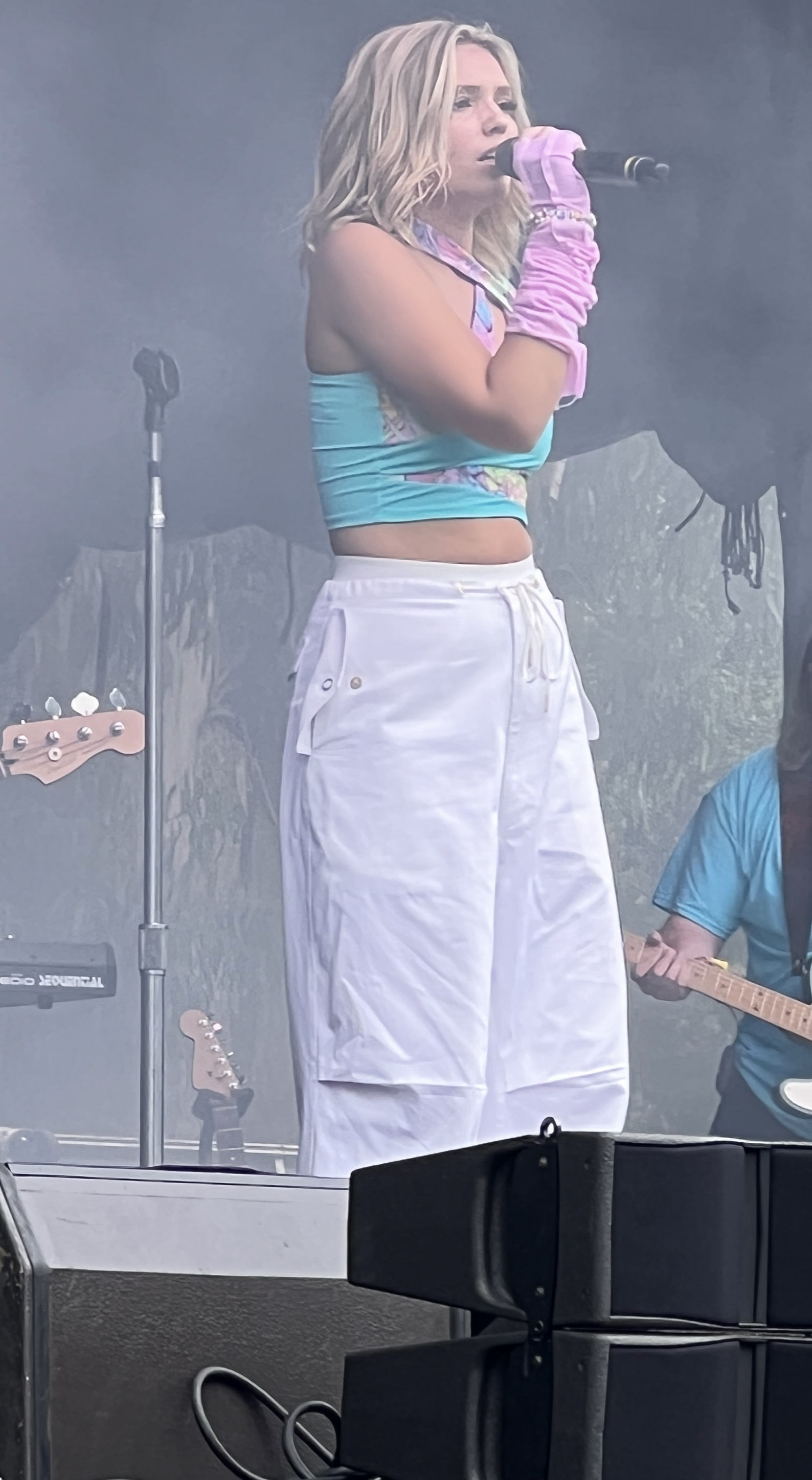
- Ilese performing in 2022

Background information
- Born: Salem Ilese Davern; August 19, 1999 (age 27); Mill Valley, California, U.S.
- Origin: Mill Valley, California
- Genre: Pop
- Occupations: Singer; songwriter
- Instruments: Vocals; guitar; keyboards; ukulele
- Years active: 2018–present
- Label: 10K Projects
- Website: www.salemilese.com

Salem Ilese Davern (born August 19, 1999) is an American singer-songwriter. She is known for her singles "Mad at Disney" and "PS5", and has also co-written songs for artists such as Ava Max, Bella Poarch, Demi Lovato, and Illit. In 2019, she released her debut EP, 757, and in 2023, she released her debut studio album, High Concept.

== Early life ==
Born on August 19, 1999, Salem Ilese Davern is originally from Mill Valley, California. Her songwriting career began at the age of 10 when she began classes with Bonnie Hayes (songwriter for Bonnie Raitt and Cher) in San Francisco. She also attended Berklee College of Music and spent two years majoring in Hayes' songwriting program.

== Career ==
Ilese moved to Los Angeles, where she signed to Homemade Projects and released her debut EP, 757, in 2019.

In 2020, Ilese released the song, "Mad at Disney" after a series of Disney live-action remakes which drew the ire of fans. It became her breakout hit because of its popularity on social media platforms such as TikTok and was certified by the RIAA. The song peaked at number 67 on the Billboard Global 200 in 2020, and appeared on the Rolling Stone Top 100 Popular Songs in 2020.

Additionally, Ilese co-wrote Jamie Miller's "Here's Your Perfect", ILLIT's "Magnetic", Bella Poarch's "Build a Bitch", and Tomorrow X Together's "Anti-Romantic". Her second EP (L)only Child was released with a food truck in May and collaborated with Alan Walker on "Fake a Smile".

Her other song, "Crypto Boy", rose in popularity in social media including YouTube Shorts and TikTok.

She also wrote and sung with Tomorrow X Together, produced by Alan Walker, the song PS5 in 2022 which was a success on social media.

In July 2023, she announced that she would release her debut album, High Concept, on September 15, 2023. The album was promoted with the release of several singles including "Strongly Worded Letter" and "PainHub".

== Artistry ==
AllMusic's Marcy Donelson described Ilese's style as "dissatisfied, relationship-themed dance-pop". Ilese often writes songs around a single concept. She considers brand and product names help songs gain traction.

Writing for NBC News, Morgan Sung noted that some social media users complained about a particular style of music which new artists use to try to break out on TikTok. Marked by a nostalgic melody and simple lyrics attempting to be relatable, the "mad at Disney genre" has been criticized as unoriginal and inauthentic. Sung cited examples such as Ilese's "Mad at Disney" and Gayle's "ABCDEFU".

== Discography ==
=== Studio albums ===
- High Concept (2023)
- Growing Down (2025)
- (I Should Probably Let You Go) (2026)

=== Extended plays ===
- 757 (2019)
- (L)only Child (2021)
- Unsponsored Content (2022)

== Songwriting credits ==
Songwriting credits
Year	Artist	Track
2018	Salem Ilese	"Awake"
2019	Salem Ilese	"Impatient"
2019	Salem Ilese	"Numbers Game"
2019	Salem Ilese	"Roshambo"
2019	Salem Ilese	"Time Machine"
2019	Salem Ilese	"757"
2019	Salem Ilese	"Bad Word"
2020	Salem Ilese	"Mad at Disney"
2020	Salem Ilese	"It Gets Better"
2020	Salem Ilese	"Roses to His Ex"
2020	Salem Ilese	"Marry Christmas"
2020	Salem Ilese	"Coke & Mentos"
2020	Gattuso	"Love Is Not Enough" (featuring Salem Ilese)
2020	Myrne	"Splinter" (with Salem Ilese)
2020	TIMMS	"Itsy Bitsy"
2020	Lev	"When I Hurt You"
2021	Salem Ilese	"Ben & Jerry"
2021	Salem Ilese	"Hey Siri"
2021	Salem Ilese	"(L)only Child"
2021	Salem Ilese	"Good, Not Great"
2021	Salem Ilese	"Romeo & Juliet"
2021	Salem Ilese	"Dinosaurs"
2021	Salem Ilese	"Forgiveness"
2021	Salem Ilese	"About a Breakup"
2021	Salem Ilese	"Thank You Note"
2021	Surfaces	"Come with Me" (featuring Salem Ilese)
2021	Alan Walker	"Fake a Smile" (featuring Salem Ilese)
2021	LLusion	"Yoga" (featuring Salem Ilese)
2021	Imanbek	"Dancing On Dangerous"
2021	Sean Paul	"Dancing On Dangerous"
2021	Sofía Reyes	"Dancing On Dangerous"
2021	Mia Rodriguez	"Billion Dollar Bitch"
2021	MASN	"Don't Talk"
2021	Jamie Miller	"Here's Your Perfect"
2021	TXT	"Anti-Romantic"
2021	Bella Poarch	"Build a Bitch"
2021	Bella Poarch	"Inferno"
2022	Salem Ilese	"Jake from State Farm"
2022	Salem Ilese	"PS5" (with TXT & Alan Walker)
2022	Salem Ilese	"Crypto Boy"
2022	Salem Ilese	"ExBox"
2022	Salem Ilese	"Secret Santa"
2022	Salem Ilese	"Moment Of Silence"
2022	Salem Ilese	"Intuition" (Blade Runner Black Lotus)
2022	Taeyeon	"Toddler"
2022	Pussy Riot	"Princess Charming"
2022	Anson Seabra	"Hard To Be Human"
2022	Demi Lovato	Holy Fvck ("Holy Fvck" and "City of Angels")
2022	Bella Poarch	Dolls ("No Man's Land (feat. Grimes)")
2022	Sub Urban	"UH OH!" (with BENEE)
2022	Le Sserafim	"Good Parts (When the Quality Is Bad but I Am)"
2022	CG5	"MINION" (with Salem Ilese)
2022	Sam Feldt	"Hate Me" (with Salem Ilese)
2022	Imanbek	"Married to Your Melody" (with Salem Ilese)
2022	Rxseboy	"Nice to Meet Me"
2022	Au/Ra	"Nice to Meet Me"
2023	Mike Posner	"Howling at the Moon" (with Salem Ilese))
2023	Salem Ilese	"The Trailer"
2023	Salem Ilese	"2much2think"
2023	Salem Ilese	"Team Sport"
2023	Salem Ilese	"Boys "R" Us"
2023	Salem Ilese	"PainHub"
2023	Salem Ilese	"Tall Boi"
2023	Salem Ilese	"Ketchup"
2023	Salem Ilese	"don't shop when ur hungry !!" (with. vaultboy)
2023	Salem Ilese	"Spaghetti"
2023	Salem Ilese	"Threesome"
2023	Salem Ilese	"Strongly Worded Letter"
2023	Salem Ilese	"Designated Driver"
2023	Salem Ilese	"Taylor Made"
2023	Salem Ilese	"Can of Hurt"
2023	Salem Ilese	"Whiplash"
2023	Salem Ilese	"Snowglobe"
2024	Salem Ilese	"12 Months of Christmas"
2024	Salem Ilese	"Christmas Mourning"
2024	JAX	"holiday"
2024	Alexa	"Joy of Missing Out"
2024	Illit	"Magnetic"
2024	eaJ	"Mad"
2024	eaJ	"Burn" (with Salem Ilese)
2024	Ofenbach	"feelings don't lie" (with Salem Ilese)
2024	Zedd	"No Gravity"
2024	Jordana Bryant	"Taylor For President"
2024	TXT	"Sugar Rush Ride",
2024	TXT	"Open Always Wins"
2024	Ava Max	"Spot a Fake"
2024	V	"FRI(END)S"
2024	Emei	"Agree to Disagree"
2024	Cheat Codes	"TYSM" (with Salem Ilese)
2024	vaultboy	"closer" (with Salem Ilese)
2024	mafalda cardenal	"tu fan" (with Salem Ilese)
2024	TIMMS	"Resting Sad Face"
2024	Jamie Miller	"Untie The Knot"
2024	Bella Poarch	"Don't Like Anybody"
2024	6arelyhuman	"Don't Like Anybody"
2025	Salem Ilese	"IM NOT SCARED"
2025	Salem Ilese	"hahaha"
2025	Salem Ilese	"if you love me..
2025	Salem Ilese	"fridge"
2025	Salem Ilese	"growing down"
2025	Salem Ilese	"dirty martini"
2025	Salem Ilese	"new in town"
2025	Salem Ilese	"storm"
2025	Salem Ilese	"Merry Chirtmas From Australia" (with Go-Jo)
2025	Harvey Brittain	"all in" (with Salem Ilese)
2025	HITGS	"GROSS"
2025	Alemeda	"I'm Over It"
2025	yung kai	"tell me (a lullaby)"
2025	Dayoung	"number one rockstar"
2025	Ofenbach	"Need You The Most"
2026	Frank Walker	"All Cried Out" (with Salem Ilese)
2026	Ari Abdul	"Enamored"
2026	Salem Ilese	"My Bad"
2026	Salem Ilese	"Love Like A Hobby"
