= Different World (Alan Walker album) =

Studio album by Alan Walker
- Released: 14 December 2018
- Recorded: 2015–2018
- Genres: Electro house; future bass; moombahton; trap
- Length: 42:54
- Labels: MER; Sony Music
- Producers: Alan Walker; Gunnar Greve; Jesper Borgen; Steve Aoki; Mood Melodies; Fredrik Olsen; Markus Arnbekk; Big Fred; Kenneth Nilsen; James Njie; Lars Rosness; Dreamlab; The Six; Chris "TEK" O'Ryan; Jenna Andrews; Alex Holmberg; Mere Music; Yann Bargain; Nicholas Gale; Mengzhou Hu; Victor Verpillat; STATE; Carl Hovind

Alan Walker chronology
Faded (2018)	Different World (2018)	Live Fast (2019)

Singles from Different World
- 1. "All Falls Down" Released: 27 October 2017; 2. "Darkside" Released: 27 July 2018; 3. "Diamond Heart" Released: 28 September 2018; 4. "Different World" Released: 30 November 2018

Different World is the debut studio album by Norwegian DJ and record producer Alan Walker. It was released on 14 December 2018 through MER Musikk and Sony Music Entertainment and includes his successful 2015 single "Faded". The album also succeeds a trilogy of releases leading up to the album, entitled World of Walker, which consisted of the singles "All Falls Down", "Darkside" and "Diamond Heart". The album was also nominated for Top Dance/Electronic Albums at the 2020 Billboard Music Awards. To promote the album, Walker embarked on the Different World Tour, spanning 4 months across 29 cities.

== Background ==
Featuring artists such as Steve Aoki, Noah Cyrus, and Digital Farm Animals, the album is noted for its mixture of "recognizable releases" such as "Faded" with "new material" such as "Lost Control". Walker said of the album "It's an incredible feeling to be able to release my debut album, Different World. These last years were absolutely surreal, and I certainly never imagined it would get to that point when I started. very different for me. It's something I've worked on for some time, and I'm super excited to finally share with the world and hear the reaction of my fans!" A campaign for the album was launched, titled "#CreateADifferentWorld". It is to raise awareness regarding the theme of climate change.

== Singles ==
The album's first single "All Falls Down", featuring Noah Cyrus and Digital Farm Animals, was released as the lead single from the album on 27 October 2017. The single peaked at number one on the Norwegian Singles Chart and the US Billboard Dance Club Songs chart.

"Darkside", a song featuring Antiguan-German singer-songwriter Au/Ra and Norwegian singer Tomine Harket, was released as the second single on 27 July 2018. The song was also released with a remix by Dutch DJ Afrojack, which reached number 1 on the Norwegian charts and number 10 on the Swedish charts.

The single "Diamond Heart", featuring Swedish singer-songwriter Sophia Somajo, was released as the third single on September 28, 2018. Two remixes have been officially released, one by Syn Cole and one by Dzeko. The song's music video was nominated for Best Cinematography at the 2019 Berlin Music Video Awards.

The song "Different World", featuring American singer Sofia Carson, Norwegian music producer K-391 and Chinese music producer Corsak, was released as the album's fourth and final single on November 30, 2018. The song was released to coincide with a campaign entitled "#CreateADifferentWorld" and features Walker speaking about the importance of climate change. The song reached number 31 in the Norwegian charts.

The album also included the number-one singles, "Faded" "Sing Me to Sleep" and "Alone", with the former two featured uncredited Naustdal pop singer Iselin Solheim, and the latter featured uncredited singer Noonie Bao.

== Critical reception ==
Professional ratings
Review scores
Source	Rating
Gaffa (Denmark)	6/6 stars
NRK P3	3/6 stars
Verdens Gang	3/6 stars
The Straits Times	3.5/5 stars

Dancing Astronaut wrote that the album "extends the fullest portrait of his distinctive sound" and described it as "a tightly threaded collection of songs, which articulates Walker's sonic artistry." Billboard described it as "turning bleating synth melodies into sing-alongs, melts warm Caribbean rhythms with hardstyle booms, and electrifies the dance floor as much as it aims for radio readiness." Manuel Probst of German music site Dance-Charts says, "Alan Walker's typical sound design runs through Different World like a common thread, creating a special atmosphere with its melancholy melodies. I am creating it. Even though the superstar stays true to his style, his attention to detail allows him to constantly change and give each song his own unique touch". Marit Johansen Jegthaug of NRK P3 said: "There are too few new songs and the album is poorly structured. It lacks variety, dramaturgy, something that would distinguish it from the stagnant singles with a clear distinction between old and new and all over the place". Tor Martin Bøe of Verdens Gang gave the album a "die throw" rating of 3 out of 6, describing it as "manic and gloomy" and stating that "the dark sense of abandonment feels almost tacked on". Anjali Raguraman of The Straits Times described it as a "cinematic, vocals-driven album" and said that "it feels like Walker has played it safe by sticking to what he is familiar with".

== Commercial performance ==
At the time of Billboard's 2019 mid-year report, the album had logged 93,000 equivalent album sales in the United States and "Faded" had amassed 192,396,000 streams.

== Track listing ==
Standard track listing
No.	Title	Writer(s)	Producer(s)	Length
1.	"Intro"	Alan Walker; Markus Arnbekk; Emelie Hollow; James Eriksen; Anna-Marie Kimber	Walker; Arnbekk; James Njie	1:16
2.	"Lost Control" (featuring Sorana)	Walker; Thomas Troelsen; Anders Frøen; Sorana Păcurar; Fredrik Borch Olsen; Magnus Martinsen	Walker; Big Fred^{[a]}; Magnify^{[a]}; Mood Melodies^{[c]}	3:42
3.	"I Don't Wanna Go" (featuring Julie Bergan)	Walker; Edvard Normann; Kristoffer Haugen; Lars Rosness; Jesper Borgen; Fredrik Teo; Gunnar Greve Pettersen; Hollow; Øyvind Sauvik	Walker; Rosness; STATE^{[c]}	2:41
4.	"Lily" (featuring K-391 and Emelie Hollow)	Walker; Rosness; Magnus Bertelsen; Kenneth Nilsen; Didrik Håndlykken; Arnbekk	Walker; K-391; Rosness; Arnbekk; Big Fred	3:15
5.	"Lonely" (featuring Steve Aoki, Isák and Omar Noir)	Walker; Aoki; Olsen; Eriksen; Borgen; Omar Noir Faal; Sauvik; Ella Marie Hætta Isaksen	Walker; Aoki; Njie; Big Fred	3:36
6.	"Do It All for You" (featuring Trevor Guthrie)	Walker; Frøen; Arnbekk; Borgen; Rosness; Haugan; Normann; Jason Dean; Joseph Kirkland; Ryan Stewart	Walker; Arnbekk; Mood Melodies; Rosness^{[a]}; STATE^{[a]}	2:54
7.	"Different World" (featuring K-391, Sofia Carson and Corsak)	Walker; Olsen; Eriksen; Arnbekk; G. Pettersen; Nilsen; Mengzhou Hu; Sara Hjellstrom; Bertelsen	Walker; K-391; Hu Mengzhou; Big Fred; Njie; Arnbekk^{[a]}; Dreamlab^{[c]}	3:22
8.	"Interlude"	Walker; Arnbekk; Borgen	Walker; Arnbekk; Borgen	1:19
9.	"Sing Me to Sleep"	Walker; Borgen; Frøen; G. Pettersen; Thomas La Verdi; Bertelsen; Iselin Solheim	Walker; Borgen; Mood Melodies	3:07
10.	"All Falls Down" (featuring Digital Farm Animals, Noah Cyrus and Juliander)	Walker; Frøen; Richard Boardman; Pablo Bowman; Daniel Boyle; Sarah Blanchard; Nicholas Gale	Walker; Mood Melodies; The Six; Gunnar Greve^{[a]}; Chris "TEK" O'Ryan^{[a]}; Jenna Andrews^{[c]}; Alex Holmberg; Nicholas Gale^{[c]}	3:18
11.	"Darkside" (featuring Au/Ra and Tomine Harket)	Walker; Frøen; Borgen; Rosness; Arnbekk; Olsen; G. Pettersen; La Verdi; Atle Pettersen; Jamie Stenzel; William Wiik Larsen; Andrew Frampton	Walker; Mood Melodies; Olsen; Mere Music	3:31
12.	"Alone"	Walker; Borgen; Frøen; G. Pettersen; Jonnali Parmenius	Walker; Borgen; Mood Melodies; Greve; Olsen^{[a]}	2:40
13.	"Diamond Heart" (featuring Sophia Somajo)	Walker; Troelsen; Haugen; Normann; Frøen; G. Pettersen; Yann Bargain; Victor Verpillat; Olsen; Sophia Somajo	Walker; Mood Melodies; Bargain; Verpillat; Njie^{[a]}; Greve^{[a]}; Big Fred^{[a]}; STATE^{[a]}	4:00
14.	"Faded (Interlude)"	Walker; Hu; G. Pettersen; Rosness; Frøen; Borgen; Eriksen	Walker; Rosness; Corsak; Njie; Borgen^{[a]}; Mood Melodies^{[a]}	0:41
15.	"Faded"	Walker; Borgen; Frøen; G, Pettersen	Walker; Borgen; Mood Melodies	3:32
Total length:				43:02

Japanese bonus tracks
No.	Title	Writer(s)	Producer(s)	Length
16.	"Tired" (featuring Gavin James)	Walker; Frøen; G. Pettersen; Olsen; Rosness; Arnbekk; Gavin Wigglesworth; Oliver Green; Mike Needle; Daniel Bryer	Walker; Mood Melodies; Greve; Olsen; Rosness; Arnbekk; Carl Hovind^{[a]}	3:12
17.	"Routine" (featuring David Whistle)	Walker; Borgen; Frøen; G. Pettersen; David Silva Fernandez	Walker; Borgen; Mood Melodies; Greve; Olsen^{[a]}	2:46
18.	"The Spectre"	Walker; Frøen; Borgen; Rosness; Arnbekk; G. Pettersen; La Verdi	Walker; Rosness; Arnbekk; Mood Melodies; Greve; Olsen^{[a]}	3:13
Total length:				52:18

Notes

- ^{^[a]} signifies a co-producer
- ^{^[c]} signifies a vocal producer
- "Intro" features background vocals from Emelie Hollow and Anna-Marie Kimber.
- "Sing Me to Sleep" features uncredited vocals from Iselin Solheim.
- "Alone" features uncredited vocals from Noonie Bao.
- "Faded" features uncredited vocals from Iselin Solheim.
- "The Spectre" features uncredited vocals from Jesper Borgen.

== Charts ==
=== Weekly charts ===
Chart (2018–19)	Peak position
Australian Albums (ARIA)	122
Austrian Albums (Ö3 Austria)	59
Belgian Albums (Ultratop Flanders)	91
Belgian Albums (Ultratop Wallonia)	137
Canadian Albums (Billboard)	83
Dutch Albums (Album Top 100)	29
Finnish Albums (Suomen virallinen lista)	1
German Albums (Offizielle Top 100)	39
Japan Hot Albums (Billboard Japan)	39
Japanese Albums (Oricon)	36
Latvian Albums (LAIPA)	9
Norwegian Albums (VG-lista)	1
Polish Albums (ZPAV)	31
Swedish Albums (Sverigetopplistan)	15
Swiss Albums (Schweizer Hitparade)	15
US Top Dance Albums (Billboard)	2
US Heatseekers Albums (Billboard)	8

=== Year-end charts ===
Chart (2019)	Position
Belgian Albums (Ultratop Flanders)	185
Dutch Albums (Album Top 100)	60
Swedish Albums (Sverigetopplistan)	51
Swiss Albums (Schweizer Hitparade)	96
US Top Dance/Electronic Albums (Billboard)	7

Chart (2020)	Position
US Top Dance/Electronic Albums (Billboard)	10

Chart (2021)	Position
Norwegian Albums (VG-lista)	34
US Top Dance/Electronic Albums (Billboard)	11

Chart (2022)	Position
US Top Dance/Electronic Albums (Billboard)	17

Chart (2024)	Position
Australian Dance Albums (ARIA)	40

== Certifications ==
Region	Certification	Certified units/sales
Canada (Music Canada)	Platinum	80,000^{‡}
Denmark (IFPI Danmark)	Platinum	20,000^{‡}
France (SNEP)	Gold	50,000^{‡}
Italy (FIMI)	Gold	25,000^{‡}
Mexico (AMPROFON)	Gold	30,000^{‡}
New Zealand (RMNZ)	Platinum	15,000^{‡}
Norway (IFPI Norway)	3× Platinum	60,000^{‡}
Poland (ZPAV)	3× Platinum	60,000^{‡}
Singapore (RIAS)	Platinum	10,000^{*}
Sweden (GLF)	Gold	15,000^{‡}
United Kingdom (BPI)	Gold	100,000^{‡}
United States (RIAA)	Gold	500,000^{‡}
^{*} Sales figures based on certification alone.^{‡} Sales+streaming figures based on certification alone.
