= Sören von Malmborg =

Swedish mixing and mastering engineer

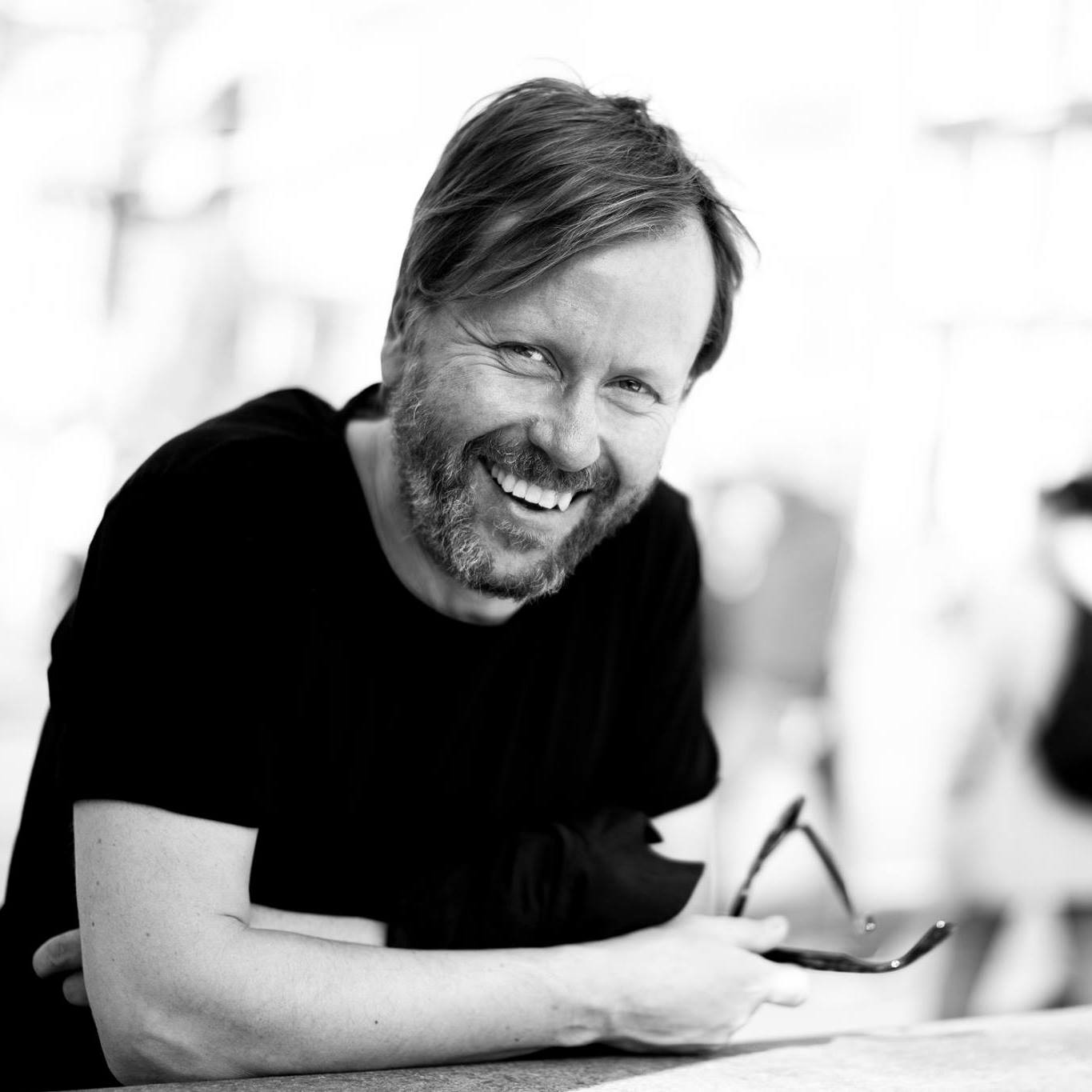

Background information
- Born: Lycksele, Sweden
- Occupations: Mixing and mastering engineer

Sören von Malmborg is a Swedish mixing and mastering engineer. He has worked with artists and songwriters such as Avicii, Alan Walker, Kygo, NONONO, Seeb, Vargas & Lagola, Tove Lo, A$AP Rocky, Noonie Bao, and Dagny.

Von Malmborg worked with Alan Walker on his multi-platinum selling hit single "Faded", which currently has over one billion streams on Spotify and more than 2.3 billion views on YouTube.

== Discography ==
=== Mixing and mastering credits ===
==== Albums ====
Year	Album	Artist	Credits
2009	Just Do the Dada	Dada Life	Mastering engineer
2012	I Am Noonie Bao	Noonie Bao	Mastering engineer
2017	Blood Jungle	Johnossi	Mixing and mastering engineer
2017	Peace	Graveyard	Mixing and mastering engineer
2018	Undertones	NONONO	Mixing and mastering engineer
2018	Everyone Afraid to Be Forgotten	ionnalee	Mastering engineer
2019	Remember the Future	ionnalee	Mastering engineer

==== Songs ====
Year	Title	Artist	Album	Credits
2014	"Hungry Eyes"	NONONO	We Are Only What We Feel	Mixing and mastering engineer
2015	"Not Made for This World"	Tove Lo	Queen of the Clouds (Blueprint Edition)	Mixing and mastering engineer
2016	"Faded"	Alan Walker	Different World	Mixing and mastering engineer
2016	"Sing Me to Sleep"	Alan Walker	Different World	Mixing and mastering engineer
2016	"Lay It on Me"	Ina Wroldsen, Broiler	Non-album single	Mixing and mastering engineer
2016	"Move Your Body (Alan Walker Remix)"	Sia	This Is Acting (Deluxe Version)	Mixing and mastering engineer
2016	"Daydream"	Broiler	Non-album single	Mixing and mastering engineer
2016	"Wake Up Where You Are"	State of Sound	Non-album single	Mixing and mastering engineer
2017	"Stargazing"	Kygo	Stargazing	Mixing and mastering engineer
2017	"First Time"	Kygo	Stargazing	Mixing and mastering engineer
2017	"Never Let You Go" (featuring John Newman)	Kygo	Kids in Love	Mixing and mastering engineer
2017	"Sunrise"	Kygo	Kids in Love	Mixing and mastering engineer
2017	"With You"	Kygo	Kids in Love	Mixing and mastering engineer
2017	"Permanent"	Kygo	Kids in Love	Mixing and mastering engineer
2017	"All Falls Down" (with Noah Cyrus and Digital Farm Animals featuring Juliander)	Alan Walker	Different World	Mixing and mastering engineer
2017	"The Spectre"	Alan Walker	Non-album single	Mixing and mastering engineer
2017	"Masterpiece"	NONONO	Undertones	Mixing and mastering engineer
2017	"Sun Is Shining (Band of Gold)"	Vargas & Lagola	Non-album single	Mixing and mastering engineer
2017	"Cruel World"	Seeb, Skip Marley	Non-album single	Mixing and mastering engineer
2018	"Darkside"	Alan Walker	Different World	Mixing and mastering engineer
2018	"Go to Sleep"	John de Sohn	Non-album single	Mixing and mastering engineer
2018	"Roads"	Vargas & Lagola	Non-album single	Mixing and mastering engineer
2018	"Bad"	Christopher	Under the Surface	Mastering engineer
2018	"Monogamy"	Christopher	Under the Surface	Mastering engineer
2018	"Here"	Sandro Cavazza	Non-album single	Mastering engineer
2018	"Diamond Heart" (featuring Sophia Somajo)	Alan Walker	Different World	Mixing and mastering engineer
2018	"Used To" (featuring Lou Elliote)	Sandro Cavazza	Non-album single	Mastering engineer
2018	"Forgive Me Friend" (featuring Swedish Jam Factory)	Smith & Thell	Telephone Wires	Mixing and mastering engineer
2018	"Mystery" (featuring Wyclef Jean)	K-391	Non-album single	Mixing and mastering engineer
2019	"On My Way" (featuring Sabrina Carpenter and Farruko)	Alan Walker	Non-album single	Mixing and mastering engineer
2019	"Tough Love" (featuring Agnes & Vargas & Lagola)	Avicii	Tim	Mixing engineer (additional)
2019	"Peace of Mind" (featuring Vargas & Lagola)	Avicii	Tim	Mixing engineer (additional)
2019	"Freak" (featuring Bonn)	Avicii	Tim	Mixing engineer (additional)
2019	"We're the Same" (featuring Alexander Tidebrink)	Vigiland	Non-album single	Mixing and mastering engineer
2019	"Selfish"	Vargas & Lagola	Non-album single	Mixing and mastering engineer
2019	"No More 54"	Dada Life	Non-album single	Mixing and mastering engineer
2019	"Enemy"	Sandro Cavazza	Non-album single	Mastering engineer
2019	"Live Fast (PUBGM)"	Alan Walker, A$AP Rocky	Non-album single	Mixing and mastering engineer
2019	"Years"	Astrid S	Down Low	Mixing and mastering engineer
2019	"Play"	K-391, Alan Walker, Tungevaag, Mangoo	Non-album single	Mixing and mastering engineer
2020	"Alone, Pt. II" (featuring Ava Max)	Alan Walker	Non-album single	Mixing and mastering engineer
