= Alone (Alan Walker song) =

Single by Alan Walker

from the album Different World
- Released: 2 December 2016
- Recorded: 2016
- Genre: Electro house
- Length: 2:41
- Label: Mer Musikk
- Songwriters: Alan Walker; Jonnali Parmenius; Jesper Borgen; Anders Frøen; Gunnar Greve Pettersen
- Producers: Alan Walker; Jesper Borgen; Mood Melodies

Alan Walker singles chronology
"Routine" (2016)	"Alone" (2016)	"Back to Beautiful" (2017)

Instrumental remix and remixes cover

Music video
- "Alone" on YouTube

Audio sample
- file; help

"Alone" is a song by Norwegian DJ and record producer Alan Walker. Incorporating uncredited vocals provided by Swedish singer Noonie Bao, it was released commercially for digital download on 2 December 2016. Two sequels to the song were released: "Alone, Pt. II" (2019) and "Better Off (Alone, Pt. III)" (2023). The song garnered critical acclaim upon release.

== Background ==
In a press release on 2 December, Walker stated: "For me, Alone is about cohesion. A song that praises the feeling and comfort of solidarity. When I started making music it was never about to be any [particular], but about creating something for others who could enjoy it with me. What I have experienced by making music and sharing it with [others] are stunning."

== Music video ==
The release of the music video for "Alone" was published on Walker's YouTube channel on 2 December 2016. It has over 1.2 billion views as of October 2021.

The music video explores themes of being alone yet quickly evolves into what seems to be a group effort by Walkers to meet up.

Most of the video was filmed in Norway, focusing on Walker's hometown Bergen, and included panoramic shots of nearby tourist attractions such as Ulriken and Trolltunga in Odda Municipality. Some parts were also filmed at prominent locations in Europe, including Berlin, London and Paris.

In connection with the release of his third official single, he recorded the music video at Ulriken mountain in mid-October. For that, he sought and used over 100 Bergen citizens to supernumerary roles in the production, which was made by the Swedish production company Bror Bror.

== Critical reception ==
Tor Marin Bøe of Verdens Gang gave the song a positive review, stating:

"The song sounds like a modernized nursery rhyme from the bygone fifties. Think the same marching rhythm as "We walk with peaceful courage", but where you open to throw in a "even if we are pursued by zombies". The feeling of walking through the forest at dusk with Alan Maskefjes chasing after one is compelling. The whole is characterized by too many ideas being thrown out one after the other. Themes that just pass in the dark, never to return again. You don't have such good advice in the barely 160 seconds that "Alone" covers.".

== Alone (Restrung) ==
On 10 February 2017, Alan Walker published an acoustic version of "Alone", called "Alone (Restrung)", exactly one year after he published "Faded (Restrung)". The official lyric video to "Restrung" was released 16 February.

== Track listing ==
Digital download
No.	Title	Length
1.	"Alone"	2:43
2.	"Alone, Pt. II" (f/ Ava Max)	2:59

Digital download
No.	Title	Length
1.	"Alone"	2:43
2.	"Alone" (Instrumental Remix)	2:58
3.	"Alone" (Restrung)	3:05

Digital download – Instrumental Remix
No.	Title	Length
1.	"Alone" (Instrumental Remix)	2:56

Digital download – Remixes
No.	Title	Length
1.	"Alone" (Lost Frequencies Remix)	6:43
2.	"Alone" (Alex Arcoleo Remix)	4:43
3.	"Alone" (George Kwali Remix)	4:59
4.	"Alone" (Jack Wins Remix)	4:16
5.	"Alone" (Blazars Remix)	5:10
6.	"Alone" (Parx Remix)	5:47

== Charts ==
=== Weekly charts ===
Chart (2016–2017)	Peak position
Argentina Anglo Airplay (Monitor Latino)	15
Australia (ARIA)	115
Austria (Ö3 Austria Top 40)	1
Belgium (Ultratop 50 Flanders)	40
Belgium Dance (Ultratop Flanders)	24
Belgium (Ultratop 50 Wallonia)	46
Belgium Dance (Ultratop Wallonia)	2
Czech Republic Airplay (ČNS IFPI)	1
Czech Republic Singles Digital (ČNS IFPI)	12
Denmark (Tracklisten)	40
Finland (Suomen virallinen lista)	1
France (SNEP)	89
Germany (GfK)	4
Germany Dance (Official German Charts)	2
Hungary (Dance Top 40)	6
Hungary (Rádiós Top 40)	8
Hungary (Single Top 40)	6
Ireland (IRMA)	74
Italy (FIMI)	36
Lebanon (Lebanese Top 20)	14
Malaysia (RIM)	13
Mexico Airplay (Billboard)	27
Netherlands (Single Top 100)	53
New Zealand Heatseekers (RMNZ)	9
Norway (VG-lista)	1
Paraguay Airplay (Monitor Latino)	11
Poland Airplay (ZPAV)	2
Portugal (AFP)	66
Russia Airplay (Tophit)	22
Scottish Singles Sales (Official Charts)	83
Slovakia Airplay (ČNS IFPI)	5
Slovakia Singles Digital (ČNS IFPI)	16
Slovenia Airplay (SloTop50)	11
South Korea International (Gaon)	31
Spain (Promusicae)	28
Sweden (Sverigetopplistan)	2
Switzerland (Schweizer Hitparade)	2
Switzerland (Media Control Romandy)	4
US Dance Club Songs (Billboard)	5
US Hot Dance/Electronic Songs (Billboard)	21

=== Year-end charts ===
Chart (2017)	Position
Austria (Ö3 Austria Top 40)	33
Germany (Official German Charts)	62
Hungary (Dance Top 40)	20
Hungary (Rádiós Top 40)	52
Hungary (Single Top 40)	33
Hungary (Stream Top 40)	67
Latvia Airplay (LaIPA)	28
Poland Airplay (ZPAV)	43
Sweden (Sverigetopplistan)	63
Switzerland (Schweizer Hitparade)	8
US Hot Dance/Electronic Songs (Billboard)	61

== Certifications ==
Region	Certification	Certified units/sales
Australia (ARIA)	Gold	35,000^{‡}
Austria (IFPI Austria)	Platinum	30,000^{‡}
Canada (Music Canada)	Gold	40,000^{‡}
Denmark (IFPI Danmark)	Platinum	90,000^{‡}
France (SNEP)	Platinum	200,000^{‡}
Germany (BVMI)	Platinum	400,000^{‡}
Italy (FIMI)	Platinum	50,000^{‡}
Mexico (AMPROFON)	3× Platinum+Gold	210,000^{‡}
New Zealand (RMNZ)	Platinum	30,000^{‡}
Norway (IFPI Norway)	4× Platinum	160,000^{‡}
Poland (ZPAV)	Platinum	50,000^{‡}
Portugal (AFP)	Gold	5,000^{‡}
Spain (Promusicae)	Platinum	60,000^{‡}
Sweden (GLF)	3× Platinum	120,000^{‡}
Switzerland (IFPI Switzerland)	2× Platinum	60,000^{‡}
United Kingdom (BPI)	Gold	400,000^{‡}
United States (RIAA)	Gold	500,000^{‡}
^{‡} Sales+streaming figures based on certification alone.

== Release history ==
Country	Date	Version	Format	Label	Ref.
United States	1 December 2016	Instrumental Remix	Digital download	Mer Musikk	
United States	2 December 2016	Original	Digital download	Mer Musikk	
United States	2 December 2016	Single	Digital download	Mer Musikk	
United States	3 March 2017	Remixes	Digital download	Mer Musikk	
