= The Spectre (song) =

2017 single by Alan Walker

Single by Alan Walker
- Released: 15 September 2017
- Recorded: 2016
- Genre: Electro house
- Length: 3:13
- Label: Mer Musikk
- Composers: Alan Walker; Marcus Arnbekk; Anders Frøen; Lars Kristian Rosness; Jesper Borgen
- Lyricists: Anders Frøen; Alan Walker; Jesper Borgen; Tommy Laverdi; Gunnar Greve; Lars Kristian Rosness; Marcus Arnbekk
- Producers: Mood Melodies; Marcus Arnbekk; Lars Kristian Rosness; Alan Walker

Alan Walker singles chronology
"Tired" (2017)	"The Spectre" (2017)	"All Falls Down" (2017)

Audio sample
- "The Spectre": file; help

Music video
- "The Spectre" on YouTube

"The Spectre" is a song by Norwegian DJ and record producer Alan Walker incorporating uncredited vocals provided by Norwegian songwriter and record producer Jesper Borgen. It was composed by Jesper Borgen, Alan Walker, Marcus Arnbekk, Mood Melodies and Lars Kristian Rosness, with production handled by the latter four, and lyrics written by all composers as well as Tommy La Verdi and Gunnar Greve. "The Spectre" has a tempo of 128 BPM, is in the key of C♯ minor, and lasts for 3 minutes and 13 seconds. The song was released via Mer Musikk on 15 September 2017.

== Background ==
"The Spectre" is a vocal remake of Walker's 2015 single "Spectre", which was released through NoCopyrightSounds on 6 January 2015. On 22 December 2016, Walker debuted the song during the live show "Alan Walker is Heading Home", in his hometown Bergen, Norway. He has included the song in his live sets months ahead of the song's release, as well as playing a revised version of the song on the main stage at Tomorrowland Belgium 2017. In an interview with Dance Music Northwest, Walker described the song as "a newer version of my old song Spectre", similar to "what I did with 'Fade' to 'Faded'". Walker said of the song in a press release: "The reactions and feedback from people have been truly amazing, I'm very excited that's it's now being released officially. It's a song that I specifically want to dedicate to my core fans who've been following me since the start."

== Critical reception ==
Your EDM felt the song "contains all of the common Alan Walker elements that international EDM fans have come to find and love", including "the sound design, faint dreamy vocals, the anthemic drop, and the patented Alan Walker lead". Comparing to "Faded", they deemed it "a sleeker, more refined record". In 2022, the official music video accomplished 1 billion streams on YouTube, making it Walker's 3rd single to accomplish this milestone.

== Resurface ==
In September 2023, the song regained popularity due to a viral meme posted on media-sharing platforms, featuring what a Smurf Cat would supposedly look like, typically alongside the lyrics "We live, we love, we lie" of Walker's song.

== Credits and personnel ==
Credits adapted from Tidal.

- Alan Walker – songwriting, production
- Marcus Arnbekk – songwriting, production
- Mood Melodies – songwriting, production
- Lars Kristian Rosness – songwriting, production
- Jesper Borgen – songwriting, vocals
- Tommy La Verdi – lyrics
- Gunnar Greve – lyrics, executive production
- Sören von Malmborg – mastering engineering
- Fredrik Borch Olsen – co-production

== Charts ==
=== Weekly charts ===
Weekly chart performance for "The Spectre"
Chart (2017–18)	Peak position
Austria (Ö3 Austria Top 40)	14
Czech Republic Airplay (ČNS IFPI)	30
Czech Republic Singles Digital (ČNS IFPI)	57
Finland (Suomen virallinen latauslista)	9
Germany (GfK)	50
Hungary (Single Top 40)	32
Italy (Musica e Dischi)	25
Mexico Airplay (Billboard)	31
Norway (VG-lista)	5
Philippines (Philippine Hot 100)	65
Poland Airplay (ZPAV)	7
Slovakia Airplay (ČNS IFPI)	76
Slovakia Singles Digital (ČNS IFPI)	97
Sweden (Sverigetopplistan)	22
Switzerland (Schweizer Hitparade)	13
Switzerland (Media Control Romandy)	8
US Hot Dance/Electronic Songs (Billboard)	24

=== Year-end charts ===
Year-end chart performance for "The Spectre"
Chart (2018)	Position
US Hot Dance/Electronic Songs (Billboard)	83

== Certifications ==
Certifications and sales for "The Spectre"
Region	Certification	Certified units/sales
Austria (IFPI Austria)	Platinum	30,000^{‡}
Denmark (IFPI Danmark)	Gold	45,000^{‡}
France (SNEP)	Gold	100,000^{‡}
Germany (BVMI)	Gold	200,000^{‡}
Italy (FIMI)	Gold	25,000^{‡}
Mexico (AMPROFON)	Platinum	60,000^{‡}
New Zealand (RMNZ)	Gold	15,000^{‡}
Poland (ZPAV)	Platinum	50,000^{‡}
Spain (Promusicae)	Gold	30,000^{‡}
Sweden (GLF)	Platinum	40,000^{‡}
United Kingdom (BPI)	Silver	200,000^{‡}
^{‡} Sales+streaming figures based on certification alone.
