= Different World (Alan Walker song) =

Single by Alan Walker featuring K-391, Sofia Carson and Corsak

from the album Different World
- Released: 30 November 2018
- Length: 3:22
- Label: MER (Sony)
- Songwriters: Alan Walker; Fredrik Borch Olsen; James David Njie Eriksen; Markus Arnbekk; Gunnar Greve Pettersen; Kenneth "K-391" Nilsen; Mengzhou Hu; Sara Hjellstrom; Magnus Bertelsen
- Producers: Walker; Big Fred; James Njie; Kenneth "K-391" Nilsen; Mengzhou Hu

Alan Walker singles chronology
"Diamond Heart" (2018)	"Different World" (2018)	"Are You Lonely" (2019)

K-391 singles chronology
"Mystery" (2018)	"Different World" (2018)	"Play" (2019)

Sofia Carson singles chronology
"Rumors" (2018)	"Different World" (2018)	"San Francisco" (2018)

Corsak singles chronology
"Reverse (Live)" (2018)	"Different World" (2018)	"Glow" (2019)

Music video
- "Different World" on YouTube

"Different World" is a song by the Norwegian DJ and producer Alan Walker featuring Norwegian DJ K-391, American singer Sofia Carson and Chinese DJ Corsak. It was released on 30 November 2018 as the fourth and final single from Walker's debut studio album of the same name. The song is a re-worked version of a track originally known as "Sevje" by K-391.

== Background ==
The song was written by Swedish Grammis-nominated songwriter Shy Martin, among others including Fredrik Borch Olse, Gunnar Greve, Magnus Bertelsen, James Daniel Njie Eriksen, Kenneth Nilsen, Marcus Arnbekk and Mengzhou Hu. It was released alongside an accompanying campaign titled "#CreateADifferentWorld", in which Walker addresses the importance of climate change. He said "I want to use my voice to raise awareness. And that's what this song is about. There is still time, together we can create a different world."

== Videos ==
=== Lyric video ===
The lyric video for the song was released on the same day as the song's release, on 30 November 2018. It was directed and edited by Alexander Zarate Frez. Simon Compagnet had produced the graphics for the video while additional footage was provided by Bradley Wickham and Bror Bror. (Note: Credits for the music video are adapted from its description on YouTube.)

For most of the video, images were depicted of oceans filled with trash, air pollution, wildfires, hurricanes, and other kinds of disaster scenarios linked to climate change. For the third quarter of the video, the song takes a more wishful tone and the visuals change to vistas of nature, aiming to show what could be if people worked together to combat climate change.

=== Vertical video ===
An alternative music video was released on 13 December 2018, produced in a vertical format and meant to be viewed on a smartphone in portrait orientation. It was also directed by Alexander Zarate Frez, with Larry Reibman as director of photography. Marie Hjelmerud produced the motion graphics, along with Fredrik Winge as second editor. It also features Sofia Carson inside one of the messages as she sings.

The video was social media-oriented, using platforms like Facebook, Twitter, Instagram and Snapchat as its medium. An excerpt from a speech at the 1992 Rio Summit by Severn Cullis-Suzuki was played near the two-minute mark.

== Reception and legacy ==
Billboard noted the song as "depicting the sad state of our planet with hard-to-watch images of polluted oceans, forest fires and communities under water," along with suggesting the lack of awareness or pretence regarding the issue of climate change by people in power.

Alan Walker later donated $100,001USD to #TeamTrees, a joint fundraiser by MrBeast and Mark Rober. It was combined with the message, "I want to plant a tree!"

== Charts ==
Chart (2018–19)	Peak position
Czech Republic Airplay (ČNS IFPI)	17
Finland (Suomen virallinen lista)	14
Norway (VG-lista)	31
Sweden Heatseeker (Sverigetopplistan)	5
Switzerland (Schweizer Hitparade)	73
US Hot Dance/Electronic Songs (Billboard)	32
