= Lost Control (Alan Walker song) =

2018 song by Alan Walker and Sorana

Song by Alan Walker and Sorana

from the album Different World
- Released: 14 December 2018
- Genre: Dance
- Length: 3:42
- Label: MER Musikk
- Songwriters: Alan Walker; Thomas Troelsen; Mood Melodies; Sorana; Big Fred; Magnify
- Producers: Mood Melodies; Alan Walker

Audio
- "Lost Control" on YouTube

"Lost Control" is a song by British-Norwegian record producer and DJ Alan Walker and Romanian singer and songwriter Sorana, from Walker's first studio album, Different World.

== Background ==
Of the song, Walker said, "This song is based on an idea I had about a year ago. The theme and lyrics of the song are something I think many people can relate to. As for the vocals, Sorana is a talented singer/songwriter and originally co-wrote this song as well. I feel her vocals are something special that makes this song stand out."

== Critical reception ==
Lewis Partington of We Rave You stated, "Lost Control was born from an idea a year ago, and the inclusion of Solana's vocals made it incredible.

== Track listing ==
Digital download
No.	Title	Length
1.	"Lost Control"	3:42

== Charts ==
=== Weekly charts ===
Chart (2018)	Peak position
Belgium (Ultratip)	16
Netherlands (Single Tip)	17
Norway (VG-lista)	3
Sweden Heatseekers (Sverigetopplistan)	1
Switzerland (Schweizer Hitparade)	21
Turkey (Turkish Singles Chart)	4
US Hot Dance/Electronic Songs (Billboard)	28

=== Year-end charts ===
Chart (2019)	Peak position
Norway (VG-lista)	37
