= All Falls Down (Alan Walker song) =

Single by Alan Walker, Noah Cyrus and Digital Farm Animals, featuring Juliander

from the album Different World
- Released: 27 October 2017
- Genre: Electropop
- Length: 3:19
- Label: Mer Musikk; Ultra
- Songwriters: Alan Walker; Anders Frøen; Richard Boardman; Pablo Bowman; Daniel Boyle; Sarah Blanchard; Nicholas Gale
- Producers: Walker; Nicholas Gale; Mood Melodies; The Six; Gunnar Greve (co.); Chris "TEK" O'Ryan (co.); Jenna Andrews (voc.); Alex Holmberg (voc.)

Alan Walker singles chronology
"The Spectre" (2017)	"All Falls Down" (2017)	"Ignite" (2018)

Noah Cyrus singles chronology
"Again" (2017)	"All Falls Down" (2017)	"Slow" (2017)

Digital Farm Animals singles chronology
"Arms Around Me" (2017)	"All Falls Down" (2017)	"Say My Name" (2018)

Music video
- "All Falls Down" on YouTube

"All Falls Down" is a song by Norwegian DJ and record producer Alan Walker, British DJ and producer Digital Farm Animals, and American singer Noah Cyrus featuring Swedish singer Juliander. It was composed by Digital Farm Animals, Pablo Bowman, Sarah Blanchard and its producers Walker, Mood Melodies, Digital Farm Animals, and the Six, with lyrics written by the Six, Bowman, Blanchard, and Daniel Boyle. Mer Musikk and Ultra Music released it on 27 October 2017 as the lead single from Walker's debut album, Different World (2018). The song received mixed reviews from critics, who praised Cyrus's vocals but deemed the song inferior to Walker's previous songs.

== Background ==
On 23 October 2017, Walker released a trailer for the single. Described as "an action-packed adventure of epic proportion" and "a real roller coaster affair" by critics, it features a variety of subplots, including romance, kidnapping, cult-like burials, "an Alan Walker-branded time capsule and explosions", as well as "flaming torches, desert landscapes, welded metal and a digital timer". On 25 October 2017, Walker revealed features on the song via social media.

Walker offered in a press release: "With this record I got the opportunity to collaborate with some amazing artists. Noah Cyrus' voice is absolutely incredible! Ever since I first heard the topline, I've been in love with it and can't wait for my fans to hear it as well. It has a refreshing production that still fits well within my signature sound, which is important for me to maintain as I evolve as an artist." Cyrus added: "I've loved this record since the moment I heard it. It's amazing to be a part of this song with such a badass dude and it's really incredible to be a part of this project."

== Critical reception ==
Kat Bein of Billboard wrote: "The track kicks off with glimmering acoustic strums and finger-snaps, all leading up to a bouncy, anthemic drop." Matthew Meadow of Your EDM felt "the drop is still characteristically Walker", and appreciates that "the influence from [Digital Farm Animals] is noticeable". Kevin Apaza of Direct Lyrics praised Walker for "gives listeners a counterbalance in the form of an uplifting electro pop beat and drops" despite the "rather sad" lyrics. Erik of EDM Sauce wrote a mixed review of the song, saying that the song has "a more laid back almost tropical feeling", which he opined as "something like Kygo might release". He also praised Cyrus for "providing gorgeous vocals throughout". He concluded by deeming the song "a lesser known, forgettable release" from Walker. Olav Haraldsen Roen of NRK P3 said, "The verses are dry and raw, and the chorus, despite Walker's signature pulsating synths and a simple melody line, is quite characterless."

== Music video ==
The music video, released alongside the single, joins a post-apocalyptic trilogy which began with the visual for Walker's previous single "Tired". It continues where the previous video left off, taking place eighty-three years after a solar storm destroyed all technology on Earth in 2017.

The music video was shot in Bosnia and Herzegovina, Croatia, and Montenegro. Some of the filming took place at the Kupari Tourist Complex, a ruined resort in Župa Dubrovačka, Croatia.

== Live performances ==
Walker and Noah Cyrus performing on The Tonight Show Starring Jimmy Fallon

In December 2017, Walker performed "All Falls Down" with Noah Cyrus and Juliander at YouTube Space NY to celebrate Walker's YouTube channel reaching 10 million subscribers. On January 11, 2018, Walker appeared with Cyrus on The Tonight Show Starring Jimmy Fallon, where she performed "All Falls Down" with their band. Walker told Nordic music magazine Gaffa: "I'm really looking forward to performing on "The Tonight Show" with Noah Cyrus! I've seen the program and many performances before, and it's great to be on the same stage myself. I hope people back home in Norway check it out on TV and online, and that they like what they see".

== Track listing ==
Digital download
No.	Title	Length
1.	"All Falls Down" (with Noah Cyrus and Digital Farm Animals)	3:19

Digital download – Remixes
No.	Title	Length
1.	"All Falls Down" (Steve Aoki Remix)	3:45
2.	"All Falls Down" (Mio Remix)	3:15
3.	"All Falls Down" (Todd Edwards Remix)	3:04
4.	"All Falls Down" (K-391 Remix)	3:26
5.	"All Falls Down" (Jay Pryor Remix)	2:47
6.	"All Falls Down" (Mark Villa Remix)	2:37

== Credits and personnel ==
Credits adapted from Tidal.

- Alan Walker – composition, production, engineering, programming
- Noah Cyrus – vocals
- Digital Farm Animals – composition, production, programming
- Sarah Blanchard – composition, lyrics
- The Six – composition, lyrics, production
- Pablo Bowman – composition, lyrics, guitar
- Mood Melodies – composition, production, engineering, vocals, guitar, programming, recording engineering, vocal production
- Daniel Boyle – lyrics, vocal production
- Sören von Malmborg – mixing engineering, mastering engineering
- Chris O'Ryan – engineering, vocals, vocal production, co-production
- Carl Hovind – engineering, programming
- Juliander – vocals
- Ashleigh Scotcher – background vocals
- Gunnar Greve – executive production
- Kristian Kvalvaag – guitar
- Tommy Kristiansen – guitar
- Keith Parry – recording engineering
- Jenna Andrews – vocal production
- Alex Holmberg – vocal production

== Charts ==
=== Weekly charts ===
Chart (2017–2018)	Peak position
Australia (ARIA)	95
Australia Dance (ARIA)	19
Austria (Ö3 Austria Top 40)	29
Belgium (Ultratop 50 Flanders)	47
Belgium Dance (Ultratop Flanders)	14
Belgium (Ultratop 50 Wallonia)	44
Belgium Dance (Ultratop Wallonia)	2
Colombia (National-Report)	44
Czech Republic Airplay (ČNS IFPI)	8
Czech Republic Singles Digital (ČNS IFPI)	41
Finland (Suomen virallinen lista)	10
France (SNEP)	139
Germany (GfK)	75
Hungary (Dance Top 40)	10
Hungary (Rádiós Top 40)	19
Hungary (Single Top 40)	27
Hungary (Stream Top 40)	36
Ireland (IRMA)	65
Latvia (DigiTop100)	47
Malaysia (RIM)	10
Netherlands (Dutch Top 40)	12
Netherlands (Mega Top 50)	44
Netherlands (Single Top 100)	20
Netherlands (Dutch Dance Top 30)	3
New Zealand Heatseeker (RMNZ)	6
Norway (VG-lista)	1
Poland Airplay (ZPAV)	5
Singapore (RIAS)	6
Slovakia Airplay (ČNS IFPI)	26
Slovakia Singles Digital (ČNS IFPI)	53
Slovenia (SloTop50)	33
South Korea International (Gaon)	10
Spain (PROMUSICAE)	62
Sweden (Sverigetopplistan)	4
Switzerland (Schweizer Hitparade)	29
UK Singles (OCC)	87
UK Dance (OCC)	15
US Dance Club Songs (Billboard)	1
US Hot Dance/Electronic Songs (Billboard)	11

=== Year-end charts ===
Chart (2018)	Position
Estonia (Eesti Tipp-40)	99
Hungary (Dance Top 40)	62
Hungary (Rádiós Top 40)	94
Netherlands (Dutch Top 40)	67
Poland (ZPAV)	33
Sweden (Sverigetopplistan)	50
US Dance Club Songs (Billboard)	2
US Hot Dance/Electronic Songs (Billboard)	41

Chart (2019)	Position
Hungary (Dance Top 40)	73

== Certifications ==
Region	Certification	Certified units/sales
Australia (ARIA)	Gold	35,000^{‡}
Austria (IFPI Austria)	Gold	15,000^{‡}
Canada (Music Canada)	Platinum	80,000^{‡}
Denmark (IFPI Danmark)	Gold	45,000^{‡}
France (SNEP)	Gold	100,000^{‡}
Germany (BVMI)	Gold	200,000^{‡}
Italy (FIMI)	Gold	25,000^{‡}
Mexico (AMPROFON)	Platinum	60,000^{‡}
Netherlands (NVPI)	Platinum	40,000^{‡}
New Zealand (RMNZ)	Gold	15,000^{‡}
Poland (ZPAV)	2× Platinum	40,000^{‡}
Spain (Promusicae)	Platinum	60,000^{‡}
Switzerland (IFPI Switzerland)	Platinum	20,000^{‡}
United Kingdom (BPI)	Silver	200,000^{‡}
United States (RIAA)	Gold	500,000^{‡}
Streaming
Sweden (GLF)	3× Platinum	24,000,000^{†}
^{‡} Sales+streaming figures based on certification alone.^{†} Streaming-only figures based on certification alone.

== Release history ==
Region	Date	Format	Version	Label	Ref.
Various	27 October 2017	Digital download; streaming	Original	Mer Musikk; Ultra	
United States	1 December 2017	Digital download; streaming	Remixes	Mer Misikk	
United States	5 December 2017	Contemporary hit radio	Original	RCA	
