= Faded (Alan Walker song) =

2015 single by Alan Walker

Single by Alan Walker
- Released: 3 December 2015
- Genre: Electro house; progressive house; melodic house
- Length: 3:32
- Label: MER Musikk
- Songwriters: Alan Walker; Jesper Borgen; Anders Frøen; Gunnar Greve
- Producers: Alan Walker; Jesper Borgen; Mood Melodies

Alan Walker singles chronology
| "Force" (2015) | "Faded" (2015) | "Sing Me to Sleep" (2016) |

Music video
- "Faded" on YouTube

"Faded" is a song by Norwegian DJ and record producer Alan Walker with vocals by Norwegian singer-songwriter Iselin Solheim. A rework of Walker's earlier song "Fade", the song was written by Walker, Jesper Borgen, Mood Melodies, and Gunnar Greve and produced by the former three. It was released as a single by MER on 3 December 2015, for digital download and streaming.

The song has been described as electro house, progressive house, and melodic house and was praised by critics for its melancholic melody, synthesizers, and vocals. Lyrically, the song expresses a sense of longing and a search for something meaningful. It was also a commercial success, topping Norway's VG-lista chart for 14 weeks and becoming Walker's first number-one single. In Germany, it reached number one on the GfK Entertainment charts for ten weeks. It also reached number one on the Shazam Worldwide Top 100 Popular Songs in February 2016 and, by March 2016, had become the world's most Shazamed song. "Faded" reached number 80 on the Billboard Hot 100 and was the 16th Norwegian song to chart there. It topped the charts in 18 countries and also topped the year-end charts in Austria, Germany, Switzerland, and Sweden.

The accompanying music video was released the day after the single and was directed by Rikkard and Tobias Häggbom, with filming taking place in Estonia. It reached one billion views on YouTube on 26 March 2017, becoming the first Norwegian song to achieve this milestone. It also became the first electronic dance music (EDM) song to surpass three billion views on YouTube. As of July 2026, it has been viewed over 4 billion times, making it the 33rd most-viewed YouTube video.

The song won The Cannes Lions Award at the Cannes Lions International Festival of Creativity, the Årets Låt (Song of the Year) award at Spellenmannprisen '16, and the Best International Hit award at the Swiss Music Awards, and was nominated for British Single of the Year at the Brit Awards 2017 and Song of the Year at the Echo Music Prize. Walker debuted a live performance of "Faded" with Solheim and string support on 27 February 2016, at the X Games Norway in Oslo, which was broadcast live on Norwegian television and Amercian broadcast network ESPN. It was included as the ultimate track on Walker's debut album Different World (2018) after an interlude specific to the track.

== Background and release ==
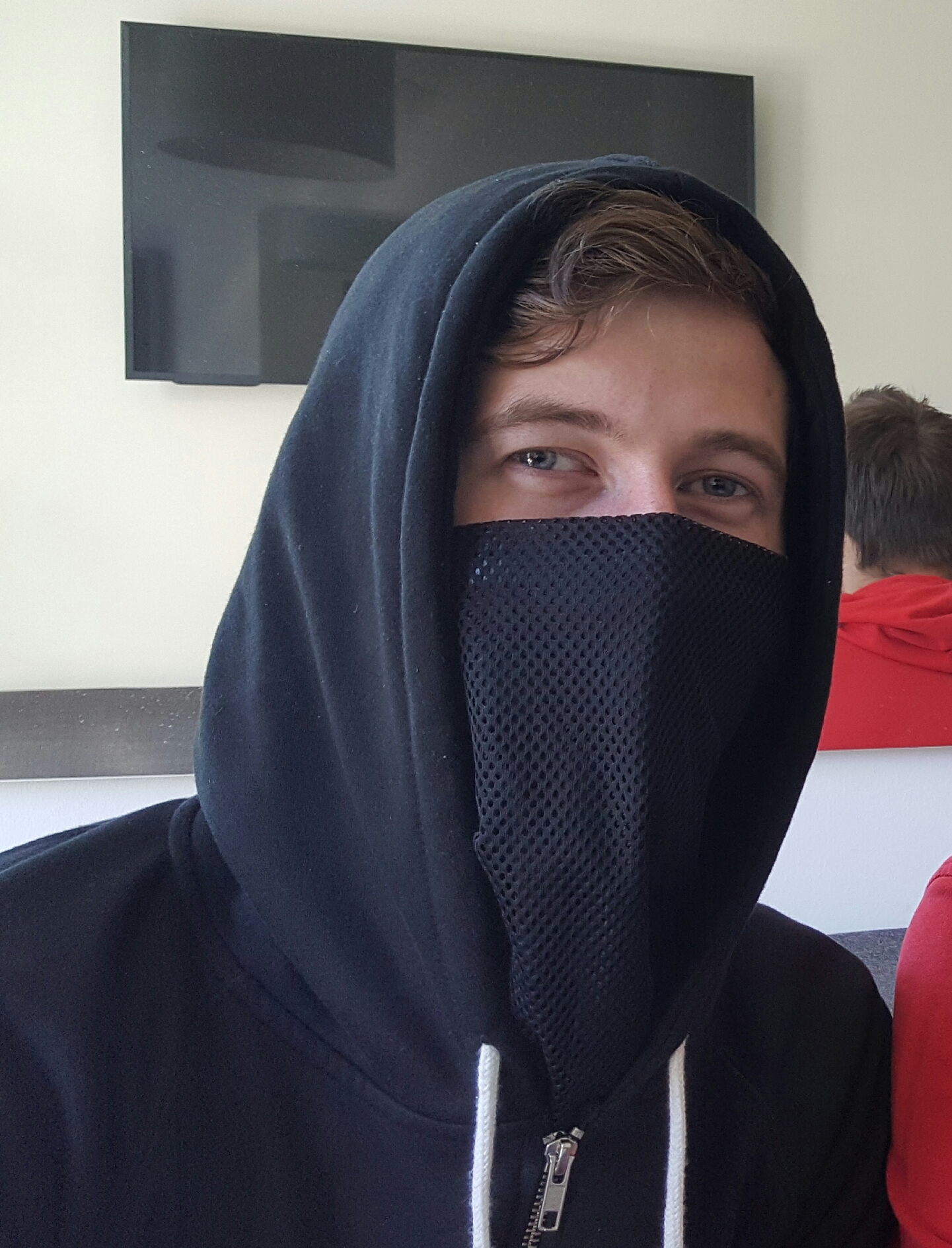
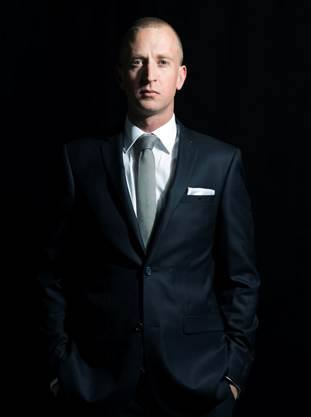
Walker (left) was discovered by Gunnar Greve (right) on YouTube in 2015, which led to a contract with MER Musikk.

"Faded" is a remake of Walker's earlier song "Fade", which was released by the British record label NoCopyrightSounds (NCS) in 2014. When "Fade" started gaining attention in 2014, Walker received feedback from listeners on how the song felt like it should have lyrics, which it lacked. Walker felt the song had the potential to be expanded, such as by adding vocals, but was not ready to do it yet. "Fade" had already racked up over 40 million views on YouTube and over 15 million streams on Spotify before the release of "Faded". He followed with the release of "Spectre" and "Force", which attracted the attention of major record labels.

On 24 August 2015 (Walker's 18th birthday), he signed with MER Musikk, signing the contract at his home with Gunnar Greve. After that, he began working on a new version of "Fade" with his new songwriting team: Anders Frøen, Jesper Borgen, and Greve. The team wrote the song's topline and lyrics, rebuilt the track, and added piano. Walker was also searching for the right vocalist to remake "Fade", and when he met fellow Norwegian singer Iselin Solheim through Borgen, Walker felt she was the perfect fit for the song. It was subsequently released for digital download and streaming on 3 December 2015. Three years after its release, it was included as the final track on Walker's debut album Different World (2018) after an interlude specific to the track.

== Lyrics and composition ==
"Faded"
A 23-second song sample. The song has been described as electro house, progressive house, and melodic house. It features a melancholic and emotional melody and a tempo of 90 bpm, leading it to be categorized as a "downtempo" track.

The lyrics for "Faded" were written by Walker, Jesper Borgen, Anders Frøen, and Gunnar Greve. Also participating were Ingrid Helgor Skretting as vocalist and Sören Von Malmborg as mastering and mixing engineer. In addition to the lyrics, the track was fully rebuilt with a new mix and mastering, and a piano was introduced. Walker said that by adding lyrics and piano, "the whole song just came together". In the acoustic version, only the piano, violin, and Solheim's vocals are heard. Lyrically, the song expresses a sense of longing and a search for something meaningful. Its protagonist feels like she is fading away, both physically and emotionally, and struggles to find her way back to a place of belonging and purpose.

In a Genius attribution, Walker said of the lyrics:

I would describe "Faded" as a happy yet emotional song, appropriate for both sad and/or uplifting occasions. It's about searching for someone, something or somewhere lost. Or just feeling lost! One of the things I like the most about its lyrics is that the meaning can be interpreted freely by the listener.

The song has been described as electro house, progressive house, and melodic house. It has also been described as melodic and melancholic. It is written in the E♭ minor key, with a tempo of 90 beats per minute and a chord progression of E♭m–C♭–G♭–D♭. Due to its slow tempo, the song is often categorized as "downtempo". Walker said this in an interview with Norwegian state-owned public broadcaster NRK: "This is not what's popular these days. 'Fade' and 'Faded' are different from other songs in tempo". In a 2017 interview with the British newspaper The Standard, he said, "It's kind of like a movie soundtrack because it won't distract you and you can have it on if you're working out or playing video games".

== Critical reception ==
"Faded" was met with positive reviews from music critics. Julia Friese of Die Welt called it "universal emotional pop" and "ideal background music", while Aundun Vinger of Dagens Næringsliv described it as a "definitive masterpiece". Vinger and German radio station 1LIVE's Anke van de Weyer highlighted Solheim's "ethereal" vocals for adding "depth" and "emotional weight", which Austrian news portal Vorarlberg Online noted fit the concept "perfectly". Music critics also focused on the atmospheric composition, with Bradley Stern of PopCrush praising its "lonesome trance pulsations" and "ghostly cries", and Simon Kress of German music website Dance-Charts noting the shift from piano to synth sections. Kress and Vorarlberg Online commended the balance between the soulful melody and a "powerful dance beat". Further praise came from Emily Blake of Mashable, who labeled it a "dizzying, beautifully lonesome EDM track", while S. B. Vijaya Mary of The Hindu praised the song, saying that its "uniquely melancholic mood" "connected with EDM audiences".

The song has been ranked on several lists. Tatiana Cirisano of Billboard ranked it as Walker's best song, stating that "It's not hard to understand why the winding beat and triumphant synth progression of 'Faded' captivated dance listeners around the globe". Vice ranked "Faded" number 93 on its list of "The 101 Best EDM Songs of All Time", writing that the song "feels shockingly singular amid the trap arms race" and "weightless", with drifting piano parts and Fourth World–style synth percussion reminiscent of Enigma. Spin ranked the song number 10 on "The 50 Best EDM Songs You've Heard at Every Summer Festival", praising its mournful piano intro, shimmering synths, and Solheim's emotive vocals and noting its appeal in both intimate and festival settings. Additionally, American media platform Dancing Astronaut ranked the song 78th in their "Top 100 Songs of the Decade", while Norwegian online newspaper Nettavisen ranked the song 19th in their list "The 100 Best Norwegian Hit Songs Ever".

== Commercial performance ==
=== Global ===
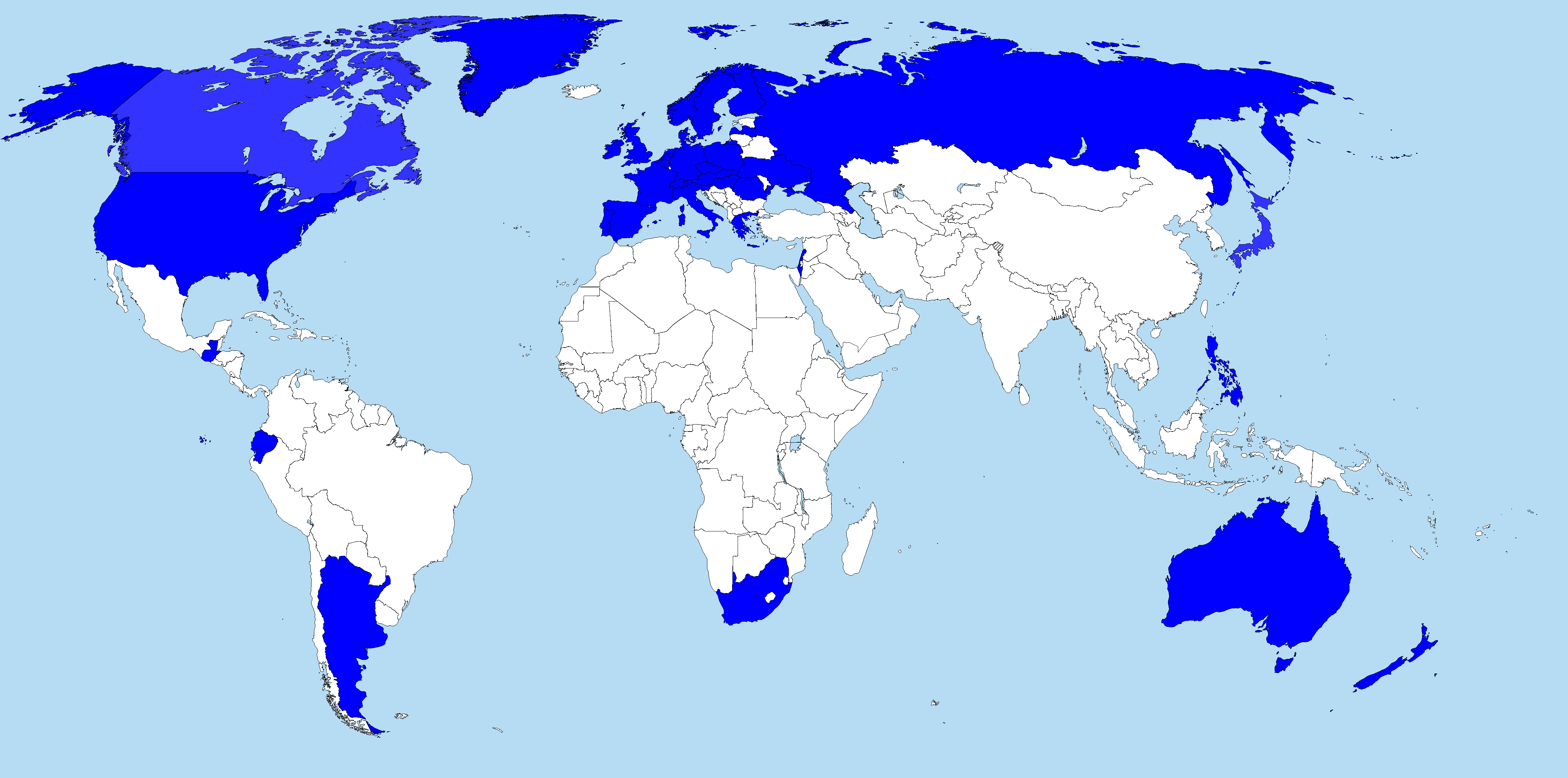
Chart peak positions (Note: The United States is highlighted for its position on the Billboard Hot Dance/Electronic Songs chart, and Greece is highlighted for its position on the Billboard Greece Digital Songs chart.) 1 - 20 21 - 40 41 - 60 61 - 80 81 - 100

"Faded" was an immediate commercial success worldwide, reaching number one on the charts in 18 countries and reaching the top five in over 25 countries. The song reached number one on Shazam's Worldwide Top 100 Popular Songs in February 2016, where it remained at number one for seven weeks, and it was the most Shazamed song worldwide by March 2016. The song was also Shazamed 6 million times in the first three months of 2016, making it the third most Shazamed song of the year.

The song reached number one on the Spotify Global Viral Chart and number five on the Global Top 50. It also reached 500 million streams on Spotify in December 2016 and 1 billion streams in April 2019, making it the first Norwegian song to reach both milestones and the first song from outside the UK or US to reach over 1 billion streams. As of July 2016, the single had been downloaded 4 million times. Four years after its release, the song became the most-streamed song on Apple Music in Venezuela during the week of 4 November 2019. It also debuted on the Billboard Global Excl. US chart on 19 September 2020 and peaked at number 147 on the chart on 21 November 2020. As of December 2025, this song has been streamed over 25 billion times worldwide.

=== North America ===
In the United States, "Faded" debuted at number 91 on the Billboard Hot 100 chart dated 30 April 2016. This was Walker's first appearance on the Billboard Hot 100, and it became the 16th Norwegian song to chart there. After that, the song moved in and out of the lower reaches of the chart but rose from number 97 to number 80 on the chart dated 11 June 2016. It also ranked number four on the Dance Club Songs chart and number seven on the Hot Dance/Electronic Songs chart.

In July 2016, Billboard reported that "Faded" was the tenth best-selling EDM song in the United States, with 186,000 copies sold, and the tenth most-streamed on-demand EDM song across audio and video platforms, with 77.1 million streams. In July 2017, it was the ninth most-watched EDM song on video on demand, with 64.0 million views. By July 2018, it had risen to seventh place in on-demand audio and video streams, totaling 121.2 million streams. In July 2019, it was ranked as the third most-streamed EDM song on-demand, with 192.4 million streams. The Recording Industry Association of America (RIAA) certified the single as triple platinum for sales of over 3 million units and track-equivalent streams. In Canada, the song reached number 32 on the Canadian Hot 100 chart dated 18 June 2016 and remained on the chart for 31 weeks. Music Canada (MC) certified the single 8× Platinum for sales of 640,000 units and track-equivalent streams.

=== Europe ===
In the United Kingdom, the song debuted at number 91 on the UK Singles Chart on 11 February 2016. On the chart dated 1 April 2016, the song rose seven places to number 11, up from number 18 the previous week, and reached number one on the Official Trending Chart that week. The following week, on the chart dated 8 April, it rose four places to number 7. The song stayed on the charts for 42 weeks. It also debuted at number 39 on the UK Dance Chart on 15 January 2016 and peaked at number two on the chart dated 29 April 2016. In 2019, the Official Charts Company released its The Top 40 one-hit wonders of the decade chart, a chart of the biggest single hits by artists who only had one Top 40 hit in the 2010s, with "Faded" ranking at number 13. Also, in 2022, to mark the 70th anniversary of the UK Singles Chart, it released the UK's Most-Streamed songs of all time chart, with the song coming in at number 147. The British Phonographic Industry (BPI) certified the single triple platinum for sales of over 1.8 million units and track-equivalent streams. According to Wired UK, it has sold 54,000 digital copies in the UK by September 2016.

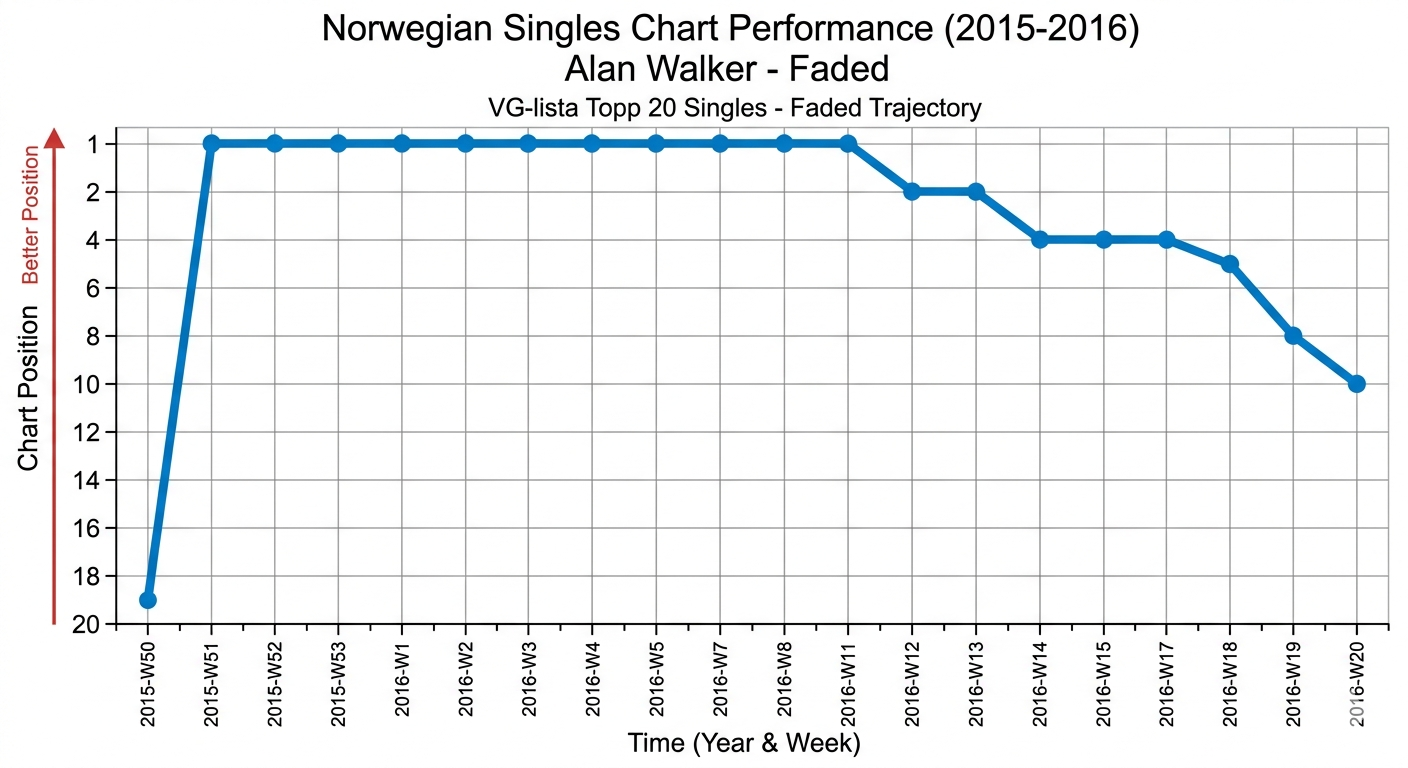
Chart performance of "Faded" in Norway.

In Walker's native Norway, the song reached number 19 within a week of its release in 2015 and rose to number one a week later on the chart dated 20 December 2015. It remained at the top of the charts for 14 weeks before being stopped from reaching the top of the charts for 15 weeks by Norwegian music producer Kygo and British singer Labrinth's single "Fragile". On Spotify, the song reached number 25 on the Norwegian Spotify chart four days after its release and topped the chart on 14 December with 153,000 streams in a single day. As of 20 July 2016, the song had been streamed 431.7 million times on Spotify, surpassing Kygo's "Firestone" featuring Conrad Sewell which had 431.1 million streams, making it the most-streamed Norwegian song. (Note: Except for Seeb's remix of Mike Posner's "I Took a Pill in Ibiza".) It was also Norway's most-streamed song on Spotify in 2016.

In Germany, the song debuted at number 69 on the Top 100 Singles chart dated 15 January 2016. It entered the top 10 three weeks later and reached number one the following week on the chart dated 12 February 2016. This makes him the fourth Norwegian artist to achieve this feat, following Wenche Myhre, A-ha, and Marit Larsen. It remained at the top of the chart for the next ten weeks. It later dropped to number two on the chart dated 22 April 2016. It topped the Top 20 Dance chart for 13 weeks and the airplay chart for 2 weeks. It reached number one on the 2016 year-end chart. The song was streamed 3.69 million times in one week, setting a new streaming record in Germany, beating English singer Adele's song "Hello" with 3.5 million streams. The Bundesverband Musikindustrie (BVMI) certified the single 7× Gold for sales of 1.4 million units and track-equivalent streams.

"Faded" topped the charts in several European countries, including Austria, Belgium, the Czech Republic, Finland, France, Hungary, Italy, Latvia, Poland, Russia, Slovakia, Spain, Sweden, and Switzerland. It also reached number one on the year-end charts in Austria, Switzerland, and Sweden and charted in Austria, Germany, the Netherlands, Russia, and Ukraine on the decade-end charts.

== Music video ==
=== Production ===
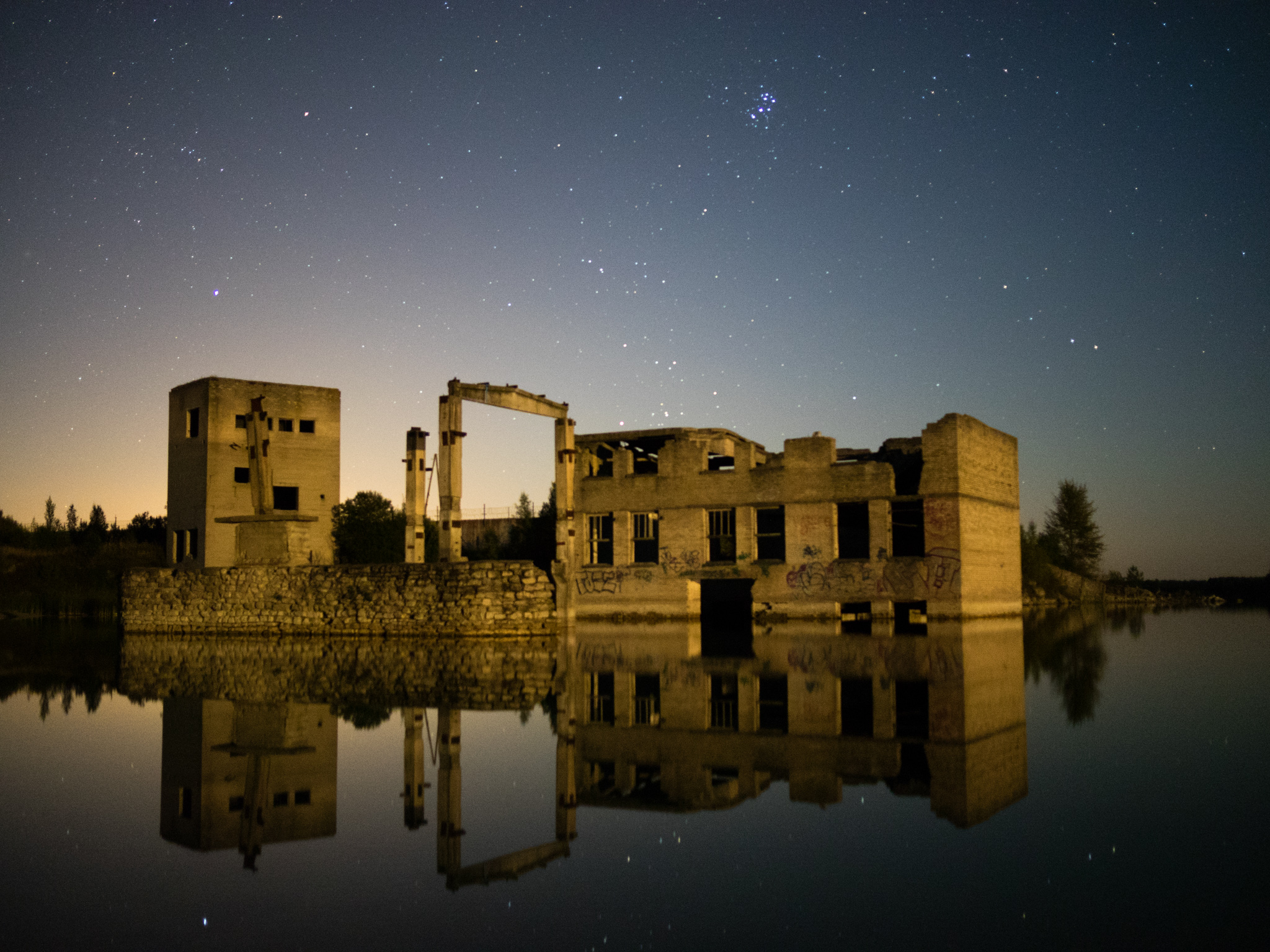
Derelict Rummu quarry utility buildings in the water at night, September 2014

The music video for "Faded" features Swedish actor Shahab Salehi. It was produced and edited by the Swedish production company Bror Bror and directed by Rikkard and Tobias Häggbom; Rikkard Häggbom served as director of photography. The music video was filmed in Estonia at locations such as the Linnahall building; a disused textile manufacturing plant and a concert hall in Tallinn; the former Rummu prison; the Rummu quarry and lake alongside the adjoining spoil tip in Vasalemma Parish; and the city of Paldiski.

=== Synopsis ===
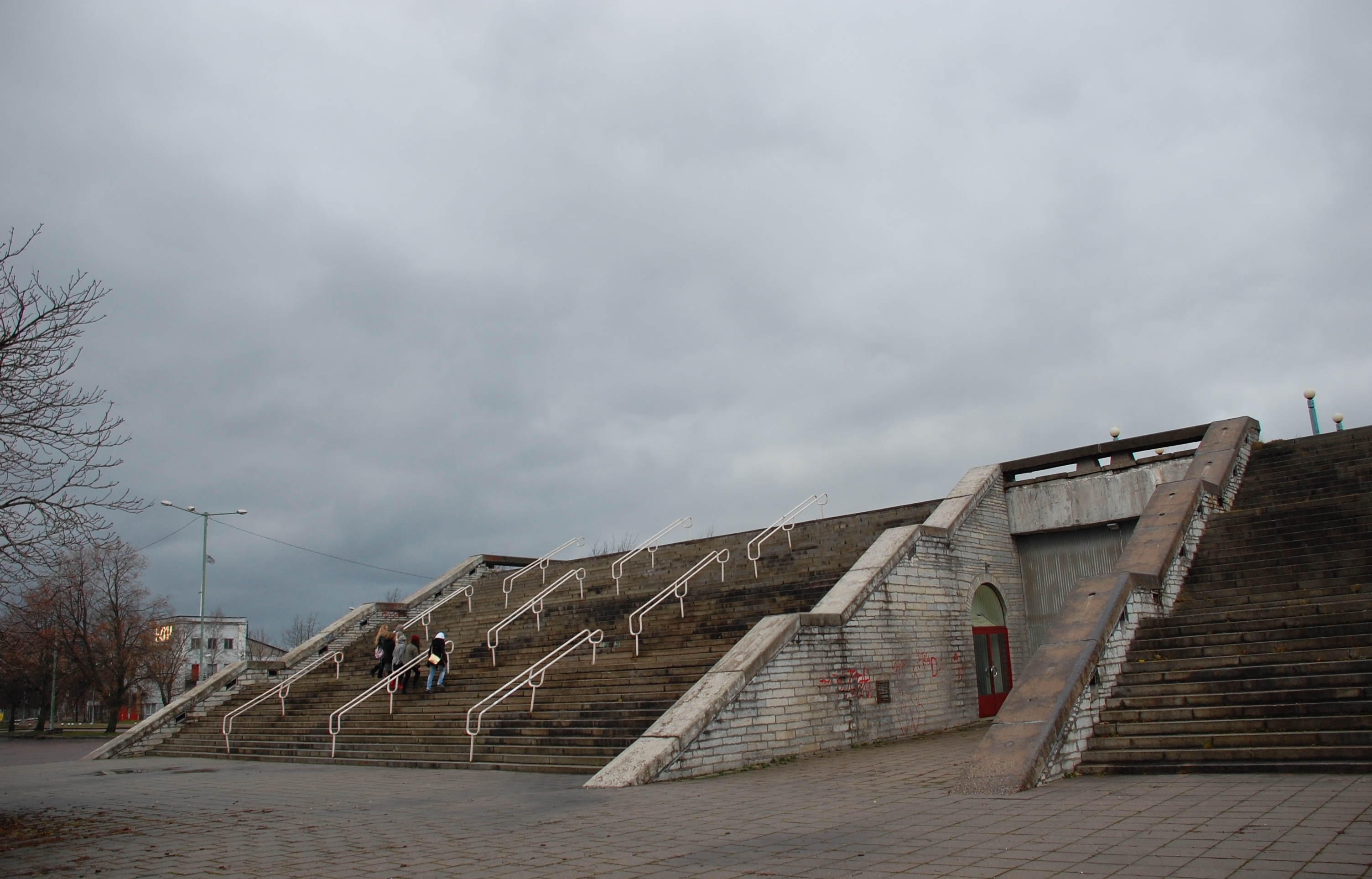
Linnahall in November 2011. Architects Raine Karp and Riina Altmäe

The music video is set in a world where a catastrophe has occurred, and the protagonist is searching for his home with other survivors. The video shows a young man dressed in scruffy clothes and covering his face, roaming with his backpack and a photograph of his home in his hand. He wanders through devastated high-rises and derelict structures in an abandoned town, wielding a flare to explore a dark building. Guided by the photo, he finally locates his home, which lies in ruins. With a final look at his home, he removes his mask, and the video fades to black.

=== Reception and follow-up ===
The music video was released on Walker's YouTube channel on 4 December, the day after the single was released. Within 24 hours of its release, the video had been viewed over 1 million times. Since its release in December 2015, it has been viewed 2 million times a day, and as of 24 February 2016, it had reached 11 million views. According to Walker's management company, MER, as of March 2017, it was being viewed approximately 1 million times per day. According to the Norwegian newspaper Bergens Tidende, it was among the top 100 most-viewed YouTube videos by September 2016.

Avatar of YouTube

YouTube
(@YouTube)
tweeted:

"Faded" will never fade away. @IAmAlanWalker joins the Billion Plays Club.

26 March 2017

The music video reached 1 billion views on YouTube on 26 March 2017, becoming the first Norwegian song to achieve this milestone. Reaching this milestone also made Walker a member of the Billion View Club. YouTube also posted a short video on its Twitter page celebrating his success. The video became the first EDM song to reach over 3 billion views on YouTube. As of March 2026, it also ranks as the 33rd most-viewed YouTube video, with over 3.9 billion views as of March 2026. As of February 2025, it has over 29 million likes, making it the 7th most-liked YouTube music video and the 26th most-liked YouTube video as of February 2024.

On 24 September 2021, the music video for "Paradise", the seventh single for Walker's follow-up album World of Walker (2021), was released on YouTube, featuring K-391 and Boy in Space as a collaboration with the mobile game PUBG: Battlegrounds. Taking place at the same time as the "Faded" music video, it serves as a retroactive expansion of "Faded", becoming the start of the "World of Walker" (WoW) universe.

=== 10th Anniversary Animated Music Video ===
On 24 December 2025, an animated music video for "Faded" was released to commemorate the song's 10th anniversary. The music video was produced by Retrever Entertainment, an animation studio founded by American animation producer Hanlin Su. In an interview with Daily Bruin, Su said that he had proposed a specific concept for one of Walker's latest songs to his manager, who then introduced him to Walker's team. After numerous exchanges and meetings, they agreed to produce a 10th-anniversary video for "Faded". Initially, it was planned to be released on 3 December, the release date of Faded, but it was ultimately released on 24 December. Since its release 24 December, the video has surpassed one million views on YouTube and over 10 million across social platforms.

== Acoustic version ==
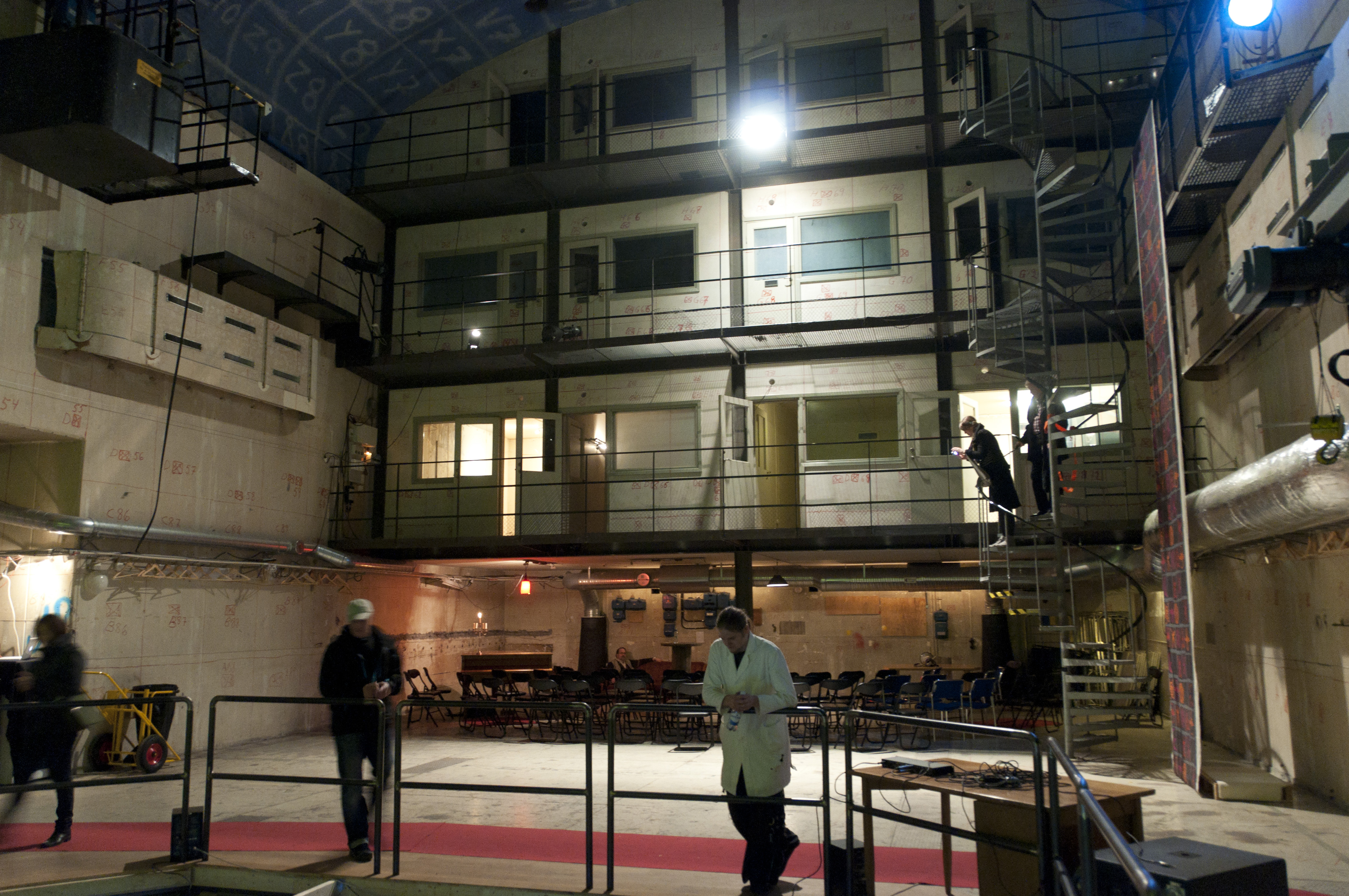
R1 reactor hall in a facility of KTH, Sweden (2010)

On 11 February 2016, Alan Walker published an acoustic version of the song, titled "Faded (Restrung)", performed on piano and strings with all the EDM elements taken out. Walker wrote in a note to The Fader that he had decided on an alternative version of "Faded" so as "to highlight other aspects of the song; to present it to another audience who may like Iselin [Solheim]'s voice and the melodies, but can't stand the electronic parts of it".

The music video for the "Restrung" version features Walker, Solheim, and a string ensemble performing in the reactor hall of the dismantled R1, Sweden's first nuclear reactor. The cast wore black hoodies bearing Walker's logo of his stylized initials. The R1 reactor hall is located underground at Sweden's Royal Institute of Technology (KTH) in Stockholm. The team who created the video for "Faded" returned for the "Restrung" version—Bror Bror was the producer, Rikkard and Tobias Häggbom were the directors, and Shahab Salehi was credited as an assistant. The atmosphere of the shoot closely resembled that of "Faded"; according to Walker, he initially wanted to film a live session but also sought to create a natural connection to the official music video.

== Remixes and EPs ==
"Faded" has been the subject of numerous remixes. "Faded (Remixes)" was released as an EP on 29 April 2016. The EP includes remixes by Tiësto, Luke Christopher, Dash Berlin, Tungevag & Raaban, and Y&V. Tiësto liked this track and produced two remixes, both of which are included on the EP. Proma Khosla of Mashable wrote that "'Faded' grew exponentially in popularity after Tiësto remixed the track". The album version of the EP, released on the same day, also included remixes by Young Bombs and Slushii in addition to the remixes included on the EP. In April 2016, Hardwell performed his remix of "Faded" on episode 261 of his online music show, Hardwell On Air. Another remix by Kryder and Tom Staar was posted to SoundCloud in May 2016 and made available for free download. The Indian DJ duo Lost Stories remix of "Faded" was released exclusively in India on 29 July 2016. The remix uses flute and is highly praised for its Indian classical touch.

The Japan-only EP of "Faded" (Japanese: フェイデッド・ジャパン・EP), was released by Sony Music Labels on 25 April 2018, to coincide with his appearance at EDC Japan in Makuhari, Chiba Prefecture, and the fact that "Faded" was the theme song for Takashi Miike's Japanese film Laplace's Witch (2018). In addition to "Faded", the EP includes "Alone", "Tired", "The Spectre", "Sing Me to Sleep", "Routine", and "Faded (Tiësto's Northern Lights Remix)".

== Live performances ==
Several female vocalists have performed the song live: Iselin Solheim (the original vocalist in the song), Ingrid Helene Håvik (vocalist of Highasakite), Tove Styrke, Alexandra Rotan, Angelina Jordan, Zara Larsson, and Torine Michelle. On 27 February 2016, he debuted his live performance of "Faded" with Iselin Solheim at the X Games Norway in Oslo, which was simultaneously aired live on Norwegian television and American broadcast network ESPN. On 7 April, he teamed up with Zara Larsson at the Echo Awards in Germany, where they performed each other's songs "Faded" and "Never Forget You". On 24 June, he performed "Faded" and "Sing Me to Sleep" with Iselin Solheim at the VG-lista Topp 20 concert at Rådhusplassen (The City Hall Square) in Oslo in front of an audience of approximately 60,000 people. The performance was broadcast live on VGTV and NRK.

== Other media ==
- "Faded" was used in the promotional video "Syria—Always Beautiful", which was released on the Ministry of Tourism of Syria's YouTube channel in September 2016.
- The song was used as the theme song for Takashi Miike's Japanese film Laplace's Witch (2018), which was released in May 2018.
- On 31 December 2025, the song was performed on the final episode, episode 978, of Dutch DJ Tiësto's radio show, Tiësto's Club Life.

== Accolades ==
"Faded" won The Cannes Lions Award at the Cannes Lions International Festival of Creativity, Best International Hit at the Eska Music Awards, and Årets Låt (Song of the Year) at Spellemannprisen '16 and was nominated for British Single of the Year at the Brit Awards.

| Year | Organization | Award | Result | Ref. |
|---|---|---|---|---|
| 2016 | P3 Gull | Årets Låt (Song of the Year) | Nominated | |
| 2016 | Cannes Lions International Festival of Creativity | Entertainment Lions for Music | Silver | |
| 2016 | Eska Music Awards | Best International Hit | Won | |
| 2017 | Spellemannprisen '16 | Årets Låt (Song of the Year) | Won | |
| 2017 | Brit Awards | British Single of the Year | Nominated | |
| 2017 | KKBox Music Awards | Best Western Single of the Year | Won | |
| 2017 | Echo Awards | Song of the Year | Nominated | |
| 2017 | Swiss Music Awards | Best International Hit | Won | |

== Track listing ==
- Digital – single
1. "Faded" – 3:32
2. "Faded" (instrumental) – 3:35
- Digital – EP
1. "Faded" – 3:32
2. "Faded" (instrumental) – 3:34
3. "Faded" (restrung) – 3:37
4. "Faded" (piano version) – 3:35
- Digital – Restrung
1. "Faded" (restrung) – 3:37
- Digital – Remixes EP
1. "Faded" (Tiesto's deep house remix) – 4:29
2. "Faded" (Dash Berlin remix) – 3:35
3. "Faded" (Tungevaag & Raaban remix) – 4:11
4. "Faded" (Y&V remix) – 4:33
5. "Faded" (Tiesto's Northern Lights remix) – 4:10
6. "Faded" (Luke Christopher remix) – 3:26
- Digital – Remixes
1. "Faded" (Tiesto's deep house remix) – 4:29
2. "Faded" (Slushii remix) – 3:31
3. "Faded" (Young Bombs remix) – 3:23
4. "Faded" (Dash Berlin remix) – 3:35
5. "Faded" (Tungevaag & Raaban remix) – 4:11
6. "Faded" (Y&V remix) – 4:33
7. "Faded" (Tiesto's Northern Lights remix) – 4:10
8. "Faded" (Luke Christopher remix) – 3:26
- CD single
1. "Faded" – 3:32
2. "Faded" (instrumental) – 3:34
3. "Faded" (restrung) – 3:37
4. "Faded" (Tiësto's deep house remix) – 4:29
5. "Faded" (Tiёsto's Northern Lights remix) – 4:10
- 7-inch

A-side

1. "Faded" – 3:32

B-side

1. "Faded" (instrumental) – 3:35
2. "Faded" (restrung) – 3:37
- Digital – Remixes II
1. "Faded" (Slushii remix) – 3:31
2. "Faded" (Young Bombs remix) – 3:22
- Digital – Lost Stories remix
1. "Faded" (Lost Stories remix) – 3:31
- CD – EP (Japan)
1. "Faded" – 3:32
2. "Alone" – 3:34
3. "Tired" – 3:37
4. "The Spectre" – 3:11
5. "Sing Me to Sleep" – 3:11
6. "Routine" – 2:48
7. "Faded" (Tiёsto's Northern Lights remix) – 4:10

== Personnel ==
Credits were adapted from Apple Music.

- Alan Walker – producer, songwriter, programming
- Iselin Solheim – vocals
- Jesper Borgen – songwriter, vocal producer, vocal recording engineer, background vocals
- Ingrid Helgor Skretting – vocals
- Gunnar Greve – songwriter, executive producer
- Anders Frøen – songwriter, vocal producer
- Sören Von Malmborg – mastering engineer, mixing engineer

== Charts ==
=== Weekly charts ===
Weekly chart performance for "Faded"
| Chart (2016–2018) | Peak position |
|---|---|
| Argentina (Monitor Latino) | 8 |
| Australia (ARIA) | 2 |
| Austria (Ö3 Austria Top 40) | 1 |
| Belgium (Ultratop 50 Flanders) | 2 |
| Belgium (Ultratop 50 Wallonia) | 1 |
| Canada Hot 100 (Billboard) | 32 |
| Canada CHR/Top 40 (Billboard) | 42 |
| CIS Airplay (TopHit) | 1 |
| Czech Republic Singles Digital (ČNS IFPI) | 1 |
| Denmark (Tracklisten) | 3 |
| Ecuador (National-Report) | 3 |
| Euro Digital Song Sales (Billboard) | 2 |
| Finland (Suomen virallinen lista) | 1 |
| Finland Airplay (Radiosoittolista) | 2 |
| France (SNEP) | 1 |
| Germany (GfK) | 1 |
| Germany Dance (GfK) | 1 |
| Guatemala (Monitor Latino) | 11 |
| Greece Digital Songs (Billboard) | 2 |
| Hungary (Dance Top 40) | 1 |
| Hungary (Rádiós Top 40) | 5 |
| Hungary (Single Top 40) | 1 |
| Hungary (Stream Top 40) | 1 |
| Ireland (IRMA) | 6 |
| Israel International Airplay (Media Forest) | 8 |
| Italy (FIMI) | 1 |
| Japan Hot 100 (Billboard) | 33 |
| Latvia (Latvijas Top 40) | 1 |
| Lebanon (Lebanese Top 20) | 3 |
| Mexico Airplay (Billboard) | 2 |
| Netherlands (Dutch Top 40) | 2 |
| Netherlands (Single Top 100) | 2 |
| New Zealand (Recorded Music NZ) | 2 |
| Norway (VG-lista) | 1 |
| Poland Airplay (ZPAV) | 1 |
| Poland (Video Chart) | 1 |
| Portugal (AFP) | 2 |
| Portugal Digital Songs (Billboard) | 1 |
| Romania TV Airplay (Media Forest) | 1 |
| Russia Airplay (TopHit) | 1 |
| Scotland Singles (OCC) | 4 |
| Serbia (Radiomonitor) | 1 |
| Slovakia Singles Digital (ČNS IFPI) | 1 |
| Slovenia (SloTop50) | 3 |
| South Africa Airplay (EMA) | 3 |
| South Korea International (Gaon) | 13 |
| Spain (Promusicae) | 1 |
| Sweden (Sverigetopplistan) | 1 |
| Switzerland (Schweizer Hitparade) | 1 |
| Switzerland (Media Control Romandy) | 1 |
| UK Singles (Official Charts) | 7 |
| UK Dance (Official Charts) | 2 |
| Ukraine Airplay (TopHit) | 1 |
| US Billboard Hot 100 | 80 |
| US Dance Club Songs (Billboard) | 4 |
| US Hot Dance/Electronic Songs (Billboard) | 7 |

2020 weekly chart performance for "Faded"
| Chart (2020) | Position |
|---|---|
| Global Excl. US (Billboard) | 147 |

=== Monthly charts ===
Monthly chart performance for "Faded"
| Chart (2016–2018) | Peak position |
|---|---|
| CIS Airplay (TopHit) | 1 |
| Russia Airplay (TopHit) | 1 |
| South Korea International (Gaon) | 11 |

=== Year-end charts ===
2016 year-end chart performance for "Faded"
| Chart (2016) | Position |
|---|---|
| Argentina (Monitor Latino) | 22 |
| Australia (ARIA) | 17 |
| Austria (Ö3 Austria Top 40) | 1 |
| Belgium (Ultratop Flanders) | 5 |
| Belgium (Ultratop Wallonia) | 5 |
| Canada (Canadian Hot 100) | 57 |
| CIS Airplay (Tophit) | 2 |
| Denmark (Tracklisten) | 5 |
| France (SNEP) | 8 |
| Germany (GfK) | 1 |
| Hungary (Dance Top 40) | 7 |
| Hungary (Rádiós Top 40) | 26 |
| Iceland (Plötutíóindi) | 25 |
| Hungary (Single Top 40) | 3 |
| Israel (Media Forest) | 16 |
| Italy (FIMI) | 2 |
| Netherlands (Dutch Top 40) | 6 |
| Netherlands (Single Top 100) | 4 |
| New Zealand (Recorded Music NZ) | 17 |
| Poland (ZPAV) | 15 |
| Russia Airplay (Tophit) | 2 |
| Slovenia (SloTop50) | 16 |
| South Korea International (Gaon) | 54 |
| Spain (PROMUSICAE) | 8 |
| Switzerland (Schweizer Hitparade) | 1 |
| Sweden (Sverigetopplistan) | 1 |
| Ukraine Airplay (Tophit) | 3 |
| UK Singles (Official Charts Company) | 28 |
| US Hot Dance/Electronic Songs (Billboard) | 16 |

2017 year-end chart performance for "Faded"
| Chart (2017) | Position |
|---|---|
| Brazil (Pro-Música Brasil) | 196 |
| CIS Airplay (Tophit) | 150 |
| Hungary (Dance Top 40) | 44 |
| Hungary (Rádiós Top 40) | 26 |
| Hungary (Single Top 40) | 46 |
| South Korea International (Gaon) | 19 |
| Sweden (Sverigetopplistan) | 99 |
| Switzerland (Schweizer Hitparade) | 56 |

2018 year-end chart performance for "Faded"
| Chart (2018) | Position |
|---|---|
| South Korea International (Gaon) | 14 |

2019 year-end chart performance for "Faded"
| Chart (2019) | Position |
|---|---|
| South Korea International (Gaon) | 192 |

=== Decade-end charts ===
2010s-end chart performance for "Faded"
| Chart (2010–2019) | Position |
|---|---|
| Austria (Ö3 Austria Top 40) | 16 |
| CIS Airplay (TopHit) | 67 |
| Germany (GfK) | 6 |
| Netherlands (Dutch Top 40) | 100 |
| Netherlands (Single Top 100) | 67 |
| Russia Airplay (TopHit) | 131 |
| Ukraine Airplay (TopHit) | 22 |

=== All-time charts ===
| Chart | Position |
|---|---|
| Netherlands (Dutch Top 40) | 207 |
| Netherlands (Single Top 100) | 244 |
| Norway (VG-lista) | 29 |
| Sweden (Sverigetopplistan) | 76 |

== Certifications ==
Certifications and sales for "Faded"
| Region | Certification | Certified units/sales |
|---|---|---|
| Argentina (CAPIF) | Platinum | 20,000^{*} |
| Australia (ARIA) | 7× Platinum | 490,000^{‡} |
| Austria (IFPI Austria) | 3× Platinum | 90,000^{‡} |
| Belgium (BRMA) | 2× Platinum | 40,000^{‡} |
| Canada (Music Canada) | 8× Platinum | 640,000^{‡} |
| Denmark (IFPI Danmark) | 4× Platinum | 360,000^{‡} |
| France (SNEP) | Gold | 66,666^{‡} |
| Germany (BVMI) | 7× Gold | 1,400,000^{‡} |
| Italy (FIMI) | 9× Platinum | 450,000^{‡} |
| Mexico (AMPROFON) | 2× Diamond+4× Platinum | 840,000^{‡} |
| Netherlands (NVPI) | Platinum | 40,000^{‡} |
| New Zealand (RMNZ) | 5× Platinum | 150,000^{‡} |
| Norway (IFPI Norway) | 11× Platinum | 440,000^{‡} |
| Poland (ZPAV) | 2× Diamond | 200,000^{‡} |
| Portugal (AFP) | 2× Platinum | 40,000^{‡} |
| South Korea (Gaon) | — | 499,944 |
| Spain (Promusicae) | 4× Platinum | 160,000^{‡} |
| Sweden (GLF) | 13× Platinum | 520,000^{‡} |
| Switzerland (IFPI Switzerland) | 5× Platinum | 150,000^{‡} |
| United Kingdom (BPI) | 3× Platinum | 1,800,000^{‡} |
| United States (RIAA) | 3× Platinum | 3,000,000^{‡} |
Streaming
| Japan (RIAJ) | Silver | 30,000,000^{†} |
^{*} Sales figures based on certification alone.^{‡} Sales+streaming figures based on certification alone.^{†} Streaming-only figures based on certification alone.

== Release history ==
Release dates for "Faded"
| Region | Date | Version | Format | Label | Ref. |
|---|---|---|---|---|---|
| Various | 3 December 2015 | Original | Digital download | MER | |
| Various | 3 December 2015 | EP | Digital download | MER | |
| Various | 12 February 2016 | Restrung | Digital download | MER | |
| Various | 29 April 2016 | Remixes EP | Digital download | MER | |
| Various | 29 April 2016 | Remixes | Digital download | MER | |
| Various | 13 May 2016 | Single | CD | MER; Sony | |
| Norway | 27 May 2016 | Original, restrung | 7-inch | MER; Sony | |
| Various | 27 May 2016 | Remixes II | Digital download | MER | |
| India | 29 July 2016 | Lost Stories Remix | Digital download | MER | |
| Japan | 25 April 2018 | EP | CD | Sony | |

== See also ==
- List of most-liked YouTube videos
- List of most-streamed songs on Spotify
- List of most-viewed YouTube videos
