= Backing vocalist =

Singer who provides vocal harmony on a song

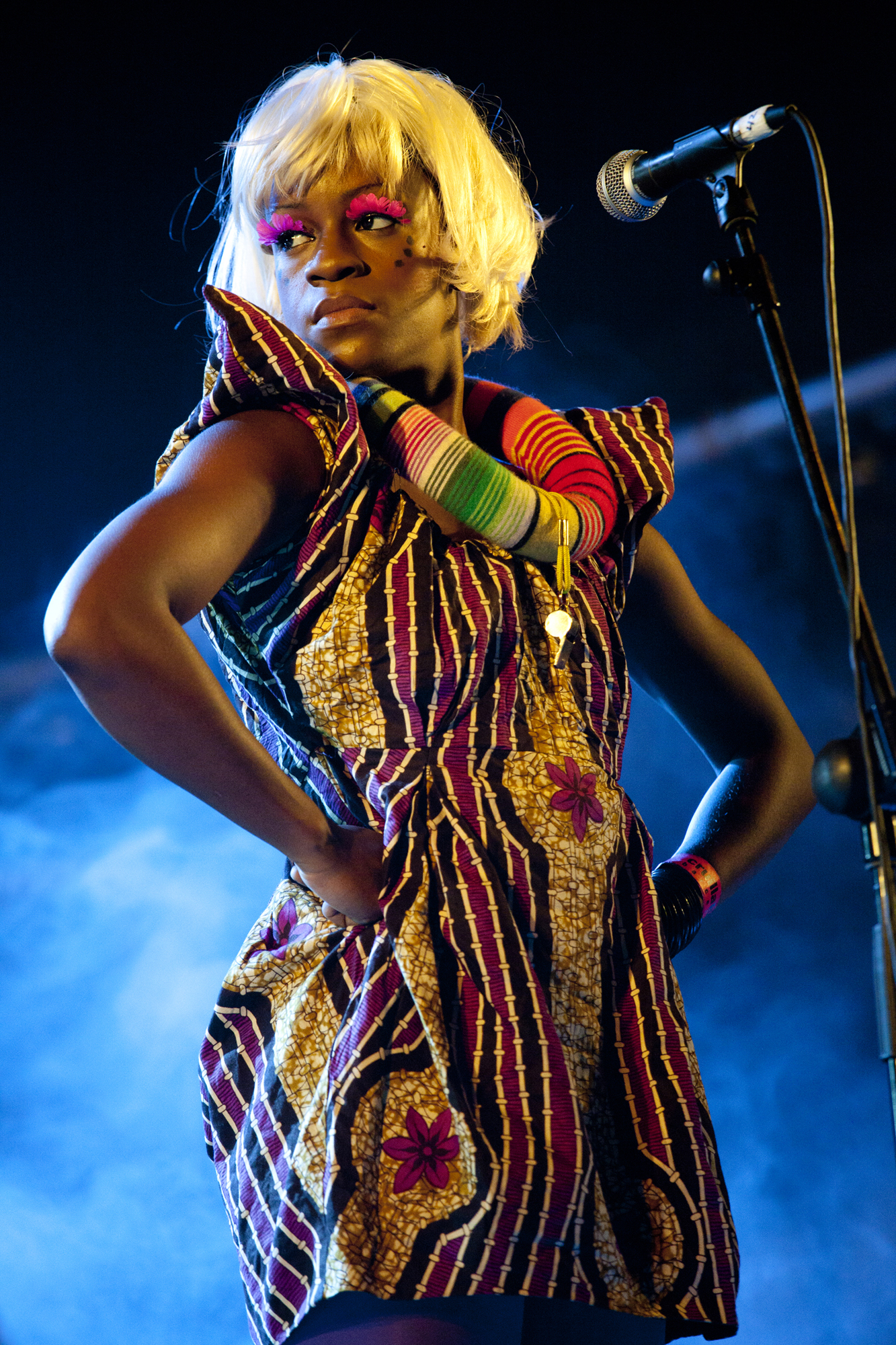
One of the Wives, the backing vocalists for English singer Ebony Bones

A backing vocalist is a singer who provides vocal harmony with the lead vocalist or other backing vocalists. A backing vocalist may also sing alone as a lead-in to the main vocalist's entry or to sing a counter-melody. Backing vocalists are used in a broad range of popular music, traditional music, and world music styles.

Solo artists may employ professional backing vocalists in studio recording sessions as well as during concerts. In many rock and metal bands (e.g., the power trio), the musicians doing backing vocals also play instruments, such as guitar, electric bass or keyboards. In Latin or Afro-Cuban groups, backing singers may play percussion instruments or shakers while singing. In some pop, R&B, and hip-hop groups and in musical theater, they may be required to perform dance routines while singing through headset microphones.

Styles of background vocals vary according to the type of song and genre of music. In pop and country songs, backing vocalists may sing harmony to support the lead vocalist. In hardcore punk or rockabilly, other band members who play instruments may sing or shout backing vocals during the chorus (refrain) section of the songs.

== Terminology ==
Alternative terms for or referring to backing vocalists include backing singer, backing vocals, additional vocals, harmony vocalist (sometimes shortened to just harmony), or, particularly in the United States and Canada, backup singer or background singer.

== Examples ==
While some bands use performers whose sole on-stage role is backing vocals, backing singers commonly have other roles. Two notable examples of band members who sang back-up are The Beach Boys and The Beatles. The Beach Boys were well known for their close vocal harmonies, occasionally with all five members singing at once such as "In My Room" and "Surfer Girl".

The Beatles were also known for their close style of vocal harmonies – all of them sang both lead and backing vocals at some point, especially John Lennon and Paul McCartney, who frequently supported each other with harmonies, often with fellow Beatle George Harrison joining in. Ringo Starr, while not as prominent as a backup singer due to his distinctive voice, sings backing vocals in such tracks as "The Continuing Story of Bungalow Bill" and "Carry That Weight". Examples of three-part harmonies by Lennon, McCartney and Harrison include "Nowhere Man", "Because", "Day Tripper", and "This Boy". The members of Crosby, Stills, Nash & Young and Bee Gees each wrote songs, sang backup or lead vocals, and played various instruments in their performances and recordings.

== Lyrics ==
In the lyrics, the backing vocals are standardly written in parentheses to differentiate them from the main vocals, which are written without any markup. The backing vocals for a line may come in mid-line, or even after the main lyrics have already been sung. Vocalizing is fairly common so as to not detract from the meaning of the lyrics of the primary vocals. The sound of the backing vocals is often in a differing style (e.g., either more muted or pitched up) so as to complement rather than compete with the main parts.

== Lead singers who record backing vocals ==
In the recording studio, some lead singers record their own backing vocals by overdubbing with a multitrack recording system, record their own backing vocals, then recording the lead part over them. Some lead vocalists prefer this approach because multiple parts recorded by the same singer blend well.

A famous example overdubbing is Freddie Mercury's multipart intro to Queen's "Bohemian Rhapsody". Other artists who have recorded multitrack lead and backing vocals include Patrick Stump of Fall Out Boy, Tom DeLonge of Blink-182 and Angels and Airwaves, Wednesday 13 in his own band and Murderdolls, Ian Gillan of Deep Purple, Brendon Urie of Panic! at the Disco, Simon Le Bon of Duran Duran, Gary Barlow of Take That, Brandon Flowers of The Killers, Matt Bellamy of Muse and Brad Delp of Boston.

With the exception of a few songs on each album, Michael Jackson, Janet Jackson, Prince, Dan Fogelberg, Eddie Rabbitt, David Bowie, Harry Nilsson, and Richard Marx sing all of the background vocals for their songs. Robert Smith of the Cure sings his own backing vocals in the studio, and doesn't use backing vocalists when performing live.

== Uncredited backing vocals ==
Prominent vocalists who provide backing vocals in other artists' recordings are often uncredited to avoid conflicts with their own recording agreements, and for other reasons. Examples include:

- "Roll with Me, Henry" by Etta James, which includes Richard Berry, author of "Louie Louie", performing the role of Henry.
- Sam Cooke's "Bring It On Home to Me", with vocal "echo" responses by Lou Rawls.
- John Lennon and Paul McCartney on the Rolling Stones' "We Love You".
- Ronnie Spector on Eddie Money's "Take Me Home Tonight", from the Ronettes' 1963 hit "Be My Baby".
- Mick Jagger doing background vocals on Carly Simon's recording of "You're So Vain", which led to the erroneous theory that the song was about Jagger.
- Paul McCartney as one of the background revellers on Donovan's 1966 "Mellow Yellow". (Contrary to popular belief, McCartney does not whisper "quite rightly" in the chorus, but Donovan himself).
- Andrew Gold's "Never Let Her Slip Away", with harmony vocals by Freddie Mercury.
- Jonathan Richman's "The Neighbors", featuring Jody Ross.
- Rockwell's "Somebody's Watching Me", with backing vocals by Jermaine Jackson and Michael Jackson.
- "Bad Blood" by Neil Sedaka, with backing vocals by Elton John.
- Patti LaBelle on Kanye West's "Roses" from the album Late Registration. She said the liner notes were already printed when she lent her vocals to the track.
- Usher's "Superstar", with vocals by Faith Evans.
- Mýa's background vocals on "Get None", the debut single by Tamar Braxton.
- Al B. Sure!'s background vocals in Guy's song "You Can Call Me Crazy". (According to producer Teddy Riley, the song was originally planned for Sure!'s debut album In Effect Mode but didn't make the final cut.)
- Mint Condition frontman Stokley Williams doing background vocals on "The Curse of the Gifted" from Wale's 2013 album The Gifted.
- Eric Roberson's background vocals on Cam'ron's song "Tomorrow" from his 2002 album Come Home with Me.
- Noonie Bao's vocals on Avicii's and Nicky Romero's 2012 single "I Could Be the One".
- Anelia's vocals on Andrea's 2014 song Най-добрата (Nay-dobrata).
- Jamie Foxx's vocals on Ariana Grande's 2015 single "Focus".
- Ina Wroldsen's vocals on Calvin Harris's and Disciples's 2015 song "How Deep Is Your Love".
- Iselin Solheim's vocals on Alan Walker's 2015 song "Faded", and his 2016 song "Sing Me to Sleep".
- Billie Eilish's vocals on Labrinth's 2023 song "Never Felt So Alone".

== See also ==
- Hype man, a type of backing vocalist especially in hip hop music
- List of backing groups
- Nebenstimme
- Vocaloid
- 20 Feet from Stardom (2013 documentary film on backing singers)
