= Iselin Solheim =

Norwegian singer-songwriter

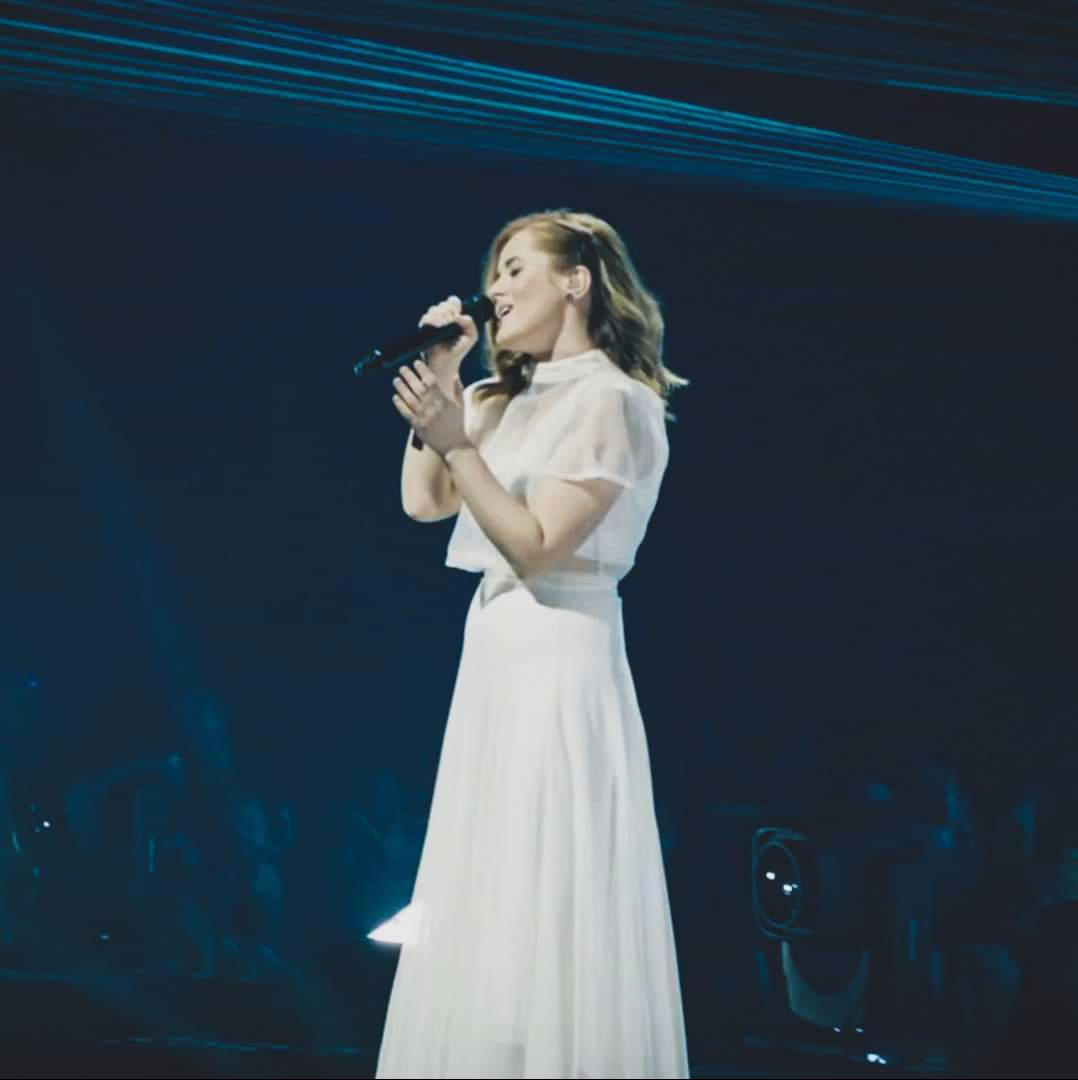
- Iselin performing in 2019

Background information
- Also known as: Iselin
- Born: Iselin Løken Solheim; 20 June 1990 (age 36); Naustdal Municipality, Norway
- Origin: Oslo, Norway
- Genres: Folk pop; synth-pop
- Occupations: Singer; songwriter
- Instrument: Vocals
- Years active: 2007–present
- Label: Warner Music Sweden

Iselin Løken Solheim (born 20 June 1990), first known as Iselin Solheim and then simply as Iselin, is a Norwegian singer-songwriter. She is well known for her vocals on Alan Walker's singles "Faded" (2015) and "Sing Me to Sleep" (2016) and Gryffin's single "Just for a Moment" (2018).

Iselin started her music career in 2007 and her songs are mainly in English. After signing with Bisi, she released her debut single in 2012. She started going mononymously around 2017.

== Career ==
Iselin Løken Solheim was born in Naustdal Municipality, located in Sogn og Fjordane county, Norway and started singing at a young age. In 2007 she participated in the Norwegian version of Pop Idol named Idol - Jakten på en superstjerne, where she placed in the top 40. In 2009, after high school she attended Skiringssal Folkehøgskule in Sandefjord, where she mainly studied music and then began writing her own songs. In 2010, she attended The Institute for Performing Arts in Liverpool, where she studied Popularize Music & Sound Technology. Here she developed as an artist and performer, starting with new projects and cultivating her own sounds.

After returning to Norway from the United Kingdom, Bisi Music signed her immediately. She then released her well-received debut single "What's Happening", which received wide airplay and was selected Song of the Week for the national radio station Radio Norge. At that time Solheim met Jesper Borgen together with her former manager Hilde Wahl from Bisi Music to test out a new partnership. They later on wrote the text, melody and produced the song "The Wizard of Us" and "Oracle" together in 2013. Her next single "Giants" was released in 2015.

In late 2015 and early 2016, she lent her vocals on Alan Walker's songs "Faded" and "Sing Me to Sleep".

In 2018, Solheim released the solo track "Bathtub". She says of the song:

I'd done the singer-songwriter thing for a while and all of my friends started to get educations and stuff, and I kind of got insecure about music for the first time… whether I should do it or not… it all got a bit too much. [...] I felt a bit stressed a while ago, and at the time I was supposed to have many sessions in Stockholm. After one of my sessions I retreated to my hotel bathtub to unwind, and was inspired to write the track.

She then released her next single "Lost" in September and an acoustic version in October 2018. "Anyone Out There" was released in February 2019.

Felix Cartal's single "Walking By" (2018), Gryffin's single "Just for a Moment" (2018) and 3lau & Justin Caruso's single "Better With You" (2019) all featured Solheim.

Iselin has also co-written songs for, among others, R3hab, Matoma, SKAAR, Inna, Broiler, James Carter, and Martin Tungevaag.

== Discography ==
=== Singles ===
==== As lead artist ====
Title	Year	Album
Credited as Iselin Solheim
"What's Happening"	2012	Non-album singles
"The Wizard of Us"	2013	Non-album singles
"Oracle"	2013	Non-album singles
"Giants"	2015	Non-album singles
"Listen"	2016	Non-album singles
Credited as Iselin
"Bathtub"	2018	Non-album singles
"Lost"	2018	Non-album singles
"Anyone Out There"	2019	Non-album singles

==== As featured artist ====
Title	Year	Album/EP
Credited as Iselin Solheim
"Usynlig" (Cir.Cuz featuring Iselin Solheim)	2013	Vi Er Cir.Cuz
"Giants" (Lotus with Montis featuring Iselin Solheim)	2017	Non-album single
Credited as Iselin
"Do You Care" (Ryan Riback featuring Iselin)	2017	Non-album single
"Walking By" (Felix Cartal featuring Iselin)	2018	Next Season
"Listen" (Seeb featuring Iselin)	2018	Nice to Meet You
"Just for a Moment" (Gryffin featuring Iselin)	2018	Gravity
"On Me" (Samuraii featuring Iselin)	2018	Non-album singles
"Better with You" (3LAU and Justin Caruso featuring Iselin)	2019	Non-album singles
"Clear Water" (Karl Zine featuring Iselin)	2019	Non-album singles

=== Other songs ===
Title	Year	Platform
"Coloured Sky"	2011	SoundCloud
"Dancing in the Rain" (with Mari T Jorgensen)	2011	YouTube
"Crazy Town" (featuring Jesper Borgen)	2012	YouTube

=== Production credits ===
Title	Year	Artist	Role
"Faded"	2015	Alan Walker	Uncredited vocalist
"Sing Me to Sleep"	2016	Alan Walker	Uncredited vocalist
"Mood"	2018	Felix Cartal	Writer
"Distant Memory"	2021	R3hab, W&W and Timmy Trumpet	Writer
"paw, paw!"	2026	Illit	Writer
"You're Under Arrest"	2026	Illit	Writer

=== Music videos ===
Title	Year	Directors
"The Wizard of Us"	2013	—N/a
"Faded (Restrung)"	2015	Rikkard Häggbom; Tobias Häggbom
"Giants"	2015	—N/a
