= Fade (instrumental) =

Single by Alan Walker

from the album NCS: Uplifting and the EP Origins
- Released: 19 November 2014
- Genre: Electro house
- Length: 4:20
- Label: NoCopyrightSounds (2014–2021); Corite (2021–present)
- Producer: Alan Walker

Alan Walker singles chronology
"Fade" (2014)	"Spectre" (2015)

Alternate cover art
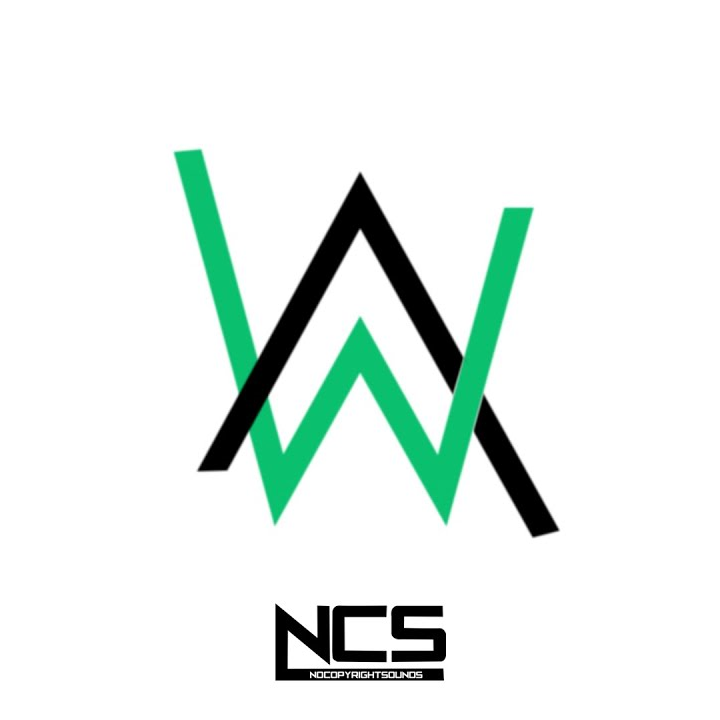

Music video
- "Fade" on YouTube

"Fade" is an instrumental electro house track produced by Norwegian producer Alan Walker. It was released through his YouTube channel on 17 August 2014 (one week before his 17th birthday), before being re-released through NoCopyrightSounds (NCS) three months later on 19 November to celebrate that channel's one million-subscriber milestone. "Fade" was featured as the seventh song of the NCS: Uplifting album, but it was removed on 12 November 2021 due to Walker's contract with NCS expiring. The remake version of "Fade" is "Faded".

== Background and release ==
At first, when creating "Fade", the idea was to create a tropical house sound, but then an electro house drop was inserted into the song. However, tropical house and electro house did not blend well together, so he decided to make it completely electro house. Walker was inspired by the music producer Ahrix's sound on his track "Nova" from 2013. In an interview he stated: "The melodies and the way the track progresses are what's so unique and it's what inspired me to create 'Fade' which later on became 'Faded.'" The style was also inspired by the Norwegian producer K-391.

In 2014, Walker sent a song called "Fade" to Billy Woodford, founder of the British record label NoCopyrightSounds (NCS), who thought the song was unique and appropriate for the NCS community and released it after it had surpassed one million subscribers.

== Commercial performance ==
"Fade" was Walker's first release and became part of the compilation album NCS: Uplifting. In parallel, the songs offered on this album were offered as free downloads on the company's website and appeared as single tracks on music streaming services such as Spotify and Napster. With its royalty-free release, the song received strong distribution, being used in countless web videos. On both the video platform YouTube and portals such as SoundCloud, "Fade" was a huge success, receiving over 433 million views on YouTube alone. It also reached number 18 on the UK Independent Single Breakers Chart and number 3 on the Swedish Heatseekers Chart in Sweden.

== Deletion from NCS ==
On 12 November 2021, Walker's contract with NCS expired, and "Fade", along with "Spectre" and "Force", was removed from the NCS YouTube channel. At the time, it was NCS's most popular video, with 448.31 million views.

After that, NCS addressed the removal of Walker's tracks from the label on Facebook. This was followed by a response from Walker himself.

== Re-release from Corite ==
In 2022, Walker signed with Corite, a Swedish crowdfunding website that allows fans to invest in music projects. Walker raised more than $100,000 from fans for his next musical project and released a compilation EP called Origins, which includes "Fade", "Spectre", and "Force".

== Music video ==
On 23 July 2022, Walker uploaded a new official music video for "Fade". In the video, he walked around his childhood home in Bergen and looked at family photos. He then went to the production studio in his bedroom to view the original Fade files on his laptop. He could see his fellow walkers waiting for him through the window and eventually walked out of the house. The video is part of a new series of official music videos for his former NCS releases, called "Origins". The uploading of these videos to Walker's channel is also not necessarily to make up for the songs that were removed from NCS, but rather as a sign of Walker's intention to "go back to the beginning with the music that started it all".

== Charts ==
Chart (2016)	Peak position
Sweden Heatseekers (Sverigetopplistan)	3
UK Independent Singles (OCC)	18
