= Tired (Alan Walker song) =

Single by Alan Walker featuring Gavin James
- Released: 19 May 2017
- Genre: Future bass; tropical house
- Length: 3:12
- Label: Mer Musikk, Sony Music
- Songwriters: Mike Needle; Marcus Arnbekk; Lars Kristian Rosness; Daniel Bryer; Fredrik Borch Olsen; Gunnar Greve; Gavin Wigglesworth; Alan Walker; Oliver Green; Anders Frøen
- Producers: Lars Kristian Rosness; Anders Frøen; Gunnar Greve; Marcus Arnbekk; Carl Hovind; Fredrik Borch Olsen; Alan Walker

Alan Walker singles chronology
"Back to Beautiful" (2017)	"Tired" (2017)	"The Spectre" (2017)

Gavin James singles chronology
"I Don't Know Why" (2017)	"Tired" (2017)	"Hearts on Fire" (2017)

Audio sample
- "Tired": file; help

Music video
- "Tired" on YouTube

"Tired" is a song by Norwegian DJ and music producer Alan Walker, featuring Irish singer-songwriter Gavin James. The song was written by Mike Needle, Dan Bryer, Gavin James and Ollie Green, and was produced by Alan Walker, Gunnar Greve, Mood Melodies, Lars Kristian Rosness, Marcus Arnbekk, Fredrik Borch Olsen and Carl Hovind. It was released commercially for digital download on 19 May 2017. On 14 July 2017, Kygo released a remix of the song.

== Background ==
Walker performed "Tired" in his live performances before the single's public release. On 15 May 2017, Alan Walker released an artwork video teaser for the single on social media, in which the single's cover art was revealed. A trailer was released on 17 May 2017, revealing more details of the music video for the song, with the instrumental version of the song as background music.

On the occasion of the single release, Walker said: "I'm very excited to finally release 'Tired'. I feel it adds another dimension to my productions. Also, it is my first release with a male vocalist, and I'm very grateful to have Gavin James join me on this one. He has an amazing voice, has written an incredible song and I hope my fans will enjoy it as much as I do!" James added: "Delighted to be working with Alan on this track, he's such a talent, I love his sound and what he has done for the song! Can't wait for both of our audiences to hear it!"

== Critical reception ==
Matt Medved of Billboard regarded "Tired" as a song that "showcases Walker's signature melodic production within a more radio-friendly format than his previous outings." Dancing Astronaut said, "James delivers a reassuring verse with his usual emotive approach, while Walker provides a moving underlay with bursts of pitched-up synths and a simple yet impactful topline that pairs well with the track's bassline."

== Music video ==
The artwork video of the song's cover and the trailer was released on May 15 and 17, respectively. The official music video was then released on May 19, 2017. The video begins as the solar flare named "Eleanor" is expected to impact Earth in 47 minutes, according to the music video trailer. The music video included flashbacks, some scenes of panicking crowds running around the streets, and newscast footages of random rioting and in terms of violence. In the final moments before the storm hits, a black-bloc-hooded man and a woman held their hands together as the countdown approaches, and as the solar storm hits Earth, the entire city and the world immediately blacks out due to the total loss of global electrical power and the music video ends.

Chronologically, a sequel of "Tired", All Falls Down was released that same year on October 26 and it shows the aftermath of the "Solar Storm Eleanor", about hundreds of years after the storm's impact.

As of March 10, 2020, "Tired" has amassed 128 million views and 1.3 million likes.

== Track listing ==
Digital download
No.	Title	Length
1.	"Tired" (featuring Gavin James)	3:12

Digital download – Remixes
No.	Title	Length
1.	"Tired" (Axollo Remix)	3:49
2.	"Tired" (Lemarroy Remix)	3:16
3.	"Tired" (Kovan and Alex Skrindo Remix)	3:20

Digital download – Remixes
No.	Title	Length
1.	"Tired" (Axollo Remix)	3:49
2.	"Tired" (Lemarroy Remix)	3:16
3.	"Tired" (Kovan and Alex Skrindo Remix)	3:20
4.	"Tired" (Alan Walker Remix)	3:30
5.	"Tired" (Bruno Martini Remix)	4:29
6.	"Tired" (K-391 Remix)	3:15
7.	"Tired" (Steerner and Tobu Remix)	3:22

Digital download – Kygo Remix
No.	Title	Length
1.	"Tired" (Kygo Remix)	4:00

== Credits and personnel ==
Credits adapted from Tidal.

- Alan Walker, Marcus Arnbekk, Lars Kristian Rosness, Fredrik Borch Olsen, Mood Melodies – composer, producer
- Gavin James, Mike Needle, Dan Bryer, Oliver Green – composer
- Gunnar Greve – composer, producer, executive producer
- Carl Hovind – producer
- Miles Walker – mixing engineer
- Björn Engelmann – mastering engineer
- Eirik Næss – guitarist
- Andre Viervoll – organist

== Charts ==
=== Weekly charts ===
Chart (2017–19)	Peak position
Australia (ARIA)	68
Austria (Ö3 Austria Top 40)	35
Colombia (National-Report)	69
Czech Republic Airplay (ČNS IFPI)	7
Czech Republic Singles Digital (ČNS IFPI)	59
Germany (GfK)	66
Hungary (Dance Top 40)	14
Hungary (Rádiós Top 40)	3
Hungary (Single Top 40)	24
Ireland (IRMA)	78
Latvia (Latvijas Top 40)	35
Mexico Airplay (Billboard)	47
New Zealand Heatseekers (RMNZ)	8
Norway (VG-lista)	5
Poland Airplay (ZPAV)	16
Slovakia Airplay (ČNS IFPI)	63
Slovakia Singles Digital (ČNS IFPI)	59
Sweden (Sverigetopplistan)	21
Switzerland (Schweizer Hitparade)	64
US Dance Club Songs (Billboard)	6
US Hot Dance/Electronic Songs (Billboard)	26

=== Year-end charts ===
Chart (2017)	Position
Hungary (Rádiós Top 40)	61
Sweden (Sverigetopplistan)	79
US Hot Dance/Electronic Songs (Billboard)	75

Chart (2019)	Position
Hungary (Dance Top 40)	63
Hungary (Rádiós Top 40)	41

== Certifications ==
Region	Certification	Certified units/sales
Australia (ARIA)	Gold	35,000^{‡}
Austria (IFPI Austria)	Gold	15,000^{‡}
Canada (Music Canada)	Platinum	80,000^{‡}
Germany (BVMI)	Gold	200,000^{‡}
Italy (FIMI)	Gold	25,000^{‡}
Mexico (AMPROFON)	Platinum	60,000^{‡}
New Zealand (RMNZ)	Gold	15,000^{‡}
Norway (IFPI Norway)	3× Platinum	180,000^{‡}
Poland (ZPAV)	Platinum	20,000^{‡}
Sweden (GLF)	2× Platinum	80,000^{‡}
^{‡} Sales+streaming figures based on certification alone.

== Release history ==
Region	Date	Format	Version	Label	Ref.
Various	19 May 2017	Digital download	Original	Mer Musikk	
Various	23 June 2017	Digital download	Remixes	Mer Musikk	
Various	14 July 2017	Digital download	Kygo Remix	Mer Musikk	
