= Mood Melodies =

- Birth name: Anders Frøen
- Origin: Oslo, Norway
- Genres: Pop; electropop; R&B; hip hop
- Occupations: Songwriter; record producer
- Instruments: Piano; keyboard; guitar
- Years active: 2013–present
- Website: moodmelodies.com

Anders Frøen, professionally known as Mood Melodies, is a Norwegian record producer and songwriter. He has produced and written songs for Zedd, Jessie J, Alan Walker, Brandy and Karmin.

== Career ==
Mood Melodies got his big international break when Alan Walker's "Faded" became an international hit in 2016, with more than 3 billion YouTube views to date. He signed to Stargate and Sony/ATV's joint venture publishing company Stellar Songs in 2016.

=== Alan Walker controversy ===
In May 2017, Future Music Magazine uploaded a video in which showcases how Alan Walker's song "Alone" was produced. However, throughout the video, Walker appears very uncertain in the video and conveys a sense of planlessness or helplessness, whereas Melodies was able to convey the production process in great detail. This was met with overwhelmingly negative responses from fans, particularly those of Walker. The event allegedly lead Mood Melodies to step down from co-producing with Walker, leading to many of his later songs like "On My Way" and "Alone, pt. II" receiving mixed-to-negative reviews from fans, whom most of them favor Walker's signature electro house style. Despite this, Mood Melodies returned to co-production with Walker on his song "Hello World", which was released in March 2022.

== Songwriting and production credits ==
Title	Year	Artist(s)	Album	Credits	Written with	Produced with
"Conquer the World" (featuring Brandy)	2013	Jessie J	Alive	Co-writer	Jessica Cornish, Claude Kelly, Jonathan Webb Jr., Jamil Debardlabon, Are Sorkness	-
"Drifter"	2014	Karmin	Pulses	Co-writer	Amy Heidemann, Nicholas Noonan, Jonathan Webb Jr.	-
"Play My Drum"	2015	Sandra Lyng	Non-album single	Co-writer/Producer	Sandra Lyng, Elias Kapari, Gunnar Greve, Touraj Keshtkar	-
"Night After Night"	2015	Sandra Lyng	Non-album single	Co-writer/Producer	Sandra Lyng, Jesper Borgen	Jesper Borgen
"Faded"	2015	Alan Walker	Faded Japan EP	Co-writer/Producer	Alan Walker, Jesper Borgen, Gunnar Greve	Alan Walker, Jesper Borgen
"Moonrise"	2016	Sandra Lyng	Non-album single	Co-writer/Producer	Sandra Lyng, Gunnar Greve, Frida Amudsen	-
"Sing Me to Sleep"	2016	Alan Walker	Faded Japan EP	Co-writer/Producer	Alan Walker, Jesper Borgen, Gunnar Greve, Thomas La Verdi	Alan Walker, Jesper Borgen
"Alone"	2016	Alan Walker	Faded Japan EP	Co-writer/Producer	Alan Walker, Jesper Borgen, Gunnar Greve, Jonnali Parmenius	Alan Walker
"Back to Beautiful"	2017	Sofia Carson	Non-album single	Co-writer/Producer	Sofia Carson, Julia Michaels, Mikkel Eriksen, Tor Hermansen, Justin Tranter, Alan Walker, Jesper Borgen, Gunnar Greve	Alan Walker, StarGate, Tim Blacksmith, Danny D
"Stay" (with Alessia Cara)	2017	Zedd	Non-album single	Co-writer	Anton Zaslavski, Jonnali Parmenius, Linus Wiklund, Sarah Aarons, Alessia Caracciolo	-
"Tired" (featuring Gavin James)	2017	Alan Walker	Faded Japan EP	Co-writer/Producer	Alan Walker, Gunnar Greve, Fredrik Borch Olsen, Lars Rosness, Marcus Arnbekk, Gavin Wigglesworth, Ollie Green, Mike Needle, Daniel Bryer	Alan Walker, Gunnar Greve, Fredrik Olsen, Lars Rosness, Marcus Arnbekk, Carl Hovind
"The Spectre"	2017	Alan Walker	Faded Japan EP	Co-writer/Producer	Alan Walker, Jesper Borgen, Lars Rosness, Marcus Arnbekk, Gunnar Greve, Thomas La Verdi	Alan Walker, Lars Rosness, Marcus Arnbekk, Gunnar Greve, Fredrik Olsen
"All Falls Down" (featuring Noah Cyrus and Digital Farm Animals)	2017	Alan Walker	Different World	Co-writer/Producer	Alan Walker, Richard Boardman, Pablo Bowman, Sarah Blanchard, Daniel Boyle, Nicholas Gale	Alan Walker, The Six, Chris "Tek" O'Ryan, Gunnar Greve, Jenna Andrews, Alex Holmberg
"Darkside" (featuring Au/Ra and Tomine Harket)	2018	Alan Walker	Different World	Co-writer/Producer	Alan Walker, Jesper Borgen, Lars Rosness, Marcus Arnbekk, Fredrik Borch Olsen, Gunnar Greve, Thomas La Verdi, Atle Petterson, William Wiik Larsen, Jamie Stenzel, Andrew Frampton	Alan Walker, Fredrik Olsen, Gunnar Greve, Jesper Borgen, Mere Music
"Diamond Heart" (featuring Sophia Somajo)	2018	Alan Walker	Different World	Co-writer/Producer	Alan Walker, Thomas Troelsen, Kristoffer Haugen, Edvard Normann, Gunnar Greve, Yann Bargain, Victor Verpillat, Fredrik Borch Olsen, Sophia Somajo	Alan Walker, Yann Bargain, Victor Verpillat, Jesper Borgen, James Njie, Gunnar Greve, Big Fred, STATE
