= Sing Me to Sleep =

2016 song by Alan Walker

Single by Alan Walker
- Released: 3 June 2016
- Recorded: 2016
- Genre: Electro house
- Length: 3:09
- Label: Mer Musikk Sony
- Songwriters: Alan Walker; Iselin Solheim; Jesper Borgen; Anders Frøen; Gunnar Greve Pettersen; Thomas La Verdi; Magnus Bertelsen
- Producers: Alan Walker; Jesper Borgen; Mood Melodies

Alan Walker singles chronology
"Faded" (2015)	"Sing Me to Sleep" (2016)	"Routine" (2016)

Audio sample
- "Sing Me to Sleep": file; help

Music video
- "Sing Me to Sleep" on YouTube

"Sing Me to Sleep" is a song by Norwegian DJ and record producer Alan Walker. Incorporating uncredited vocals provided by Norwegian singer Iselin Solheim (who previously provided uncredited vocals on Walker's song "Faded"), it was released commercially for digital consumption on 3 June 2016. Upon release, the song received positive reviews from music critics, with several positively comparing it to "Faded".

== Music video ==
An accompanying music video for the single was shot in Hong Kong. It was released on 2 June 2016 to Walker's YouTube channel.

== Track listing ==
Digital download
No.	Title	Length
1.	"Sing Me to Sleep"	3:09
2.	"Sing Me to Sleep" (Instrumental)	3:10

Digital download
No.	Title	Length
1.	"Sing Me to Sleep"	3:09
2.	"Sing Me to Sleep" (Instrumental)	3:09
3.	"Sing Me To Sleep" (Marshmello Remix)	3:12

Digital download – Marshmello Remix
No.	Title	Length
1.	"Sing Me to Sleep" (Marshmello Remix)	3:12

Digital download – Burak Yeter Remix
No.	Title	Length
1.	"Sing Me to Sleep" (Burak Yeter Remix)	3:31

== Charts ==
=== Weekly charts ===
Weekly chart performance for "Sing Me to Sleep"
Chart (2016)	Peak position
Australia (ARIA)	126
Austria (Ö3 Austria Top 40)	4
Belgium (Ultratip Bubbling Under Wallonia)	21
Czech Republic Singles Digital (ČNS IFPI)	48
Czech Republic Airplay (ČNS IFPI)	1
Finland (Suomen virallinen lista)	4
France (SNEP)	51
Germany (GfK)	10
Hungary (Single Top 40)	8
Lebanon (Lebanese Top 20)	6
Netherlands (Global Top 40)	37
Netherlands (Single Tip)	5
Netherlands (Tipparade)	10
Norway (VG-lista)	1
Poland Airplay (ZPAV)	11
Russia Airplay (TopHit 100)	3
Slovakia Singles Digital (ČNS IFPI)	20
Slovenia Airplay (SloTop50)	15
Spain (Promusicae)	43
Sweden (Sverigetopplistan)	9
Switzerland (Schweizer Hitparade)	14
Switzerland (Media Control Romandy)	7
UK Singles (Official Charts)	95
US Hot Dance/Electronic Songs (Billboard)	18

2023 weekly chart performance
Chart (2023)	Peak position
Finland Airplay (Radiosoittolista)	54

=== Year-end charts ===
Year-end chart rankings for "Sing Me to Sleep"
Chart (2016)	Position
Austria (Ö3 Austria Top 40)	26
Germany (Official German Charts)	51
Hungary (Single Top 40)	56
Netherlands (Global Top 40)	95
Sweden (Schweizer Hitparade)	52
Switzerland (Schweizer Hitparade)	47
US Hot Dance/Electronic Songs (Billboard)	49

== Certifications ==
Region	Certification	Certified units/sales
Australia (ARIA)	Gold	35,000^{‡}
Austria (IFPI Austria)	Platinum	30,000^{‡}
Canada (Music Canada)	Gold	40,000^{‡}
Denmark (IFPI Danmark)	Gold	45,000^{‡}
France (SNEP)	Gold	100,000^{‡}
Germany (BVMI)	Platinum	400,000^{‡}
Italy (FIMI)	Gold	25,000^{‡}
Mexico (AMPROFON)	2× Platinum+Gold	150,000^{‡}
New Zealand (RMNZ)	Gold	15,000^{‡}
Norway (IFPI Norway)	6× Platinum	240,000^{‡}
Poland (ZPAV)	Diamond	100,000^{‡}
Switzerland (IFPI Switzerland)	Platinum	30,000^{‡}
United Kingdom (BPI)	Silver	200,000^{‡}
United States (RIAA)	Gold	500,000^{‡}
Streaming
Sweden (GLF)	4× Platinum	32,000,000^{†}
^{‡} Sales+streaming figures based on certification alone.^{†} Streaming-only figures based on certification alone.

== Release history ==
Country	Date	Version	Format	Label	Ref.
Various	29 May 2016	Marshmello remix	Digital download	Mer Musikk	
Various	3 June 2016	Original	Digital download	Mer Musikk	
Various	3 June 2016	Single	Digital download	Mer Musikk	
Russia	3 February 2017	Burak Yeter remix	Digital download	Sony Music Russia	
