= Gunnar Greve =

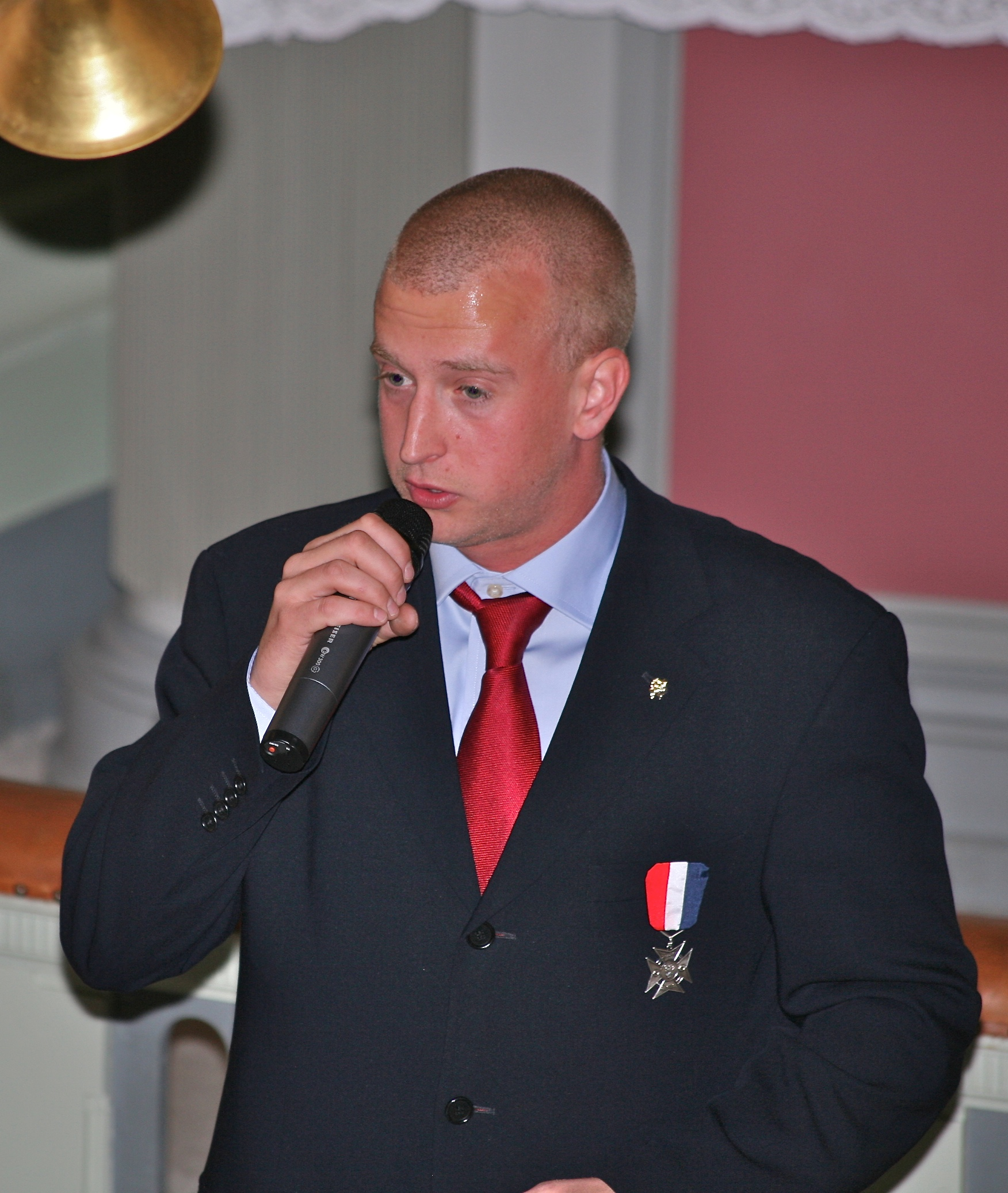

Background information
- Born: Gunnar Greve Pettersen; March 9, 1982 (age 44); Bergen, Norway
- Genres: Pop, EDM, R&B, hip hop
- Occupations: Talent manager, producer, singer, songwriter, record executive
- Years active: 1996 – present
- Label: Kreatell
- Website: www.mer.as

Gunnar Greve Pettersen (born 9 March 1982) is a Norwegian talent manager, producer, singer, songwriter and record executive. Greve is one of the most well-known figures in the Norwegian industry, primarily known for representing a variety of Norwegian and Swedish artists, producers and songwriters. He is the founder and current managing partner of Norwegian full-service music company Kreatell (which he co-founded in 2012, formerly MER), representing artists such as Alan Walker.

== Career ==
Greve began his career in the music industry in the mid 1990s, when he established the Norwegian hip hop group Spetakkel. The group went on to release two full-length studio albums and two EP's, before reaching their end. Greve went on to pursue his solo career under the moniker Gest, with the release of his solo-debut I Grevens Tid in 2007.

Since then, Greve has filled numerous roles in the Norwegian music industry, primarily known for representing a number of Norwegian and Swedish artists such as Kaveh, Tommy Tee, Lars Vaular, Vinni and Timbuktu. He has also served as a judge on the Norwegian Idol for five seasons.

In late 2012, Greve founded MER, a full-service music company in which he is the managing partner. The company offers management, booking, promotion and label functions.

In 2015, Greve signed 18 year old artist, DJ and producer Alan Walker to MER. Walker released his debut single "Faded" (co-written by Greve) in late 2015. The single was certified platinum and gold in a total of 23 countries, and entered the Billboard Hot 100.

In June 2016, Walker released his follow-up single "Sing Me to Sleep" (also co-written by Gunnar Greve). In October 2016, Gunnar Greve signed a publishing deal with Sony/ATV Music Publishing / Stellar Songs Ltd.

Today, Greve works actively as an A&R, manager and songwriter for artists, producers and songwriters such as Alan Walker, Paperboys and Mood Melodies.

== Chronology ==
=== 2001–2008 ===
- Recording artist with rap group Spetakkel and as a solo artist. Released a total of three albums, two EP's and various compilations/collaborations.

=== 2009–2012 ===
- Co-founder and artist manager at management company MADE in Bergen, Norway. During this period, Greve represented artists Lars Vaular, Timbuktu, Tommy Tee and Paperboys.

=== 2012–present ===
- Left MADE to establish full-service music company MER, with a talent roster including above-mentioned Lars Vaular, Timbuktu, Tommy Tee and Paperboys, in addition to artists Kaveh and Sandra Lyng, Alan Walker, Paperboys, Mood Melodies, Cezinando and Jesper Borgen.

== Awards and nominations ==
=== 2009 ===
- Lars Vaular - D'e Glede (studio album) - nominated for a Norwegian Grammy award
- Tommy Tee - Studio Time (studio album) - awarded a Norwegian Grammy award

=== 2010 ===
- Lars Vaular - Helt Om Natten, Helt Om Dagen (studio album) - awarded a Norwegian Grammy award, out of four nominations.

=== 2011 ===
- Lars Vaular - Du Betyr Meg (studio album) - awarded two Norwegian Grammy awards, out of four nominations.
- Timbuktu - Sagolandet (studio album) - awarded a Swedish Grammy award

=== 2012 ===
- Vinni - Sommerfuggel i Vinterland (single) - nominated for a Norwegian Grammy award

=== 2013 ===
- Lars Vaular - 1001 Hjem (studio album) - nominated for two Norwegian Grammy awards
- Don Martin - En gang Romsåsgutt alltid Romsåsgutt - awarded a Norwegian Grammy award
- Kaveh - Hjertet Kommer Først - nominated for a Norwegian Grammy award
