= Sway Tour =

2018 concert tour by Tove Styrke

- Tour by Tove Styrke
- Promotional poster for the Nordic shows
- Location: North America; Europe
- Associated album: Sway
- Start date: 29 September 2018
- End date: 15 December 2018
- Legs: 2
- No. of shows: 32

Tove Styrke concert chronology
- North American tour (2015); Sway Tour (2018); Hard Tour (2022–23)

The Sway Tour was a concert tour by Swedish singer Tove Styrke, undertaken in support of her third studio album, Sway (2018). Before commencing the tour, Styrke opened for Lorde and Katy Perry on their respective arena tours in the spring of 2018. She then performed sets at several music festivals in the Nordic countries during the summer. The Sway Tour visited club venues and lasted 32 shows in North America and Europe. It began in September 2018 in Toronto, Canada, followed by dates in the United States, England, and the Nordic countries. The tour concluded in December 2018 in Stockholm, Sweden.

The set list consisted of songs from Sway and Styrke's second studio album Kiddo (2015). She also performed collaborations and a cover version of Lorde's "Liability". As with the album, the tour had an overarching rose theme and the singer handed out roses to the audience during the performances. The show received general acclaim from critics, who complimented Styrke's stage presence in addition to technical aspects such as the set design and lighting. Au/Ra, Emily Burns, and Grant served as the supporting acts for the tour.

== Background ==
On 26 June 2018, Sony Music issued a press release announcing Tove Styrke's headlining tour to support her third studio album Sway (2018). The announcement revealed the tour, titled the Sway Tour, would visit North America and England, commencing on 29 September in Toronto and ending on 2 November in London. On 3 September 2018, the Nordic part of the tour was announced to begin on 23 November in Karlstad and end on 15 December in Stockholm. It marked her first tour of the year as a headliner.

Prior to the Sway Tour, Styrke had performed across North America and Europe; she supported Lorde on the Melodrama World Tour in North America and then joined Katy Perry as the opening act for several European dates of Witness: The Tour, during which she previewed material from the then-forthcoming Sway. Styrke then performed two headline shows in Sydney and Melbourne in April 2018. In mid-June, she did a show in a London club to celebrate the release of Sway, followed by 12 festival appearances across the Nordic countries from June to September. These appearances included Peace & Love in Borlänge, Ruisrock in Turku, and Stavernfestivalen in Stavern in July, followed by Malmöfestivalen in Malmö and Kulturkalaset in Gothenburg the following month. She finished her festival concerts with a set at Popaganda in Stockholm in September. Her festival sets were widely praised by critics.

== Development ==
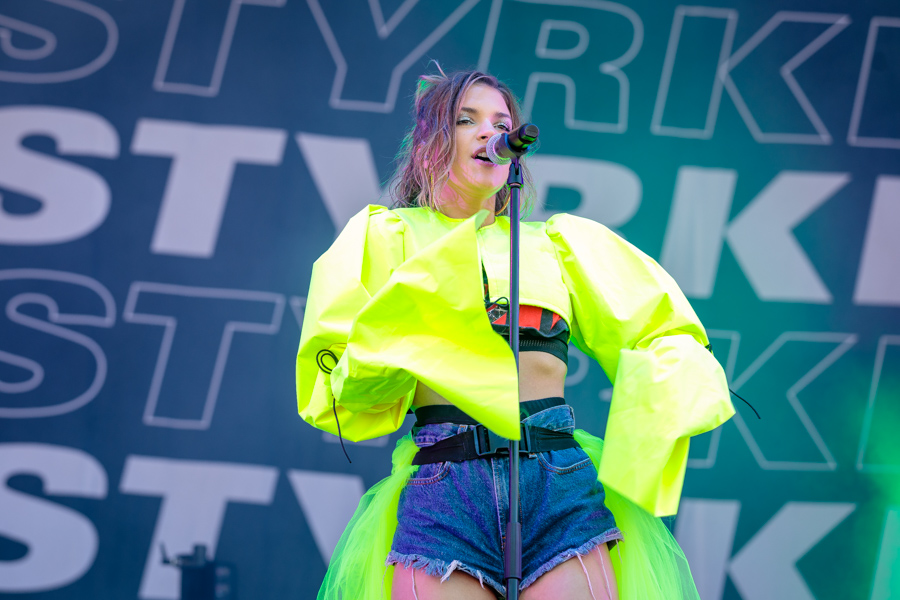
Styrke performing at Stavernfestivalen in July 2018 prior to starting the tour

Unlike Styrke's arena shows with Lorde and Perry earlier in 2018, the Sway Tour visited club venues. She stated that she learned a lot from being part of "giant tours" and that performing at larger versus smaller venues was different yet similar. She said, "You want to make the arena feel small and intimate ... While you want to make the club stage feel big." For the tour, Styrke performed all nine songs from Sway. While working on the album, she had a minimalistic approach to the production. On transitioning the studio versions to the stage, she felt that it was a "completely different world", explaining to Nya Wermlands-Tidningen that the instrumentals play a larger role when performing live. She stated that the title track "Sway" was the song that "worked the best" on tour, calling it the "anthem" of the album. The set list also included three songs from Styrke's second studio album Kiddo (2015) as well as three collaborative efforts originally performed with other artists.

Styrke carried on the rose imagery and theme from the Sway album onto the tour. In preparation for the shows in Sweden, Styrke told Norrbottens-Kuriren that the shorter travel distances between venues would allow her to bring "more stuff", stating that the shows would be "bigger" and include "more roses" compared to the North American and English shows. She described the stage design as an "art form in itself", telling Västerbottens Folkblad that "It is a way of translating the music to the stage and creating a world that the music can live in." In an interview for Skånska Dagbladet, Styrke elaborated on the tour's theme: "It's the Sway Tour so it's very much like stepping into the world of the album, then I mix in different collaborations that I've done and some older songs. These are very fun shows with a lot of warmth. It feels like such a free space because I have created it myself, there is nowhere I feel more like myself than on stage."

Styrke was joined by different opening acts for the duration of the tour. Au/Ra was the supporting performer for the North American shows, while Emily Burns opened the concerts in England. Swedish singer Grant was the opening act in the Nordics, excluding the show in Helsinki. Before the tour, Grant opened for Styrke during her one-off show in London in June 2018. After the show, the two hung out and eventually decided Grant would join on tour in the fall. Grant released a cover version of Styrke's song "Changed My Mind" on the same date the Nordic part of the tour began. She also performed the cover as part of her set. While the tour was underway, Styrke released three episodes of a YouTube series titled Tove Styrke & Grant, where the singers socialized and played drinking games.

== Concert synopsis ==
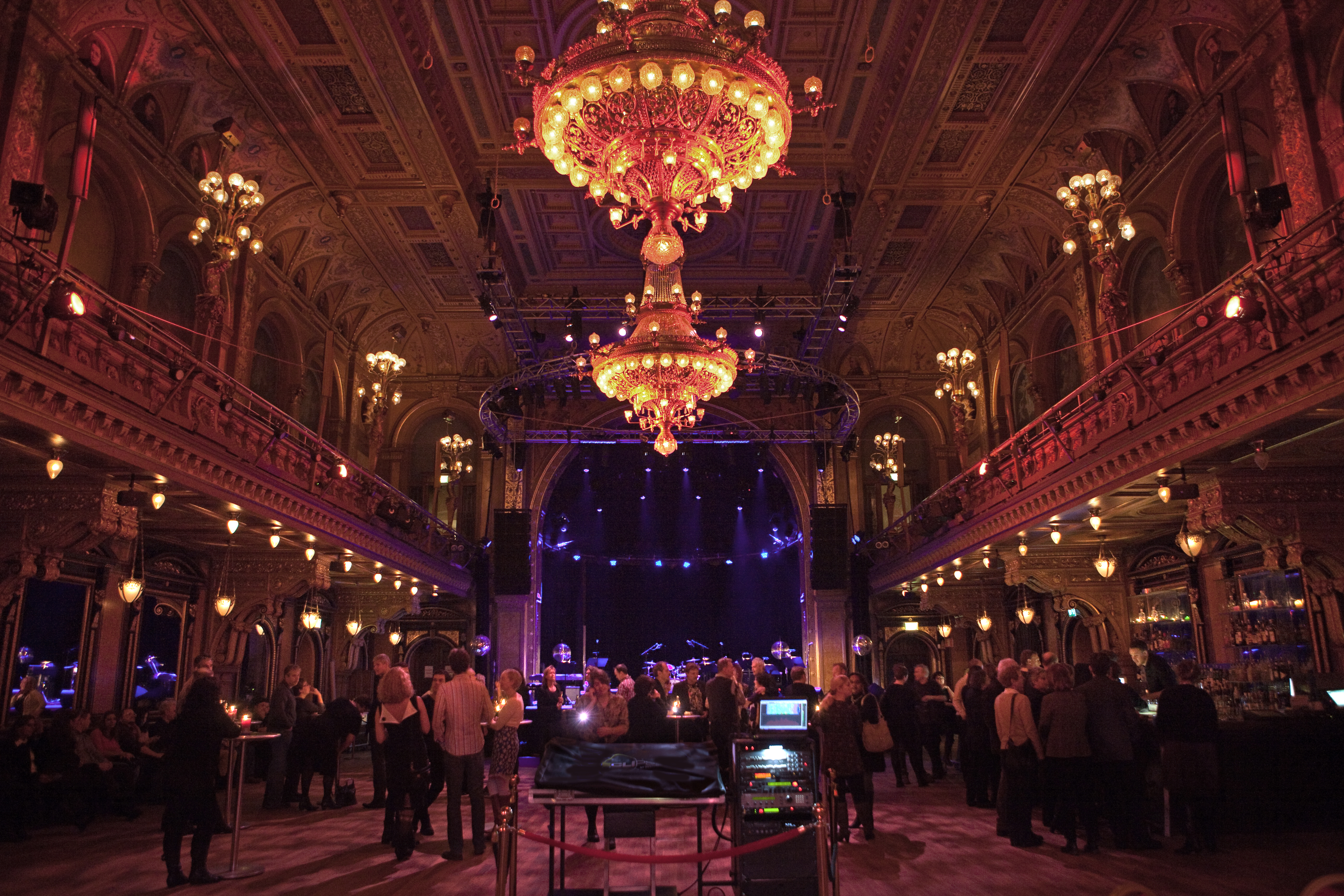
The final show of the Sway Tour was held at Berns Salonger in Stockholm.

The concert consisted of a main show and an encore. The stage design included white lights in the shape of roses arranged in rows on the stage floor and minimal overhead lighting. The lights changed colour according to the music, and began to flash when Styrke entered the stage. She was accompanied by two band members, Johannes Runemark and Sanna Sikborn Erixon, on keyboards, guitars, and percussion. Styrke performed in the center of the stage, while the musicians appeared in the back and to the sides.

The main show began with the performance of "Borderline", after which Styrke greeted the crowd and introduced herself. The next song was "Mistakes", for which the lights alternated turning on and off during the pauses in the music. While illuminated, the strobe lights captured Styrke in different poses. After concluding "Ego", Styrke performed "On a Level" with similar lighting effects as those during "Mistakes". After that the stage went dark and she began her cover version of Lorde's 2017 song "Liability", which she told the crowd was "one of [her] favorite songs in the entire world". Next she performed "I Lied" with vocoder-manipulated vocals. She held out her microphone and let the crowd sing along during the chorus. This was followed by "On the Low".

The second half of the concert began with a solo performance of her Alma collaboration "Good Vibes". During Scandinavian concerts, tour opener Grant joined Styrke on stage to perform the song. Styrke then performed her VAX collaboration "Endless", before "Changed My Mind" and "Say My Name", which she encouraged the crowd to sing along with her. The main show concluded with a performance of "Sway", during which she threw roses out to the audience. She then thanked the crowd for coming to the show before leaving the stage. A few minutes later, she returned for the encore. She performed a guitar-based version of her NOTD collaboration "Been There Done That" and then closed the show with "Number One". For the European shows, "Been There Done That" was replaced by an acoustic rendition of "Vibe", which had been released a few days prior to the first date of the leg. The set lasted approximately 55 minutes in total.

== Critical reception ==
The Sway Tour received praise from most critics, with Styrke's stage presence being highlighted in several reviews. Linnea Eriksson of Nya Wermlands-Tidningen wrote that "Tove Styrke carries the songs with a strong stage presence and the radiance of a superstar. She's as cool as Robyn and as cocky as Madonna." The writer also appreciated her personal interactions with the audience between songs. Similarly, Margeaux Sippell of Variety described the singer as a "ball of pure energy", noting her "strong" stage presence. Ralph Bretzer, writing for Skånska Dagbladet, asserted that the singer "really takes the audience in" throughout the "charming and driven" set". Norrbottens-Kuriren's Emma Isberg also felt the crowd was Styrke's main focus throughout the show, which the writer considered an appropriate mixture of musical performances and audience interactions. Henrik Lång from Västerbottens-Kuriren wrote positively of Styrke's live vocals and viewed the set as a showcase in "intricate melodic pop" with both dancehall elements and chorus-driven electronic music.

A number of critics approved of the stage design, decor, and technical details. Eriksson wrote, "The stage decor is the prettiest I've seen on the Nöjesfabriken stage. Roses grow out of the stage floor in straight rows. They blink and glow in different colors, creating a digital feel. It's like every flower is a big pixel on a screen." Isberg deemed the show "well thought out" and emphasized the lighting and stage decorations that supplied a "world of their own on stage". Lång also commended the show's visuals, in particular directing praise at the lighting, which he called "tasteful". Likewise, Värmlands Folkblad critic Sigrid Josefsson described the lighting as "cool". Melinda Reyes Hiltunen, whose review appeared in Norrköpings Tidningar, regarded the distribution of roses as an innovative way to end the show.

Some reviewers had mixed responses to different aspects of the tour. Bretzer's only critique was the lack of interplay between Styrke and the show's live musicians. Jonathan Bengtsson, writing for Göteborgs-Posten, applauded her dedication and energy, but disliked the show's short length as well as the scheduling on a weeknight. Hannes Grönberg from Sydsvenskan noted her showmanship on stage and concluded that the singer was "really only hindered by her weak singing voice". Due to the poor crowd turnout at the Karlstad show, Josefsson wrote that the gig lacked a sense of direction. While complimenting crowd-pleasers such as "Say My Name" and "Liability", Josefsson felt the show as a whole was "lukewarm".

== Opening acts ==
- Au/Ra (North America)
- Emily Burns (England)
- Grant (Scandinavia)
- New Ro (Finland)

== Set list ==
This set list is from the show on 15 October 2018 in Los Angeles. It may not represent all concerts for the duration of the tour.

1. "Borderline"
2. "Mistakes"
3. "Ego"
4. "On a Level"
5. "Liability"
6. "I Lied"
7. "On the Low"
8. "Good Vibes"
9. "Endless"
10. "Changed My Mind"
11. "Say My Name"
12. "Sway"

Encore

13. "Been There Done That"
14. "Number One"

Notes

- "Vibe" replaced "Been There Done That" starting with the European leg.
- "Good Vibes" was performed with Grant during Scandinavian shows.

== Shows ==
List of North American concerts
Date (2018)	City	Country	Venue
29 September	Toronto	Canada	Velvet Underground
1 October	Washington, D.C.	United States	Rock & Roll Hotel
3 October	New York City	United States	(Le) Poisson Rouge
5 October	Boston	United States	Cafe 939
6 October	Philadelphia	United States	Boot & Saddle
9 October	Chicago	United States	Chop Shop
10 October	Saint Paul	United States	Amsterdam Bar & Grill
12 October	Denver	United States	Larimer Lounge
13 October	Salt Lake City	United States	In the Venue
15 October	Los Angeles	United States	Belasco Theatre
17 October	San Francisco	United States	Cafe Du Nord
19 October	Portland	United States	Holocene
20 October	Vancouver	Canada	The Biltmore Cabaret
21 October	Seattle	United States	The Crocodile

List of European concerts
Date (2018)	City	Country	Venue
28 October	Bristol	England	The Fleece
29 October	Manchester	England	Night & Day
30 October	Brighton	England	Patterns
1 November	Birmingham	England	O2 Institute 3
2 November	London	England	Heaven
23 November	Karlstad	Sweden	Nöjesfabriken
24 November	Norrköping	Sweden	Arbis Bar & Salonger
25 November	Uppsala	Sweden	Uppsala Konsert & Kongress
28 November	Helsinki	Finland	Tavastia
30 November	Lund	Sweden	Mejeriet
1 December	Linköping	Sweden	Konsert & Kongress
5 December	Oslo	Norway	Parkteatret
6 December	Gothenburg	Sweden	Pustervik
7 December	Umeå	Sweden	Väven
8 December	Luleå	Sweden	Kulturens Hus
13 December	Copenhagen	Denmark	Vega
14 December	Malmö	Sweden	KB
15 December	Stockholm	Sweden	Berns
