= Sway (Tove Styrke song) =

2018 single by Tove Styrke

Single by Tove Styrke

from the album Sway
- Released: 2 May 2018
- Genre: Pop
- Length: 3:30
- Label: Sony Music
- Songwriter(s): Tove Styrke; Joe Janiak; Mozella
- Producer(s): Joe Janiak; Elof Loelv (co)

Tove Styrke singles chronology
"On the Low" (2018)	"Sway" (2018)	"Stuck" (2018)

"Sway" is a song by Swedish singer Tove Styrke from her third studio album, Sway (2018). Styrke wrote the song with Joe Janiak and Mozella in Los Angeles. Janiak handled the production with Elof Loelv as co-producer. It was previewed by Styrke while touring with Lorde in the spring of 2018. Sony Music released the song as the album's fifth single on 2 May 2018, two days before the album. Musically, "Sway" is a pop song with electronica influences. Described by Styrke as a love story, the song's lyrics speak of an infatuation and the different feelings associated with it.

"Sway" received positive reviews from music critics, some of whom highlighted it as one of the best tracks on the album. Upon its release, the song appeared below the top 100 of the Sverigetopplistan singles chart, reaching number four on the Heatseeker chart. The Joanna Nordahl-directed music video depicting a queer romance between two skaters earned critical praise and a Grammis nomination. Styrke has performed the song live on numerous occasions, including the Sway Tour (2018).

== Background and release ==
While composing her third studio album Sway (2018), Tove Styrke aimed to create "clean and simple" yet interesting songs. She collaborated with producer Elof Loelv on most of the album tracks in Stockholm, and also worked with British musician Joe Janiak during her stay in Los Angeles. She stated that visiting the city was a refreshing change of environment after working in Stockholm for a year and a half. The sessions with Janiak resulted in the creation of two songs, the title track "Sway" and "On a Level". On working with Janiak, she told 7digital, "He's a really good writer and he comes up with creative ideas that are fun for me. And me being very meticulous it's good to have someone who's not that meticulous and more of a 'feeling' person." The two co-wrote "Sway" with American songwriter Mozella, and Janiak produced the track with Loelv as co-producer. Henrik Edenhed mixed the track and Randy Merrill handled mastering.

In an interview for Billboard, Styrke explained that she intended to open the album with "Sway" and position "On a Level" as the final track. She said, "[T]hey've got something in common, in terms of being bigger than many of the other songs. But it's big in another sense. It's more nighttime, it's a little bit more tight in how it sounds, and a little bit romantic." She described "Sway" as her favorite album track in terms of the emotion it conveys, "It's so sweet. I'm obsessed with it ... 'Sway' is not just the title track; it represents the whole album so well." She previewed the song in concert prior to its official release while supporting Lorde on the Melodrama World Tour in the spring of 2018. The song was digitally released on 2 May 2018 through Sony Music, two days ahead of the album's release. The song was added for airplay on Swedish radio stations on 9 May 2018.

== Composition and lyrics ==
"Sway"
An excerpt from the song, showcasing parts of the chorus and the beginning of the second verse with Styrke's fast-paced staccato vocals.

"Sway" is a three-minute and 30-second uptempo pop song with elements of electronica. It features instrumentation provided by drums and handclaps, and begins with the sound of a drink can cracking open. In an interview for Värmlands Folkblad, Styrke characterized the sound of the song as "big" despite the minimal production with few components. According to Owen Myers of The Fader, Styrke uses a double-time vocal delivery. Hannah Mylrea of NME classified her vocals as staccato, while Pitchfork's Margaret Farrell wrote that she pauses "to catch her breath between vowels".

Styrke referred to "Sway" as a "very romantic" love story. The lyrics of the song illustrate the protagonist singing to a potential love interest. i-D writer Ivan Guzman, who coined the track an "elated head rush of a song", wrote that its lyrics express the "mixture of anxiety and euphoria that comes with ripping off the band-aid and just kissing your crush". Styrke told Dagens Nyheter that the song is about a friendship that is disrupted by romantic feelings and the subsequent uncertainty of where the relationship might lead. Farrell noted the piece as a "nervous stream of consciousness more than a mating call, capturing the anxiety of being forced to read a vibe". In the pre-chorus, Styrke sings, "I don't see nothing wrong with you and me getting along." She defined the feelings as either "anti-romantic" or "super romantic" and stated that they occupy one's mind no matter how strong.

Styrke based "Sway" on a specific night when she fell in love, although she had experienced similar emotions numerous times before. In a story for Paper, she recounted the feeling as "only exist[ing] now, in a flow, with a person and nothing up to that moment or after it matters". The lyrics were influenced by the variety of thoughts that can cross one's mind on such a night. She described it as amplifying newly-found private emotions and turning them into an almost anthemic expression. In the chorus, she proclaims, "Sway with me. Don't speak, stay with me." Regarding this sentiment, she elaborated, "'Sway with me' is like saying 'exist with me' in a way. Move through these feelings with me, flow with me, sway with me."

== Reception ==
"Sway" was met with general praise from music critics. At the time of its release, Jacob Moore of Pigeons & Planes called it a "sweeping, feel-good take on love" and selected it as one of the "Best Songs of the Week". Moore asserted, "Styrke is perfectly capable of writing immediate, insanely catchy pop songs, but she consistently pushes her music into interesting new territory." Renowned for Sound writer Francesca Lamaina applauded Styrke's vocal and songwriting abilities throughout Sway's "eight extraordinary songs". In connection with this, Lamaina deemed the title track a "fast-paced, romantic and playful" song and named it "the perfect opener" for the album. Mylrea, writing for NME, lauded the track as "expertly crafted", and Simon Österhof of Västerbottens-Kuriren called it "fantastic".

In a review for Pitchfork, Farrell observed that Styrke's vocal range had expanded considerably on the album, resulting in a more daring and playful sound. Farrell specifically pointed to "Sway", which the writer described as a "woozy, seductive overture" where her "voice maneuvers around come-ons like an ice cube melting through hot fingers". Markus Larsson from Aftonbladet regarded the song as one of the best efforts of the album along with lead single "Say My Name". Similarly, Idolator's Matt Nied picked "Sway" as a standout track while writing, "Emerging as a highlight on an already hit-filled tracklist, this could easily dominate the charts." In a lukewarm review in Nya Wermlands-Tidningen, Mas Karin Gustafsson stated that the song and "On the Low" blend into each other due to the "cool" approach of other album tracks.

Adam Graham of The Detroit News selected "Sway" as the ninth-best-single of 2018, writing that "Swedish pop singer Tove Styrke flows like Migos on this pop jam that's stickier than flypaper". Joakim Almén of Café picked it as the 22nd-best-song of 2018, calling it one of the most distinguished pop songs of the year. Commercially, "Sway" became the second of Sway's singles to miss the top 100 of the Sverigetopplistan singles chart, after "On the Low". The single debuted and peaked at number four on the Heatseeker chart on 11 May 2018.

== Music video ==
Joanna Nordahl directed the music video for "Sway". She also directed the video for the album's second single "Mistakes". Styrke appointed Nordahl as the visual creative director for Sway, as she believed it was crucial to collaborate with a female director who shared her perspectives and understood her vision. While conceptualizing the video treatment, Nordahl drew inspiration from Styrke's description of the album as a "collection of love stories" from varying viewpoints. Having contemplated a skateboard-themed film for some years, she identified an ideal match for the song when Styrke played it to her. She told Paper, "The flow and movement in the song really reminded me of warm summer nights, skating, and the sense of empowerment and freedom that I associate with that, so it felt like a perfect match."

Nordahl disclosed that the biggest challenge was ensuring the video's authenticity and respect for skateboarding culture. She elaborated, "[C]asting real skaters/non-actors was crucial, but of course also meant that the casting process was going to be hard. Young London skaters are not known for their love of appearing in pop videos." Several weeks of unsuccessful screen testing and searching made Nordahl consider changing the entire concept, until skaters and real-life best friends Arran Horton and Bailey Marklew were cast in the lead roles. Marklew caught her attention while he was skating past her on the street. He was passionate about filmmaking and understood her vision, and then introduced her to Horton. Styrke told Instinct that some of the footage used in the video were shot by Horton and Marklew themselves. Kikki Strupat and Shaun Rhodes briefly appear as a couple in the video. Tim Lorentzén was the cinematographer and Khuram Mirza was the producer.

Shot on location in London, the video for "Sway" is a documentary-style depiction of a queer romance between two skaters. Nordahl aimed to create a relatable narrative in an "unexpected" setting and capture an authentic bond between two individuals. She recognized the significance of representing queer stories and believed that a music video was a suitable medium to convey the message. She said that the relationship between the two skaters can be interpreted in different ways by different viewers as some may see them as a couple, while others may see them as friends or lovers. However, she believed all interpretations of the characters were equally valuable. Styrke commented that the video effectively captures the feeling she was aiming for when she wrote the song.

The video premiered on 21 May 2018 via Styrke's official YouTube channel. The video commences with the two skaters at a skatepark during the day. As the first chorus sets in, the scene transitions to the streets of London at night, where they continue to skate. After the second chorus, the music pauses, and they relax in an apartment while smoking and drinking water. The music resumes as they share a passionate kiss. Later, they are shown dancing in an underground club where Styrke is performing. This is interspersed with various shots of the actors' real-life footage of their friendship over the years. The visual was met with critical praise; Guzman of i-D declared it "stunning", and Lindsay Howard of Variance deemed it "simply perfect". Nöjesguiden named the music video the ninth-best of 2018. In 2019, the visual earned Styrke and Nordahl a Grammis nomination in the category Music Video of the Year.

== Live performances ==
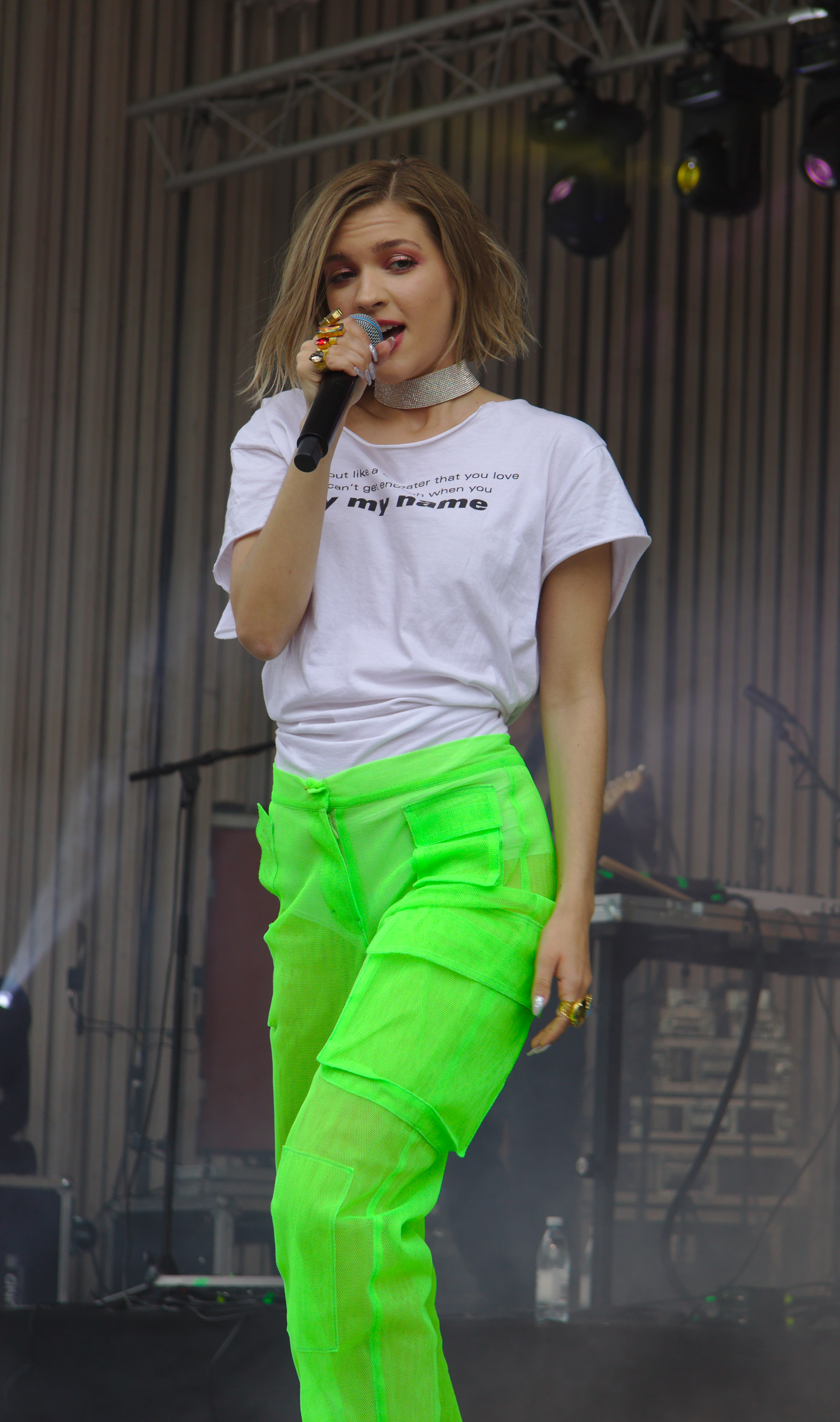
Styrke performing at Pride in Växjö in May 2018

Prior to the song's commercial release, Styrke performed "Sway" while opening for Lorde on North American dates of the Melodrama World Tour in the spring of 2018, and later while supporting Katy Perry on Witness: The Tour in Europe. Styrke did a televised performance of the song on the TV4 morning show Nyhetsmorgon on 6 May 2018, followed by a rendition on SVT1's Allsång på Skansen on 31 July 2018. She sang the song live during a Pride celebration in Växjö on 12 May 2018. She later performed it at various music festivals throughout the summer.

The song was part of her set list on the Sway Tour during the fall of 2018. Styrke stated that it "worked the best" out of the album's songs on tour, dubbing it as the album's "anthem". During the main part of the show, "Sway" was the final song performed before the encore. Styrke concluded the performance by throwing roses to the audience. In a review of the show, Melinda Reyes Hiltunen from Norrköpings Tidningar lauded the distribution of roses as an innovative end to the show. In December 2018, Styrke presented a live acoustic version of the song on Musikhjälpen, held in Lund. She also performed the song on the Hard Tour (2022–23).

== Credits and personnel ==
Credits are adapted from the Sway liner notes and Tidal.

- Tove Styrke – songwriting
- Joe Janiak – songwriting, production
- Mozella – songwriting
- Elof Loelv – co-production, programming
- Henrik Edenhed – mixing
- Randy Merrill – mastering

== Charts ==
Chart performance for "Sway"
Chart (2018)	Peak position
Sweden Heatseeker (Sverigetopplistan)	4

== Release history ==
Release dates and formats for "Sway"
Country	Date	Format(s)	Label	Ref.
Various	2 May 2018	Digital download; streaming	Sony Music	
Sweden	9 May 2018	Radio airplay	Sony Music	
