= On the Low =

2018 single by Tove Styrke

Single by Tove Styrke

from the album Sway
- Released: 6 April 2018
- Genre: Pop
- Length: 3:46
- Label: Sony Music
- Songwriters: Tove Styrke; Elof Loelv
- Producer: Elof Loelv

Tove Styrke singles chronology
"Endless" (2018)	"On the Low" (2018)	"Sway" (2018)

"On the Low" is a song by Swedish singer Tove Styrke from her third studio album, Sway (2018). Styrke wrote the song with Elof Loelv, who handled the production. It stood as one of the first songs written for the album and was previewed by Styrke while touring in the fall of 2017. The song was released as the album's fourth single on 6 April 2018 through Sony Music. Musically, it is a downtempo pop song that Styrke sings with whispered and falsetto vocals over a production consisting of a minimal beat and bird calls. The song's lyrics narrate the protagonist's desire to be in a relationship while her partner prefers to keep it casual.

"On the Low" received positive reviews from music critics, many of whom complimented its detailed production and Styrke's vocals. Upon its release, the song appeared below the top 100 of the Sverigetopplistan singles chart, reaching number 12 on the Heatseeker chart. Lisa Hultengren directed the accompanying lyric video in which Styrke performs the song on stage. She has performed the song live on several occasions, including a televised performance on Nyhetsmorgon in 2018 and a 2020 session hosted by Sveriges Radio P3, where she sang an acoustic rendition.

== Background ==
Tove Styrke wrote "On the Low" with Elof Loelv for her third studio album Sway (2018). It was one of the first songs written for the album and one of two tracks, along with "Mistakes", that was co-written by only Styrke and Loelv. Styrke said that the two spent heavy time in the studio "figuring each song out, fighting through it, to get it perfect". Styrke aimed to "strip everything down" with Sway and create minimal but interesting songs. Regarding "On the Low", she said that "it's basically just one sound, then a drum, then the vocal". To keep the song interesting, other components and sounds were added to the instrumentation. Loelv managed production and programming, in addition to playing all the instruments on the song. Henrik Edenhed mixed the track and Randy Merrill handled mastering. Styrke told Gaffa that out of all the tracks on Sway, she was the most proud of the chorus of "On the Low". She also named it her favorite song on the album in terms of melody. In an interview for Billboard, she labelled the track "the heart of the album", calling it "just very pure, in a way".

== Composition and lyrics ==
"On the Low"
An excerpt from the song, showcasing Styrke's whispered and falsetto vocals. Music critics noted its minimal and detailed production, backed by bird calls.

"On the Low" is a three-minute and 46-second downtempo pop song. Instrumentation is provided by a bass guitar, drums, percussion and a synthesizer. The track uses a "vibrating" beat and sounds of birds chirping as part of its backing. Music critics described the production as minimalistic and "airy", whereas NME writer Hannah Mylrea characterized it as "stripped back". Styrke utilizes breathy and whispered vocals throughout the song, while the chorus includes parts with falsetto. Steve Horowitz of PopMatters noted the singer's change of pitch and a "stretching" of her voice, writing that Styrke "speeds up and slows down her phrasing as if answering her own interpretations of what she's felt and observed". NME's Thomas Smith defined the song as an "exercise in whisper-pop".

Lyrically, "On the Low" narrates the protagonist's desire to be in a relationship. Styrke viewed the song as a "straight up love song". She said, "It's the smallest song in terms of how it sounds, but in another way it's the biggest." According to Idolator's Mike Nied, Styrke sings about hoping for a future with her partner while her partner prefers to keep the relationship casual, demonstrated in lines such as, "Why you need space now? I don't wanna zoom out. Now, what's wrong with you being close to me?" Matthew Kent of The Line of Best Fit wrote that the song "details the frustration and lack of freedom experienced when a relationship is kept under wraps". "On the Low" ends with an echo where the sounds of the bird calls are isolated, which Margaret Farrell of Pitchfork interpreted as a metaphor for desire. Farrell wrote that the closing bird calls transform "Styrke's lonely cave into her very own Garden of Eden, where temptation isn't taboo".

== Release and promotion ==
Styrke previewed "On the Low" in concert prior to its official release while touring in the fall of 2017. She also performed the song live while serving as the opening act for New Zealand singer Lorde on the Melodrama World Tour in the spring of 2018. The song was digitally released on 6 April 2018 through Sony Music. It was the fourth single issued from Sway ahead of the album's release in May 2018. Sepidar Hosseini designed the single's artwork, which follows the pattern of the other Sway singles by using an illustrated item on its cover. The artwork for "On the Low" features a skateboard. The single release coincided with a press release which announced Styrke would serve as the opening act for American singer Katy Perry during several European dates of Witness: The Tour.

To promote the single, Styrke performed "On the Low" on the TV4 morning show Nyhetsmorgon on 6 May 2018. Sony Music premiered a lyric video of the song via Styrke's YouTube channel on 26 June 2018. The video sees Styrke performing the song on stage. The visual was shot in a bar in East London earlier in the summer of 2018. She said, "I made a mini performance video for 'On the Low', like a little bonus thing just because I love that song so much." Lisa Hultengren directed the video, with Teodoro Johansson Beascoechea as co-director and cinematographer. Styrke included the song on the set list of the Sway Tour in 2018. She performed a live acoustic rendition of the song accompanied by guitar for P3 Session, hosted by radio station Sveriges Radio P3, on 10 April 2020. Styrke learnt how to play the guitar in the weeks leading up to the performance, which also included a cover of Benee and Gus Dapperton's 2019 song "Supalonely".

== Reception ==
"On the Low" was met with primarily positive reviews from music critics. At the time of its release, Kent of The Line of Best Fit gave the track a "Song of the Day" designation, writing, "An outlier in terms of the music we've heard from Sway thus far, it's a refreshing reminder that Styrke can do anything." TT News Agency writer Sara Haldert regarded "On the Low" a "playful, charming, and professional" song. Mylrea, writing for NME, deemed the song "expertly crafted" and highlighted Styrke's whispered vocals. Simon Österhof of Västerbottens-Kuriren called it "fantastic". Similarly, Lindsay Howard of Variance found the song "irresistible" and declared it a "gem". Kish Lal of The Sydney Morning Herald described the single as a "safe bet", commenting that "Styrke's husky whispering work[s] well against minimal downtempo pop beats".

Per Magnusson of Aftonbladet felt that "On the Low" showcased Styrke's "pop star potential", writing that the singer managed to adhere to commercial appeal and be different at the same time. Markus Larsson, also from Aftonbladet, praised the song's ability to sound "grand" even though its production is simple. He wrote that "the careful attention to suggestive details means that there is always more to discover". Farrell from Pitchfork also noted the "witty, unexpected details" throughout Sway, singling out the bird calls on "On the Low". Mas Karin Gustafsson, whose review appeared in Nya Wermlands-Tidningen, felt that the song suffers from the "cool" approach of other album tracks, writing that "On the Low" and the title track "blend into one another".

Rob Sheffield of Rolling Stone selected "On the Low" as the 23rd-best song of 2018. He wrote, "'On the Low' was a single that flopped everywhere ... but it's a huge hit in my head, a perfect storm of robot sad-girl synth hiccups." Commercially, "On the Low" became the first of Sway's singles to miss the top 100 of the Sverigetopplistan singles chart. The single debuted and peaked at number 12 on the Heatseeker chart on 13 April 2018. Its peak position made it the lowest-charting single of the album.

== Credits and personnel ==
Credits are adapted from Tidal.

- Tove Styrke – songwriting
- Elof Loelv – songwriting, production, programming, bass, drums, percussion, synthesizer
- Henrik Edenhed – mixing
- Randy Merrill – mastering

== Charts ==
Chart performance for "On the Low"
Chart (2018)	Peak position
Sweden Heatseeker (Sverigetopplistan)	12

== Release history ==
Release dates and formats for "On the Low"
Country	Date	Format	Label	Ref.
Various	6 April 2018	Digital download; streaming	Sony Music	
Sweden	10 April 2018	Radio airplay	Sony Music	
