= Vibe (Tove Styrke song) =

2018 single by Tove Styrke

Single by Tove Styrke

from the album Sway
- Released: 19 October 2018
- Genre: Electronic; pop
- Length: 2:54
- Label: Sony Music
- Songwriters: Tove Styrke; Elof Loelv; Negin Djafari
- Producer: Elof Loelv

Tove Styrke singles chronology
"Talk to Me" (2018)	"Vibe" (2018)	"Love Me Back" (2019)

"Vibe" is a song by Swedish singer Tove Styrke from her third studio album, Sway (2018). Styrke wrote the song with Elof Loelv and Negin Djafari, with production by Loelv. The song was added to digital editions of the album on 19 October 2018, five months after the original release. Sony Music issued it as Sway's sixth and final single on the same date. Musically, it is an electronic pop song with a prominent guitar and bass instrumentation. The lyrics deal with the end of a romance, contrary to the album's other tracks which narrate the beginning of relationships.

"Vibe" received generally positive reviews by music critics, some of whom named it one of the best new songs at the time of release. The song appeared below the top 100 of the Sverigetopplistan singles chart, peaking at number 10 on the Heatseeker chart. In autumn 2018, Styrke added the song to the set list of the British and Nordic legs of the Sway Tour, where she performed it as part of the show's encore. She also sang an acoustic rendition on Musikhjälpen in December 2018.

== Background ==
Tove Styrke wrote "Vibe" with Elof Loelv and Negin Djafari. Loelv managed production and programming, in addition to playing all the instruments on the song. Henrik Edenhed mixed the track and Randy Merrill handled mastering. Shortly after the release of her third studio album Sway in May 2018, Styrke revealed in an interview for Expressen that she had enough material nearly finished to put out new music later that year. In September 2018, she announced on her Twitter page that she was working on a new song, later revealed to be "Vibe". At that time Styrke had been working on it for several months. She said, "I'm actually super excited because I'm releasing a new song and I'm totally thrilled—I've been working on it for a while now, and I love it so much." Originally not included on Sway, "Vibe" was added to digital editions of the album on 19 October 2018, a week before her fall tour in the United Kingdom. The song was placed in between "I Lied" and "On a Level" as the seventh track on the album. In a press release, Sony Music described "Vibe" as the conclusion of "the Sway era", and Styrke regarded it an "ending but a new beginning at the same time".

== Composition and lyrics ==
"Vibe"
An excerpt from the song, showcasing its chorus with guitar and bass instrumentation.

Musically, "Vibe" is a two-minute and 54-second electronic pop song. It features a dominant guitar instrumentation and the chorus contains heavy bass. In an interview for Wonderland, Styrke described the song as "guitar-heavy", stating that she had wanted to create a guitar-based song for a while. The song's instrumentation is also provided by drums, keyboards, percussion and a synthesizer.

The lyrics of "Vibe" speak of the end of a relationship that did not work out, unlike other Sway album cuts which Styrke said are about the beginning of relationships. Although released several months after the album, she felt that the song is "in the same world" as the other Sway tracks and noted that it includes "a little bit more heartbreak" and "a little less lol". She elaborated that "it's the same person telling the story, but, in a way, it's also like a fresh beginning. It's a bit sadder". The chorus includes the line "I thought we had a vibe", referring to the protagonist believing that she had a "vibe" with another person who ultimately did not feel the same way. Regarding its theme, Styrke elaborated, "I feel like a lot of the songs on the album are about beginnings, before you know if it's going to work out or not. It was interesting to take it a little bit further into the future of knowing someone, where it actually pans out."

== Release and reception ==
Sony Music released "Vibe" as a standalone digital single on 19 October 2018 as the sixth and final single from Sway. Similar to the album's previous singles, the single cover uses illustrated artwork. Following its release, the song was added to the set list of the Sway Tour, beginning with the UK leg in October 2018. Styrke told MyLondon, "We play the whole of the Sway album, so it's really nice set and my favourite one I've done, there's the ups and the downs so it has a good flow to it." The song was also performed during subsequent concerts in the Nordic countries as part of the show's encore. In December 2018, Styrke performed a live acoustic rendition of the song on Musikhjälpen, staged in Lund, Sweden. That same month she also debuted a "special re-imagined" version of the song for Sony's "Lost in Music" concert series in New York City.

"Vibe" was met with general praise from music critics. At the time of its release, Andrea Washuus Bundgaard of Gaffa selected the song as one of the "best tracks right now". The writer opined that the "electronic and laid-back" song showcases Styrke's "edge and attitude". A journalist from The Guardian stated, "This year's excellent third album, Sway, is loaded with idiosyncratic electropop, while recent single 'Vibe' suggests that streak is continuing." Sofie Axelsen from Bands of Tomorrow designated it as one of the best new songs by a Nordic act the week of release, and Swedish magazine Sonic included the song on its Spotify playlist in October 2018. While reviewing Styrke's concert in December 2018, Västerbottens-Kuriren writer Henrik Lång regarded the song an "impactful" conclusion to the show. Yle's Anni Gullichsen also praised the live version of the song, while critic Jonathan Bengtsson of Göteborgs-Posten was critical of the performance in his review of the tour, selecting it as one of the worst songs of the show.

Commercially, "Vibe" became the third of Sway's singles to miss the top 100 of the Sverigetopplistan singles chart, after the 2018 singles "On the Low" and "Sway". "Vibe" debuted and peaked at number 10 on the Heatseeker chart on 26 October 2018. Its peak position made it the second-lowest-charting single of the album.

== Credits and personnel ==
Credits are adapted from Tidal.

- Tove Styrke – songwriting
- Elof Loelv – songwriting, production, programming, bass, drums, guitar, keyboards, percussion, synthesizer
- Negin Djafari – songwriting
- Henrik Edenhed – mixing
- Randy Merrill – mastering

== Charts ==
Chart performance for "Vibe"
Chart (2018)	Peak position
Sweden Heatseeker (Sverigetopplistan)	10

== Release history ==
Release dates and formats for "Vibe"
Country	Date	Format(s)	Label	Ref.
Various	19 October 2018	Digital download; streaming	Sony Music	
Sweden	24 October 2018	Radio airplay	Sony Music	
