= Changed My Mind =

2018 single by Tove Styrke

Single by Tove Styrke

from the album Sway
- Released: 2 February 2018
- Genre: Synth-pop; tropical house
- Length: 3:05
- Label: Sony Music
- Songwriter(s): Tove Styrke; Elof Loelv; Michael Trewartha; Kyle Trewartha; Kathryn Ostenberg; Linnea Södahl
- Producer(s): Elof Loelv

Tove Styrke singles chronology
"Mistakes" (2017)	"Changed My Mind" (2018)	"Endless" (2018)

Lyric video
- "Changed My Mind" on YouTube

"Changed My Mind" is a song by Swedish singer Tove Styrke from her third studio album Sway (2018). The song was written by the singer, Elof Loelv, Michael Trewartha, Kyle Trewartha, Kathryn Ostenberg, and Linnea Södahl, with production by Loelv. It was released as the third single from the album on 2 February 2018, through Sony Music. The synth-pop and tropical house song includes dancehall influences and vocoder effects. Its lyrics detail an on-again, off-again relationship where the singer changes her mind about her partner.

"Changed My Mind" received general praise from music critics, some of whom noted its commercial appeal. Upon its release, the song peaked at number 90 on the Sverigetopplistan singles chart in Sweden. For promotion, Sony Music released an accompanying lyric video. In addition to the clip, Styrke promoted the song with a live performance on Like a Version in April 2018. Grant, who served as the opening act for Styrke's Sway Tour in the Nordics in late 2018, released a cover version of the song on the tour's beginning date.

== Background and release ==
Tove Styrke wrote "Changed My Mind" with Elof Loelv, Michael and Kyle Trewartha of duo Grey, Kathryn Ostenberg, and Linnea Södahl, for her third studio album Sway (2018). Styrke mainly collaborated with Loelv on Sway and said that the two spent "a lot of time" working on the songs. She stated, "Both of us have really high standards and need to get it exactly right, but when you do it's worth it." Loelv managed both production and programming, in addition to playing all the instruments on the song. Henrik Edenhed mixed the track and Randy Merrill handled mastering.

"Changed My Mind" was digitally released on 2 February 2018, through Sony Music. It was the third single issued from Sway ahead of the album's release in May 2018. The single's artwork, designed by Sepidar Hosseini, features an illustrated pair of dice. In an interview for NME, Styrke was asked why dice were used and not a crystal ball, to which she answered, "We went for dice for that one as it's an immediate thing. The crystal ball is about your long-term future, and that's not really what this song is about. It's more 'Am I going to spend tonight with this person?' And... I'm kind of hoping for double sixes." The single release coincided with the announcement of Sway's forthcoming release date.

== Composition and lyrics ==
"Changed My Mind"
An excerpt from the song, showcasing the distorted vocals with vocoder. Styrke explained that the distortion alludes to intoxication.

"Changed My Mind" is a three-minutes and five-second synth-pop and tropical house song. Music commentators identified dancehall elements; Margaret Farrell of Pitchfork described it as a "Tilt-a-Whirling dancehall" track. Mike Wass, writing for Idolator, observed that the song's genre fits "between alt and mainstream-pop". Instrumentation is provided by a bass guitar, drums, handclaps, a guitar, keyboards, percussion, and a synthesizer. Time's Raisa Bruner characterized the production as a "light, minimalist pop backdrop". Styrke's vocals are distorted on the bridge with vocoder, while her vocals on the pre-chorus change in octaves.

The lyrics of "Changed My Mind" describe an on-again, off-again relationship while in its "on" phase. Maura Johnston from Rolling Stone noted that its lyrics express ambivalence, and Bruner viewed the song as a "nod at the complexities of modern love". The chorus includes the lines "Ooh pull me closer and I changed my mind, ooh it ain't over and I changed my mind", and "I wasn't really sure about us, but now I'm pretty sure about us." The Line of Best Fit writer Matthew Kent defined its lyricism as tongue-in-cheek. Styrke stated that "Changed My Mind" conveys an "almost anti-romantic" and "unromantic" side of love. In an interview for Ones to Watch, she elaborated: "My idea for it was that I wanted it to be like, when you follow a person, sort of the stalking process. You have a history with this person but then you realize that this person is not good for you." In a separate article in V, Styrke explained that early on in the song, her vocals are "super crisp and clear" when she sings the line "I changed my mind" and as it progresses, the vocoder "comes in and goes nuts" on the lyric. The singer said that "at that point I guess you're drunk and think it's the best decision ever". She told Billboard that the song has "that tipsiness vibe".

== Reception ==
"Changed My Mind" was met with generally positive reviews from music critics. Upon its release, Bruner from Time included the song on a list of "5 Songs You Need to Listen to This Week", writing that Styrke "is cleverly marking out her own pop territory". Kish Lal of The Sydney Morning Herald praised the single, commenting that "it is on songs like 'Changed My Mind' where [Styrke] sings with bravado that she is most impressive". Simon Österhof of Västerbottens-Kuriren called it "fantastic", and The Guardian's Graeme Virtue regarded the song a "deceptively casual banger" and stated, "Playful keyboard chops, a light dusting of sci-fi dancehall blarps and an octave-sliding pre-chorus are folded into a chart-ready fondant." Similarly, Wass from Idolator labeled it a "brilliant banger", concluding: "With any luck this could be the song that lifts her profile to the next level." Kent, writing for The Line of Best Fit, commended the track's melodies and tongue-in-cheek lyrics. In a more critical review, Markus Larsson of Aftonbladet deemed the song the only filler track on Sway, writing that the mix of tropical house and pop is "on autopilot".

Rolling Stone selected "Changed My Mind" as the 27th-best-song of 2018, writing: "The Swedish singer and candidate for Catchiest Artist Alive makes falling back into the arms of someone you swore off sound wickedly fun. It’s an expertly made synth-pop souffle — both light-as-air and satisfying." Commercially, the single did not match the performances of Sway's previous singles "Say My Name" and "Mistakes". "Changed My Mind" debuted at number 90 on the Swedish Sverigetopplistan singles chart on 9 February 2018 and lasted on the chart for a week.

== Promotion and cover version ==
To promote the single, an accompanying lyric video for "Changed My Mind" was uploaded to Styrke's official YouTube channel on 2 February 2018. The video was created by Regnet Co. Styrke performed the song on Like a Version for Australian radio station Triple J on 13 April 2018, and also included the song on the set list while touring for Sway in 2018. Swedish singer Grant released a cover version of "Changed My Mind" on 23 November 2018, through Sony Music. The cover was released on the same date as the beginning of the Nordic shows of the Sway Tour, for which Grant served as the opening act. Grant chose to cover the song because of its "great melody and great lyrics with a mixed message". She said that she "stripped the song to its melody and started building it from scratch", which included using strings in the production. Styrke approved of the cover, calling it "really beautiful".

== Credits and personnel ==
Credits are adapted from Tidal.

- Tove Styrke – songwriting
- Elof Loelv – songwriting, production, bass, clapping, drums, guitar, percussion, programming, synthesizer
- Michael Trewartha – songwriting
- Kyle Trewartha – songwriting
- Kathryn Ostenberg – songwriting
- Linnea Södahl – songwriting
- Henrik Edenhed – mixing
- Randy Merrill – mastering

== Charts ==
Chart performance for "Changed My Mind"
Chart (2018)	Peak position
Sweden (Sverigetopplistan)	90

== Release history ==
Release dates and formats for "Changed My Mind"
Country	Date	Format	Label	Ref.
Various	2 February 2018	Digital download; streaming	Sony Music	
Sweden	8 February 2018	Radio airplay	Sony Music	
