= Elisabeth Frerot Södergren =

Swedish journalist, television presenter and foreign correspondent

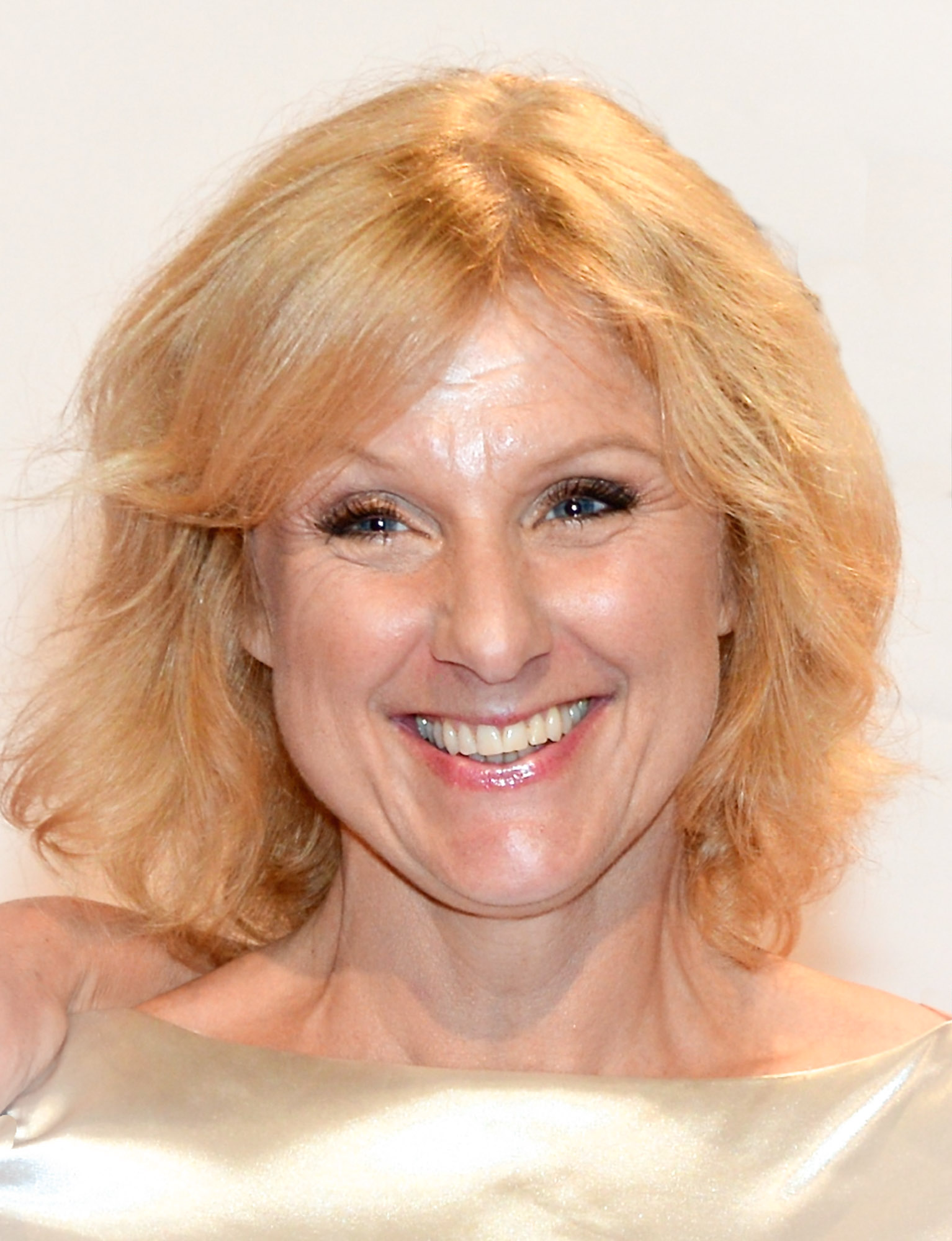
- Södergren in 2013.
- Occupations: Journalist, television presenter

Anna Elisabet Sophie Frerot Södergren is a Swedish journalist, television presenter and foreign correspondent. She has since 1990 worked for TV4. She has presented the investigative show Kalla fakta, and before working at TV4 she was also a news presenter for the local news show Östnytt at SVT. She was TV4 News foreign correspondent between 1998 and 2002 and covered news in cities like Paris and London.

Frerot presented the coverage of the 2003 Euro-vote in Sweden, she has also presented Nyhetsmorgon and the travel show När & fjäran. And in 1993 and 2003 she participated in Fort Boyard.
