= Cudi =

Cudi may refer to:

- Kid Cudi
- CUDI (University Corporation for Internet Development), Mexican internet consortium
- "C.U.D.I. (Can U Dig It)", 2019 song by Cosmo's Midnight
