= Mistakes (Tove Styrke song) =

2017 single by Tove Styrke

Single by Tove Styrke

from the album Sway
- Released: 15 September 2017
- Genre: Electropop
- Length: 3:24
- Label: Sony Music
- Songwriter(s): Tove Styrke; Elof Loelv
- Producer(s): Elof Loelv

Tove Styrke singles chronology
"Say My Name" (2017)	"Mistakes" (2017)	"Changed My Mind" (2018)

"Mistakes" is a song by Swedish singer Tove Styrke from her third studio album, Sway (2018). Styrke wrote the song with Elof Loelv, who handled the production. The inspiration behind the song originated from Styrke wanting to embrace being imperfect and making mistakes. It was released as the album's second single on 15 September 2017 through Sony Music. The electropop song features a vocoder-backed chorus and lyrics that describe the protagonist's willingness to take risks in a relationship. The instrumental incorporates sound effects and samples from various sources that correspond to the lyrics.

"Mistakes" received acclaim from music critics, who commended its pop sound and catchiness paired with its detailed production. Commercially, "Mistakes" fared the best out of the Sway singles; it peaked at number 42 on the Sverigetopplistan singles chart and was certified gold in Sweden by the Swedish Recording Industry Association (GLF). Joanna Nordahl directed the accompanying music video in which Styrke portrays a bride who runs away on her wedding day. The singer chose the bride imagery to represent the idea of perfection and references to the 1999 film Runaway Bride and 1990s wedding dress fashion are included. Styrke performed the song at the P3 Guld Awards ceremony in January 2018.

== Background and release ==
Tove Styrke co-wrote "Mistakes" with Elof Loelv for her third studio album Sway (2018). The two reportedly spent months "perfecting" the song and the structure of the chorus was altered several times, before they settled on a "stomping vocoder breakdown". In an interview for Entertainment Weekly, Styrke said, "I really think it pays off to spend a lot of time on production and also songwriting. It makes it richer in a sense." In an effort to make Sway's production interesting, Styrke aimed for each track to have its own identity and personality. She explained that "if you hear it once and then you hear it again you'd recognize it" by a distinct trait, and for "Mistakes" that trait would be its vocoder-backed chorus. In an interview for 7digital, she elaborated: "And finding those special sounds really takes time. For me, production is part of the songwriting. It's as important as the melody and the lyric, and they really need to work together." She revealed to Flaunt that finding the right zipper sample used in the final product took them "hours upon hours". Loelv managed production and programming for "Mistakes", in addition to playing all the instruments on the song. Henrik Edenhed mixed the track and Randy Merrill handled mastering.

Styrke previewed "Mistakes" in concert prior to its official release while touring in the summer of 2017. The song was digitally released on 15 September 2017 through Sony Music, alongside an accompanying lyric video uploaded to Styrke's official YouTube channel. The song was added for airplay on Swedish radio stations five days later. It was the second single issued from Sway ahead of the album's release in May 2018, after "Say My Name". Sepidar Hosseini designed the artwork for "Mistakes", which depicts an illustrated lamb. An official remix produced by Swedish production trio VAX was digitally released on 3 November 2017.

== Composition and lyrics ==
"Mistakes"
An excerpt from the song, showcasing the "stomping vocoder breakdown" with Styrke's robotic vocals.

Musically, "Mistakes" is a three-minute and 24-second synth-driven electropop song. Instrumentation is provided by a bass guitar, drums, handclaps, a guitar, keyboards, percussion, and a synthesizer. Raisa Bruner of Time identified the instrumental backdrop as "boom-clap drums, echoing synth, [and] a bubblegum keyboard", while describing Styrke's vocals as "accessible" and "nimble". In the chorus, her vocals are isolated and accompanied by only vocoder effects as she sings "you make me wanna make mistakes" and "Love how bittersweet it tastes". Halfway through the chorus, drums are added to the instrumentation, of which she said, "I love that. You put yourself in a vacuum-like space and everything's quiet then just breaks loose." Music commentators characterized Styrke's vocals as "robotic".

The production incorporates sound effects and samples from various sources, including a flickering street-light lamp and a buzzing bee, that correlate with the lyrics. The sound of a zipper is paired with the line "You know I'm gonna wanna get out of my Levi's", while the sound of a vibrating phone complements the line "Can't deny we got a real vibe". Styrke said, "I want a song to be like one of those pictures that you can look at and find new things in every time." Lyrically, "Mistakes" opens with the line "I should probably leave, right?" According to Erica Russell of PopCrush, the lyrical narrative of the song speaks of a romance the protagonist is willing to take risks for. Regarding its lyrical theme, Styrke divulged to The Fader that the song is about "embracing your wrongs, letting go of yourself and not being perfect", and further elaborated to V that it speaks of "never really feeling like you can stay in a place, and that sort of urge to ruin things, and do what you shouldn't". The chorus stemmed from a discussion about "feeling like fucking up", which she observed most people feel like at some point. This initial idea of wanting to "make mistakes" ultimately turned into the hook "you make me wanna make mistakes". In an article in Variance, Styrke was quoted on the inspiration behind "Mistakes", stating:

Mistakes can be about a person or yourself or just life in general. But I guess the point is that you don't need to be perfect and that there's something valuable in letting go of the person that you think you are or should be. Maybe all mistakes aren't mistakes.

== Reception ==
"Mistakes" was met with widespread praise from music critics. David Smyth of the London-based Evening Standard selected the song as one of the best tracks the week of its release, writing that "Tove Styrke is overdue a breakthrough in this country. Her latest single, 'Mistakes', is another striking blast of electropop". Idolator's Mike Wass described it as a "catchy bop" and "minimal electro-pop with maximum impact". Laurence Day of The Line of Best Fit also praised its catchiness and felt the song was "jarringly brilliant". Day commented that "it's the proper chorus that sets this tune apart, with juddering, semi-a cappella bursts from Styrke". Bruner, writing for Time, considered the song a "fresh new sound of pop", exclaiming that the singer "doesn't shy away from stripping her tracks down to their absolute catchiest elements". Simon Österhof of Västerbottens-Kuriren called the song "fantastic", and Lindsay Howard of Variance declared it a "pop gem". Mas Karin Gustafsson, whose review appeared in Nya Wermlands-Tidningen, called the song catchy and the best track on Sway.

PopMatters critic Steve Horowitz deemed the song "brilliant" and opined that Styrke "sings the lyrics with infectious bravado and a touch of vulnerability". Hannah Mylrea of NME viewed the song as "the glorious musical equivalent of getting butterflies in your stomach" and called it "pure pop perfection". Some commentators noted the detailed production of the song; Maura Johnston of Rolling Stone wrote that the sonic elements "add depth to Styrke's detailed portraits of push-pull romantic moments". Similarly, Margaret Farrell from Pitchfork wrote that the "pleasure of Sway is in the witty, unexpected details", highlighting the zipper and phone sounds on "Mistakes". Billboard writer Nolan Feeney stated that the minimal instrumentals "soundtrack the delicate moments that happen around it", also singling out the phone sound effect on the song, which the writer called an "are-we-just-hooking-up ode".

Commercially, the song debuted and peaked at number 42 on the Swedish singles chart on 22 September 2017. This feat made it the highest-charting-single from Sway. "Mistakes" remained on the chart for a total of six weeks. The song received a gold certification by the Swedish Recording Industry Association (GLF), indicating over four million streams in Sweden.

== Music video ==
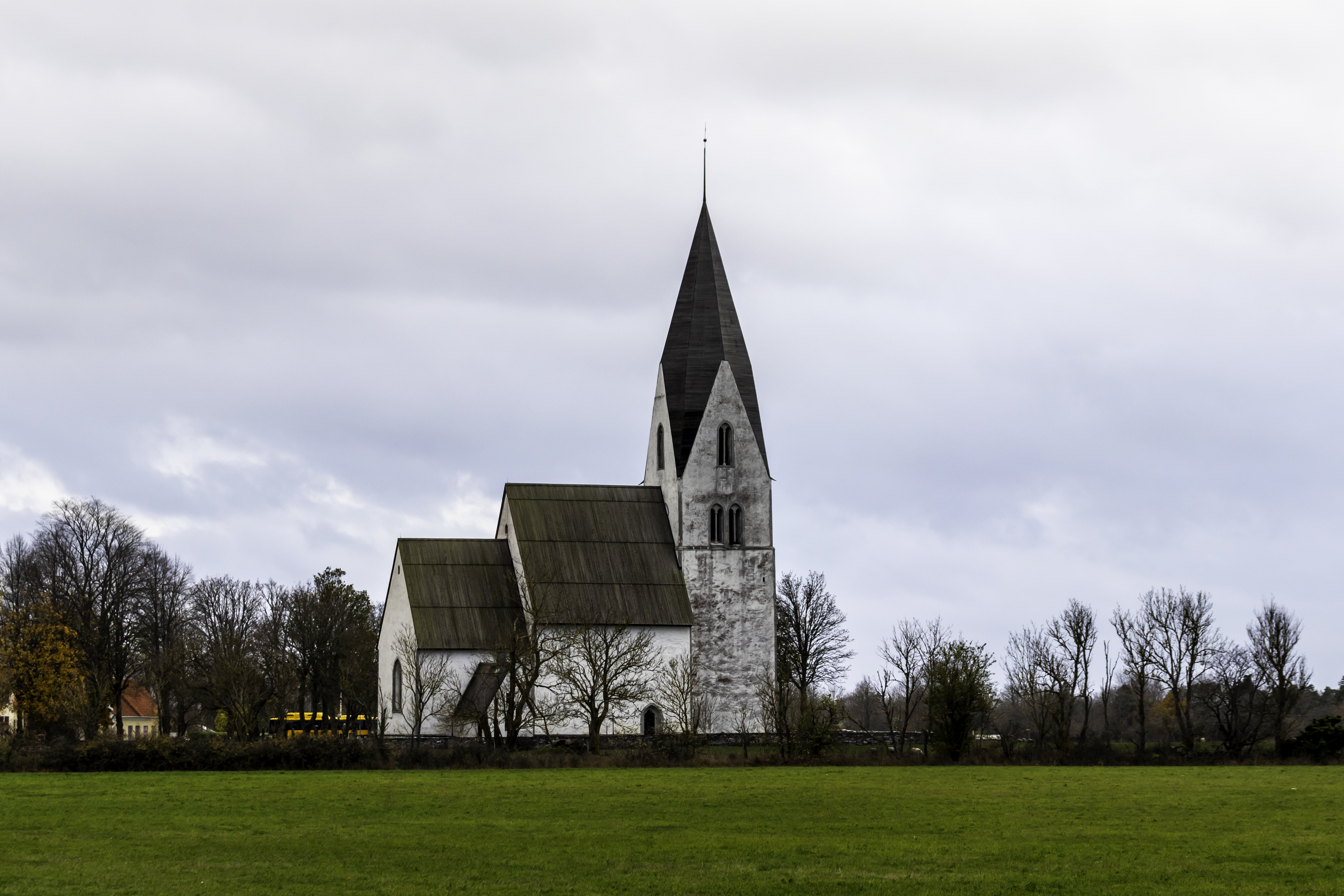
Tofta Church on Gotland appears in the music video for "Mistakes".

Joanna Nordahl directed the music video for "Mistakes". Styrke enlisted Nordahl as the creative director for the visuals for Sway as she felt it was important to her to work with a woman and a director who understood her views and visions. The video portrays Styrke as a runaway bride who flees on her wedding day. As the song is about "not being perfect", she told The Fader that the image of a bride symbolizes "perfection" to her and "it was fun to put a twist on that. It's more like she's running back to herself rather than running away." With the video's concept, Nordahl wanted to avoid a "typical love story", stating that they "ended up speaking about religious symbolism, the Madonna–whore complex, femininity, 90s rom-coms, Britney Spears, and the well behaved, wholesome bride as a traditional representation of the 'perfect woman'". In an interview for Clash, Styrke said: "I wanted to make the video for 'Mistakes' cinematic and tell a story of this woman who rejects convention and goes her own way. It felt powerful."

The video was shot in late August 2017 on the Swedish island of Gotland in various locations, including Tofta Church. As the video's budget did not cover the costs of casting extras needed for the shoot, Styrke reached out to Gotland-based women's basketball team Visby Ladies and five members of the team agreed to appear. The fashion in the video was inspired by the 1999 film Runaway Bride, and a collector of 1990s wedding dresses lent several dresses to the shoot. For one scene the entire studio was covered with the dresses, which Styrke described as a "landscape of wedding dresses". Regarding her styling in the video, she told Fashionista that "it's this romantic theme with the wedding dresses, pink, red lips and lots of lashes. We go through different styles with interesting fabrics and cool silhouettes."

The video premiered on 4 October 2017, via Styrke's YouTube channel. It begins with the singer sitting on the floor in her wedding dress as church bells ring and there is an intense knocking on the door. As she stands up and puts on her veil, she escapes out the window as the knocks continue. These shots are interspersed with scenes of Styrke dressed in pink in a room entirely covered with wedding dresses. She runs out of the church and tosses her bouquet in the air. Styrke continues to run through different scenery including a field and a forest until she reaches a cliff facing the ocean during the song's bridge. There she is joined by other runaway brides, portrayed by Visby Ladies members. The scene then shifts to Styrke and the other brides dancing at a rave. Styrke told The Fader, "I find that there's both loneliness and empowerment in running; we wanted the video to balance between those two." She found the final scene "the perfect way" to end the story. Shahzaib Hussain, writing for Clash, described the video as "a middle finger up to deterministic patriarchy and a showcase in liberation".

== Live performances ==
Styrke first performed "Mistakes" during her set at the Way Out West festival in Gothenburg, Sweden, in August 2017. She opened the P3 Guld Awards ceremony in January 2018 with a performance of the song, for which she wore a deconstructed wedding dress. Styrke also included "Mistakes" on the set list of the Sway Tour of 2018.

== Track listing ==
- Digital single
1. "Mistakes" – 3:24
- Digital single – Remix
1. "Mistakes" (VAX remix) – 3:03

== Credits and personnel ==
Credits are adapted from Tidal.

- Tove Styrke – songwriting
- Elof Loelv – songwriting, production, bass, clapping, drums, guitar, percussion, programming, synthesizer
- Henrik Edenhed – mixing
- Randy Merrill – mastering

== Charts ==
Chart performance for "Mistakes"
Chart (2017)	Peak position
Sweden (Sverigetopplistan)	42

== Certifications ==
Certifications for "Mistakes"
Region	Certification	Certified units/sales
Sweden (GLF)	Gold	4,000,000^{†}
^{†} Streaming-only figures based on certification alone.

== Release history ==
Release dates and formats for "Mistakes"
Country	Date	Format(s)	Version	Label	Ref.
Various	15 September 2017	Digital download; streaming	Original	Sony Music	
Sweden	20 September 2017	Radio airplay	Original	Sony Music	
Various	3 November 2017	Digital download; streaming	VAX remix	Sony Music	
