= Yesteryear (album) =

Studio album by Cosmo's Midnight
- Released: 2 October 2020
- Length: 40:37
- Label: Sony Music Australia
- Producer: Cosmo's Midnight

Cosmo's Midnight chronology
What Comes Next (2018)	Yesteryear (2020)

Singles from Yesteryear
- 1. "C.U.D.I. (Can U Dig It)" Released: 1 March 2019; 2. "Have It All" Released: 17 July 2019; 3. "It's Love" Released: 24 November 2019; 4. "Down for You" Released: 31 January 2020; 5. "Yesteryear" Released: 11 June 2020; 6. "Idaho" Released: September 2020

Yesteryear is the second studio album by Australian electronic music duo Cosmo's Midnight, released through Sony Music Australia on 2 October 2020. Solely produced by the duo, the album features guest appearances from Matthew Young, Age.Sex.Location, Stevan, and Ruel.

Yesteryear was a critical and commercial success, peaking at number 42 on the ARIA Albums Chart and receiving a nomination for Best Dance Release at the 2021 ARIA Music Awards.

== Background ==
Upon release, the duo said "It's an album inspired by personal growth, looking back on these experiences, learning from them and moving forward with optimism."

== Critical reception ==
Yesteryear received critical acclaim.

Jake Cleland from Stack Magazine said "Their second album shows more mature songwriting and a stronger sense of self, but nostalgia for the past. Even as they define themselves on their own terms, they're apprehensive about what they've left behind. But if their last album reappropriated the past, here they're creating the future. As inheritors of the Modular-era mantle, they have nothing to worry about. Memories of yesteryear might make them wistful, but the present is bright."

Sose Fuamoli from Triple J called the album "a sophisticated and well-engineered collection of music, showing that even though they spent a lot of Yesteryear's creative process reflecting and looking back, Cosmo's Midnight's future has never been brighter."

== Track listing ==
Yesteryear track listing
No.	Title	Length
1.	"Unwind"	3:30
2.	"Yesteryear"	3:39
3.	"It's Love" (featuring Matthew Young)	3:15
4.	"Have It All" (featuring Age.Sex.Location)	3:24
5.	"Ice" (featuring Stevan)	3:43
6.	"A Million Times"	3:39
7.	"Down for You" (with Ruel)	3:13
8.	"The Get Down"	2:02
9.	"Time Wasted"	3:26
10.	"Idaho"	3:37
11.	"C.U.D.I. (Can U Dig It)"	3:43
12.	"We Could Last Forever"	3:35
Total length:		40:37

== Charts ==
Chart performance for Yesteryear
Chart (2020)	Peak position
Australian Albums (ARIA)	42
