= Down for You =

Single by Cosmo's Midnight and Ruel

from the album Yesteryear
- Released: 31 January 2020
- Length: 3:13
- Label: Nite High, Sony Music Australia
- Songwriter(s): Peter James Harding; Cosmo and Patrick Liney; Ruel Vincent Van Djik
- Producer(s): Cosmo's Midnight

Cosmo's Midnight singles chronology
| ""It's Love" (2019) | "Down for You" (2020) | "Yesteryear" (2020) |

Ruel singles chronology
| "Real Thing" (2019) | "Down for You" (2020) | "Empty Love" (2020) |

Music video
- "Down for You" on YouTube

"Down for You" is a song recorded by Australian electronic music duo Cosmo's Midnight and Australian singer-songwriter Ruel. The song was released on 31 January 2020 as the fourth single from Cosmo's Midnight second studio album Yesteryear. The song peaked at number 9 on the New Zealand Hot Singles.

Originally meet in 2018, Cosmo's Midnight invited Ruel to make his festival debut as a guest vocalist in their set at Groovin the Moo festival. Upon release of the single, Cosmo's Midnight said "He joined us on stage for an impromptu on-stage collab. We immediately knew we had to write a song together. The stars didn't align until a year later, but we made up for lost time and wrote 'Down for You'. In the studio we were basically talking about how you do things you don't want to for people you like ala Bobby Caldwell 'What You Won't Do' - and it all flowed from there. We had the song basically done that day, but had to back n forth a bit to finesse the details." Ruel added "[it] Was so much fun writing this one with the boys. The song kinda wrote itself in the session we had. We all felt like we really related to the story we wrote. So happy to finally have a song out with Cosmo and Pat."

The song poled number 83 on the Triple J Hottest 100, 2020.

== Music video ==
The music video premiered on the 18 March 2020.

== Reception ==
Kaitlin Milligan from Broadway World said "'Down For You' is an adoring serenade, pairing Ruel's smooth vocals and alluring pull with Cosmo's Midnight's playful production and signature sonic universe. Ruel's soulful words and subtle R&B speak to the throws of love and hypnotic devotion where nothing else can exist, while the unmistakable grin of the Cosmos' pop-infused sound and funky drum beat forge the hook."

Maxamillion Polo from Ones to Watch said "'Down for You' moves with all the easygoing swagger and sentimentality of the best of R&B numbers. It is instantly infectious, showcasing the innate star power of Ruel and the meticulous production prowess of Cosmo's Midnight. Here is to this match made in heaven, and here is to hoping this isn't the last time we see these two on the same track."

== Track listing ==
Digital download

1. "Down for You" – 3:13

Digital download (Remixes)

1. "Down for You" (featuring RIMON) – 2:46

== Charts ==
| Chart (2020) | Peak position |
|---|---|
| New Zealand Hot Singles (RMNZ) | 9 |
