= Winston Surfshirt =

Australian funk/hip-hop band

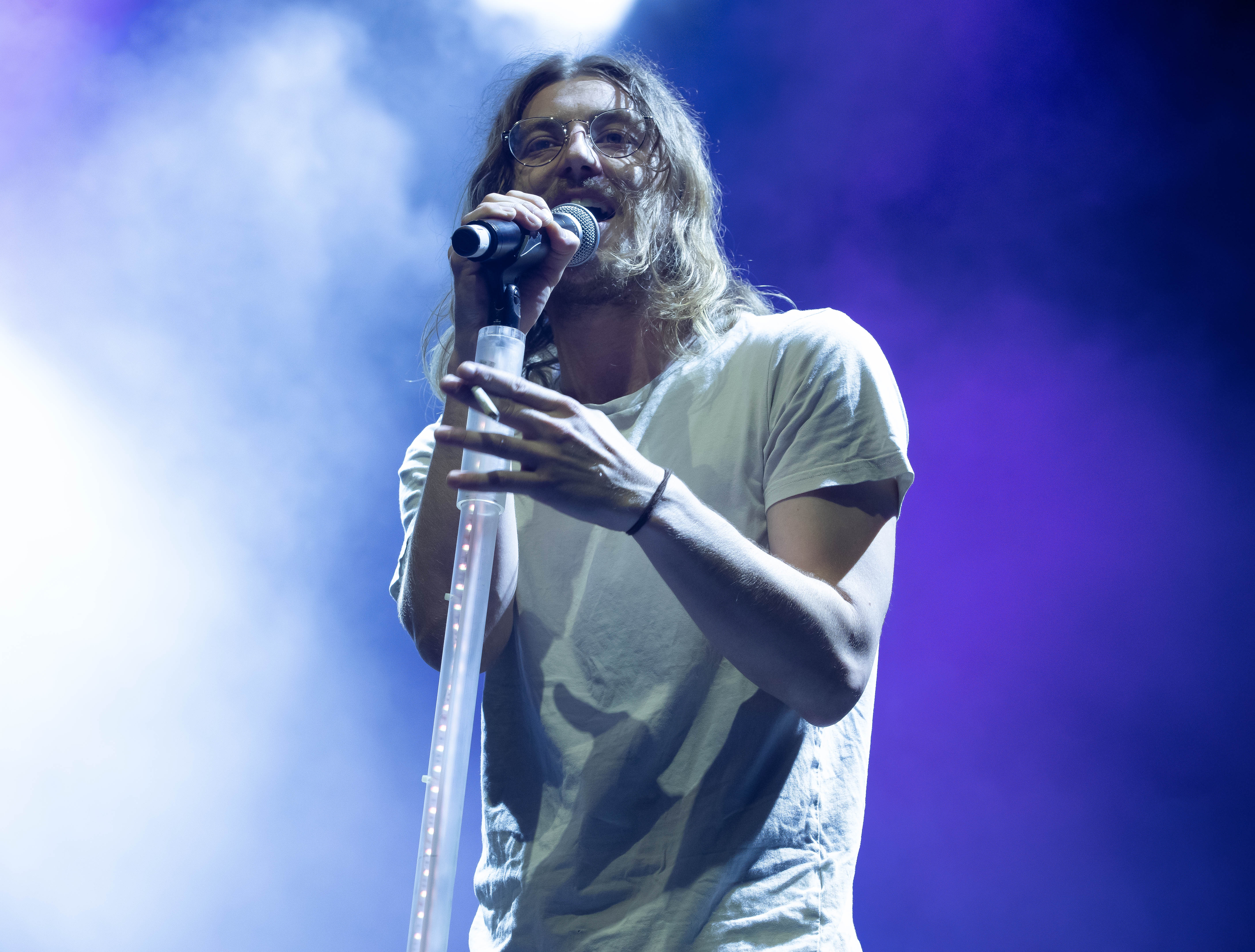
- Winston Surfshirt performing in 2018

Background information
- Origin: Manly, New South Wales, Australia
- Genres: Funk; hip-hop
- Years active: 2015–present
- Members: Winston; Bustlip; The Bone; Bik Julio; Dool; Mi-K
- Website: winstonsurfshirt.com

Winston Surfshirt is an Australian funk and hip-hop band formed in 2015 by lead vocalist and multi-instrumentalist Winston, drummer Bustlip, trombonist the Bone, bass guitarist Bik Julio, keyboardist Dool, and guitarist Mi-K. They have released four studio albums, one remix album, one EP, and numerous singles.

== History ==
Winston Surfshirt was formed in 2015 by singer and multi-instrumentalist Winston, drummer Bustlip, trombonist the Bone, bassist Bik Julio, keyboardist Dool, and guitarist Mi-K. Their stylistic influences include both surf rock and West Coast hip-hop. They have performed at Falls Festival and Splendour in the Grass as well as supporting Rüfüs on tour. Winston Surfshirt released their debut album, Sponge Cake, in September 2017, and their second, Apple Crumble, in November 2019. Their third record, Panna Cotta, came out in November 2022. It featured guest appearances by Genesis Owusu, Talib Kweli, Kimbra, Devin the Dude, Young Franco, and Dope Lemon, among others. The group's fourth album, Winston, was issued in July 2025.

== Band members ==
- Winston – vocals, multiple instruments
- Bustlip – drums
- The Bone – trombone
- Bik Julio – bass
- Dool – keyboards
- Mi-K – guitar

== Discography ==
=== Studio albums ===
List of studio albums, with release date, label, and selected chart positions
Title	Details	Peak chart positions
Title	Details	AUS
Sponge Cake	Released: 29 July 2017; Label: Sweat It Out, Warner Music Australia (SWEATA012); Formats: CD, LP, digital download, streaming	24
Apple Crumble	Released: 15 November 2019; Label: Sweat It Out, Warner (SWEATA017); Formats: CD, LP, digital download, streaming	38
Panna Cotta	Released: 11 November 2022; Label: BMG (538824432); Formats: CD, LP, cassette, digital download, streaming	—
Winston	Released: 25 July 2025; Label: Sweat It Out; Formats: CD, LP, digital download, streaming	TBA

=== Remix albums ===
List of remix albums, with release date and label
Title	Details
Sponge Cake Rebaked	Released: 27 April 2018; Label: Sweat It Out, Warner (SWEATDS317DJ); Formats: Digital download, streaming

=== EPs ===
List of extended plays, with release date and label
Title	Details
Cover Your Mouth (Live from Lockdown)	Released: 12 March 2021; Label: Sweat It Out; Formats: Digital download, streaming

=== Singles ===
==== As lead artist ====
List of singles, with year released and album name
Title	Year	Album
"Be About You"	2017	Sponge Cake
"Ali D"	2017	Sponge Cake
"Same Same"	2017	Sponge Cake
"FreeForYou" (solo or Mookhi remix)	2017	Sponge Cake
"21 Questions" (Triple J Like a Version)	2017	Non-album single
"For the Record"	2018	Apple Crumble
"Make a Move"	2019	Apple Crumble
"Smile"	2019	Apple Crumble
"The Antidote" (with Blackwave; featuring Benny Sings)	2019	Are We Still Dreaming?
"All of the Little Things" (featuring Ramirez)	2021	Panna Cotta
"Complicated" (featuring Young Franco)	2021	Panna Cotta
"There's Only One" (featuring Genesis Owusu)	2022	Panna Cotta
"Maybe I'm in Love with You" (featuring Talib Kweli)	2022	Panna Cotta
"Of Another Kind" (featuring Milan Ring and Jerome Farah)	2022	Panna Cotta
"I Want You (To Be My Woman)" (with Dope Lemon)	2022	Panna Cotta
"Boots"	2024	Winston
"Ice Cream"	2025	Winston
"Spend My Nights"	2025	Winston
"One Sugar"	2025	Winston
Jeep	2025	Winston

==== As featured artist ====
List of singles, with year released, selected chart positions, certifications, and album name
Title	Year	Peak chart positions	Certifications	Album
Title	Year	NZ	Certifications	Album
"Sly" (Polographia featuring Winston Surfshirt)	2016	—		Friends
"Get to Know" (Cosmo's Midnight featuring Winston Surfshirt)	2018	—	ARIA: Gold	What Comes Next
"Pinned Upon" (Poloshirt featuring Winston Surfshirt)	2018	—		Poloshirt
"Every Day Is a Holiday" (Dope Lemon featuring Winston Surfshirt)	2020	— (Note: "Every Day Is a Holiday" did not enter the NZ Top 40 Singles Chart but peaked at number 25 on the NZ Hot Singles Chart.)		Rose Pink Cadillac

== Awards and nominations ==
=== AIR Awards ===
The Australian Independent Record Awards (commonly known as AIR Awards) is an annual awards night to recognise, promote, and celebrate the success of Australia's independent music sector.

Year	Nominee / work	Award	Result	Ref.
2018	Sponge Cake	Best Independent Hip Hop/Urban Album	Nominated	
2023	Panna Cotta	Best Independent Soul/R&B Album or EP	Nominated	

=== APRA Awards ===
The APRA Awards are several award ceremonies run in Australia by the Australasian Performing Right Association to recognise composing and songwriting skills, sales, and airplay performance by its members annually.

Year	Nominee / work	Award	Result
2021	"NobodyLikeYou"	Most Performed R&B / Soul Work	Nominated
