= Walk with Me (Cosmo's Midnight song) =

Single by Cosmo's Midnight featuring Kučka

from the album Moments
- Released: 16 July 2015
- Length: 4:13
- Label: Nite High, Sony
- Songwriter(s): Cosmo Liney; Patrick Liney; Laura Jane Lowther

Cosmo's Midnight singles chronology
"Snare" (2014)	"Walk with Me" (2015)	"History" (2016)

Kučka singles chronology
"Flux 98" (2015)	"Walk with Me" (2015)	"Adhedoniac" (2015)

Music video
- "Walk with Me" on YouTube

"Walk with Me" is a song by Australian electronic music duo Cosmo's Midnight featuring Kučka, released in July 2015 as the second and final single from their second extended play Moments.

== Background ==
The music video was released in October 2015.

Upon release, Cosmo's Midnight said "Kučka was a dream to work with in the studio, she writes excellent top lines and as a producer herself she has great input when it comes to writing the track as well. She is super quick and makes very few mistakes so when it comes to comping the vocals it was all super easy, we will definitely be working with her again."

"Walk with Me" was the most played song on Triple J in 2015.

== Critical reception ==
Charles Douglas from Pile Rats said "Lowther's (Kučka) glistening high-pitched vocals and soulful melodies bring a welcome electro-pop dimension to Cosmo’s Midnight, extending what is already a high-quality production into something quite special."

== Remixes ==
- Skylar Spence remix - 4:29
- Maxo crash mix - 3:10
- KOA remix - 4:20

== Certifications ==
Certifications for "Walk with Me"
Region	Certification	Certified units/sales
Australia (ARIA)	Gold	35,000^{‡}
^{‡} Sales+streaming figures based on certification alone.
