= What Comes Next (album) =

Studio album by Cosmo's Midnight
- Released: 15 June 2018
- Genre: Electronic
- Label: Nite High; Sony Music Australia

Cosmo's Midnight chronology
Moments (2015)	What Comes Next (2018)	Yesteryear (2020)

Singles from What Comes Next
- 1. "History" Released: 12 January 2017; 2. "Get to Know" Released: 16 February 2018; 3. "Polarised" Released: 27 April 2018; 4. "Talk to Me" Released: October 2018; 5. "Lowkey" Released: November 2018

What Comes Next is the debut studio album by Australian electronic music duo Cosmo's Midnight, released on 15 June 2018. The album debuted at number 36 on the ARIA Charts. The album cover was illustrated by Charlotte Mei.

== Track listing ==
What Comes Next track listing
No.	Title	Length
1.	"Confidence" (featuring Woodes)	4:28
2.	"Lowkey" (featuring Buddy & Jay Prince)	3:39
3.	"Montego"	3:07
4.	"With U" (featuring Panama)	3:31
5.	"Talk to Me" (featuring Tove Styrke)	3:53
6.	"Get to Know" (featuring Winston Surfshirt)	4:03
7.	"When You Been" (featuring Boogie)	3:08
8.	"What Comes Next" (interlude)	0:44
9.	"Polarised"	3:08
10.	"History"	3:28
11.	"Dreamer" (featuring Pauli)	3:30
12.	"Lovelight"	3:07
Total length:		39:44

== Charts ==
Chart performance for What Comes Next
Chart (2018)	Peak position
Australian Albums (ARIA)	36
