= Hard Tour =

2022–23 concert tour by Tove Styrke

- Tour by Tove Styrke
- Location: North America; Europe
- Associated album: Hard
- Start date: 23 September 2022
- End date: 16 February 2023
- Legs: 3
- No. of shows: 28

Tove Styrke concert chronology
- Sway Tour (2018); Hard Tour (2022–23); ...

The Hard Tour was a concert tour by Swedish singer Tove Styrke in support of her fourth studio album Hard (2022). The tour began on 23 September 2022 in Jönköping, Sweden, and concluded on 16 February 2023 in Berlin, Germany, comprising 28 shows throughout three legs in Europe and North America.

== Shows ==
List of concerts, showing date, city, country, and venue
Date	City	Country	Venue
Europe
23 September 2022	Jönköping	Sweden	Bongo Bar
24 September 2022	Falun	Sweden	Heymakers
29 September 2022	Gothenburg	Sweden	Pustervik
30 September 2022	Lund	Sweden	Mejeriet
1 October 2022	Copenhagen	Denmark	Rust
8 October 2022	Helsingborg	Sweden	The Tivoli
14 October 2022	Sundsvall	Sweden	Quality Hotel
15 October 2022	Uppsala	Sweden	Katalin
21 October 2022	Uddevalla	Sweden	Carlia Live
22 October 2022	Malmö	Sweden	KB
28 October 2022	Stockholm	Sweden	Nalen
29 October 2022	Örebro	Sweden	Kulturkvarteret
North America
3 November 2022	New York City	United States	Mercury Lounge
5 November 2022	Chicago	United States	Beat Kitchen
7 November 2022	Los Angeles	United States	Moroccan Lounge
9 November 2022	San Francisco	United States	Rickshaw Stop
Europe
2 February 2023	Brighton	England	Patterns
3 February 2023	Birmingham	England	O2 Institute
4 February 2023	Glasgow	Scotland	King Tut's
6 February 2023	Dublin	Ireland	Academy Green Room
7 February 2023	Manchester	England	The Deaf Institute
9 February 2023	London	England	Lafayette
10 February 2023	Brussels	Belgium	Le Botanique
11 February 2023	Cologne	Germany	Helios 37
12 February 2023	Paris	France	Les Etoiles Theatre
14 February 2023	Hamburg	Germany	Nochtwache
15 February 2023	Amsterdam	Netherlands	Melkweg
16 February 2023	Berlin	Germany	Privatclub

=== Cancelled shows ===
List of cancelled concerts, showing date, city, country, venue, and reason for cancellation
Date	City	Country	Venue	Reason
9 March 2023	Seattle	United States	Madame Lou's	Logistical issues and costs
10 March 2023	Vancouver	Canada	Biltmore	Logistical issues and costs
11 March 2023	Portland	United States	Doug Fir Lounge	Logistical issues and costs
14 March 2023	Denver	United States	Globe Hall	Logistical issues and costs
16 March 2023	Minneapolis	United States	Turf Club	Logistical issues and costs
18 March 2023	Detroit	United States	Loving Touch	Logistical issues and costs
20 March 2023	Pittsburgh	United States	Club AE	Logistical issues and costs
21 March 2023	Toronto	Canada	Garrison	Logistical issues and costs
23 March 2023	Boston	United States	Brighton Music Hall	Logistical issues and costs
24 March 2023	Philadelphia	United States	Foundry	Logistical issues and costs
25 March 2023	Washington, D.C.	United States	Union Stage	Logistical issues and costs
