= Sway (Tove Styrke album) =

Studio album by Tove Styrke
- Released: 4 May 2018
- Genre: Electropop
- Length: 26:48
- Label: RCA
- Producer: John Alexis; Joe Janiak; Elof Loelv; Gustav Nyström

Tove Styrke chronology
Kiddo (2015)	Sway (2018)	Hard (2022)

Singles from Sway
- 1. "Say My Name" Released: 28 April 2017; 2. "Mistakes" Released: 15 September 2017; 3. "Changed My Mind" Released: 2 February 2018; 4. "On the Low" Released: 6 April 2018; 5. "Sway" Released: 2 May 2018; 6. "Vibe" Released: 19 October 2018

Sway is the third studio album by Swedish singer Tove Styrke. It was released on 4 May 2018 by RCA Records. It peaked at number 11 on the Swedish Albums Chart.

== Production ==
The production of the album took more than 18 months. In a 2018 interview with Evening Standard, Styrke said: "I really wanted to strip things down. It was the opposite of my previous project, where the main rule was that there are no rules. This one was about restraint, making sure that every part is good enough to be there. And when you make it that minimal, it asks more of the song. You're going to hear every word, every melody, and it all matters so much."

== Release and singles ==
On 28 April 2017, Styrke released "Say My Name"as the lead single from the album. The second single "Mistakes" followed on 15 September. A cover of Lorde's "Liability" re-titled "Liability (Demo)" was unveiled as a promotional single on 15 December. "Changed My Mind" was unveiled as the third single alongside the album announcement on 2 February 2018. Before the album's release, the single "On the Low" came out. A music video for the single "Sway" premiered on 8 June 2018. Another track called "Vibe" was released as a single on 19 October 2018, included in a digital re-edition of the album ahead of a tour through United Kingdom.

To promote the album, Styrke embarked on the Sway Tour in the fall of 2018.

== Critical reception ==
Professional ratings
Review scores
Source	Rating
NME	5/5 stars
Pitchfork	7.5/10
PopMatters	8/10 stars

Margaret Farrell of Pitchfork gave the album a 7.5 out of 10, calling it "one of the most exuberant albums in recent memory." Owen Myers of The Fader described it as "a short and very sweet triumph, with eight inventive pop songs that align Styrke closely with the genre's current forward-thinking vanguard."

On 4 May 2018, Rolling Stone included it on the "10 New Albums to Stream Now" list. On 22 May 2018, NME included it on the "Best Albums of 2018 So Far" list.

=== Accolades ===
Publication	Accolade	Rank	Ref.
MusicOMH	Top 50 Albums of 2018	48	
Rolling Stone	20 Best Pop Albums of 2018	12	

== Track listing ==
All tracks produced by Elof Loelv, except where noted.

Standard edition
No.	Title	Writer(s)	Producer(s)	Length
1.	"Sway"	Tove Styrke; Joe Janiak; Mozella	Joe Janiak; Elof Loelv^{[a]}	3:30
2.	"Say My Name"	Styrke; Loelv; Sibanda		3:25
3.	"On the Low"	Styrke; Loelv		3:46
4.	"Mistakes"	Styrke; Loelv		3:25
5.	"Changed My Mind"	Styrke; Loelv; Söhdahl; Trewartha; Trewartha; Osternberg		3:05
6.	"I Lied"	Styrke; Loelv; Ailin		3:13
7.	"On a Level"	Styrke; Janiak	Janiak; Gustav Nyström^{[a]}	3:31
8.	"Liability" (demo)	Jack Antonoff; Ella Yelich-O'Connor	John Alexis	2:53
Total length:				26:48

iTunes Store edition
No.	Title	Length
1.	"Sway"	3:30
2.	"Say My Name"	3:25
3.	"On the Low"	3:46
4.	"Mistakes"	3:25
5.	"Changed My Mind"	3:05
6.	"I Lied"	3:13
7.	"Vibe"	2:54
8.	"On a Level"	3:31
9.	"Liability" (demo)	2:53
Total length:		29:42

Notes

- ^{^[a]} signifies a co-producer

== Personnel ==
Credits adapted from the liner notes of the CD edition.

- Tove Styrke – vocals, executive production
- Joe Janiak – production (1, 7)
- Elof Loelv – co-production (1), production (2, 3, 4, 5, 6)
- Gustav Nyström – co-production (7)
- John Alexis – production (8)
- Henrik Edenhed – mixing
- Henrik Jonsson – mastering
- Randy Merrill – mastering
- Tom Coyne – mastering
- Joanna Nordahl – creative direction
- Sepidar Hosseini – visual identity
- Emma Svensson – photography
- Petter Eriksson – executive production

== Charts ==
Chart performance for Sway
Chart (2018)	Peak position
Swedish Albums (Sverigetopplistan)	11
