= Cosmo's Midnight =

Australian electronic music duo

- Origin: Sydney, New South Wales, Australia
- Genre: Electronic
- Instruments: Digital audio workstation; drum machines; vibraslap; woodblocks; vocals
- Years active: 2012–present
- Labels: Nite Hight; Sony Music Australia
- Members: Cosmo Liney; Patrick Liney
- Website: cosmosmidnight.com

Cosmo's Midnight are an Australian electronic music duo formed in 2012 in Sydney, New South Wales. The duo consists of twin brothers, Cosmo and Patrick Liney. Their debut studio album, What Comes Next (2018), peaked at number 36 on the ARIA Albums Chart.

== Artistry ==
=== Musical instruments and sound ===
Cosmo's Midnight are best known for their use of the vibraslap, a percussive instrument. AllMusic's Marcy Donelson described their music as having "bright keyboard timbres and idiosyncratic beats" and stated that they typically collaborate with acts "from the pop, indie electronica, rap, and EDM realms."

=== Musical style and influences ===
Cosmo's Midnight cite Daft Punk, Chic, Nile Rodgers and West Coast rap as musical influences.

== History ==
Cosmo's Midnight were formed by twin brothers, Cosmo and Patrick Liney, as a music duo in Sydney in 2012 after graduating from St Andrews Cathedral School. They provide different styles within electronic music often with pop and R&B elements. Their tracks have been included in several compilation albums such as the 2015 Ministry of Sound FUT.UR.ISM 3.0 and Chillout Sessions XVIII. Tracks have also been presented on radio stations such as Triple J, FBi Radio, BBC Radio 1, and KEXP. They were signed to Astral People management after winning a Future Classic remix contest for Flume's "Sleepless" in 2012.

Cosmo's Midnight released their debut single, "Phantasm" featuring Nicole Millar, followed by their debut extended play, Surge, on indie label, Yes Please, in mid-2013. They remixed other artists including Panama, Indian Summer, Anna Lunoe and AlunaGeorge before signing to Sony Music Australia in 2014. Cosmo's Midnight released singles "Snare" featuring Wild Eyed Boy and "Walk with Me" featuring Kučka as well as their second EP, Moments, in 2015.

They undertook their first tour of North America early in 2017, and followed in August with their next single, "Mind Off" featuring Kudu Blue. The duo released their debut album, What Comes Next, in June 2018, which peaked at No. 36 on the ARIA Albums Chart.

In the lead up to the release of their sophomore album, the duo released a string of singles with features by Ruel, Age.Sex.Location, and Matthew Young. Yesteryear was released in October 2020.

On 20 August 2021, Cosmo's Midnight released their first single of 2021, saying "'Titanic' kind of feels like a thematic progression from Yesteryear. It's reflecting on past regrets but instead of Yesteryear where it's kind of got this hint of optimism to it, 'Titanic' is kind of pessimistic. It's like the moment just before everything spirals downwards."

In April 2024, Cosmo's Midnight announced the release of their third studio album, Stop Thinking Start Feeling.

== Discography ==
=== Studio albums ===
List of studio albums, with release date, label, and selected chart positions shown
| Title | Album details | Peak chart positions |
| Title | Album details | AUS |
|---|---|---|
| What Comes Next | Released: 15 June 2018; Label: Site High, Sony Music Australia; Formats: CD, vinyl, digital download, streaming | 36 |
| Yesteryear | Released: 2 October 2020; Label: Sony Music Australia; Formats: Vinyl, digital download, streaming | 42 |
| Stop Thinking Start Feeling | Released: 24 May 2024; Label: Sony Music Australia; Formats: Vinyl, digital download, streaming | — (Note: Stop Thinking Start Feeling did not enter the ARIA Top 100 Albums Chart, but peaked at number 16 on the Australian Artists Album Chart.) |

=== Extended plays ===
List of EPs, with release date and label shown
| Title | Details |
|---|---|
| Surge | Released: 7 June 2013; Label: Yes Please; Formats: Digital download |
| Moments | Released: 4 December 2015; Label: Site High, Sony Music Australia; Formats: CD, digital download |

=== Singles ===
==== As lead artist ====
List of singles as lead artist, with year released, selected chart positions and certifications, and album name shown
| Title | Year | Peak chart positions | | | Certifications | Album |
| Title | Year | AUS | LAT Air. (Note: Since January 2023, Latvian airplay charts have been published by both the LaIPA and TopHit. Peak chart positions are primarily taken from LaIPA where available. However, as the LaIPA chart is limited to 20 positions, TopHit data (which has 100 positions) are also used when a song does not appear in the LaIPA Top 20 but charted within the TopHit Top 100.) | NZ Hot | Certifications | Album |
|---|---|---|---|---|---|---|
| "Phantasm" (featuring Nicole Millar) | 2013 | — | * | — | | Surge |
| "Goodnight" / "Moshi" | 2013 | — | * | — | | Surge |
| "Snare" (featuring Wild Eyed Boy) | 2014 | — | * | — | | Moments |
| "Walk with Me" (featuring Kučka) | 2015 | — | * | — | ARIA: Gold | Moments |
| "History" | 2017 | — | * | — | ARIA: Gold | What Comes Next |
| "Mind Off" (featuring Kudu Blue) | 2017 | — | * | — | | Non-album single |
| "Get to Know" (featuring Winston Surfshirt) | 2018 | — | — | — | ARIA: Gold | What Comes Next |
| "Polarised" | 2018 | — | — | — | | What Comes Next |
| "Talk to Me" (featuring Tove Styrke) | 2018 | — | — | — | ARIA: Gold | What Comes Next |
| "Lowkey" (featuring Buddy and Jay Prince) | 2018 | — | — | — | | What Comes Next |
| "C.U.D.I. (Can U Dig It)" | 2019 | — | — | — | ARIA: Platinum; RMNZ: Gold | Yesteryear |
| "Have It All" (featuring Age.Sex.Location) | 2019 | — | — | 28 | | Yesteryear |
| "It's Love" (featuring Matthew Young) | 2019 | — | — | — | | Yesteryear |
| "Down for You" (with Ruel) | 2020 | — | — | 9 | | Yesteryear |
| "Yesteryear" | 2020 | — | — | 40 | | Yesteryear |
| "Idaho" | 2020 | — | — | — | | Yesteryear |
| "Titanic" | 2021 | — | — | — | | Non-album singles |
| "Feel Good" (with Jitwam) | 2021 | — | — | — | | Non-album singles |
| "Straight Up Relaxin'" (with Yung Bae) | 2021 | — | — | — | | Non-album singles |
| "Can't Do Without (My Baby)" | 2022 | — | — | 33 | | Stop Thinking, Start Feeling |
| "Bang My Line" (featuring Tkay Maidza) | 2022 | — | — | — | | Stop Thinking, Start Feeling |
| "Breakthrough" (with Sirup and Shin Sakiura)) | 2022 | — | — | — | | Non-album single |
| "Gimme Some More" (featuring Shungudzo) | 2023 | — | — | — | | Stop Thinking, Start Feeling |
| "Borrowed Time" (featuring Forest Claudette) | 2023 | — | — | — | | Stop Thinking, Start Feeling |
| "Fantasy" (featuring Frank Moody) | 2024 | — | — | — | | Stop Thinking, Start Feeling |
| "Chance on You" (featuring Kučka) | 2024 | — | — | — | | Stop Thinking, Start Feeling |
| "Telephone" | 2024 | — | — | — | | Stop Thinking, Start Feeling |
| "Hold On (Young Heart)" | 2025 | — | 20 | — | | TBA |
| "Whine It Up" (featuring Warrior Queen) | 2025 | — | — | — | | TBA |
| "P4M" | 2025 | — | — | — | | TBA |
| "45" | 2025 | — | 93 | 14 | | TBA |
| "I Don't Wanna Fight" (remix) (with The Bamboos) | 2026 | — | — | — | | TBA |
| "Last October" | 2026 | — | — | — | | TBA |
| "Do You Want This" (with Vancouver Sleep Clinic) | 2026 | — | — | — | | |
"—" denotes items which were not released in that country or failed to chart. "*" denotes that the chart did not exist at that time.

==== As featured artist ====
List of singles as featured artist, with year released, selected chart positions and certifications, and album name shown
| Title | Year | Peak chart positions | Album |
| Title | Year | NZ Hot | Album |
|---|---|---|---|
| "How Does It Feel" (Baynk featuring Cosmo's Midnight) | 2021 | 27 | Adolescence |
"—" denotes releases that did not chart or were not released in that territory.

== Awards and nominations ==
=== AIR Awards ===
The Australian Independent Record Awards (commonly known informally as AIR Awards) is an annual awards night to recognise, promote and celebrate the success of Australia's Independent Music sector.

| Year | Nominee / work | Award | Result | Ref. |
|---|---|---|---|---|
| 2026 | "45" | Best Independent Electronic Single | Nominated | |

=== APRA Awards ===
The APRA Awards are held in Australia and New Zealand by the Australasian Performing Right Association to recognise songwriting skills, sales and airplay performance by its members annually.

| Year | Nominee / work | Award | Result | Ref. |
|---|---|---|---|---|
| 2023 | "Bang My Line" (featuring Tkay Maidza) | Most Performed R&B / Soul Work of the Year | Nominated | |

=== ARIA Music Awards ===
The ARIA Music Awards is an annual ceremony presented by Australian Recording Industry Association (ARIA), which recognise excellence, innovation, and achievement across all genres of the music of Australia. They commenced in 1987.

| Year | Nominee / work | Award | Result | Ref. |
|---|---|---|---|---|
| 2021 | Yesteryear | Best Dance Release | Nominated | |
