= Get to Know (song) =

2018 single by Cosmo's Midnight

Single by Cosmo's Midnight featuring Winston Surfshirt

from the album What Comes Next
- Released: 16 February 2018
- Length: 4:01
- Label: Cosmo's Midnight, Sony
- Songwriter(s): Cosmo Liney; Patrick Liney; Brett Ramson
- Producer(s): Cosmo's Midnight

Cosmo's Midnight singles chronology
"Mind Off" (2017)	"Get to Know" (2018)	"Polarised" (2018)

Winston Surfshirt singles chronology
"21 Questions" (2017)	"Get to Know" (2018)	"For the Record" (2018)

Music video
- "Get to Know" on YouTube

"Get to Know" is a song by Australian electronic music duo Cosmo's Midnight featuring Get to Know, released in February 2018 as the second single from their debut studio album What Comes Next. The song was certified gold in Australia in July 2019.

== Reception ==
Hayden Davies from Pile Rats said "'Get to Know' is another glitzy, funk-fuelled gem from Cosmo's, with the production twins combining a Kaytranada-esque, wonky bassline with clanging percussion and their characteristically bright synth work for the track's summery instrumental, which slides in perfectly underneath Winston's oozing, R&B-tinged vocal line." Davies continued saying, "It really showcases the best of both Cosmo's Midnight and Winston Surfshirt without either party coming across as too dominative and controlling – a sign of a perfect collaboration".

== Certifications ==
Certifications for "Get to Know"
Region	Certification	Certified units/sales
Australia (ARIA)	Gold	35,000^{‡}
^{‡} Sales+streaming figures based on certification alone.
