= Talk to Me (Cosmo's Midnight song) =

2018 single by Cosmo's Midnight

Single by Cosmo's Midnight featuring Tove Styrke

from the album What Comes Next
- Released: 5 October 2018
- Label: Cosmo's Midnight, Sony
- Songwriter(s): Cosmo Liney; Patrick Liney; Sarah Aarons
- Producer(s): Cosmo's Midnight

Cosmo's Midnight singles chronology
"Mind Off" (2017)	"Talk to Me" (2018)	"Polarised" (2018)

Tove Styrke singles chronology
"Been There Done That" (2018)	"Talk to Me" (2018)	"Vibe" (2018)

Music video
- "Talk to Me " on YouTube

"Talk to Me " is a song by Australian electronic music duo Cosmo's Midnight featuring Swedish singer Tove Styrke. It was sent to radio in October 2018 as the fourth single from their debut studio album What Comes Next. The song was certified gold in Australia in October 2019.

The song was recorded during Styrke's Australian promotional tour.

== Certifications ==
Certifications for "Get to Know"
Region	Certification	Certified units/sales
Australia (ARIA)	Gold	35,000^{‡}
^{‡} Sales+streaming figures based on certification alone.
