= C.U.D.I. (Can U Dig It) =

2019 single by Cosmo's Midnight

Single by Cosmo's Midnight

from the album Yesteryear
- Released: 1 March 2019
- Length: 3:43
- Label: Sony
- Songwriters: Cosmo Liney; Patrick Liney; Sophie Curtis
- Producer: Cosmo's Midnight

Cosmo's Midnight singles chronology
"Lowkey" (2018)	"C.U.D.I. (Can U Dig It)" (2019)	"Have It All" (2019)

Music video
- "C.U.D.I. (Can U Dig It)" on YouTube

"C.U.D.I. (Can U Dig It)" is a song by the Australian electronic music duo Cosmo's Midnight, released in March 2019 as the lead single from their second studio album Yesteryear. The song was certified platinum in Australia in 2024.

The song was written on New Year's Day, when the duo had returned from a festival in Wollongong. Patrick Liney said, "[We] were all hungover and just went to sit on our balcony and ended up writing 'Can U Dig It'."

== Reception ==
Acid Stag said, "Brimming from the funk inspired guitars and thumping percussion, 'C.U.D.I (Can U Dig It)' achieves a glowing outset full of positivity courtesy of its upbeat nature. With the smooth bass line oozing charisma, Cosmo's Midnight nail all the necessary elements for a well polished track, which is further heightened by the glistening vocals on offer."

== Remixes ==
- Friendly Fires remix - 4:49
- KISSTRAXX remix - 4:06

== Certifications ==
Certifications for "C.U.D.I. (Can U Dig It)"
Region	Certification	Certified units/sales
Australia (ARIA)	Platinum	70,000^{‡}
New Zealand (RMNZ)	Gold	15,000^{‡}
^{‡} Sales+streaming figures based on certification alone.
