= Emily Burns =

British singer-songwriter (born 1994)

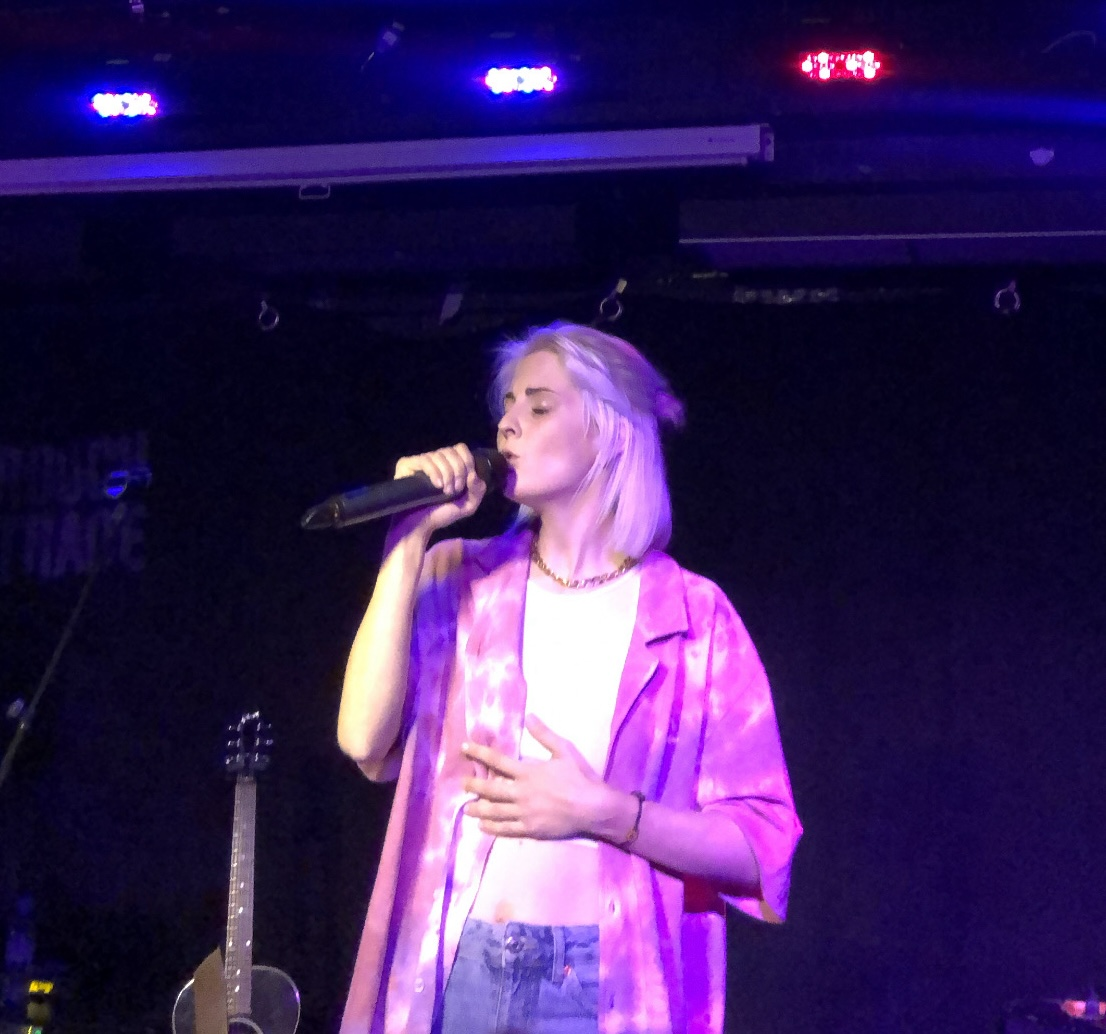

Background information
- Born: 22 September 1994 (age 32); Livingston, West Lothian, Scotland
- Origin: Rugby, Warwickshire, England
- Genre: Pop
- Occupation: Singer-songwriter
- Labels: SO Recordings; Silva Screen Records

Emily Burns (born 22 September 1994) is a British singer-songwriter. Her music style is influenced by artists such as Tove Lo, Kehlani, Sigrid and Banks. Her debut studio album, Die Happy, was released on 8 November 2024.

== Background ==
Burns was born in Livingston, West Lothian, Scotland, but raised at Rugby, Warwickshire, England, where she attended Rugby High School for Girls.

== Career ==
Burns entered the Live and Unsigned competition in 2010, reaching the final to perform at the indigO2. She was subsequently invited to attended a masterclass at Abbey Road Studios, where inhouse producer Rob Cass signed Burns to Cave Productions, leading to the release of the single "Plasters, Glitter and Glue".

She performed at numerous festivals, including a tour of the Czech Republic and appearances on two different stages at the Secret Garden Party. Emily also had a slot on the BBC introducing stage at T in the Park in July 2013, which led to "Plasters, Glitter and Glue" being play listed on BBC Radio 1. Burns also performed on SB.TV and Mahogany Sessions in 2013.

Burns played at BBC Radio 1's Big weekend in Middlesbrough in 2019. She started working as a receptionist at Abbey Road Studios in 2014, which led to meeting producer Sound Of Fractures, who produced her first major single "Take It Or Leave It", which was released in November 2016.

Burns signed to record label 37 Adventures in July 2017 and released her first single with the label, "Bitch", in January 2018 followed by her second single, "Girlfriend At The Time", in March 2018. She released her first mini album Seven Scenes From The Same Summer, in July 2018. Burns released two four track EPs throughout 2019, PDA and My Town, the latter being released after her signing to Island Records. On 24 April 2020, Burns released "Press Pause". She released a third EP, I Love You, You're The Worst, in July 2020.

In 2021, Burns released a remix of her 2019 track "Is It Just Me?" with JP Cooper, as well as single "I'm So Happy". She toured the UK in September 2021, after her tour in 2020 was delayed due to the COVID-19 pandemic.

On 27 September 2023, Burns released "Balcony Floor". It was her first single signed to SO Recordings and Silva Screen Records, after leaving Island Records. Burns later released "Cheating On Her" on November 22.

On 23 May 2024, Burns released "8 Hours Behind". On 3 July 2024, Burns released "Give and Take". On 29 August 2024, Burns released "Die Happy", announcing that her debut album of the same name would be released on 8 November 2024. On 3 October 2024, Burns released "Are You Waiting?", the final single before the album was released in November.

== Discography ==
=== Studio albums ===
Title	Details
Die Happy	Released: 8 November 2024; Label: SO Recordings / Silva Screen; Format: Digital download

=== Extended plays / mini-albums ===
Title	Details
Seven Scenes from the Same Summer	Released: 25 July 2018; Label: 37 Adventures; Format: Digital download
PDA	Released: 19 June 2019; Label: Emily Burns; Format: Digital download
My Town	Released: 20 November 2019; Label: Island Records; Format: Digital download
I Love You, You're The Worst	Released: 24 July 2020; Label: Island Records; Format: Digital download, vinyl
