= Västerbottens Folkblad =

Swedish newspaper

- Type: Daily newspaper
- Format: Tabloid
- Editor-in-chief: Daniel Nordström
- Founded: 1917; 108 years ago
- Language: Swedish
- Headquarters: Umeå, Sweden
- Circulation: 12,300 (2010)
- Sister newspapers: Västerbottens-Kuriren
- ISSN: 1104-0238
- Website: www.folkbladet.nu

Västerbottens Folkblad is a Swedish language newspaper published in Umeå, Sweden.

== History and profile ==
Västerbottens Folkblad was founded in 1917. It is published in Umeå, Västerbotten and covers regional news from Västerbotten.

In 2001 the company which owns Västerbottens-Kuriren, another newspaper in Umeå, acquired 50% of the paper. Two years later the company became the majority owner of the paper with 91% of its share.

In 2010 the circulation of Västerbottens Folkblad was 12,300 copies.
