= Endless (VAX song) =

2018 single by Swedish trio VAX

Single by VAX featuring Tove Styrke
- Released: 16 February 2018
- Length: 3:25
- Label: A-P; Sony Music
- Songwriter(s): Anders Frøen; Brian Lee; Jason Gill; Jesper Borgen
- Producer(s): Gill

VAX singles chronology
"Fireproof" (2017)	"Endless" (2018)	"Bubblegum" (2018)

Tove Styrke singles chronology
"Changed My Mind" (2018)	"Endless" (2018)	"On the Low" (2018)

"Endless" is a song by Swedish trio VAX featuring Tove Styrke. The song was released by A-P Records and Sony Music on 16 February 2018. It was written by Anders Frøen, Brian Lee, Jason Gill, and Jesper Borgen, with production by Gill. "Endless" peaked at number 76 on the Sverigetopplistan singles chart.

== Track listing ==
- Digital download
1. "Endless" – 3:25
- Digital download
1. "Endless" (acoustic version) – 3:08

== Credits and personnel ==
Credits are adapted from Tidal.

- Anders Frøen – songwriting
- Brian Lee – songwriting
- Jason Gill – songwriting, production
- Jesper Borgen – songwriting, guitar
- Kevin Grainger – mixing, mastering

== Charts ==
Chart performance for "Endless"
Chart (2018)	Peak position
Sweden (Sverigetopplistan)	76

== Release history ==
Release dates and formats for "Endless"
Country	Date	Format	Version	Label	Ref.
Various	16 February 2018	Digital download; streaming	Original version	A-P; Sony Music	
Various	23 March 2018	Digital download; streaming	Acoustic version	A-P; Sony Music	
