= Värmlands Folkblad =

Swedish newspaper

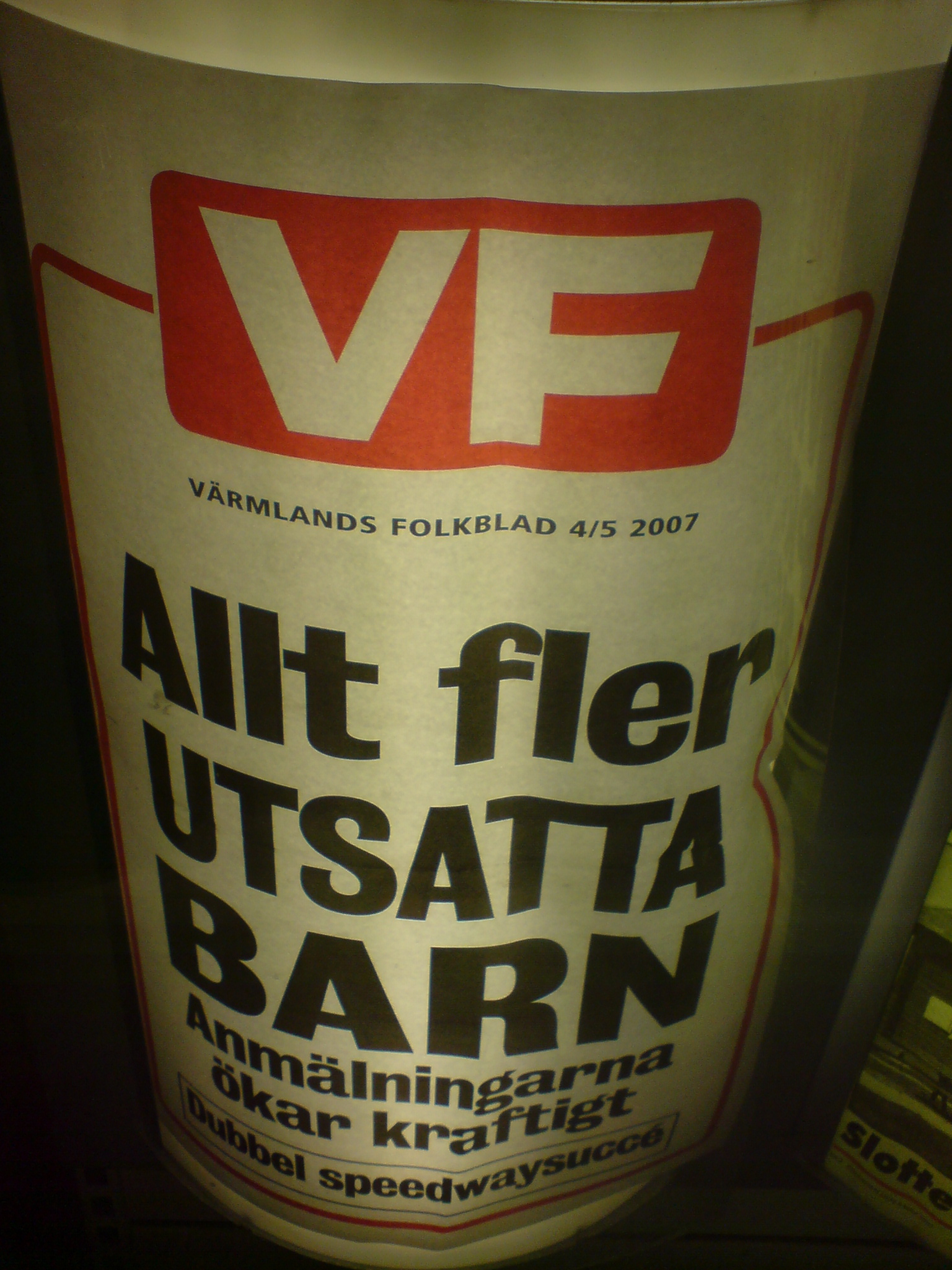
- 4 May 2007 edition
- Type: Daily newspaper
- Format: Tabloid
- Owner: Swedish Social Democratic Party
- Editor-in-chief: Peter Franke
- Founded: 1918
- Political alignment: Social democratic
- Language: Swedish
- Headquarters: Säterivägen 7, Karlstad
- ISSN: 1104-0203
- Website: www.vf.se

Värmlands Folkblad ("Värmland's People's Paper") is a Swedish language daily newspaper released in Värmland, Sweden.

== History and profile ==
Värmlands Folkblad was established in 1918. The paper has a social democratic political leaning. The present editor-in-chief is Peter Franke.

The circulation of the paper was 17,800 copies in 2011.
