= Mejeriet =

Cultural venue in Lund, Sweden

Coordinates: 55°41′46″N 13°11′18″E

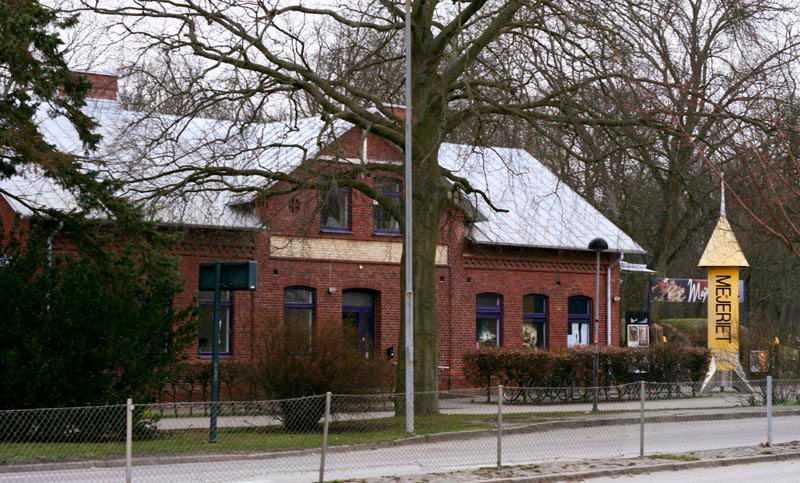
Mejeriet

Mejeriet, or Kulturmejeriet (the dairy), is a cultural venue in Lund, Sweden, which opened in 1987. It originally started as a co-operative dairy in 1896 by the corner of Malmövägen and the Lund-Revinge-Harlösa railroad. The dairy itself closed in 1968.

The venue has a full-service bar and restaurant, a cinema, a music school, 12 rehearsal rooms and two stages that since the inauguration has hosted concerts with music artists such as Jason Molina, Miles Davis, Bo Diddley, Bad Religion, NOFX, Ramones, Primal Scream, Sun Ra, George Clinton, Levellers, James, Alice in Chains, Massive Attack, Dead Prez, Miriam Makeba, The Stone Roses, Iggy Pop, Elvis Costello, Oasis, My Bloody Valentine, Dinosaur Jr., Sinéad O'Connor, Beach House, Johnossi, Rebecca & Fiona, The War on Drugs, Kurt Vile, The Sisters of Mercy, The Mission and many more. Mejeriet houses 675 people at maximum capacity.

The venue is run as a non-profit organization and works as an umbrella organization for the other non-profit members which in turn is responsible for the events at the venue.

Today, the venue arranges concerts, clubs, cinema viewings, exhibitions, and other cultural events.

Mejeriet is a member of Trans Europe Halles, a European network of independent cultural centres.
