= Say My Name (Tove Styrke song) =

2017 single by Tove Styrke

Single by Tove Styrke

from the album Sway
- Released: 28 April 2017
- Genre: Electropop; synth-pop
- Length: 3:23
- Label: Sony Music
- Songwriters: Tove Styrke; Elof Loelv; Tinashe "T Collar" Sibanda
- Producer: Loelv

Tove Styrke singles chronology
"Number One" (2015)	"Say My Name" (2017)	"Mistakes" (2017)

"Say My Name" is a song by Swedish singer Tove Styrke from her third studio album Sway (2018). It was released as the album's lead single on 28 April 2017 through Sony Music. The song was written by the singer, Elof Loelv and Tinashe "T Collar" Sibanda, with production by Loelv. "Say My Name" is a minimal electropop song with a prominent ukulele riff that Styrke convinced Loelv to integrate as a central part. She described the song as musically and lyrically different from the material of her previous studio album Kiddo (2015), and explained that working with Loelv helped her evolve her sound.

"Say My Name" received positive reviews from music critics, who noted its simplicity and praised its catchiness. Music magazine Rolling Stone selected the single as the eleventh-best-song of 2017, as well as the 91st-best-song of the 2010s decade. It was also nominated for Song of the Year at the 2017 Musikförläggarnas pris award ceremony. Commercially, the song managed to peak at number 85 on the Swedish singles chart, and marked Styrke's return to the chart following a six-year absence. The song's accompanying music video, directed by Daniel Skoglund, portrays the singer in colorful and simple sets with infinity mirror effects.

== Background ==
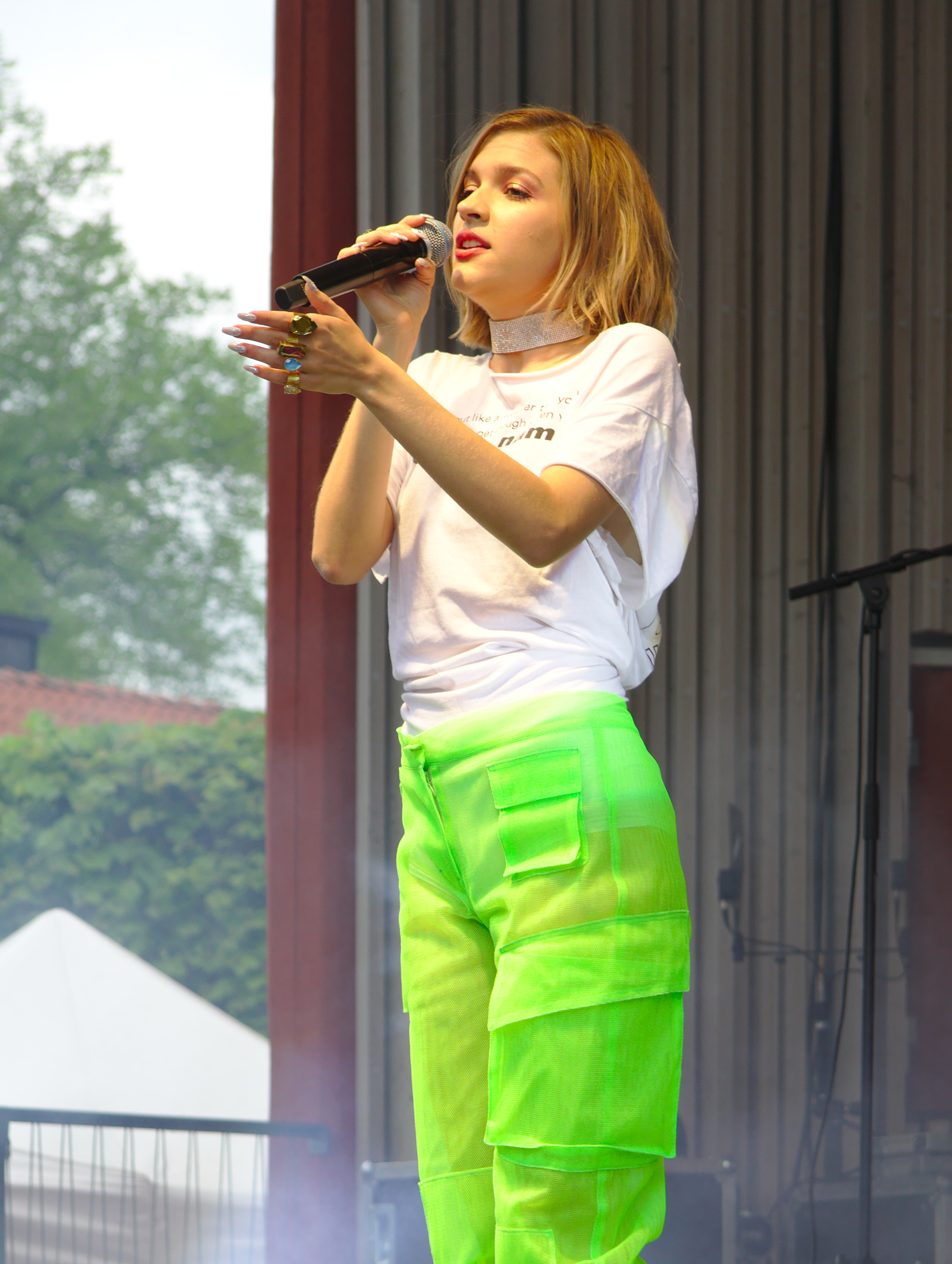
Styrke performing in 2018

For her third studio album Sway (2018), Tove Styrke wanted to "strip down production" while keeping the songs "interesting" with "[their] own I.D.[s]". She said "it's important to keep production sparse but make each song special". In the summer of 2016, Styrke met with Elof Loelv and Tinashe "T Collar" Sibanda for a session that resulted in "Say My Name" being written. It was the session's first conceptualized song to be finished. Initially, Loelv presented the song's eventual bass line, which made Styrke burst into laughter as "it wasn't even a beat, it was two notes", she revealed to Out. While writing, the trio were experimenting with various metaphors for saying somebody's name, including "Wear it out like a sweater that you love", which became part of the chorus. Styrke enjoyed the lyric to the point that they began forming the song around it, stating that the lyric "really set the tone for the whole thing". Loelv came up with the ukulele riff by accident and was reluctant to include it, but Styrke liked it and had to convince him to integrate it as a central part of the track.

Styrke and Loelv reportedly spent several months "perfecting" the song, as Styrke wanted to ensure they would put their best effort into it. They spent two days recording the handclaps featured in the song. She told Pigeons & Planes that "it usually takes [them] a long time to complete a song but in the end it's so worth it". The song was finished in December 2016. In an interview for Time, she described "Say My Name" as "like a starting point of a new era", and further elaborated on working with Loelv, "I had been writing a lot prior to that, but it wasn't until I met Elof that it really clicked for me. Sometimes you need somebody to snap you out of your comfort zone to get better at whatever it is you're doing." Styrke explained that the song differs from the material of her second studio album Kiddo (2015), which was "all about being loud and big", whereas "Say My Name" is "close and simple". She said, "The trick is to be expressive and chill at the same time. For example, finding nuances in the voice instead of adding another instrument. And to me there's edginess in being just annoyingly damn sparse as well."

== Composition and lyrics ==
"Say My Name"
A 20-second sample of "Say My Name", showcasing its chorus backed by minimal production and the ukulele riff.

Musically, "Say My Name" is an electropop & synth-pop song with dancehall and funk influences and a prominent ukulele riff. Erica Russell, writing for PopCrush, said the track includes "a textural, strummy string riff and a follow-the-bouncing-ball beat". Music commentators characterized the production as "deceptively simple", and Styrke described it as "minimal". Writer Issy Beech of Noisey viewed the track as "bouncing" and "offbeat", while Idolator's Mike Wass noted a change of pace from Kiddo, writing that Styrke "explores a warmer, more organic soundscape".

Lyrically, "Say My Name" speaks of an instant infatuation. The chorus includes the lines "Say my name / Wear it out like a sweater that you love / 'cause I can't get enough when you / Say my name". Styrke elaborated to Time that the song's protagonist is "just completely comfortable with themselves". Regarding its love theme, she explained to NME that she had previously avoided writing about the topic as she did not want to pen "another love song". However, she changed her mind for "Say My Name" as she was "tired of being angry", opting for music that makes her "feel good". She said, "There's a reason why so much music is about sex and love. It is linked to one's worst and best experiences."

== Release ==
Styrke said to Pigeons & Planes that selecting "Say My Name" as the lead single for Sway was a "no-brainer", stating that "it really raised the bar in every way". In the days prior to its release, the singer posted lyrics and snippets of the song on her social media. The full track became available for digital download and streaming on 28 April 2017 through Sony Music. The single's artwork depicts an illustrated cherry, which Styrke chose because she was "really into that emoji" and believed it fit well with the song. Upon its release, "Say My Name" debuted at number 85 on the Swedish singles chart on 5 May 2017 and remained on the ranking for a week. This marked Styrke's first appearance on the chart since "Call My Name" entered in 2011. The single also charted below the top 50 of the Flemish Ultratip chart as an "extra tip" for four weeks. An acoustic version produced by Swedish musician Björn Yttling premiered on 16 June 2017. Another digital release subtitled Remixes was made available on 14 July 2017. The set includes three remixes by Franklin, Kretsen and Leon Lour. Additionally, RCA issued a CD single of "Say My Name" for promotional purposes.

== Reception ==
"Say My Name" was met with positive reviews. Issy Beech, writing for Noisey, wrote positively of the song and complimented the lyrical content, arguing that "[Styrke] has practically bottled warm weather and lust for life. She's bottled sex. She's bottled having a crush. She's bloody well managed to bottle how it feels to be a full, feeling human being." Mike Wass of Idolator viewed the single as "devastatingly catchy", and Variance's Lindsay Howard described it as a "glossy, summery cut". Thomas Smith of NME opined that the song "oozes confidence and a star power that is ready to permeate and resonate with a wider audience". Rolling Stone's Maura Johnston wrote that its "triumphant chorus ... makes love seem like the best kind of high".

Rolling Stone included "Say My Name" on their "50 Best Songs of 2017" list compiled by several writers, placing it at number eleven. The writers deemed it a "fiendishly catchy" song "sung with wild Nordic verve". Regarding the chorus, they wrote, "It's the best pop hook about cozy winterwear since Weezer's "Undone (The Sweater Song)." In December 2019, the magazine named the song the 91st-best-song of the 2010s decade. In 2017, "Say My Name" was nominated for the Song of the Year award at the Musikförläggarnas pris awards ceremony, hosted annually by the Swedish Music Publishers Association in honor of Swedish songwriters, lyricists and composers. Ultimately, "Sexual" by Neiked and Dyo won the award.

== Music video ==
Daniel Skoglund directed the accompanying music video for "Say My Name". It was produced by ACNE Production, with Tim Mardell as the producer, William Tornwall as the production manager and Stefan Ström as the editor. David Grehn was the cinematographer and Nicke Lund was in charge of the set design. In an interview for Out, Styrke said she envisioned the video as "bold, bright and crisp", as well as "simple, but also playful and not boring". Mirrors play a central part in the video as she deemed them symbols of self-appreciation. She worked extensively with the color scheme as she wanted the visual to "pop". The video sees Styrke dancing in minimal sets of various saturated colors. Several shots has the singer dancing among parallel mirrors, which create an infinity mirror effect. The visual premiered on 11 May 2017 via Styrke's YouTube channel.

== In popular culture ==
"Say My Name" has been featured in the following television series.

British drama series Save Me, "Episode 3" (2018).

American superhero miniseries She-Hulk: Attorney at Law, episode 5: "Mean, Green, and Straight Poured into These Jeans" (2022).

American superhero series Gotham Knights, episode 11: "Daddy Issues" (2023).

== Formats and track listing ==
- Digital download
1. "Say My Name" – 3:23
- Digital download
1. "Say My Name" (acoustic version) – 3:23
- Digital download – Remixes
1. "Say My Name" (Franklin remix) – 3:11
2. "Say My Name" (Kretsen remix) – 2:49
3. "Say My Name" (Leon Lour remix) – 3:44
- Promotional CD single
1. "Say My Name" – 3:23

== Credits and personnel ==
Credits are adapted from Tidal.

- Tove Styrke – songwriting
- Elof Loelv – songwriting, production, bass guitar, clapping, drums, percussion, programming, synthesizer, ukulele
- Tinashe "T Collar" Sibanda – songwriting
- Henrik Edenhed – mixing
- Tom Coyne – mastering

== Charts ==
Chart performance for "Say My Name"
Chart (2017)	Peak position
Belgium (Ultratip Flanders)	— (Note: "Say My Name" did not enter the Ultratip 50, but charted below it as an "extra tip".)
Sweden (Sverigetopplistan)	85

== Release history ==
Release dates and formats for "Say My Name"
Country	Date	Format	Version	Label	Ref.
Various	28 April 2017	Digital download; streaming	Original	Sony Music	
Sweden	4 May 2017	Radio airplay	Original	Sony Music	
Various	16 June 2017	Digital download; streaming	Acoustic	Sony Music	
Various	14 July 2017	Digital download; streaming	Remixes	Sony Music	
