= Nyhetsmorgon =

Swedish morning news and talk show

- Also known as: Gomorron (1992–1994)
- Genre: News
- Country of origin: Sweden
- Original language: Swedish

Original release
- Network: TV4
- Release: 14 September 1992

Nyhetsmorgon is a Swedish morning news and talk show that is broadcast every morning on TV4. Nyhetsmorgon started airing on 14 September 1992.
