= Variance (magazine) =

Oklahoma-based online music magazine

- Website type: Online music & entertainment magazine
- Creator: Jonathan Robles
- Website: variancemagazine.com
- Launched: 2010
- Current status: Active

Variance is an online music and entertainment magazine, co-founded by Jonathan Robles in 2010 and based in Tulsa, Oklahoma. It also publishes a print magazine with past features including The Killers' Brandon Flowers, J. Cole, Ellie Goulding, Robin Thicke, Foster the People, and Ed Sheeran.

== Year-End Reviews ==
=== Album of the Year ===
Year	Artist	Album	Source
2012	Frank Ocean	Channel Orange	
2013	James Blake	Overgrown	
2014	Run the Jewels	Run the Jewels 2	
2015	Tame Impala	Currents	
2016	Chance the Rapper	Coloring Book	
2017	SZA	Ctrl	
