= Nya Wermlands-Tidningen =

Newspaper published in Värmland, Sweden

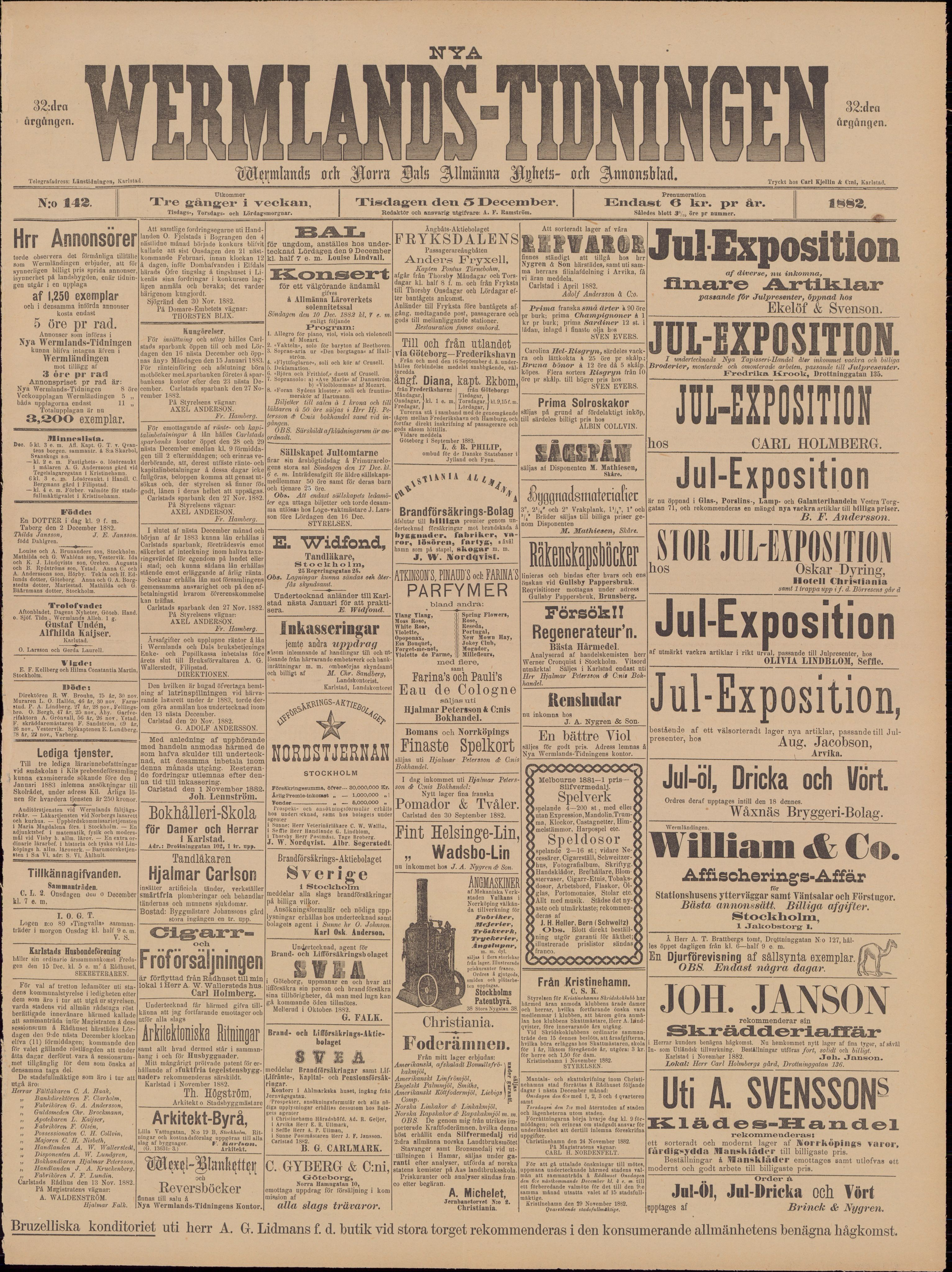
- Type: Daily newspaper
- Format: Compact
- Owner: Nya Wermlands-Tidningens AB
- Editor-in-chief: Staffan Ander
- Founded: 4 January 1837; 188 years ago
- Political alignment: Conservative
- Language: Swedish
- Headquarters: Karlstad, Sweden
- ISSN: 1103-985X
- Website: www.nwt.se

Nya Wermlands-Tidningen (meaning "The New Värmland Newspaper" in English), shortened NWT, is a Swedish local newspaper distributed in the provinces of Värmland, Dalsland and western Dalarna.

== History and profile ==
The newspaper was founded as Wermlands Tidning (meaning "Newspaper of Värmland" in English) in Karlstad, Värmland, where it still has its headquarters. The first issue of the newspaper was published on 4 January 1837. While other newspapers already existed in the province, Wermlands Tidning quickly became the most printed. The word "New" was added because the newspaper was banned in 1842 because of Indragningsmakten, the right of the government to before 1844 ban the publication of a newspaper, which was circumvented by a restart with a slight name change.

On 2 May 2005, the format of the newspaper was changed from broadsheet to compact.

On 3 April 2007, the political position of the editorial page was changed from "moderate" (liberal-conservative) to "conservative", in what the newspaper stated was an attempt to mark its independence from any political parties (i.e. the Swedish Moderate Party). It's the only Swedish newspaper with the label "conservative".
