= Västerbottens-Kuriren =

Swedish newspaper founded in 1900

- Type: Daily newspaper
- Format: Tabloid
- Owner: Stiftelsen VK-press
- Editor-in-chief: Marcus Melinder
- Staff writers: 199 (December 2012)
- Founded: 17 May 1900; 126 years ago
- Language: Swedish
- Headquarters: Umeå, Sweden
- Circulation: 30,800 (2013)
- ISSN: 1104-0246
- Website: www.vk.se (Swedish)

Västerbottens-Kuriren (also known as VK) is a Swedish newspaper founded in 1900. It is published in Umeå, Västerbotten, Sweden. The newspaper covers regional news from the Västerbotten region (with the exception of the municipalities Mala, Norsjö and Skellefteå), with a special focus on the hometown Umeå, in combination with national and international news.

== Rosén era ==
VK published its first issue on 17 May 1900. The paper grew rapidly, and became the largest newspaper in Västerbotten County in 1903 – a position it has held since. Among the early journalists involved with the newspaper was the author Astrid Väring.

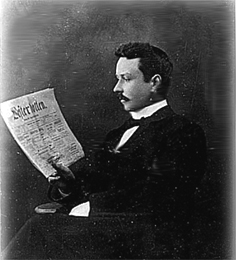
Rosén owned this newspaper

Gustav Rosén, who played an important role in the history of Sweden's Folkpartiet (Liberal People's Party) was the executive director until 1926, when he was appointed as Minister of Defence in Carl Gustav Ekman's first cabinet. His successor Ernst Gafvelin died after just six months, after which Rosén's only son, Stellan Rosén, took over as editor and publisher at the age of 23. Following the resignation of the Ekman government in September 1928, Gustav Rosén returned to Umeå – first as political editor of VK and from 1931 until his death in 1942 as county governor of Västerbotten County.

== Bäckström era ==
In 1929 Rosén sold the majority of his shares to master builder J. M. Bäckström, who began building a new publishing house the following year at the block Rind, at Rådhusesplanaden 10 in central Umeå. The VK building was completed by the end of 1930–1931 and housed VK until 1988. In 1949 VK was the first news paper in Norrland to hire its own press photographer, Harry Lindwall, who would remain in service until his retirement in 1985.

VK was owned by the Bäckström family until 1971, 15 years after the death of J. M. Bäckström. After a disagreement between the Sundsvall branch of the heirs (who wanted to sell) and the Umeå branch (who wanted to keep the VK as a liberal and freethinking newspaper) the paper was first sold to the small printing company Folk och Samhälle (People and Society) and later around 1978 to the Stiftelsen VK-Press (VK-Press Foundation).

== Modern era ==
In 1982, VK bought land in the industrial area Västerslätt to build a new printing house. The printing house got a boost when the newspaper Dagens Nyheter decided to have their Norrland edition printed there. The printing house was opened in autumn 1984 and a few years later, in 1988, another printing house in the same area.

In the 1990s and 2000s VK faced competition from the Norrländska Socialdemokraten (NSD, Norrland Social-Democrats) based in Luleå for the title of largest daily news paper of Norrland. VK also became the majority owner of its competitor Västerbottens Folkblad in 2001. In 2003 the ownership increased to 91%.

In 2003 VK acquired the magazine Nöjesmagasinet City, a free magazine focused on entertainment, trend and lifestyle published in different editions for Umeå, Sundsvall and Luleå.

In December 2012 VK had 199 staff.

The paper started the website VK.se in 1997, which was built by editor Tom Juslin. It was twice (2007 and 2008) nominated for the Stora Journalistpriset prize in the category Innovator of the Year.

== Circulation ==
The circulation of VK was 34,700 copies in 2010. The paper had a circulation of 32,400 copies in 2012 and 30,800 copies in 2013.

== VK-guldet ==
Since 1937 the newspaper annually honors the best athlete from Västerbotten with the so-called VK-guldet (VK Gold). Among the prizewinners are Ingemar Stenmark, Anja Pärson, Marta Vieira da Silva and Assar Rönnlund.

== Chief editors ==
- Gustav Rosén, 1902–1926
- Ernst Gafvelin, 1926–1927
- Stellan Rosén, 1927–1967
- Matts Balgård, 1968–1973
- Olle Nilsson, 1973–1978
- Bengt Schöier, 1978–1986
- Olof Kleberg, 1986–2001 (political chief editor 1997–2001)
- Torbjörn Bergmark, 1997–2009
  - Ola Nordebo, 2006– (political chief editor)
- Sture Bergman, 2009–2011
- Ingvar Näslund, 2011–2017
- Jessica Wennberg, 2017–
