= Alma discography =

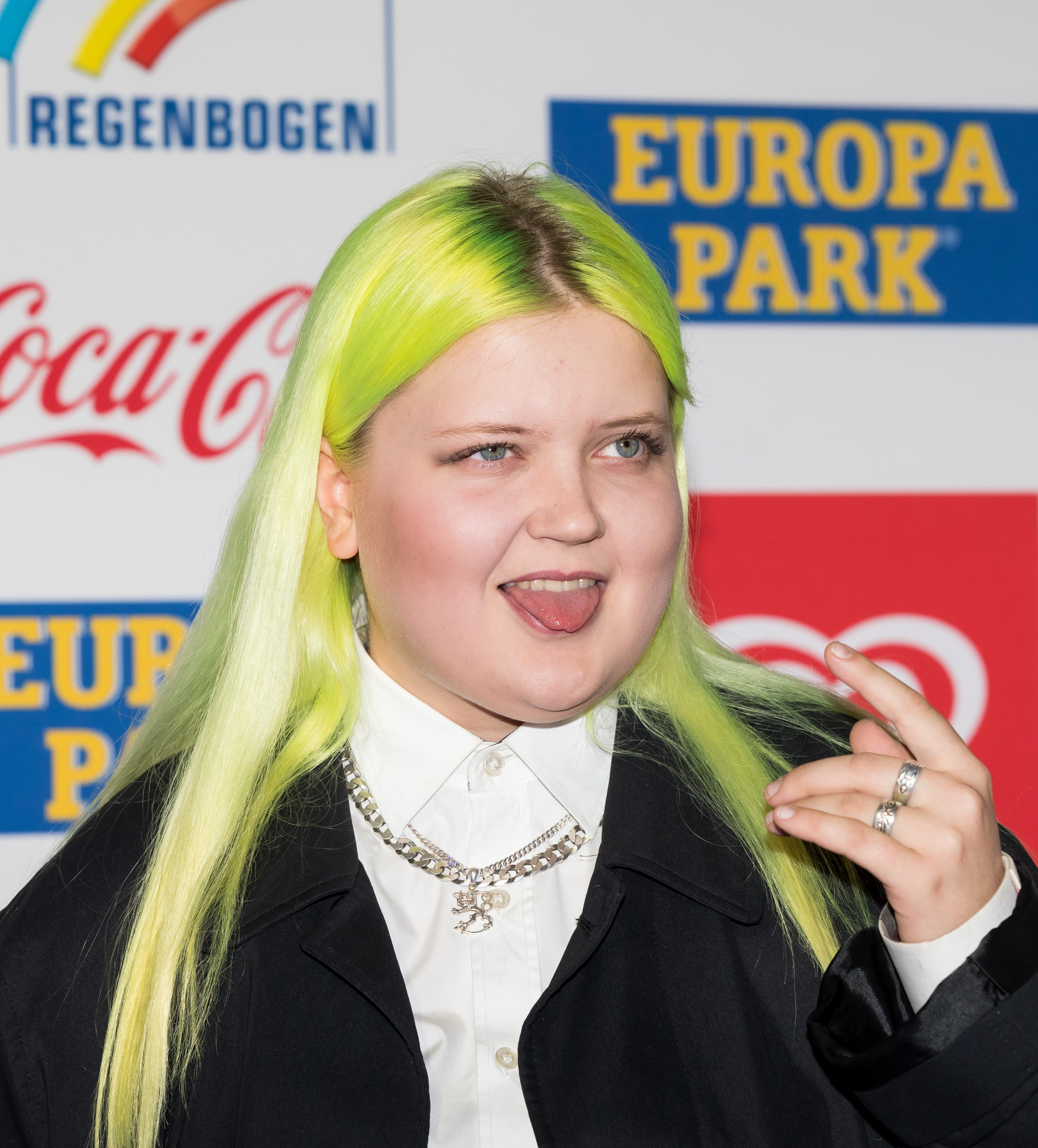
- Alma at Radio Awards in Regenbogen in March 2018
- Studio albums: 2
- EPs: 7
- Singles: 29
- Music videos: 26

The discography of Finnish singer-songwriter Alma consists of two studio albums, seven extended plays, 29 singles (including nine as a featured artist), three guest appearances and 26 music videos. In addition to her own releases, Alma has also been a songwriter for other artists including Miley Cyrus and Lindsay Lohan.

In 2016, Alma released her debut single "Karma" which is also a lead single from her debut EP Dye My Hair. The song as peaked at 5 on Finnish Chart becoming her highest charted track here to date. On the same year, she released a collaboration "Bonfire"" with German DJ Felix Jaehn which helped her to rose into the prominence. The track is also certified Gold in Austria and triple Gold in Germany.

In 2017, Alma released "Chasing Highs" which is her most streamed track accumulating almost 150 millions of streams which in result became her most successful track to date. It peaked at 18 on UK Singles Chart and is certified Platinum there and Gold in Germany.

On March 2, 2018 Alma dropped her second extended play Heavy Rules Mixtape which peaked at nine on Finnish Charts. Despite not being released as a track, "Good Vibes" with Swedish singer-songwriter Tove Styrke peaked at 91 on Swedish Charts. Additionally, the track is the most streamed one from this project.

Alma released her debut studio album Have U Seen Her? on May 15, 2020, through PME Records. The album was preceded by the release of two EPs: Have U Seen Her? (Part I) and Have U Seen Her? (Part I) as well as one track "Bad News Baby". The album peaked at number one on Finnish Charts.

She released her second studio album Time Machine on April 21, 2023, through PME and Epic Records. It was preceded by the release of five tracks and peaked at number ten on Finnish Charts.

== Studio albums ==
Title	Details	Peak chart positions
Title	Details	FIN
Have U Seen Her?	Released: 15 May 2020; Label: PME, Warner, Epic, RCA; Format: CD, LP, digital download, streaming	1
Time Machine	Released: 21 April 2023; Label: PME, Epic; Format: CD, digital download, streaming	10

== Extended plays ==
Title	Details	Peak chart positions	
Title	Details	FIN	SWE
Dye My Hair	Released: 28 October 2016; Label: PME, Virgin; Format: Digital download	—	—
Heavy Rules Mixtape	Released: 2 March 2018; Format: Digital download; Label: PME, Virgin	9	41
Heavy Rules Mixtape (Remixes)	Released: 29 June 2018; Format: Digital download; Label: PME, Virgin	—	—
Heavy Rules Mixtape (Acoustic)	Released: 6 July 2018; Format: Digital download; Label: PME, Virgin	—	—
Have U Seen Her? (Part 1)	Released: 1 November 2019; Label: PME; Format: Digital download	—	—
Have U Seen Her? (Part 2)	Released: 13 March 2020; Label: PME; Format: Digital download	—	—
Have U Seen Her? (Acoustic)	Released: 25 June 2020; Label: PME; Format: Digital download	—	—
"—" denotes a single that did not chart or was not released.

== Singles ==
=== As lead artist ===
Title	Year	Peak chart positions										Certifications	Album
Title	Year	FIN	FIN Radio	FIN Stream	AUT	DEN	GER	NZ Heat.	SWE	SWI	UK	Certifications	Album
"Karma"	2016	5	13	6	—	—	—	—	100	—	—		Dye My Hair
"Dye My Hair"	2016	5	6	5	26	38	25	—	—	—	—	BVMI: Gold; IFPI DEN: Gold	Dye My Hair
"Chasing Highs"	2017	10	7	10	22	—	17	—	—	43	18	BVMI: Gold; BPI: Platinum	Non-album singles
"Phases" (with French Montana)	2017	14	8	14	—	—	—	9	82	97	88		Non-album singles
"Cowboy"	2018	9	6	—	—	—	—	—	—	—	—		Non-album singles
"When I Die"	2019	20	74	—	—	—	—	—	—	—	—		Non-album singles
"Summer"	2019	—	—	—	—	—	—	—	—	—	—		Non-album singles
"Starlight"	2019	—	—	—	—	—	—	—	—	—	—		Moominvalley
"Lonely Night"	2019	—	17	—	—	—	—	—	—	—	—		Non-album single
"How It's Done" (with Kash Doll, Kim Petras and Stefflon Don)	2019	—	—	—	—	—	—	—	—	—	—		Charlie's Angels
"Bad News Baby"	2019	—	56	—	—	—	—	—	—	—	—		Have U Seen Her?
"Stay All Night"	2020	—	—	—	—	—	—	—	—	—	—		Have U Seen Her?
"LA Money"	2020	—	87	—	—	—	—	—	—	—	—		Have U Seen Her?
"Everything Beautiful"	2022	—	53	—	—	—	—	—	—	—	—		Time Machine
"I Forgive Me"	2022	—	—	—	—	—	—	—	—	—	—		Time Machine
"Summer Really Hurt Us"	2022	—	5	—	—	—	—	—	—	—	—		Time Machine
"Hey Mom Hey Dad"	2023	—	—	—	—	—	—	—	—	—	—		Time Machine
"Tell Mama"	2023	—	62	—	—	—	—	—	—	—	—		Time Machine
"Fake Friends" (with Slowboy and Digital Farm Animals)	2024	—	—	—	—	—	—	—	—	—	—		Non-album singles
"Life Must be Beautiful"	2024	—	—	—	—	—	—	—	—	—	—		Non-album singles
"Sprit & Blondiner" (with Silvana Imam)	2024	—	—	—	—	—	—	—	—	—	—		Tro
"—" denotes a single that did not chart or was not released.

=== As featured artist ===
Title	Year	Peak positions										Certifications	Album
Title	Year	FIN	FIN Radio	FIN Sales	AUT	FRA	GER	NL	SWE	SWI	US Dance	Certifications	Album
"Muuta ku mä" (Sini Sabotage featuring Alma)	2015	—	—	—	—	—	—	—	—	—	—		Lue mun huulilta
"Bonfire" (Felix Jaehn featuring Alma)	2016	14	2	3	9	120	3	100	62	39	43	BVMI: 3× Gold; AUT: Gold	I
"Don't You Feel It" (Sub Focus featuring Alma)	2017	—	—	7	—	—	—	—	—	—	—		Non-album singles
"All Stars" (Martin Solveig featuring Alma)	2017	—	—	—	24	11	33	—	—	94	40	BVMI: Gold; BPI: Silver	Non-album singles
"Out of My Head" (Charli XCX featuring Tove Lo and Alma)	2017	—	—	—	—	—	—	—	—	—	—		Pop 2
"Bitches" (Tove Lo featuring Charli XCX, Icona Pop, Elliphant and Alma)	2018	—	—	—	—	—	—	—	—	—	—		Blue Lips
"Black Car" (Acoustic) (Miriam Bryant featuring Alma)	2018	—	—	—	—	—	—	—	—	—	—		Non-album single
"Bad as the Boys" (Tove Lo featuring Alma)	2019	—	—	—	—	—	—	—	— (Note: "Bad as the Boys" did not enter the Swedish Singellista Chart, but peaked at number nine on the Swedish Heatseeker Chart.)	—	—		Sunshine Kitty
"Home Sweet Home" (Sam Feldt featuring Alma and Digital Farm Animals)	2020	—	—	—	—	—	—	—	—	—	—		Home Sweet Home
"—" denotes a single that did not chart or was not released.

== Other charted songs ==
Title	Year	Peak chart positions		Album
Title	Year	FIN Radio	SWE	Album
"Dance For Me" (featuring MØ)	2018	90	—	Heavy Rules Mixtape
"Good Vibes" (featuring Tove Styrke)	2018	—	91	Heavy Rules Mixtape

== Guest appearances ==
Title	Year	Other artist(s)	Album
"Welcome To My Life"	2013	None	Idols 2013
"Sanctify"	2018	Years & Years	Sanctify – Remixes
"In Us I Believe"	2018	Clean Bandit	What Is Love?
"Uuden edessä"	2020	Toivon kärki	Non-album single
"Hysteria"	2024	Brooke Candy	Spiral

== Music videos ==
Title	Year	Type	Director(s)	Ref.
As lead artist
"Karma"	2016	Official	Jens Alexander and Pyry Pelkonen	
"Dye My Hair"	2016	Official	Youth Hymns	
"Chasing Highs"	2017	Official	Thomas Trail	
"Phases"	2017	Official	Charli XCX	
"Cowboy"	2018	Official	Miikka Lommi	
"When I Die"	2019	Official	Miikka Lommi	
"Summer"	2019	Lyric	Miikka Lommi	
"Lonely Night"	2019	Official	Deni Cheng	
"Worst Behaviour" (with Tove Lo)	2019	Lyric	Unknown	
"Have U Seen Her?"	2019	Official	CyberAnna	
"Bad News Baby"	2019	Official	Unknown	
"King of the Castle"	2020	Lyric	LSK Productions	
"Find Me"	2020	Lyric	LSK Productions	
"Stay All Night"	2020	Official	ALMA	
"Mama"	2020	Lyric	Kiril Juha	
"Nightmare"	2020	Lyric	Kiril Juha	
"My Girl"	2020	Lyric	Kiril Juha	
"Final Fantasy"	2020	Lyric	Kiril Juha	
"Loser"	2020	Lyric	Kiril Juha	
"LA Money"	2020	Official	David Horsburgh	
"Everything Beautiful"	2022	Official	Nicolee Tsin	
"I Forgive Me"	2022	Official	CyberAnna and ALMA	
"Summer Really Hurt Us"	2022	Official	Tereza Mundilova	
"Hey Mom Hey Dad"	2023	Official	Miikka Lommi	
"Tell Mama"	2023	Official	Kiril Juha and ALMA	
"Natalia"	2023	Official	Niko Hirvimäki	
As featured artist
"Muuta ku mä" (featuring Sini Sabotage)	2015	Official	Unknown	
"Bonfire" (featuring Felix Jaehn)	2016	Official	Fridolin Schoepper	
"All Stars" (featuring Martin Solveig)	2017	Official	Thomas Lélu and Pierre Dixsaut	
"Bitches" (featuring Tove Lo, Charli XCX, Icona Pop and Elliphant)	2018	Official	Lucia Aniello	
"Black Car" (featuring Miriam Bryant)	2018	Acoustic	Unknown	
"Bad as the Boys" (featuring Tove Lo)	2019	Lyric	Garrett Guidera, Natalia Kallio, CyberAnna, Charlie Twaddle and Natalie Ziering	
"Home Sweet Home" (featuring Sam Feldt and Digital Farm Animals)	2020	Official	Unknown	

== Songwriting credits ==
indicates un-credited lead vocal contribution.
indicates single release

List of songs written or co-written by Alma for other artists
Song	Artist(s)	Other writer(s)	Originating album	Year	Ref.
"Back to Me"	Lindsay Lohan	Chiara Hunter; Mark Ralph		2020	
"Cashing Marrakech"	Zhu	Steven Zhu; Mitch Bell; Dante Jones	Stardustexhalemarrakechdreams	2017	
"Cattitude" (featuring RuPaul)"	Miley Cyrus	Miley Cyrus; Ilsey Juber; Andrew Wyatt; RuPaul Andre Charles	She Is Coming	2019	
"Don't Call Me Angel"	Ariana Grande; Miley Cyrus; Lana Del Rey	Ariana Grande; Miley Cyrus; Lana Del Rey; Savan Kotecha; Max Martin; Ilya Salmanzadeh	Charlie's Angels	2019	
"Dimenticherai"	Annalisa	Jacopo Ettorre; Michele Canova	Bye Bye	2018	
"Drunk on You"	Zookeepers	Joseph Walter; Pascal Reinhardt	—N/a	2017	
"Highride"	Nicole Cross	Johannes Walter-Müller; Pascal Reinhardt	Shapeshifter	2018	
"La Money"	—N/a	Andrew Wyatt; Nicholas Gale; Sarah Hudson; Miley Cyrus; Justin Tranter	—N/a	—N/a	
"Mother's Daughter"	Miley Cyrus	Miley Cyrus; Andrew Wyatt	She Is Coming	2019	
"Scared of Love" (featuring Ray BLK and Stefflon Don)	Rudimental	Amir Izadkhah; Kesi Dryden; Piers Aggett; Leon "DJ Locksmith" Rolle; Cass Lowe; Stephanie Allen	Toast to Our Differences	2019	
"Slide Away"	Miley Cyrus	Miley Cyrus; Andrew Wyatt; Michael Wiliams II	She Is Here	2019	
"Sunday Morning" (featuring Josie Dunne)	Matoma	Thomas Lagergren; Jason Dean; Joseph Kirkland; Jurek Reunamaki	One in a Million	2018	
