= Felix Jaehn discography =

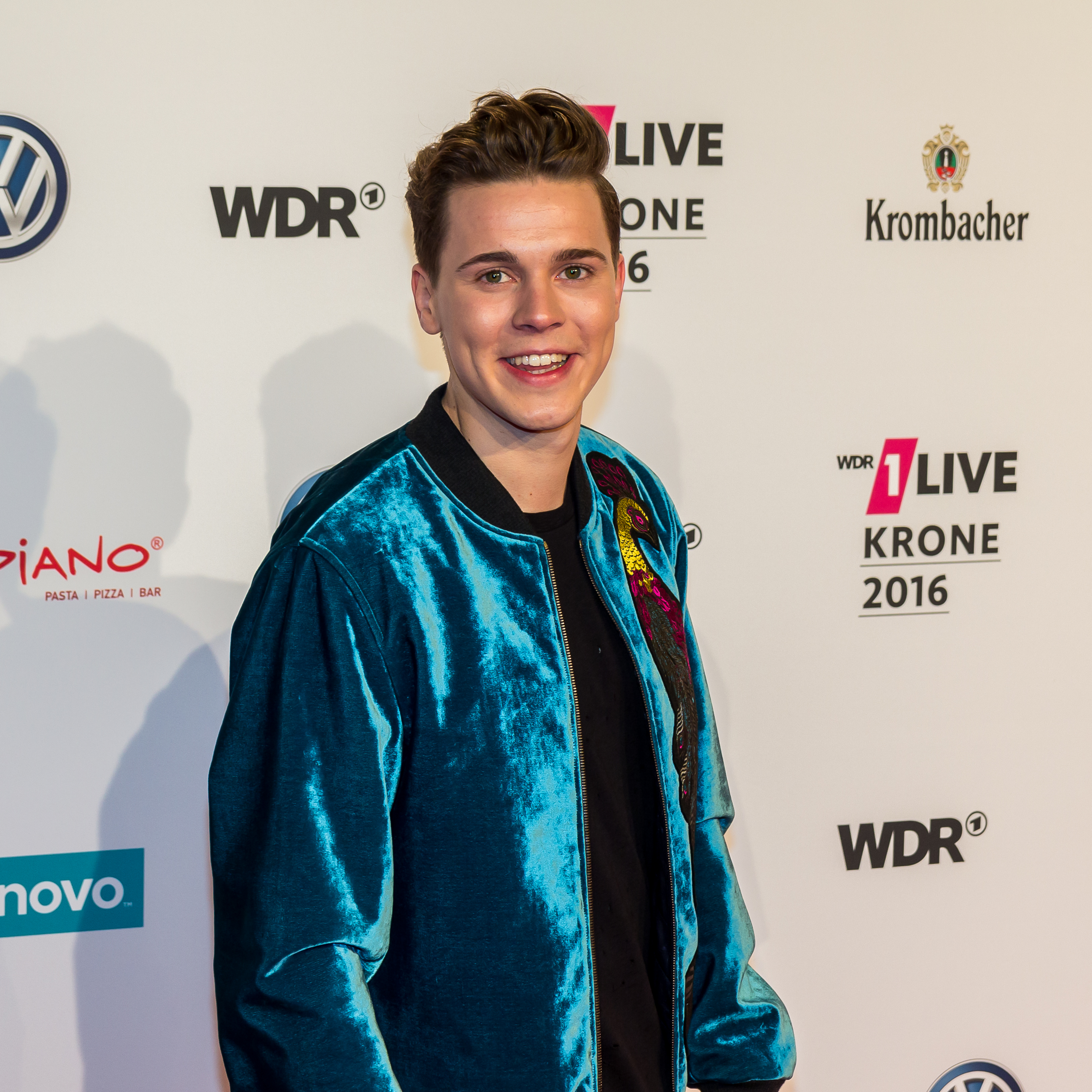
- Jaehn in 2016
- Studio albums: 3
- EPs: 1
- Singles: 37

German DJ Felix Jaehn has released three studio albums, one extended play, one remix album, one DJ mix, and thirty-seven singles.

== Albums ==
=== Studio albums ===
Title	Album details	Peak chart positions				
Title	Album details	GER	AUT	IRE	NLD	SWI
I	Released: 16 February 2018; Label: L'Agentur; Formats: CD, digital download, streaming	5	26	93	97	26
Breathe	Released: 1 October 2021; Label: Virgin; Formats: Digital download, streaming	23	—	—	—	—
NAGTTB+	Released: 9 October 2025; Label: Intercord, Universal; Formats: Digital download, streaming	—	—	—	—	—
"—" denotes an album that did not chart or was not released.

=== Remix albums ===
- I Remixed (2018)

=== DJ mixes ===
List of DJ mixes
Title	Details
Felix Jaehn: Pride 2020	Released: 22 June 2020; Format: Streaming

== Extended plays ==
List of extended plays
Title	Details
Felix Jaehn	Released: 15 January 2016; Label: L'Agentur; Formats: Digital download

== Singles ==
Title	Year	Peak positions										Certifications	Album
Title	Year	GER	AUS	AUT	BEL (FL)	BEL (WA)	FIN	FRA	NLD	SWE	SWI	Certifications	Album
"Ain't Nobody (Loves Me Better)" (featuring Jasmine Thompson)	2015	1	6	1	6	7	10	2	2	7	5	BVMI: Diamond; ARIA: 3× Platinum; IFPI AUT: Platinum; BEA: Platinum; NVPI: 5× Platinum; GLF: 4× Platinum; IFPI SWI: Platinum; RIAA: Gold	I
"Eagle Eyes" (featuring Lost Frequencies and Linying)	2015	—	—	—	68	—	—	—	—	—	—		I
"Book of Love" (featuring Polina Goudieva)	2015	7	—	15	62	57	—	100	78	—	61	BVMI: Gold	I
"Can't Go Home" (with Steve Aoki featuring Adam Lambert)	2016	—	—	—	—	—	—	—	—	—	—		Non-album single
"Jeder für jeden" (with Herbert Grönemeyer)	2016	27	—	—	—	—	—	—	—	—	—		I
"Cut the Cord" (vs. Hitimpulse)	2016	—	—	—	—	—	—	—	—	—	—		Non-album single
"Bonfire" (featuring Alma)	2016	3	—	9	—	—	14	120	100	62	39	BVMI: 3× Gold; IFPI AUT: Gold	I
"Your Soul (Holding On)" (vs. Rhodes)	2016	96	—	70	—	—	—	—	—	—	93		Non-album single
"Hot2Touch" (with Hight and Alex Aiono)	2017	12	—	14	57	—	—	178	—	—	49	BVMI: Platinum; IFPI AUT: Gold	I
"Feel Good" (with Mike Williams)	2017	72	—	66	—	—	—	—	—	—	—	BVMI: Gold	I
"Like a Riddle" (featuring Hearts & Colors and Adam Trigger)	2017	85	—	68	—	—	—	—	—	—	89		I
"Cool" (featuring Marc E. Bassy and Gucci Mane)	2018	39	—	27	—	—	—	—	—	—	—	BVMI: Gold	I
"Jennie" (featuring R. City and Bori)	2018	40	—	35	—	—	—	—	—	—	86	BVMI: Gold; IFPI AUT: Gold	I
"Keep Your Head Up" (with Damien-N-Drix)	2018	—	—	—	—	—	—	—	—	—	—	BVMI: Gold	I (Remixed)
"Masterpiece" (with Omi)	2018	—	—	—	—	—	—	—	—	—	—		Non-album single
"So Close" (with NOTD featuring Captain Cuts and Georgia Ku)	2018	45	45	43	—	—	—	—	97	77	—	ARIA: 2× Platinum; RIAA: Platinum	Breathe
"All the Lies" (with Alok featuring The Vamps)	2019	—	—	—	—	—	—	—	—	—	—		Breathe
"Liita" (with Breaking Beattz featuring Brother Leo)	2019	—	—	—	—	—	—	—	—	—	—		Non-album singles
"Love on Myself" (featuring Calum Scott)	2019	58	—	—	—	—	—	—	—	—	—		Non-album singles
"Never Alone" (with Mesto featuring Vcation)	2019	—	—	—	—	—	—	—	—	—	—		Non-album singles
"Close Your Eyes" (with Vize featuring Miss Li)	2019	21	—	24	—	—	—	—	—	63	—	BVMI: Platinum; IFPI AUT: Gold	Breathe
"Thank You [Not So Bad]" (with Vize)	2020	71	—	62	—	—	19	—	—	61	—	ARIA: Gold; BVMI: Gold	Breathe
"Sicko" (featuring Gashi and Faangs)	2020	42	—	—	—	—	—	—	—	—	—	BVMI: Gold	Non-album single
"No Therapy" (featuring Nea and Bryn Christopher)	2020	31	—	64	—	—	—	—	—	—	—	BVMI: Gold	Breathe
"I Just Wanna" (with Cheat Codes featuring Bow Anderson)	2020	—	—	—	—	—	—	—	—	—	—		Hellraisers, Pt. 3
"Where the Lights Are Low" (with Toby Romeo and Faulhaber)	2021	33	—	40	—	—	—	—	—	— (Note: "Where the Lights Are Low" did not enter the Swedish Singles Chart but peaked at number seven on the Swedish Heatseeker chart.)	—	BVMI: Gold	Non-album single
"One More Time" (with Robin Schulz featuring Alida)	2021	37	—	49	—	—	—	—	—	—	—		IIII and Breathe
"Without You" (with Mike Williams featuring Jordan Shaw)	2021	—	—	—	—	—	—	—	—	—	—		Breathe
"Heard About Me" (with Dimitri Vegas & Like Mike and Nea)	2021	—	—	—	—	—	—	—	—	—	—		Breathe
"I Got a Feeling" (with Robin Schulz featuring Georgia Ku)	2021	—	—	—	—	—	—	—	—	—	—		Breathe
"Rain in Ibiza" (with The Stickmen Project featuring Calum Scott)	2022	28	—	—	—	—	—	—	—	—	—		Non-album single
"Do It Better" (featuring Zoe Wees)	2022	69	—	—	—	—	—	—	—	—	—		NAGTTB+
"Call It Love" (with Ray Dalton)	2022	18	—	19	22	—	—	—	20	36	17		Thee Unknown
"Wishlist"	2022	—	—	—	—	—	—	—	—	—	—		NAGTTB+
"Weekends" (with Jonas Blue)	2023	51	—	—	—	—	—	—	—	—	—		Together & NAGTTB+
"All for Love" (featuring Sandro Cavazza)	2023	—	—	—	33	—	—	—	— (Note: "All for Love" did not enter the Dutch Single Top 100, but peaked at number one on the Dutch Single Tip chart.)	— (Note: "All for Love" did not enter the Swedish Singellista Chart, but peaked at number six on the Swedish Heatseeker Chart.)	—		Non-album single
"Past Life" (with Jonas Blue)	2023	—	—	—	—	—	—	—	—	—	—		Together & NAGTTB+
"Still Fall"	2023	—	—	—	—	—	—	—	—	—	—		Non-album singles
"Waking Up" (with Leony)	2024	96	—	—	—	—	—	—	—	—	—		Non-album singles
"Monster" (with Don Diablo)	2024	_	_	_	_	_	_	_	_	_	_		Non-album singles
"Without You" (with Jasmie Thompson)	2024	—	—	—	—	—	—	—	—	—	—		
"Ready for Your Love" (featuring Sophie Ellis-Bextor)	2024	—	—	—	—	—	—	—	—	—	—		NAGTTB+
"It's Not Right but It's Okay" (with Whitney Houston)	2025	—	—	—	—	—	—	—	—	—	—		NAGTTB+
"Pride" (with JHart)	2025	—	—	—	—	—	—	—	—	—	—		NAGTTB+
"Wake Up" (with Nasri)	2025	—	—	—	—	—	—	—	—	—	—		Non-album singles
"Bang Bang" (with Leony)	2025	—	—	—	—	—	—	—	—	—	—		Non-album singles
"Now's a Good Time to Be" (featuring Sarah Barrios)	2025	—	—	—	—	—	—	—	—	—	—		NAGTTB+
"Boy You Turn Me" (with Cascada)	2026	4	—	—	—	—	—	—	—	—	—		
"Siren" (with Omar Rudberg)	2026	—	—	—	—	—	—	—	—	—	—		
"—" denotes a single that did not chart or was not released in that territory.

== Remixes ==
Title	Original artist(s)	Year	Peak positions										Certifications	Album
Title	Original artist(s)	Year	GER	AUS	AUT	BEL (FL)	BEL (WA)	FIN	FRA	NLD	SWE	SWI	Certifications	Album
"Another Day in Paradise" (Felix Jaehn and Alex Schulz Remix)	Phil Collins	2013	—	—	—	—	—	—	—	—	—	—		Non-album remixes
"Berlin" (LCAW and Felix Jaehn Remix)	RY X	2013	—	—	—	—	—	—	—	—	—	—		Non-album remixes
"One Last Time" (Felix Jaehn featuring Chris Meid Remix)	Jaymes Young	2014	—	—	—	—	—	—	—	—	—	—		Non-album remixes
"Cheerleader" (Felix Jaehn Remix)	Omi	2014	1	1	1	1	1	1	1	1	1	1	ARIA: 4× Platinum; BPI: 6× Platinum; BVMI: 4× Platinum; BEA: Platinum; GLF: 7× Platinum; IFPI DEN: 2× Platinum; RIAA: 3× Platinum	Me 4 U and I
"The Nights" (Felix Jaehn Remix)	Avicii	2015	—	—	—	—	—	—	—	—	—	—		The Days / Nights EP
"Photograph" (Felix Jaehn Remix)	Ed Sheeran	2015	4	—	—	—	—	—	—	—	—	—		I
"Some Say" (Felix Jaehn Remix)	Nea	2020	—	13	—	—	—	—	—	—	—	—		Non-album remix
"Sicko"	Felix Jaehn (featuring Gashi and Faangs)	2020	—	—	—	—	—	—	—	—	—	—		Non-album remix
"By Your Side"	Calvin Harris (featuring Tom Grennan)	2021	—	—	—	—	—	—	—	—	—	—		By Your Side (feat. Tom Grennan) [Remixes]
"Lavender Haze"	Taylor Swift	2023	—	—	—	—	—	—	—	—	—	—		Lavender Haze (Felix Jaehn Remix)
"Yes, And?"	Ariana Grande	2024	—	—	—	—	—	—	—	—	—	—		Yes, And? (Remixes)
"—" denotes a song that did not chart or was not released in that territory.

== As Eff ==
Title	Year	Peak positions			Certifications	Album
Title	Year	GER	AUT	SWI	Certifications	Album
"Stimme"	2015	1	10	26	BVMI: Platinum	I
