= Heavy Rules Mixtape =

EP / Mixtape by Alma
- Released: 2 March 2018
- Recorded: 2017–2018
- Length: 20:36
- Label: PME Records; Warner Music Finland; Virgin
- Producer: Axident; Hank Solo; Mag; Jason Gill

Alma chronology
Dye My Hair (2016)	Heavy Rules Mixtape (2018)	Have U Seen Her? (Part 1) (2019)

Heavy Rules Mixtape is an extended play/mixtape by Finnish singer and songwriter Alma. It was released through PME Records and Warner Music Finland on 2 March 2018. Songs for the extended play were written and recorded in 2017 and early 2018. The extended play was produced by Axident, Hank Solo, Mag, Jason Gill and features guest appearances by MØ, Tove Styrke and Kiiara.

== Background ==
Alma released her debut extended play Dye My Hair in 2016. In 2017, she was featured on Sub Focus' single "Don't You Feel It" and Martin Solveig's single "All Stars" and released solo singles "Chasing Highs" and "Phases" with French Montana. In February 2018, it was announced that Alma would release Heavy Rules Mixtape the following month. Alma said that she decided to release more music, because "I'm going on tour and I have these festival shows and everything, and it feels super horrible to play these gigs and to have so few songs out". In an interview with Paper, Alma spoke of the recording process, saying:

I think now I've found what I want to do — I've found my friends and the people I like to work with. While I was once struggling with my sound, I'm in a better place than when I started. You can hear the vibe on this mixtape, too.

== Critical reception ==
Heavy Rules Mixtape received positive reception from Idolator, according to which "it goes hard from the opening track and maintains that quality and energy until the final beat" Paper wrote of the release that it is "full-on pop, packed with slick club synths and smart lyrics that build into enormous choruses". Nylon wrote that the EP is "one of the finest releases to come out of the pop scene" in 2018. Finnish newspaper Helsingin Sanomat gave the release four stars.

== Track listing ==
Heavy Rules Mixtape digital download track listing
No.	Title	Writer(s)	Producer(s)	Length
1.	"Legend"	Alma Miettinen; Hank Solo; Andrei Kipahti	Hank Solo	3:09
2.	"Dance for Me" (featuring MØ)	Miettinen; Charlotte Aitchison; Jonnali Parmenius; Andreas Schuller; Karen Marie Örsted	Axident	3:35
3.	"Good Vibes" (featuring Tove Styrke)	Miettinen; Sara Hjellström; Johan Fransson	Jason Gill	3:26
4.	"Fake Gucci"	Miettinen; Hank Solo	Hank Solo	3:07
5.	"Back2u"	Miettinen; Hank Solo	Hank Solo	3:58
6.	"Chit Chat" (featuring Kiiara)	Miettinen; Priscilla Hamilton	Louis Schoorl; Mag	3:20
Total length:				20:36

Heavy Rules Mixtape acoustic track listing
No.	Title	Writer(s)	Producer(s)	Length
1.	"Dance for Me" (acoustic) (featuring MØ)	Miettinen; Aitchison; Jonnali Parmenius; Schuller; Örsted	Axident; Larus Oern Arnarson	3:19
2.	"Good Vibes" (acoustic) (featuring Tove Styrke)	Miettinen; Hjellström; Aransson	Fredrik Okazaki; Bergstrom; Jason Gill	3:51
Total length:				7:10

Heavy Rules Mixtape remixes track listing
No.	Title	Writer(s)	Producer(s)	Length
1.	"Dance for Me" (Initial Talk Remix) (featuring MØ)	Miettinen; Aitchison; Parmenius; Schuller; Örsted	Axident; Arnarson	2:57
2.	"Good Vibes" (Just Kiddin Remix) (featuring Tove Styrke)	Miettinen; Hjellström; Fransson	Okazaki; Bergstrom; Gill	4:04
Total length:				7:02

== Charts ==
Weekly chart performance for Heavy Rules Mixtape
Chart (2018)	Peak position
Finnish Albums (Suomen virallinen lista)	9
Swedish Albums (Sverigetopplistan)	41
