= Somewhere in Between =

Somewhere in Between may refer to:

- Somewhere in Between (Systematic album), 2001
- Somewhere in Between (Leony album), 2023
- "Somewhere in Between", a song by Hawthorne Heights from the album Fragile Future
- "Somewhere in Between", a song by Kate Bush from the album Aerial
- Somewhere in Between, an album by Vérité
