= Friendships (Lost My Love) =

Song by Pascal Letoublon

Instrumental by Pascal Letoublon
- Released: September 5, 2017
- Length: 4:02
- Label: Suprafive

"Friendships (Lost My Love)"

Single by Pascal Letoublon featuring Leony

from the album Somewhere in Between
- Released: September 5, 2017
- Length: 3:02
- Label: Suprafive

"Friendships" is an instrumental electronic dance music song by Pascal Letoublon, released in 2017. Lyrics sung by Leony were added in 2020 and released as "Friendships (Lost My Love)".

The song is notable for being one of the most widely used backing tracks used on viral videos. In October 2022, "Friendships (Lost My Love)" was nominated for an NRJ Music Award in the "Social Hit" category. As of 2021, the instrumental version of the song had received 75 million views on Youtube, and 40 million plays on other streaming services.

During 2022 Gabry Ponte remixed and released another variant of "Friendships (Lost My Love) ft. Leony".

== Charts ==
2024 Weekly chart performance for "Friendships (Lost My Love)"
Chart (2024)	Peak position
Moldova Airplay (TopHit)	77

== Certifications ==
Certifications for "Friendships"
Region	Certification	Certified units/sales
Poland (ZPAV)	3× Platinum	150,000^{‡}
^{‡} Sales+streaming figures based on certification alone.

Certifications for "Friendships (Lost My Love)"
Region	Certification	Certified units/sales
Brazil (Pro-Música Brasil)	Gold	20,000^{‡}
France (SNEP)	Diamond	333,333^{‡}
Germany (BVMI)	3× Gold	600,000^{‡}
Italy (FIMI)	Gold	50,000^{‡}
Poland (ZPAV)	Platinum	50,000^{‡}
^{‡} Sales+streaming figures based on certification alone.
