= Toby Romeo =

Austrian DJ and producer (born 2000)

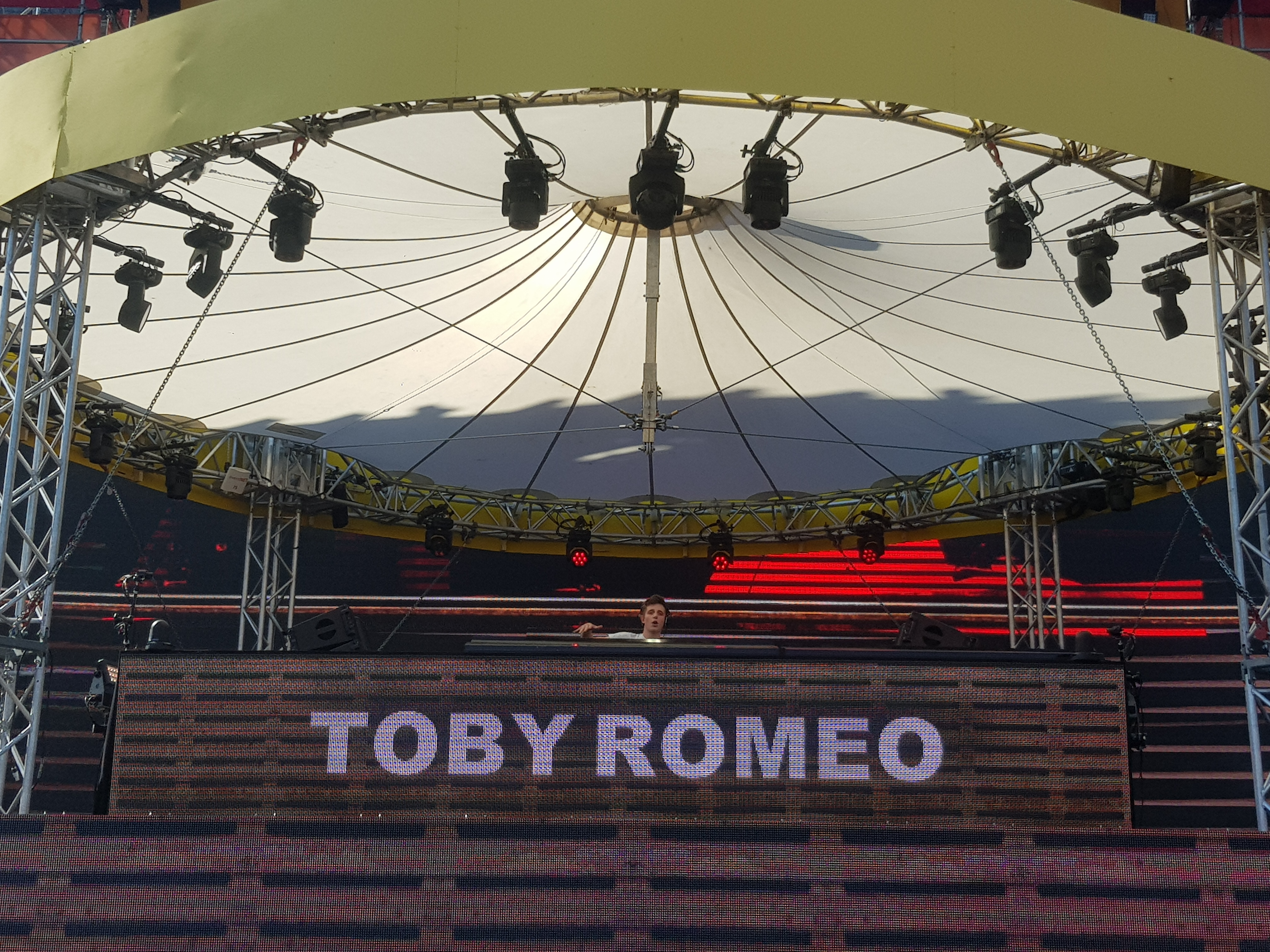
- Romeo performing at Electric Love festival 2019
- Born: Tobias Waß; November 8, 2000 (age 25)
- Occupations: DJ, producer
- Years active: 2013–present
- Musical career
- Genre: EDM
- Label: Universal
- Website: www.universal-music.de/tobyromeo

Toby Romeo (born Tobias Waß; 8 November 2000) is an Austrian DJ and music producer from Salzburg best known for the song "Where the Lights Are Low" featuring Felix Jaehn. He also had appearances at international music festivals such as Parookaville and Electric Love. He is signed by Universal.

== Musical career ==
Waß grew up in a musical family and learnt multiple instruments as a child. At the age of 13 he played at Donauinselfest festival after winning the DJ-contest. Appearances at Electric Love and Lakefestival followed. In 2018 he met Felix Jaehn at a show in Italy he opened up for him. Jaehn became his mentor and they worked together on several projects. Toby Romeo produced a remix for his collaboration with Alok "All the Lies" which was published on Spinnin' Records. In 2020 another remixes for "Sicko" as well as Alan Walkers "Alone Pt. II" were published and played by Hardwell. Toby Romeo also served as co-producer for Felix Jaehn's Remix of "Some Say" by Nea.

In 2021, Toby Romeo and Felix Jaehn published their first collaboration called "Where the Lights Are Low". The song was ranked in the German and Austrian charts.

== Discography ==
=== Singles ===
- 2015: "Energy"
- 2017: "Whatever It Takes"
- 2018: "How Do You Feel"
- 2021: "Where the Lights Are Low" (with Felix Jaehn and Faulhaber)
- 2021: "Oh Lord"
- 2021: "Reminds Me of You"
- 2022: "Hopeless Heart" (with Keanu Silva and Sacha)
- 2022: "Devils Cup" (with Sahara Beck)
- 2022: "White Horses" (with Karen Harding and Noel Holler)
- 2022: "Crazy Love" (with Leony)
- 2023: "Alive" (with Declan J Donovan)
- 2023: "What It Feels Like" (with YouNotUs)
- 2023: "Lay Low" (with Izzy Bizu and 220 KID)
- 2024: "Shine" (featuring Sam Fischer)
- 2024: "Fire" (with Benny Cristo)
- 2024: "Highs & Lows" (with Klangkarussell and Ely Oaks)

=== Remixes ===
- 2015: Jeff?! – "Light Up the Night" (Toby Romeo Remix)
- 2019: Leland – "Another Lover" (Toby Romeo Remix)
- 2019: Felix Jaehn, Alok and The Vamps – "All the Lies" (Toby Romeo Remix)
- 2020: Felix Jaehn featuring Gashi and Faangs – "Sicko" (Toby Romeo Remix)
- 2020: Miss Li – "Complicated" (Toby Romeo Remix)
- 2020: Alan Walker and Ava Max – "Alone, Pt. II" (Toby Romeo Remix)
- 2020: Felix Jaehn featuring Nea and Bryn Christopher – "No Therapy" (Toby Romeo Remix)
- 2020: K-391 – "Aurora" (Toby Romeo Remix)
- 2021: Nicky Romero, MARF and Wulf - "Okay" (Toby Romeo Remix)
- 2021: Joel Corry, RAYE and David Guetta - "BED" (Toby Romeo Remix)
- 2021: Hook N Sling, Galantis and Karen Harding - "The Best" (Toby Romeo Remix)
