= Some Say (Nea song) =

Single by Nea
- Released: 6 September 2019
- Length: 2:55
- Label: Kookie Diamond; Linnea Södahl; Milkshake; Sony Music Entertainment Sweden
- Songwriters: Bryn Christopher; Anna Södahl; Gianfranco Randone; Maurizio Lobina; Massimo Gabutti
- Producers: Hitimpulse; Vincent Kottkamp

Nea singles chronology
"Some Say" (2019)	"Dedicated" (2020)

Music video
- "Some Say" on YouTube

"Some Say" is a song by Swedish singer Nea and was released as her debut single on 6 September 2019. Following the song's success in Europe in late 2019 and early 2020, the song was remixed by German DJ Felix Jaehn. The remix was released on 10 January 2020.

The song has since reached number one in Belgium (Wallonia), Slovakia and Poland, the top ten in Austria, Denmark, Hungary, the Netherlands, Norway, Romania and Switzerland, as well as the top 20 in Australia, Belgium (Flanders), France, Germany and Sweden. The song interpolates Eiffel 65's 1998 song, "Blue (Da Ba Dee)".

Lyrically, it sees Nea singing about an unrequited love and is inspired by events experienced by a friend of hers. Nea describes that "the song is about love that you can't attain but that you can't give up on". On Genius, she explained that the opening lyrics of the song describe the moment "when you love someone so completely and the other person doesn’t feel the same thing, you just wanna put the blame on something else… The time, the timing, anything but unreturned love."

== Credits and personnel ==
Credits adapted from Tidal.

- Linnéa Södahl – vocals, songwriting, composer
- Bryn Christopher – songwriting, composer
- Vincent Kottkamp – production, composer, guitar, mixing engineering
- Hitimpulse – production, mixing engineering
- Alexsej Vlasenko – composer, synthesizer
- Jonas Kalisch – composer, bass
- Henrik Meinke – composer, drums
- Jeremy Chacon – composer, keyboards
- Lex Barkey – master engineering
- Jeffrey Jey (Eiffel 65) – songwriter
- Maurizio Lobina (Eiffel 65) – songwriter/producer
- Gabry Ponte (Eiffel 65) – producer

== Charts ==
=== Weekly charts ===
Weekly chart performance for "Some Say"
Chart (2019–2020)	Peak position
Australia (ARIA)	13
Austria (Ö3 Austria Top 40)	9
Belgium (Ultratop 50 Flanders)	4
Belgium (Ultratop 50 Wallonia)	1
CIS Airplay (TopHit) Felix Jaehn Remix	2
Czech Republic Airplay (ČNS IFPI)	3
Czech Republic Singles Digital (ČNS IFPI)	19
Denmark (Tracklisten)	4
Finland Airplay (Radiosoittolista)	4
France (SNEP)	14
Germany (GfK)	15
Global Excl. US (Billboard)	74
Hungary (Dance Top 40)	27
Hungary (Rádiós Top 40)	1
Hungary (Single Top 40)	1
Hungary (Stream Top 40)	4
Iceland (Tónlistinn)	9
Ireland (IRMA)	39
Netherlands (Dutch Top 40)	5
Netherlands (Single Top 100)	12
New Zealand Hot Singles (RMNZ)	33
Norway (VG-lista)	6
Poland Airplay (ZPAV)	1
Portugal (AFP)	101
Romania Airplay (Media Forest)	2
Russia Airplay (TopHit) Felix Jaehn Remix	5
Slovakia Airplay (ČNS IFPI)	1
Slovakia Singles Digital (ČNS IFPI)	18
Slovenia Airplay (SloTop50)	9
Spain (Promusicae)	65
Sweden (Sverigetopplistan)	12
Switzerland (Schweizer Hitparade)	5
Ukraine Airplay (TopHit) Felix Jaehn Remix	1
UK Singles (Official Charts)	89

2023 weekly chart performance
Chart (2023)	Peak position
Belarus Airplay (TopHit) Felix Jaehn Remix	85
Kazakhstan Airplay (TopHit) Felix Jaehn Remix	154
Lithuania Airplay (TopHit) Felix Jaehn Remix	91
Moldova Airplay (TopHit) Felix Jaehn Remix	47
Ukraine Airplay (TopHit) Felix Jaehn Remix	156

2025 weekly chart performance
Chart (2025)	Peak position
Belarus Airplay (TopHit) Felix Jaehn Remix	131
Finland Airplay (Radiosoittolista)	63
Moldova Airplay (TopHit) Felix Jaehn Remix	110

2026 weekly chart performance
Chart (2026)	Peak position
Finland Airplay (Radiosoittolista)	75
Kazakhstan Airplay (TopHit) Felix Jaehn Remix	93

=== Year-end charts ===
2019 year-end chart performance for "Some Say"
Chart (2019)	Position
Poland (Polish Airplay Top 100)	48

2020 year-end chart performance for "Some Say"
Chart (2020)	Position
Australia (ARIA)	56
Austria (Ö3 Austria Top 40)	10
Belgium (Ultratop Flanders)	8
Belgium (Ultratop Wallonia)	3
Denmark (Tracklisten)	12
France (SNEP)	19
Germany (Official German Charts)	11
Hungary (Dance Top 40)	89
Hungary (Rádiós Top 40)	10
Hungary (Single Top 40)	13
Hungary (Stream Top 40)	11
Netherlands (Dutch Top 40)	26
Netherlands (Single Top 100)	47
Poland (Polish Airplay Top 100)	42
Romania (Airplay 100)	17
Sweden (Sverigetopplistan)	30
Switzerland (Schweizer Hitparade)	12

2021 year-end chart performance for "Some Say"
Chart (2021)	Position
Hungary (Rádiós Top 40)	38
Hungary (Stream Top 40)	66

== Certifications ==
Certifications for "Some Say"
Region	Certification	Certified units/sales
Australia (ARIA)	2× Platinum	140,000^{‡}
Austria (IFPI Austria)	3× Platinum	90,000^{‡}
Belgium (BRMA)	Platinum	40,000^{‡}
Canada (Music Canada)	Platinum	80,000^{‡}
Denmark (IFPI Danmark)	2× Platinum	180,000^{‡}
France (SNEP)	Diamond	333,333^{‡}
Germany (BVMI)	3× Gold	600,000^{‡}
Italy (FIMI)	Gold	35,000^{‡}
Mexico (AMPROFON)	Gold	30,000^{‡}
New Zealand (RMNZ)	Gold	15,000^{‡}
Poland (ZPAV)	3× Platinum	60,000^{‡}
Portugal (AFP)	Gold	5,000^{‡}
Spain (Promusicae)	Platinum	60,000^{‡}
Switzerland (IFPI Switzerland)	Platinum	20,000^{‡}
United Kingdom (BPI)	Silver	200,000^{‡}
^{‡} Sales+streaming figures based on certification alone.

== See also ==
- "I'm Good (Blue)" – by David Guetta and Bebe Rexha
