= Oldschool Love =

Studio album by Leony
- Released: 28 February 2025
- Length: 39:05
- Labels: Central Station, Kontor

Leony chronology
Somewhere in Between (2023)	Oldschool Love (2025)

Singles from Oldschool Love
- 1. "I Can Feel" Released: 29 September 2023; 2. "Simple Life" Released: March 2024; 3. "Fire" Released: 10 May 2024; 4. "Rock n Roll" Released: 25 October 2024; 5. "By Your Side (In My Mind)" Released: 10 January 2025

Oldschool Love is the second studio album by German singer Leony. It was released by Kontor Records on 28 February 2025 and peaked at number 12 on the German GfK Entertainment charts.

== Reception ==
Kerstin Kratochwill from laut.de said "The title Oldschool Love already hints at the mood of the songs, a return to a supposedly idyllic past with disco-fox beats and a constant stream of background music." Complementing "I Can Feel", "Be Your Side (In My Mind)", "Rock 'n' Roll" and "The Weekend". Kratochwill called it "an album that is as opportunistic as it is optimistic, simulating both authenticity and coolness, and therefore swimming silently in the vast mainstream sea."

== Track listing ==
1. "I'll Be Alright" (intro) – 1:15
2. "Oldschool Love" - 2:42
3. "By Your Side (In My Mind)" - 2:57
4. "Your Way" - 2:20
5. "Simple Life" - 2:33
6. "Fire - Official UEFA EURO 2024 Song" (featuring Meduza and OneRepublic) - 2:48
7. "Another Goodbye" - 2:52
8. "Count On Me" - 3:00
9. "Afterglow" - 2:25
10. "What If" - 2:11
11. "The Weekend" (featuring Imran) - 2:34
12. "One in a Million" - 3:05
13. "Rock 'n' Roll" (featuring G-Eazy) - 2:38
14. "I Can Feel" (featuring Niklas Dee and Vize) - 2:53
15. "Running Through the Night" - 2:46

== Charts ==
Weekly chart performance for Oldschool Love
Chart (2025)	Peak position
Austrian Albums (Ö3 Austria)	28
German Albums (Offizielle Top 100)	20
