= Moominvalley (soundtrack) =

Soundtrack album by various artists
- Released: April 19, 2019
- Length: 54:12
- Label: Columbia
- Producer: Goss; Tobias Laust; Matti Mikkola; Ben Baptiste; Tom Odell; Colonel Suns; Barney Lister; Tucker Martine; Emilíana Torrini; Aarich Jespers; Kobe Proesmans; Rich Cooper; Josef Salvat; Samuli Sirviö; Johannes Brotherus; Ant Whiting; Liam Ramsden; Declan McKenna; Dodie; Christel Sundberg; Jori Sjöroos

Various artists chronology
Moominvalley (2019)	Moominvalley 2 (Official Soundtrack) (2020)

Singles from Moominvalley
- 1. "Theme Song (I'm Far Away)" Released: February 22, 2019; 2. "Starlight" Released: February 22, 2019; 3. "Summer Day" Released: April 5, 2019

Moominvalley is the soundtrack to the animated family drama series Moominvalley. In September 2018, it was announced that Gutsy Animations made a deal with Sony Music to have the label's artists contribute original songs for each episode. The track listing for the soundtrack was revealed on 25 January 2019. Danish singer Mø sings the theme song "I'm Far Away" for the series. The series includes tracks from artists such as Tom Odell, First Aid Kit, and Alma. The theme song and "Starlight" by Alma were released from the soundtrack on February 22, 2019. "Summer Day" by Tom Odell was released on April 5, 2019. The soundtrack was released on April 19, 2019, through Columbia Records.

== Track listing ==
No.	Title	Writer(s)	Producer(s)	Length
1.	"Theme Song (I'm Far Away)" (performed by MØ)	Kristoffer Fogelmark; Albin Nedler; Karen Marie Ørsted; Mads Damsgaard Kristiansen	Goss; Tobias Laust	2:29
2.	"Starlight" (performed by Alma)	Matti Mikkola; Alma Miettinen	Mikkola	2:20
3.	"Summer Day" (performed by Tom Odell)	Tom Odell	Ben Baptie; Odell	2:58
4.	"Back to the Cave" (performed by Colonel Suns)	Dave Palmer; Ed Harcourt	Colonel Suns	3:37
5.	"Love Me with All of Your Heart" (performed by Delilah Montagu)	Carlos Rigual; Mario Rigual; Carlos Albert Martinoli	Barney Lister	2:39
6.	"Home Again" (performed by First Aid Kit)	Klara Söderberg; Johanna Söderberg	Tucker Martine	4:06
7.	"There Is Something in the Forest" (performed by Emilíana Torrini, The Colorist Orchestra and Kársnes Girl Choir)	Emilíana Torrini; Aarich Jespers; Joris Caluwaerts; Kobe Proesmans	Torrini; Jespers; Proesmans	3:43
8.	"Home" (performed by Josef Salvat)	Rich Cooper; Josef Salvat	Cooper; Salvat	3:20
9.	"All Small Beasts Should Have Bows in Their Tails" (performed by Ellinoora)	Mia Makaroff; Steven Box	Samuli Sirviö; Johannes Brotherus	2:08
10.	"Free Spirit" (performed by Josef Salvat)	Rich Cooper; Josef Salvat	Cooper; Salvat	3:04
11.	"Country Air" (performed by SOAK)	Paul Livingston; John Douglas; Frank Reader	Ant Whiting	3:27
12.	"By Your Side" (performed by Mellah)	Liam Ramsden	Ramsden	3:09
13.	"In Blue" (performed by Declan McKenna)	Declan McKenna	McKenna	4:54
14.	"Northern Lights" (performed by MØ and Goss)	Karen Marie Ørsted; Kristiansen	Goss; Laust	3:37
15.	"Ready Now" (performed by Dodie Clark)	Dorothy Clark	Dodie	3:01
16.	"The Author" (performed by Roosberg)	Christel Sundberg; Jori Sjöroos	Sundberg; Sjöroos	3:35

== Charts ==
Chart (2019)	Peak position
Finnish Albums (Suomen virallinen lista)	40
