= Somewhere in Between (Leony album) =

Studio album by Leony
- Released: 24 March 2023
- Recorded: 2020–2022
- Length: 60:01
- Labels: Central Station, Kontor
- Producers: Mark Becker; Vize

Leony chronology
| Somewhere in Between (2023) | Oldschool Love (2025) |

Singles from Somewhere in Between
- 1. "Far Away From Home" Released: 12 June 2020; 2. "Friendships (Lost My Love)" Released: 13 November 2020; 3. "Faded Love" Released: 15 January 2021; 4. "Raindrops" Released: 10 December 2021; 5. "Remedy" Released: 14 January 2022; 6. "Crazy Love" Released: 24 June 2022; 7. "Love on the Line" Released: 18 November 2022; 8. "Somewhere in Between" Released: 6 January 2023; 9. "Holding On" Released: 24 March 2023

Somewhere in Between is the debut studio album by German singer Leony. It was released by Kontor Records on 24 March 2023.

== Critical reception ==
Professional ratings
Review scores
| Source | Rating |
|---|---|
| laut.de | 2/5 stars |

laut.de editor Kerstin Kratochwill rated the album two out of five stars. She noted that "as with most albums produced for radio and the mainstream, an army of writers are hired for the (guaranteed) hits [...] Also present is Katja Krasavice, with whom [Leony] sings on "Raindrops." This and the opener "Say My Name" are among the successful tracks on the album – they are unobtrusive, floating, casual pop, with nice, almost minimalist electronica effects. But then there are also the pseudo-modern moments that make your ears bleed when you shudder to remember Modern Talking's capitalism pop."

== Chart performance ==
Somewhere in Between debuted and peaked at number 20 on the German Albums Chart in the week of 31 March 2023 and fell out of the chart in its third week of release. In Austria, the album opened at number 28 on the Austrian Albums Chart.

== Track listing ==
Somewhere in Between track listing – CD 1
| No. | Title | Writer(s) | Producer(s) | Length |
|---|---|---|---|---|
| 1. | "Say My Name" | Leonie Burger; Philipp Klemz; Mark Becker; Vitali Zestovskih | Becker; Zestovskih | 3:13 |
| 2. | "Somewhere in Between" | Burger; Becker; Zestovskih | Becker; Zestovskih | 2:36 |
| 3. | "Faded Love" | Burger; Dan Balan; Becker; Zestovskih | Becker; Zestovskih | 2:28 |
| 4. | "Raindrops" (featuring Katja Krasavice) | Burger; Krasavice; Barbara Tanzini; Hanni Mari Autere; Luca Manuel Montesinos Gargallo; Luca Ontino; Maria Anita Lehtola; Sari Hilja Kauranen; Simone Bocchino; Timo Olavi Vaeaenaenen; Valentina Dante; Becker; Zestovskih | Becker; Zestovskih | 2:20 |
| 5. | "Remedy" | Burger; Becker; Zestovskih | Becker; Zestovskih | 2:27 |
| 6. | "Holding On" | Burger; Becker; Zestovskih | Becker; Zestovskih | 2:52 |
| 7. | "Love on the Line" (featuring Vize) | Burger; Becker; Zestovskih | Becker; Zestovskih | 2:49 |
| 8. | "Friendships (Lost My Love)" (featuring Pascal Letoublon) | Letoublon; Kiddo; Linnea Soadhl; Andrei Mihai; Elena Morosanu | | 3:02 |
| 9. | "Far Away From Home" (featuring Sam Feldt and Vize) | Burger; Dom Lyttle; Sammy Renders; Zestovskih | Feldt; Vize | 2:43 |
| 10. | "Lifeline" | Burger; Becker; Zestovskih; Adrien Nookadu; Andre Nookadu; Matthew Humphrey | Becker; Zestovskih | 2:31 |
| 11. | "Crazy Love" (featuring Toby Romeo) | Burger; Amanda Kongshaug; Claudio Maselli; Romeo | Romeo | 2:27 |
| 12. | "Shooting Stars" | Burger; Klemz; Becker; Zestovskih | Becker; Zestovskih | 2:50 |

Somewhere in Between track listing – CD 2
| No. | Title | Writer(s) | Producer(s) | Length |
|---|---|---|---|---|
| 1. | "Never Let Me Down" | Burger; Maselli; Becker; Klemz; Thomas Daniel Gregory; Zestovskih | Becker; Zestovskih | 2:02 |
| 2. | "Remedy" (acoustic version) | Burger; Becker; Zestovskih | Becker; Zestovskih | 2:07 |
| 3. | "One Last Time" | Burger; Becker; Zestovskih; Etta Zelmani; Fadil El Ghoul | Becker; Zestovskih | 2:40 |
| 4. | "White Lies" | Burger; Becker; Zestovskih; Bill Kaulitz; Tom Kaulitz; Maselli | Becker; Zestovskih | 2:34 |
| 5. | "Faded Love" (acoustic version) | Burger; Balan; Becker; Zestovskih | Becker; Zestovskih | 2:26 |
| 6. | "Paradise" | Burger; Philipp Dittberner; Klemz; Zestovskih | Klemz; Zestovskih | 1:53 |
| 7. | "Thank You (Not So Bad)" | Dido Armstrong; Paul Herman | | 1:58 |
| 8. | "Bad Love" | Burger; Becker; Zestovskih; B. Kaulitz; T. Kaulitz; Emma Rosen | Becker; Zestovskih | 2:32 |
| 9. | "Cross My Mind" | Burger; Becker; Zestovskih; Jacob Dilßner; Marie von Bothmer | Becker; Zestovskih | 2:04 |
| 10. | "Above and Beyond" | Burger; Becker; Mark Cwiertnia; Zestovskih | Becker; Zestovskih | 2:31 |
| 11. | "Working Title" | ALOTT; Leonie Burger | | 2:54 |
| 12. | "No Hard Feelings" | Burger; Hight; Reuben Phillip Tudor Grey; Vitali Zestovskih; Yk Koi | Becker; Zestovskih | 2:14 |
| Total length: | | | | 60:01 |

Sample credits

- "Faded Love" samples from the song "Dragostea Din Tei" (2003) as written by Dan Bălan and performed by O-Zone.

== Charts ==
Weekly chart performance for Somewhere in Between
| Chart (2023) | Peak position |
|---|---|
| Austrian Albums (Ö3 Austria) | 28 |
| German Albums (Offizielle Top 100) | 20 |

== Certifications ==
Certifications for "Somewhere in Between"
| Region | Certification | Certified units/sales |
|---|---|---|
| Netherlands (NVPI) | Gold | 18,600^{‡} |
^{‡} Sales+streaming figures based on certification alone.

== Release history ==
Somewhere in Between release history
| Region | Date | Format(s) | Label(s) | Ref. |
|---|---|---|---|---|
| Various | 24 March 2023 | Digital download; CD; streaming | Kontor | |
