= Dye My Hair =

Single by Alma

from the EP Dye My Hair
- Released: 28 October 2016
- Recorded: 2016
- Genre: Pop
- Length: 3:27 (single); 13:21 (EP)
- Label: PME; Virgin
- Songwriters: Joe Walter; Pascal Reinhardt; Alma Miettinen
- Producer: Pascal Reinhardt

Alma singles chronology
"Bonfire" (2016)	"Dye My Hair" (2016)	"Chasing Highs" (2017)

Alma album chronology
Dye My Hair (2016)	Heavy Rules Mixtape (2018)

Singles from Dye My Hair
- 1. "Karma" Released: 3 June 2016; 2. "Dye My Hair" Released: 28 October 2016

"Dye My Hair" is a single and the debut extended play by Finnish singer-songwriter Alma. The song was released in Finland as a digital download on 28 October 2016 alongside a four-track EP. The song peaked at number 8 on the Finnish Singles Chart.

== Music video ==
A music video to accompany the release of "Dye My Hair" was first released onto YouTube on 16 December 2016 at a total length of three minutes and twenty-eight seconds. As of October 2018, the song has received over 10 million views.

== Track listing ==
Dye My Hair – EP
No.	Title	Writer(s)	Producer(s)	Length
1.	"Dye My Hair"	Alma Miettinen; Johannes Walter Mueller; Pascal Reinhardt	Pascal Reinhardt	3:27
2.	"Karma"	Miettinen; Alexsej Vlasenko; Henrik Meinke; Jeremy Chacon; Jonas Kalisch	Hitimpulse	3:18
3.	"Knock"	Miettinen; Reinhardt	Reinhardt	3:20
4.	"Dye My Hair" (acoustic version)	Miettinen; Mueller; Reinhardt	Matti-Pekka Lehtinen	3:16
Total length:				13:21

Digital download – Endor Remix
No.	Title	Length
1.	"Dye My Hair" (Endor Remix)	3:38

Digital download – Lenno Remix
No.	Title	Length
1.	"Dye My Hair" (Lenno Remix)	3:46

Digital download – Branchez Remix
No.	Title	Length
1.	"Dye My Hair" (Branchez Remix)	3:10

Digital download – Felon Remix
No.	Title	Length
1.	"Dye My Hair" (Felon Remix)	4:26

== Personnel ==
Credits adapted from Tidal.

- Alma – vocals (all tracks)
- Pascal Reinhardt – bass vocals (tracks 1, 3), mixing engineer (track 1, 3)
- Lex Barkey – mastering engineer (tracks 1–3)
- Jonas Monar – piano (track 1)
- Jonas Kalisch – bass vocals (track 2)
- Jeremy Chachon – drums (track 2)
- Hitimpulse – mixing engineer (track 2)
- Alexsej Vlasenko – piano (track 2)
- Henrik Meinke – synthesizer (track 2)
- Matti-Pekka Lehtinen – guitar (track 4)
- Oskar Skaag – mixing engineer (track 4)
- Minerva Pappi – mastering engineer (track 4)
- Waudio Mastering – mastering engineer (track 4)

== Charts ==
Weekly chart performance for "Dye My Hair"
Chart (2016–17)	Peak position
Austria (Ö3 Austria Top 40)	26
Denmark (Hitlisten)	38
Finland Radio (Suomen virallinen radiolistasijoitus)	6
Finland Sales (Suomen virallinen singlelista)	2
Finland Streaming (Suomen virallinen striimilistasijoitus)	5
Germany (Official German Charts)	25
Scottish Singles Sales (Official Charts)	59

== Certifications ==
Certifications for "Dye My Hair"
Region	Certification	Certified units/sales
Denmark (IFPI Danmark)	Gold	45,000^{‡}
Germany (BVMI)	Gold	200,000^{‡}
^{‡} Sales+streaming figures based on certification alone.

== Release history ==
Release dates for "Dye My Hair"
Region	Date	Format	Label
Finland	28 October 2016	Digital download	PME Records
