= Hitimpulse =

German music production group

- Origin: Berlin, Germany
- Occupations: Record producers; songwriters
- Years active: 2015–present
- Members: Jonas Kalisch; Henrik Meinke; Alexsej Vlasenko; Jeremy Chacon
- Website: hitimpulse-music.com

Hitimpulse is an international production team based in Berlin, Germany. They are best known for producing and writing songs for artists such as Ellie Goulding, AJ Mitchell, Ava Max, Kygo, Becky Hill, Zara Larsson, Trevor Daniel, Alma, Tove Lo.

== Career ==
The team consists of Jonas Kalisch, Henrik Meinke, Alexsej Vlasenko and Jeremy Chacon. Their shared passion for music and each other's beats led to them meeting up in Berlin to do some sessions together – and Hitimpulse was born.

In 2016, Hitimpulse released the song "I'm in Love with the Coco" via B1 Recordings and Ultra Music. The song, inspired by the 2014 original single by hip hop recording artist O.T. Genasis, is a remix of the cover version by English singer Ed Sheeran. The song received over 120 million plays on major streaming platforms. The official music video, filming the lives of the farmers on a cocoa estate in Trinidad, was released. Hitimpulse also released the song "Cut the Cord" with musician Felix Jaehn.

In 2017, they released their 2nd single "Cover Girls" featuring Bibi Bourelly.

== Discography ==
=== Songwriting & Production ===
Year	Title	Artist(s)	Album	Certifications	Details
2016	"White T-Shirt"	Shinee & Jonghyun	She Is	—	Production, Songwriting
2016	"Crash"	Julian Perretta	Karma	—	Production, Songwriting
2016	"Radar"	Julian Perretta	Karma	—	Production, Songwriting
2016	"Keep Telling Them"	Julian Perretta	Karma	—	Production, Songwriting
2016	"Babylon"	Julian Perretta	Karma	—	Production, Songwriting
2016	"Jeder für Jeden"	Felix Jaehn feat. Herbert Grönemeyer	I	—	Production, Songwriting
2016	"Nothing Like This"	Blonde feat. Craig David	Following My Intuition	BPI: Gold	Production, Songwriting
2016	"Karma"	Alma	TBA	—	Production, Songwriting
2016	"Can't Go Home"	Steve Aoki, Felix Jaehn & Adam Lambert	—	—	Production
2016	"Bonfire"	Felix Jaehn feat. Alma	I	BVMI: Platinum	Production
2017	"Just for One Night"	Blonde feat. Astrid S	TBA	—	Production, Songwriting
2017	"Chasing Highs"	Alma	TBA	BVMI: Gold; BPI: Platinum	Production, Songwriting
2017	"First Time"	Kygo & Ellie Goulding	Kids in Love	RIAA: Gold; CRIA: Platinum; ARIA: Platinum; IRMA: 3× Gold; FIMI: Gold; IFPI DEN: Gold; SNEP: Gold; BPI: Gold	Production, Songwriting
2017	"Hot 2 Touch"	Felix Jaehn feat. Alex Aiono & Hight	I	BVMI: Platinum; FIMI: Gold	Production, Songwriting
2017	"World Can Wait"	Sam Feldt feat. Robert Falcon	Sunrise	—	Production, Songwriting
2018	"Millionaire"	Felix Jaehn feat. Tim Schou	I	—	Production, Songwriting
2018	"One More Day"	Afrojack & Jewelz & Sparks	TBA	—	Songwriting
2018	"Sunrise In The East"	Becky Hill	TBA	BPI: Gold	
2018	"Tumult"	Herbert Grönemeyer	Tumult	BVMI: Platinum	
2018	"None of My Business"	Cher Lloyd	TBA	PMB: Gold	Production, Songwriting
2019	"Baby Girl"	Big Tobz	TBA	—	Production
2019	"M.I.A"	Cher Lloyd	TBA	—	Production
2019	"Sink Deeper"	Moti & Icona Pop	TBA	—	Production, Songwriting
2019	"One Shot"	Prettymuch	Phases	—	Production, Songwriting
2019	"Lonely Night"	Alma	Have You Seen Her	—	Production, Songwriting
2019	"Slow Dance"	AJ Mitchell & Ava Max	TBA	RIAA: Gold	Production, Songwriting
2019	"Some Say"	Nea	TBA	ARIA: Gold; BEA: Platinum; BVMI: Platinum; BPI: Gold; IFPI Denmark: Platinum; IFPI Sweden: Gold; IFPI Finland: Gold; PROMUSICAE: Gold; SNEP: Diamond; ZPAV: 2× Platinum	Production, Songwriting
2019	"Worst Behavior"	Alma & Tove Lo	Have You Seen Her	—	Production, Songwriting
2019	"Somebody Else"	Isac Elliott	TBA	—	Production, Songwriting
2019	"Sparko"	Chip	TBA	—	Production, Songwriting
2020	"Dedicated"	Nea	TBA	—	Production, Songwriting
2020	"Sicko"	Felix Jaehn & Gashi feat. Faangs	TBA	BVMI: Gold	Production, Songwriting
2020	"Stay All Night"	Alma	Have You Seen Her	—	Production, Songwriting
2020	"So Good"	Whethan & Bülow	TBA	—	Songwriting
2020	"My Girl"	Alma	Have You Seen Her	—	Production, Songwriting
2020	"TG4M (Spotify Session)"	Nea	TBA	—	Production
2020	"Lost"	Cher Lloyd	TBA	—	Production
2020	"TGTL"	Justin Jesso	TBA	—	Production
2020	"No Therapy"	Felix Jaehn feat. Nea & Bryn Christopher	TBA	BVMI: Gold	Production
2021	"Pillow"	Kelvin Jones	TBA	-	Production & Songwriting
2021	"Call You Mine"	David Puentez feat. Nina Chuba	TBA	-	Production & Songwriting
2021	"Candy Flip"	Eldzhey	TBA	-	Production & Songwriting
2022	"UonU"	Yung Bleu & Kaliii	TBA	-	Production & Songwriting
2022	"Femminello"	Nina Chuba	Glas	-	Production & Songwriting
2022	"Vanish"	Dro Kenji	TBA	-	Production & Songwriting
2022	"Hopeless Heart"	Keanu Silva & Toby Romeo feat. Sasha	TBA	-	Production & Songwriting
2022	"Crown"	Seulgi of Red Velvet	28 Reasons	-	Production & Songwriting
2023	"In The Morning"	Imanbek & Trevor Daniel	TBA	-	Production & Songwriting
2023	"Solo"	Nina Chuba	Glas	-	Production & Songwriting
2023	"Sommer"	Casper & Cro	Nur Liebe Immer	-	Production & Songwriting
2023	"I cant be the only one"	Sera & Younotus	TBA	-	Production & Songwriting
2025	"Show Me Love"	WizTheMc & "bees & honey"	YEBO		Co-Production

=== Singles ===
Title	Year	Peak chart positions		Certifications	Album
Title	Year	DEN	SWE	Certifications	Album
"Cut the Cord" (with Felix Jaehn)	2016	—	—		Non-album singles
"I'm in Love with the Coco"	2016	33	99		Non-album singles
"Cover Girls" (featuring Bibi Bourelly)	2017	—	—		Non-album singles
"Shoulder"	2017	—	—		Non-album singles
"—" denotes a single that did not chart or was not released in that territory.

=== Remixes ===
2015

- Rihanna – "Bitch Better Have My Money"
- Rae Sremmurd – "No Type"
- Becky G – "Can’t Stop Dancing"
- Sam Smith – "Fast Car"
- The King's Son and Shaggy – "I’m Not Rich"
- Ed Sheeran – "Coco"
- Lost Frequencies featuring Janieck Devy – "Reality"
- Sumera — "Wolf"

2016

- Parson James – "Temple"
- Jay Sean & Sean Paul – "Make My Love Go"
- Rhodes – "Wishes"

2017

- Zara Larsson – "Only You"
