= Leony =

German pop singer (born 1997)

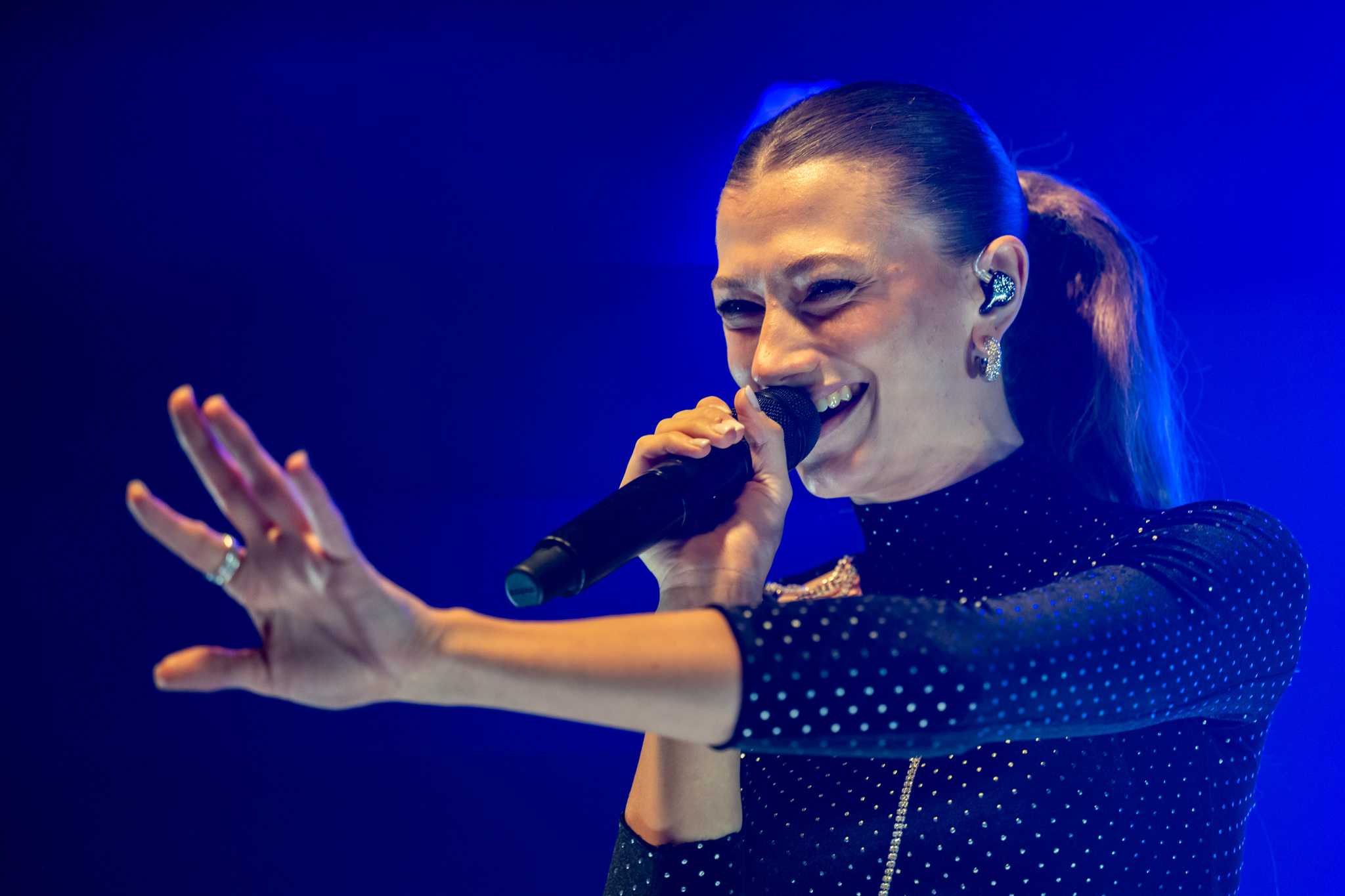
- Leony in 2024

Background information
- Born: Leonie Burger; 25 June 1997 (age 29); Cham, Bavaria, Germany
- Genres: Pop, Dance-Pop, Electropop, EDM
- Occupation: Singer
- Years active: 2017–present
- Labels: Balalaika, Kontor
- Formerly of: Unknown Passenger
- Website: leonymusic.com

Leonie Burger (born 25 June 1997), mononymously known as Leony, is a German pop singer-songwriter.

== Career ==
Along with Julian Vogl and Maximillian Böhle, Leonie Burger performed on RTL's Rising Star as part of the band 'Unknown Passenger'. In the finale, they received 92.77% of the audience's vote for their version of "Stay". She got to know her early band manager Nik Hafermann through the show. The band had a few appearances in smaller clubs, but the group disbanded shortly thereafter. Leonie performed as a solo artist from then on, using a slightly modified spelling of her first name as her stage name.

In 2016, Leony signed with Sony Music in Australia, subsequently undertaking a lot of vocal coaching. Her first songs were produced in Sweden, with her releasing her first debut single "Surrender" in 2017. The song was used in a Sylvie Meis underwear commercial. The single "Boots" was released in 2018, with "More Than Friends" following in 2019.

In 2020, Leony moved over to a different brand, with Vitali Zestovskih and Mark Becker becoming her new managers and producers. Together with DJ duo Vize and Sam Feldt she released her new single "Far Away from Home". Her breakthrough came in July 2020 with her remake of Modern Talking's song "Brother Louie" in collaboration with Vize, Kazakh artist Imanbek and the former Modern Talking member, Dieter Bohlen.

In 2022, Leony was a music mentor for Emilia in Dein Song, a reality television music competition on German broadcaster ZDF.

In 2023, she featured as a judge on the 20th season of German reality talent show Deutschland sucht den Superstar.

In 20 March 2024, Leony was confirmed to join OneRepublic and Meduza in the production of the UEFA Euro 2024 theme song, replacing Kim Petras who couldn't participate due to "scheduling issues".

In 2026, Leony was featured as a coach on the fourteenth season of The Voice Kids.

== Personal life ==
Her brother, Korbinian Burger, is a professional football player. Leony lives in Berlin.

== TV shows ==
- 2014: Rising Star (as a participant)
- 2023: Deutschland sucht den Superstar (as a judge)
- 2024: Schlag den Star (as a participant)
- 2024: The Voice Kids (as a guest coach)
- 2026: The Voice Kids (as a coach)

== Discography ==
=== Albums ===
List of albums, with selected chart positions
Title	Album details	Peak chart positions		Certifications
Title	Album details	GER	AUT	Certifications
Somewhere in Between	Released: 24 March 2023; Label: Central Station, Kontor; Format: 2×CD, digital	20	28	NVPI: Gold
Oldschool Love	Released: 28 February 2025; Label: Central Station, Kontor; Format: CD, LP, digital	12	24	

=== Charted singles ===
Title	Details	Peak chart positions										
Title	Details	GER	AUT	BEL (FL)	FRA	NLD	ROM Air.	SWI	UK Digital	KAZ Air.		
"Brother Louie" (Vize x Imanbek x Dieter Bohlen featuring Leony)	2020	64	58	—	—	—	—	—	—	—		Non-album singles
"Paradise" (with Joker Bra and Vize)	2020	4	2	—	—	—	—	98	—	—	BVMI: Platinum	Non-album singles
"Merry Christmas Everyone" (with Vize)	2020	71	—	—	—	—	—	—	—	—		Home Alone (On the Night Before Christmas) (Sampler)
"Faded Love"	2021	17	11	31	—	58	—	24	—	—	BVMI: Gold	Somewhere in Between
"Easy Peasy" (with Finch Asozial and Vize)	2021	70	—	—	—	—	—	—	—	—		Non-album single
"Friendships (Lost My Love)" (Pascal Letoublon featuring Leony)	2021	20	23	—	—	—	—	—	—	—		Non-album single
"Raindrops" (Katja Krasavice featuring Leony)	2021	1	33	—	—	—	—	—	—	—		Non-album single
"Remedy"	2022	5	9	—	—	—	—	17	—	—	BVMI: Platinum	Somewhere in Between
"Follow" (Kontra K featuring Sido and Leony)	2022	3	8	—	—	—	—	—	—	—	BVMI: Platinum	Non-album single
"Crazy Love" (with Toby Romeo)	2022	— (Note: "Crazy Love" did not enter the main German singles chart, but peaked at number 15 on the Trending Singles Chart (28 October 2022).)	—	—	—	—	—	—	—	—		Somewhere in Between
"Somewhere in Between"	2023	54	—	—	—	—	8	—	—	—		Somewhere in Between
"I Can Feel" (with Niklas Dee and Vize)	2023	77	—	—	100	—	—	—	—	—		Oldschool Love
"Waking Up" (with Felix Jaehn)	2024	96	—	—	—	—	—	—	—	—		Non-album single
"Simple Life"	2024	84	—	—	—	—	—	—	—	—		Oldschool Love
"Fire" (Official UEFA Euro 2024 Song) (with OneRepublic and Meduza)	2024	29	49	45	—	16	—	68	—	—		Oldschool Love
"Rock n Roll" (with G-Eazy)	2024	55	—	—	—	—	—	—	—	—		Oldschool Love
"By Your Side (In My Mind)"	2025	66	—	—	—	—	—	—	—	—		Oldschool Love
"Tell Me Where U Go" (with Clean Bandit & Tiësto)	2025	—	—	—	—	—	—	—	75	—		TBA
"Don't Worry"	2025	36	—	—	—	—	—	—	—	—		TBA
"Stay" (with Calum Scott)	2026	—	—	—	—	—	—	—	—	8		Non-album single
"Moonlight" (with Marcus & Martinus)	2026	—	—	—	—	—	—	—	—	7		Non-album single

== Awards and nominations ==
=== Awards ===
New Music Awards

- 2021: "Durchstarter/in des Jahres" (Up-and-Comer of the Year)

=== Nominations ===
1 Live Krone

- 2021: "Bester Dance Act" (Best Dance Act)
- 2021: "Beste Single" (Best Single; for Faded Love)
- 2022: "Beste Künstlerin" (Best Female Artist)
- 2022: "Bester Song des Jahres" (Best Song of the Year; for Remedy)
- 2022: "Bester Hip-Hop/R&B Song" (Best Hip-Hop/R&B Song; for Follow)

New Faces Awards

- 2021: Music
