= Linnea Södahl =

Swedish singer and songwriter

Nea
- Born: Anna Linnea Södahl; 17 September 1987 (age 38); Port Elizabeth, South Africa
- Origin: Alingsås, Sweden
- Genres: Pop
- Occupations: Singer; songwriter
- Years active: 2014–present
- Label: Sony Music

Anna Linnea Södahl (born 17 September 1987), also known as simply Nea, is a Swedish singer and songwriter.

== Early life and education ==
Södahl was born in South Africa to Swedish parents. Her parents were residing in South Africa as missionaries for the Church of Sweden, but also performed undercover missions supporting efforts to combat apartheid. When Södahl was three years old, the family returned to Sweden, where she was raised in Alingsås. Södahl returned to South Africa as a teenager, working as a volunteer for three months at an orphanage and writing music with the non-profit organization Star For Life.

Södahl studied songwriting and producing at Musikmakarna in Örnsköldsvik, graduating in 2015.

== Music career ==
As a songwriter Nea has been using her real name, Linnea Södahl, and has written songs for Zara Larsson, Tove Styrke, Tinie Tempah, Felix Jaehn, Twice and Axwell, among others. Her songs have received a total of almost two billion streams worldwide on Spotify. One of her most famous songs, Lush Life, which became an international hit and the most played song in Sweden during the summer of 2015, has sold ten times platinum in Sweden and platinum in the UK and US. As for Swedish artists, Södahl has, in addition to Zara Larsson, Axwell and Tove Styrke, also written songs for Linnea Henriksson, Sabina Ddumba, Skott, Kasbo and Shy Martin.

On 22 December 2019, Nea was placed number one as a singer and number three as a songwriter on Svensktoppen with the songs "Some Say" (which interpolates Eiffel 65's "Blue (Da Ba Dee)") and "Fira jul med mig" (performed by Linnea Henriksson). Other Swedish artists she has written for are Sabina Ddumba, Skott, Kasbo and SHY Martin.

On 6 September 2019 Södahl released her first own song as an artist under the artist name Nea. The debut single "Some Say" was released through Milkshake Label (Sony Music Sweden) and became a major international hit and the 13th most played song on European radio in 2020.

In Sweden, the song was on Svensktoppen for 57 weeks. On 10 January 2020 a remix of "Some Say" made by German DJ Felix Jaehn was released.

On 12 June 2020 Nea released her debut EP "Some Say EP" which in addition to "Some Say" also included the singles "Dedicated", "TG4M" and "Drunk Enough To".

Nea performed at the Spanish music festival Los40 Music Award in 2020 and received two nominations, where she won in the category "Best international dance".

Södahl co-wrote English singer Melanie C's single "What Could Possibly Go Wrong?" with the latter and Klas Åhlund, which was released on 29 January 2026.

== Discography ==
=== Extended plays ===
Title	Details
Some Say	Released: 12 June 2020; Label: Milkshake, Sony; Formats: Digital download, streaming

=== Singles ===
==== As lead artist ====
Title	Year	Peak chart positions										Certification	Album
Title	Year	SWE	AUS	AUT	BEL (Fla)	BEL (Wal)	FRA	GER	NOR	SLK	UK	Certification	Album
"Some Say"	2019	12	13	9	4	1	14	15	6	1	89	ARIA: 2× Platinum; BPI: Silver; BVMI: Platinum; IFPI AUT: 2× Platinum; SNEP: Diamond	Some Say
"Dedicated"	2020	—	—	—	—	—	—	—	—	—	—		Some Say
"TG4M"	2020	86	—	—	—	—	—	—	—	—	—		Non-album singles
"Diablo" (with Nio Garcia)	2020	—	—	—	— (Note: "Diablo" did not enter the Tipparade of Flanders, but did enter the Bubbling Under.)	— (Note: "Diablo" did not enter the Tipparade of Wallonia, but did enter the Bubbling Under.)	—	—	—	—	—		Non-album singles
"Don't Deserve This" (with Sandro Cavazza or Tibz)	2021	—	—	—	—	—	—	—	—	—	—		Non-album singles
"Sucker for You"	2021	—	—	—	—	—	—	—	—	—	—		Non-album singles
"Heard About Me" (with Dimitri Vegas & Like Mike and Felix Jaehn)	2021	—	—	—	—	—	—	—	—	—	—		Breathe
"No Regrets" (with Shy Martin)	2021	—	—	—	—	—	—	—	—	—	—		Non-album singles
"Angels"	2024	— (Note: "Angels" did not enter the Swedish Singles Chart, but peaked at number 18 on the Swedish Heatseeker chart.)	—	—	—	—	—	—	—	—	—		Non-album singles

==== As featured artist ====
Title	Year	Peak chart positions				Album
Title	Year	AUT	BEL (Fla)	BEL (Wal)	GER	Album
"No Therapy" (Felix Jaehn featuring Nea and Bryn Christopher)	2020	64	— (Note: "No Therapy" did not enter the Tipparade of Flanders, but did enter the Bubbling Under.)	— (Note: "No Therapy" did not enter the Tipparade of Wallonia, but did enter the Bubbling Under.)	14	Breathe

== Awards ==
Year	Award	Category	Result	Ref.
2008	Svensktoppen nästa	P4 Göteborg	Won	
2016	Denniz Pop Awards	Rookie Songwriter of the Year	Won	
2016	Musikförläggarnas pris	The Song of the Year	Won	
2016	Musikförläggarnas pris	The Most Played Song of the Year	Won	
2017	SKAP-galan	Topliner Award	Won	
2020	Grammisgalan 2020	Composer of the Year	Nominated	
2020	NRJ Music Awards	Best Debutant of the Year	Nominated	
2020	LOs40 Music Awards	Best International Debutant of the Year	Nominated	
2020	LOs40 Music Awards	Best international Dance of the Year	Won	
2020	P3 Guld	Artist of the Future	Nominated	
2020	Music Moves Europe Talent Awards	Best Pop	Nominated	
