= I (Felix Jaehn album) =

Studio album by Felix Jaehn
- Released: 16 February 2018
- Recorded: 2015–17
- Genre: Dance; tropical house; EDM
- Length: 76:29
- Label: L'Agentur; Virgin
- Producer: Felix Jaehn (exec.); Michael Geldreich; Christopher Vitorino de Almeida; Hitimpulse; Adam Trigger; Jimmy Harry; Jonas Jeberg; Thomas Troelsen; Sam Higgins; Patrick Nissley; Hight; Mike Spencer; Mike Williams; Sondr; Nikodem Milewski; Tonino Speciale; Aiko Rohd; Jeff Bhasker; Emile Haynie; Lost Frequencies; Aden x Olson; Mark Foster; Omi; Specialist

Felix Jaehn chronology
Felix Jaehn (2016)	I (2018)	I Remixed (2018)

Felix Jaehn studio album chronology
I (2018)	Breathe (2021)

Singles from I
- 1. "Eagle Eyes" Released: 3 November 2014; 2. "Ain't Nobody (Loves Me Better)" Released: 3 April 2015; 3. "Book of Love" Released: 11 September 2015; 4. "Jeder für jeden" Released: 22 April 2016; 5. "Bonfire" Released: 15 July 2016; 6. "Hot2Touch" Released: 12 May 2017; 7. "Feel Good" Released: 4 August 2017; 8. "Like a Riddle" Released: 6 October 2017; 9. "Cool" Released: 9 February 2018; 10. "Jennie" Released: 16 February 2018

I is the debut studio album by German DJ and record producer Felix Jaehn. It was released on 16 February 2018 by L'Agentur and Virgin Records. The album features guest vocals by Marc E. Bassy, Gucci Mane, Jasmine Thompson, Polina, Alma, and Herbert Grönemeyer.

== Track listing ==
Note: Tracklist adapted from iTunes.

No.	Title	Writer(s)	Producer(s)	Length
1.	"Cool" (featuring Marc E. Bassy and Gucci Mane)	Felix Jaehn; Scott Friedman; Richard Mackowitz; Micah Premnath; Radric Davis; Jonas Jeberg	Jaehn; Jeberg; Michael Geldreich	3:10
2.	"Jennie" (featuring R. City and Bori)	Jaehn; Markus Sepehrmanesh; Thomas Troelsen; Theron Thomas; Timothy Thomas	Jaehn; Troelsen^{[a]}; Christophe de Almeida^{[b]}	3:04
3.	"Don't Say Love" (featuring Rothchild)	Jaehn; Bruce Fielder; Robert Harvey; Günes Ergün	Jaehn; Sam Higgins^{[a]}	3:09
4.	"Honolulu" (featuring Matluck)	Jaehn; Viktoria Hansen; Maxwell Matluck; Kevin Eagle; Michael Geldreich; Christophe Vitorino de Almeida	Jaehn; Geldreich^{[a]}; Patrick Nissley^{[b]}	2:53
5.	"Hot2Touch" (with Hight and Alex Aiono)	Jaehn; Mark Ralph; Cass Lowe; Thomas Walker; Timothy Deal	Jaehn; Hight; Hitimpulse^{[a]}; Mike Spencer^{[b]}	3:25
6.	"Like a Riddle" (featuring Hearts & Colors and Adam Trigger)	Jaehn; Adam Trigger; Aiko Rohd; Steven Bashir; Florent Hugel	Jaehn; de Almeida^{[a]}; Trigger^{[a]}	2:59
7.	"Better" (featuring Clara Mae)	Jaehn; Cassandra Ströberg; Clara Hagman; David Bjoerk; Walid Ben Marieme	Jaehn; Trigger^{[a]}	3:22
8.	"On a Body Like You" (featuring Rachel Salvit)	Jaehn; Jenna Andrews; Rachel Salvit; James Nosanow	Jaehn; Jimmy Harry^{[a]}; Geldreich^{[a]}	2:52
9.	"Millionaire" (featuring Tim Schou)	Jaehn; Sepehrmanesh; Jonas Kalisch; Henrik Meinke; Alexsej Vlasenko; Jeremy Chacon; Timothy Schou	Jaehn; Hitimpulse^{[a]}	2:33
10.	"Feel Good" (with Mike Williams)	Jaehn; Michael Willemsen; Andrew Bullimore; Nicholas Gale	Jaehn; Mike Williams; Geldreich^{[a]}	2:47
11.	"Forever Young" (featuring Lxandra)	Jaehn; Philipp Albinger; Jonas Shandel; Marcus Brosch; Alexandra "Lxandra" Lehti; de Almeida	Jaehn; de Almeida^{[a]}	2:33
12.	"LOV" (featuring Sondr and Andrew Jackson)	Jaehn; Andrew Jackson; Lorenzo Cosi; Yusekai A Koi	Jaehn; Sondr^{[a]}; Nikodem Milewski^{[b]}; de Almeida^{[b]}	2:43
13.	"Figure You Out"	Jaehn; Tonino Speciale; Karen Harding	Jaehn; Geldreich^{[a]}; Tonino Speciale^{[a]}^{[c]}	2:52
14.	"Last Summer" (featuring Troi Irons)	Jaehn; Troi Irons; Jaakko Manninen	Jaehn; Geldreich^{[a]}	3:20
15.	"Cut the Cord (Acoustic)" (featuring Patrik Jean)	Jeahn; Simone Porter; Rohd; Patrik Jean	Jaehn; Rohd^{[a]}	3:51
16.	"Ain't Nobody (Loves Me Better)" (featuring Jasmine Thompson)	David Wolinski	Jaehn	3:06
17.	"Book of Love" (featuring Polina)	Jaehn; Nosanow; Polina Goudieva	Jaehn; Harry^{[a]}	3:18
18.	"Bonfire" (featuring Alma)	Jaehn; Alma-Sofia Miettinen; Joseph Walter; Pascal Reinhardt	Jaehn; Hitimpulse	3:03
19.	"Photograph (Felix Jaehn Remix)" (with Ed Sheeran)	Edward Christopher Sheeran; Johnny McDaid; Martin Harrington; Thomas Leonard	Jaehn; Jeff Bhasker^{[d]}; Emile Haynie^{[d]}	3:04
20.	"Eagle Eyes" (featuring Lost Frequencies and Linying)	Jaehn; Felix de Laet; Lin Ying	Jaehn; Lost Frequencies	3:15
21.	"I Do"	Jaehn	Jaehn	3:30
22.	"Cloud 9 (Felix Jaehn Remix)" (with Aden x Olson)	Aden Jaron; Bjorn Steiner; Jaehn; de Almeida	Jaehn; de Almeida^{[a]}; Trigger^{[b]}; Aden x Olson^{[d]}	3:06
23.	"Stimme" (with Mark Forster as EFF)	Jaehn; Markus Cwiertina; Philipp Steinke	Jaehn; Mark Forster	3:02
24.	"Jeder für Jeden" (with Herbert Grönemeyer)	Jaehn; Herbert Grönemeyer; Geldreich	Jaehn; Hitimpulse	3:22
25.	"Cheerleader (Felix Jaehn Remix / Radio Edit)" (with Omi)	Omar Samuel Pasley; Clifton Dillon; Mark Bradford; Ryan Dillon; Lowell Dunbar	Jaehn; Omi^{[d]}; Specialist^{[d]}	3:02
Total length:				1:16:29

Notes

- ^{^[a]} signifies a co-producer
- ^{^[b]} signifies an additional producer
- ^{^[c]} signifies a vocal producer
- ^{^[d]} signifies an original producer

== Charts ==
Weekly chart performance for I
Chart (2018)	Peak position
Austrian Albums (Ö3 Austria)	26
Belgian Albums (Ultratop Wallonia)	192
Dutch Albums (Album Top 100)	180
German Albums (Offizielle Top 100)	5
Swiss Albums (Schweizer Hitparade)	26

== Certifications ==
Certifications for I
Region	Certification	Certified units/sales
Austria (IFPI Austria)	Gold	7,500^{‡}
Canada (Music Canada)	Platinum	80,000^{‡}
France (SNEP)	Gold	50,000^{‡}
Poland (ZPAV)	Gold	10,000^{‡}
United Kingdom (BPI)	Silver	60,000^{‡}
^{‡} Sales+streaming figures based on certification alone.
