= Time Machine (Alma album) =

Studio album by Alma
- Released: 21 April 2023
- Length: 36:28
- Label: PME; Epic
- Producer: Elvira Anderfjärd; Fat Max Gsus; OzGo; DECCO; A Strut

Alma chronology
Have U Seen Her? (2020)	Time Machine (2023)

Singles from Time Machine
- 1. "Everything Beautiful" Released: 1 July 2022; 2. "I Forgive Me" Released: 12 August 2022; 3. "Summer Really Hurt Us" Released: 23 September 2022; 4. "Hey Mom Hey Dad" Released: 20 January 2023; 5. "Tell Mama" Released: 31 March 2023

Time Machine is the second studio album by Finnish singer and songwriter Alma. It was released through PME Records and Epic Records on 21 April 2023. It was preceded by the release of five singles "Everything Beautiful", "I Forgive Me", "Summer Really Hurt Us", "Hey Mom Hey Dad" and "Tell Mama".

== Background ==
After a two-year hiatus, Alma started to tease a new single from her new era starting from June 3, 2022. On March 2, 2023, Alma announced that her second studio album will be released on April 21, 2023. Alma unveiled the album's official cover, its title and release date on March 2, 2023.

== Composition ==
On Time Machine, Alma pulls her guard down to reflect on more emotionally charged, intimate troubles – her origins, parents, twin sister, relationships, queer identity, pop star pressures and regrets – with a new sound that embraces her spiritual predecessors.

== Singles ==
"Everything Beautiful" was released as the lead single from the album on July 1, 2023. "I Forgive Me" was released on August 12, 2022, as the second track from the album. Alma dropped "Summer Really Hurt Us" on September 23, 2022, as the third track. "Hey Mom Hey Dad" was released on January 20, 2023, as the fourth track. "Tell Mama" was released as the fifth and final track on March 31, 2023.

== Critical reception ==
Professional ratings
Review scores
Source	Rating
DIY	4/5 stars
Dork	3/5 stars
The Line of Best Fit	6/10
The Observer	3/5 stars

DIY's writer Otis Robinson wrote that "Throughout [Time Machine], Alma sits within a kaleidoscope of psychedelic Scandipop pop-rock, each track swelling in whispering grandiosity, as if ABBA were put into a melting pot with Elton John, David Bowie, and even a bit of trippy newbies Lime Garden.
Laura Freyaldenhoven from Dork described the albums as "very much brimming with flaming lyricism, exhilarating bridges and the soaring vocals that have become Alma's trademark" and also stated that "Honest and undeniably personal, Alma has created a second album that not only reiterates the extent of her musical prowess but allows us to meet her in a different setting – off stage, "before". Her origin story. Writing for The Line of Best Fit, Emma Thimgren gave the album score 6 out of 10 and commented that "'Time Machine'” as a whole takes very few risks. In comparison to her earlier work, it's too easily digested and frictionless. The album is a great palate cleanse, but hopefully next time we will get that raw energy back. The Observer's Ammar Kalia noted that "[Time Machine] shows admirable maturity for the 27-year-old, but while her lyrics might be more nuanced, the music becomes homogeneous without the danceable thump of her earlier work.

== Track listing ==
Time Machine track listing
No.	Title	Writer(s)	Producer(s)	Length
1.	"Dreaming"	Alma-Sofia Miettinen; Elvira Anderfjärd	Anderfjärd	2:27
2.	"Everything Beautiful"	Miettinen; Max Grahn	Fat Max Gsus	2:20
3.	"Tell Mama"	Miettinen; Anderfjärd; Oscar Görres	OzGo	2:49
4.	"Summer Really Hurt Us"	Miettinen; Joacim Persson; Sebastian Arman	DECCO	2:47
5.	"Time Machine"	Miettinen; Anderfjärd; Tove Burman	Anderfjärd	2:50
6.	"Natalia"	Miettinen; Anderfjärd; Tove Burman	Anderfjärd	2:48
7.	"I Forgive Me"	Miettinen; Ludvig Söderberg; Grahn	A Strut; Fat Max Gsus	2:16
8.	"Run Run Run"	Miettinen; Max Grahn	Fat Max Gsus	3:15
9.	"The Cure"	Miettinen; Max Grahn	Fat Max Gsus	3:07
10.	"Stupid People"	Miettinen; Anderfjärd; Tove Burman	Anderfjärd	2:15
11.	"One In a Million"	Miettinen; Anderfjärd	Anderfjärd	2:59
12.	"I Will Survive"	Miettinen; Görres; Klara Söderberg	OzGo	3:34
13.	"Hey Mom Hey Dad"	Miettinen; Anderfjärd; Burman	Anderfjärd	2:54
Total length:				36:28

== Charts ==
Chart performance for Time Machine
Chart (2023)	Peak position
Finnish Albums (Suomen virallinen lista)	10
