= Have U Seen Her? =

Studio album by Alma
- Released: 15 May 2020
- Length: 37:00
- Label: PME; Epic; Warner; RCA
- Producer: 23rd; DFA; Andrew Wyatt; Digital Farm Animals; Hitimpulse; Novaa; Matt Zara; Al Shux; Stint; Shawn Wasabi; Hank Solo; Gustav Nystrom

Alma chronology
Have You Seen Her? (Part 2) (2020)	Have U Seen Her? (2020)	Time Machine (2023)

Singles from Have U Seen Her?
- 1. "Bad News Baby" Released: 22 November 2019; 2. "Stay All Night" Released: 31 March 2020; 3. "LA Money" Released: 12 June 2020

Have U Seen Her? is the debut studio album by Finnish singer and songwriter Alma. It was released through PME Records on 15 May 2020. It was preceded by the release of two extended plays Have U Seen Her? Part 1 and Have U Seen Her? Part 2 on 1 November 2019 and 13 March 2020, respectively, and one single "Bad News Baby" on 22 November 2019. The album was produced and written by Justin Tranter, Andrew Wyatt and Sarah Hudson, among others.

== Composition ==
The Line of Best Fit described the album as: "...is filled with the catchy soundscapes we’ve come to know and love while seesawing within a new, mature experimental sonic range."

== Singles ==
The lead single of the album titled "Bad News Baby" was released on 22 November 2019 along with its music video. The title track was not the official single from the album, but had a music video released on 1 November 2019. "Stay All Night" was released as the second single on 31 March 2020 from the album, along with a quarantine music video. "LA Money" was sent to radio air play on 21 June 2020 as the third single from the album.

== Critical reception ==
Professional ratings
Aggregate scores
Source	Rating
Metacritic	72/100
Review scores
Source	Rating
Clash	7/10
Dork	4/5 stars
Gigwise	6/10
The Line of Best Fit	7.5/10
NME	4/5 stars

Have U Seen Her? was met with generally favourable reviews. At Metacritic, which assigns a normalised rating out of 100 to reviews from professional critics, the album received an average score of 72, based on four reviews. Album of the Year assessed the critical consensus as 71 out of 100, based on four reviews.

In a positive review, Malvika Padin from The Line of Best Fit said about the album: "Truly, the strength of Have U Seen Her? lies in its shift away from the EDM bombardment of Alma past and instead dabbles with a myriad of soundscapes; from the grooving simplicity of 'Stay All Night', the bold pop of 'Bad News Baby' and even the thunderclaps of 'Nightmare', this 12 track offering is an exploration into just where Alma wants to be in 2020. Growth and development aside, if there's one thing that's undeniable it's that Alma can write a chorus. Alma's confidence to explore just where she wants her sound to go is commendable, but her heart-on-sleeve honesty is the most remarkable facet. Overall, Have U Seen Her? strikes a great balance between rocking out with piercing, lacerating soundscapes and soothing nerves with heartfelt songwriting encompassed in diverse melodies. The balance falters at points but it's never irreparable as Alma rights it again with the natural magnetism of her music".

Laura Copley from the Clash said about the album: "The album's opening song and namesake 'Have U Seen Her' is perhaps an unusual track to begin with, given that its hip-hop, M.I.A-esque sound doesn't appear all that frequently thereafter. Autotune is also very prevalent on this track, and perhaps masks Alma's natural gift of being a near-flawless vocalist. Overall, it doesn't justify the rest of the album - yet this is just a mere setback with what is to come."

Writing for Gigwise, Toby Bryant said: "Whilst it's the dizzying, alcohol-fuelled nights that come with sudden stardom which drive Alma's debut LP, through the mist the 24-year-old has a fascinating story to tell. Have U Seen Her? is the tale of an artist who won't fit into any box".

== Track listing ==
No.	Title	Writer(s)	Producer(s)	Length
1.	"Have U Seen Her?"	Alma-Sofia Miettinen; Henry Flint; George Flint	23rd	2:41
2.	"LA Money"	Miettinen; Justin Tranter; Sarah Hudson; Nicholas Gale	DFA; Andrew Wyatt; Digital Farm Animals	2:53
3.	"Worst Behavior" (featuring Tove Lo)	Miettinen; Maria Hazell; Jeremy Chacon; Jonas Kalisch; Alexsej Vlasenko; Henrik Meinke; Ebba Tove Elsa Nilsson	Hitimpulse	2:41
4.	"Stay All Night"	Miettinen; Hazell; Chacon; Kalisch; Vlasenko; Meinke; Vincent Kottkamp	NOVAA; Matt Zara; Digital Farm Animals; Hitimpulse	2:47
5.	"Bad News Baby"	Miettinen; Kennedi Lykken; Joseph Janiak; Ajay Bhattacharya; Alexander Shuckburgh	Al Shux; Stint	3:20
6.	"Nightmare"	Miettinen; Madison Love; Tranter; Shawn Wasabi	Wasabi	2:31
7.	"Mama"	Miettinen; Tranter; Mark Ralph; Timucin Aluo	Wasabi	2:58
8.	"King of the Castle"	Miettinen; Henri Salonen	Hank Solo	3:27
9.	"My Girl"	Miettinen; Hazell; Chacon; Kalisch; Vlasenko; Meinke; Kottkamp; Linnea Sodahl	Hitimpulse	3:27
10.	"Find Me"	Miettinen; Bjorn Yttling; Gustav Nystrom	Nystrom	3:17
11.	"Loser"	Miettinen; Hudson; Jesse Saint John; Gale	DFA	3:12
12.	"Final Fantasy"	Miettinen; Lykken; Janiak; Wasabi	Wasabi	3:38
Total length:				37:00

Have U Seen Her? (Part I)
No.	Title	Writer(s)	Producer(s)	Length
1.	"Have U Seen Her?"	Miettinen; H. Flint; G. Flint	23rd	2:41
2.	"Worst Behavior" (featuring Tove Lo)	Miettinen; Maria Hazell; Jeremy Chacon; Kalisch; Vlasenko; Henrik Meinke; Nilsson	Hitimpulse	2:41
Total length:				5:22

Have U Seen Her? (Part II)
No.	Title	Writer(s)	Producer(s)	Length
1.	"Stay All Night"	Miettinen; Hazell; Chacon; Kalisch; Vlasenko; Meinke; Vincent Kottkamp	NOVAA; Zara; Digital Farm Animals; Hitimpulse	2:47
2.	"King of the Castle"	Miettinen; Henri Salonen	Hank Solo	3:27
3.	"Find Me"	Miettinen; Yttling; Nystrom	Nystrom	3:17
Total length:				9:31

Have U Seen Her? (Acoustic)
No.	Title	Writer(s)	Length
1.	"Bad News Baby"	Miettinen; Kennedi Lykken; Joseph Janiak; Ajay Bhattacharya; Alexander Shuckburgh	3:21
2.	"LA Money"	Miettinen; Tranter; Hudson; Gale	2:24
3.	"Stay All Night"	Miettinen; Hazell; Chacon; Kalisch; Vlasenko; Meinke; Vincent Kottkamp	2:48
Total length:			8:33

== Charts ==
Chart performance for Have U Seen Her?
Chart (2020)	Peak position
Finnish Albums (Suomen virallinen lista)	1
