= Karma (Alma song) =

Single by Alma

from the EP Dye My Hair
- Released: 3 June 2016
- Recorded: 2016
- Genre: Pop
- Length: 3:18
- Label: PME Records
- Songwriter(s): Jenson Vaughan; Henrik Meinke; Jonas Kalisch; Alma Miettinen; Jeremy Chacon; Alexsej Vlasenko

Alma singles chronology
"Muuta ku mä" (2015)	"Karma" (2016)	"Bonfire" (2016)

"Karma" is a song performed by Finnish singer-songwriter Alma. The song was released in Finland as a digital download on 3 June 2016 as the lead single from her debut extended play Dye My Hair (2016). The song peaked at number five on the Finnish Singles Chart and number 100 on the Swedish Singles Chart.

== Music video ==
A music video to accompany the release of "Karma" was first released onto YouTube on 1 July 2016 at a total length of three minutes and twenty-one seconds.

== Track listing ==
Digital download
No.	Title	Length
1.	"Karma"	3:18

Karma (Remixes)
No.	Title	Length
1.	"Karma" (Femme En Fourrure Remix)	3:40
2.	"Karma" (Katerina & JL Pillowfight Remix)	4:52
3.	"Karma" (KASPERG Remix)	3:29
4.	"Karma" (Laz Perkins Remix)	3:11
5.	"Karma" (POSTAAL Remix)	3:53
6.	"Karma" (Vince Remix)	3:18
Total length:		22:23

== Charts ==
Weekly chart performance for "Karma"
Chart (2016)	Peak position
Finland Radio (Suomen virallinen radiolistasijoitus)	13
Finland Sales (Suomen virallinen singlelista)	1
Finland Streaming (Suomen virallinen striimilistasijoitus)	6
Sweden (Sverigetopplistan)	100

== Release history ==
Release dates for "Karma"
Region	Date	Format	Label
Finland	3 June 2016	Digital download	PME Records
