= Cowboy (Alma song) =

Single by Alma
- Released: October 10, 2018
- Length: 3:08
- Label: PME; Virgin
- Songwriter(s): Alma-Sofia Miettinen; Justin Tranter; Sarah Hudson
- Producer(s): BloodPop

Alma singles chronology
"Black Car (Acoustic)" (2018)	"Cowboy" (2018)	"When I Die" (2019)

Cowboy is a song by Finnish singer Alma. The song was written by Alma, Justin Tranter, Sarah Hudson and BloodPop, and produced by BloodPop. The song was released as a single on through PME Records on October 10, 2018. The music video for the single was directed by Mikka Lommi and released on October 26, 2018. The music video was nominated in the category of Video of the Year at the Emma Awards in 2019. Lyric video of the song was released on October 10, 2018. The song was in the top ten of Finland in components such as streaming, sales and radio.

== Track listing ==
Digital download
No.	Title	Length
1.	"Cowboy"	3:08

Digital download
No.	Title	Length
1.	"Cowboy" (Acoustic Version)	2:56

Digital download
No.	Title	Length
1.	"Cowboy" (Just Kiddin Remix)	4:20

== Charts ==
Weekly chart performance for "Cowboy"
Chart (2018)	Peak position
Czech Republic (Rádio – Top 100)	55
Finland Radio (Suomen virallinen radiolistasijoitus)	6
Finland Sales (Suomen virallinen singlelista)	4
Finland Streaming (Suomen virallinen striimilistasijoitus)	9
