= Phases (Alma and French Montana song) =

2017 song

Single by Alma and French Montana
- Released: September 21, 2017
- Length: 3:24
- Label: PME; Virgin
- Composers: Ryan Vojtesak; Rex Kudo; Kaelyn Behr
- Lyricists: Alma-Sofia Miettinen; Charlotte Aitchison; Alexandra Yatchenko; Jonnali Parmenius; Karim Kharbouch
- Producers: Charlie Handsome; Rex Kudo; Styalz Fuego

"Phases" is a song by Finnish singer Alma and Moroccan-American rapper French Montana. The song was written by Alma, Charli XCX, Sasha Sloan, Noonie Bao, French Montana, and its producers Charlie Handsome, Rex Kudo, and Styalz Fuego. The song was released as a single through PME Records on September 21, 2017. The music video for the single was directed by Charli XCX. The video was nominated in the category of Music Video of the Year at the 2017 Emma Awards.

== Background ==
Alma released her debut extended play Dye My Hair in 2016. In 2017, she was featured on Sub Focus' single "Don't You Feel It" and Martin Solveig's single "All Stars". "Phases" was released following Alma's successful solo single "Chasing Highs". In an interview with The Line of Best Fit, Alma spoke of the song's recording process with Charli XCX, saying "We finished the song in Finland and it was very nice for us to hang out there and finish the whole track there. It’s just about teenage phases. When you’re getting drunk Friday and think you like someone, Saturday you wake up like “no” and sometimes you hurt someone else’s feelings".

== Track listing ==
Digital download
No.	Title	Length
1.	"Phases"	3:23

Digital download
No.	Title	Length
1.	"Phases" (Autograf Remix)	3:42

Digital download
No.	Title	Length
1.	"Phases" (KDA Remix)	3:32

Digital download
No.	Title	Length
1.	"Phases" (Acoustic version)	3:33

== Charts ==
Weekly chart performance for "Phases"
Chart (2017)	Peak position
Belgium (Ultratip Bubbling Under Wallonia)	31
Finland Radio (Suomen virallinen radiolistasijoitus)	8
Finland Sales (Suomen virallinen singlelista)	1
Finland Streaming (Suomen virallinen striimilistasijoitus)	14
New Zealand Heatseeker Singles (RMNZ)	9
Sweden (Sverigetopplistan)	82
Switzerland (Schweizer Hitparade)	97
UK Singles (Official Charts)	88
