= Bonfire (Felix Jaehn song) =

Single by Felix Jaehn featuring Alma

from the album I
- Released: 15 July 2016
- Length: 3:03
- Label: L'Agentur; Virgin
- Songwriter(s): Jaehn; Alma-Sofia Miettinen; Joseph Walter; Pascal Reinhardt
- Producer(s): Jaehn; Hitimpulse

Felix Jaehn singles chronology
"Cut the Cord" (2016)	"Bonfire" (2016)	"Your Soul (Holding On)" (2016)

"Bonfire" is a song by German DJ and record producer Felix Jaehn. It was released on 15 July 2016 and features vocals by Finnish singer and songwriter Alma. The song was written by Jaehn, Alma, Joseph Walter and Pascal Reinhardt, and produced by Jaehn and Hitimpulse.

== Charts ==
=== Weekly charts ===
Weekly chart performance for "Bonfire"
Chart (2016)	Peak position
Austria (Ö3 Austria Top 40)	9
Finland Radio (Suomen virallinen radiolistasijoitus)	2
Finland Sales (Suomen virallinen singlelista)	3
Finland Streaming (Suomen virallinen striimilistasijoitus)	16
France (SNEP)	120
Germany (GfK)	3
Netherlands (Single Top 100)	99
Sweden (Sverigetopplistan)	62
Switzerland (Schweizer Hitparade)	39
US Hot Dance/Electronic Songs (Billboard)	43

=== Year-end charts ===
Year-end chart performance for "Bonfire"
Chart (2016)	Position
Austrian Singles Chart	47
German Singles Chart	23

== Certifications ==
Certifications for "Bonfire"
Region	Certification	Certified units/sales
Austria (IFPI Austria)	Platinum	30,000^{‡}
Germany (BVMI)	3× Gold	600,000^{‡}
^{‡} Sales+streaming figures based on certification alone.
