= Chasing Highs =

Single by Alma
- Released: 23 March 2017
- Recorded: 2016
- Genre: Pop; tropical; power pop
- Length: 3:15
- Label: PME; Virgin
- Songwriter(s): Henrik Meinke; Jonas Kalisch; Pascal Reinhardt; Alma Miettinen; Jeremy Chacon; Alexsej Vlasenko

Alma singles chronology
"Dye My Hair" (2016)	"Chasing Highs" (2017)	"Phases" (2017)

"Chasing Highs" is a song performed by Finnish singer-songwriter Alma. The song was released in Finland as a digital download on 23 March 2017 through PME Records. The song peaked at number 10 on the Finnish Singles Chart. The song was written by Henrik Meinke, Jonas Kalisch, Pascal Reinhardt, Alma Miettinen, Jeremy Chacon and Alexsej Vlasenko.

== Music video ==
A music video to accompany the release of "Chasing Highs" was first released onto YouTube on 31 March 2017 at a total length of three minutes and twenty-nine seconds. As of July 2022, the song has received 57 million views on YouTube.

== Track listing ==
Digital download
No.	Title	Length
1.	"Chasing Highs"	3:15

"Chasing Highs" — Acoustic Piano Version
No.	Title	Length
1.	"Chasing Highs" (Acoustic Piano Version)	4:01

"Chasing Highs" — Le Youth Remix
No.	Title	Length
1.	"Chasing Highs" (Le Youth Remix)	3:38

== Charts ==
=== Weekly charts ===
Weekly chart performance for "Chasing Highs"
Chart (2017)	Peak position
Austria (Ö3 Austria Top 40)	22
Czech Republic (Rádio – Top 100)	15
Finland Radio (Suomen virallinen radiolistasijoitus)	7
Finland Sales (Suomen virallinen singlelista)	2
Finland Streaming (Suomen virallinen striimilistasijoitus)	10
Germany (GfK)	17
Ireland (IRMA)	33
Poland (Polish Airplay Top 100)	46
Scotland (OCC)	20
Slovakia (Rádio Top 100)	15
Slovakia (Singles Digitál Top 100)	69
Switzerland (Schweizer Hitparade)	43
UK Singles (OCC)	18

=== Year-end charts ===
Year-end chart performance for "Chasing Highs"
Chart (2017)	Position
Germany (Official German Charts)	79
UK Singles (OCC)	96

== Certifications ==
Certifications for "Chasing Highs"
Region	Certification	Certified units/sales
Germany (BVMI)	Gold	200,000^{‡}
United Kingdom (BPI)	Platinum	600,000^{‡}
^{‡} Sales+streaming figures based on certification alone.

== Release history ==
Region	Date	Format	Label
Finland	23 March 2017	Digital download	PME Records
