= Alma (Finnish singer) =

Finnish singer-songwriter (born 1996)

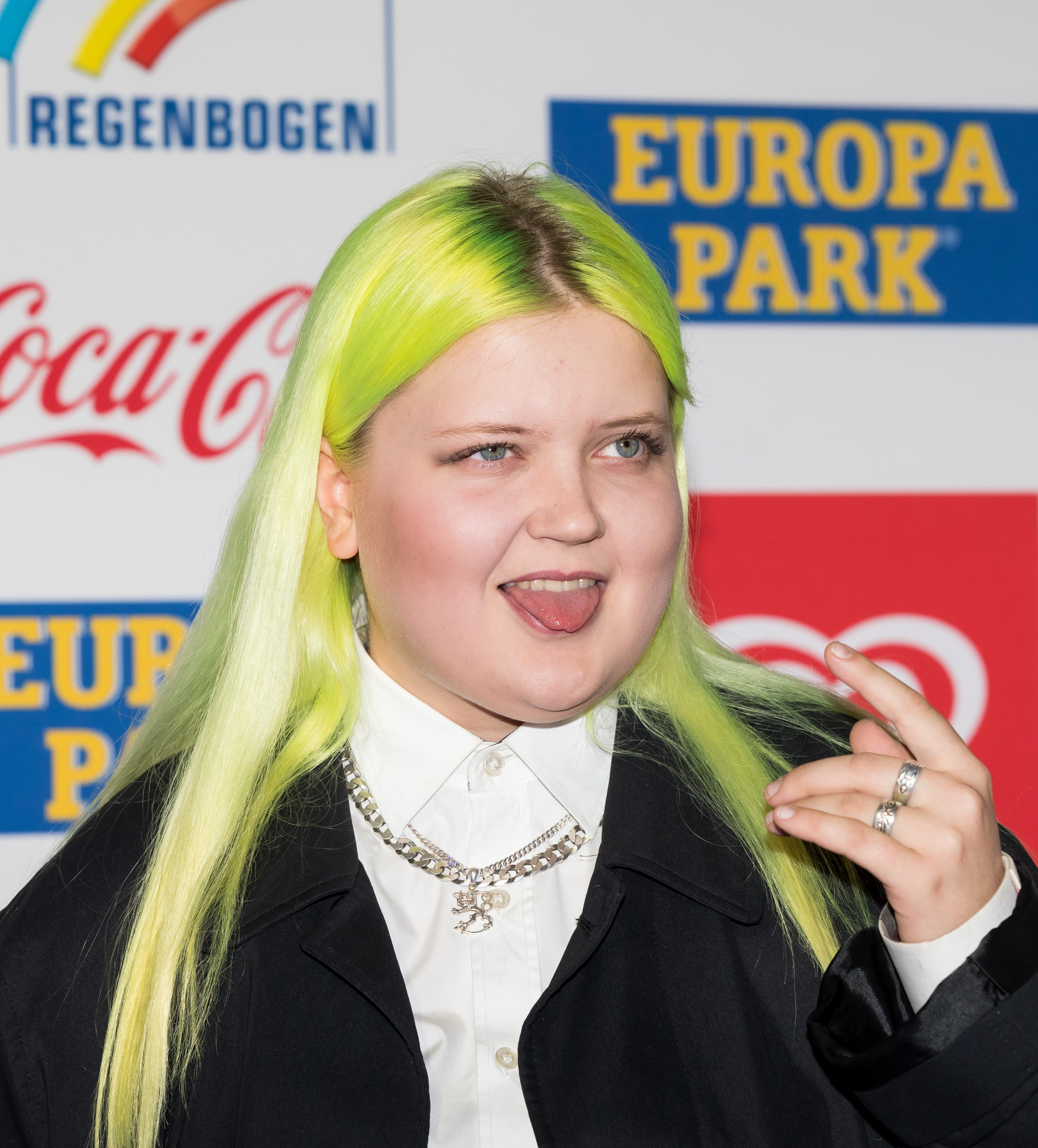
- Alma in 2018

Background information
- Born: Alma-Sofia Miettinen; 17 January 1996 (age 30); Kuopio, Finland
- Genre: Pop
- Occupations: Singer; songwriter
- Instrument: Vocals
- Works: Discography
- Years active: 2013–present
- Labels: PME; Universal; Virgin; Warner Records; Epic; RCA
- Website: cyberalma.com

Alma-Sofia Miettinen (born 17 January 1996), known mononymously as Alma (stylised in all caps), is a Finnish singer and songwriter. Beginning her career in 2013, she placed fifth in the seventh season of the Finnish version of Idol. Her breakthrough came in 2015 when she was featured on Sini Sabotage's single "Muuta ku mä", and was subsequently signed to Universal Music Group.

The following year, she released the singles "Karma" and "Dye My Hair", both of which became top ten hits in Finland. Her 2017 single "Chasing Highs" repeated this success, and also reached the top twenty in Germany and the United Kingdom. She released the extended play (EP), Heavy Rules Mixtape, in 2018, which reached the top ten in Finland. Her debut album, Have U Seen Her? (2020) became her first number-one album in the country, with her second album, Time Machine (2023), moderately entering the top ten.

In addition to her solo work, she has co-written songs for other artists, including Ariana Grande, Miley Cyrus, and Lana Del Rey's "Don't Call Me Angel" (2019), and Cyrus' "Mother's Daughter" and "Slide Away" (2019), all of which charted on the Billboard Hot 100. She has collaborated with many artists including Brooke Candy, Charli XCX, Clean Bandit, Felix Jaehn, French Montana, MØ, and Tove Lo.

== Career ==
=== 2013: Idols ===
In 2013, at age 17, Alma auditioned for the seventh season of Finnish Idols. She progressed to the live shows, where she finished fifth.

Idols performances and results
Episode	Theme	Song	Result
Audition	—N/a	—N/a	Through to live shows
1. Final	—N/a	"Welcome to My Life" – Sunrise Avenue	Safe
3. Final	—N/a	"Price Tag" – Jessie J	Safe
5. Final	—N/a	"Sekaisin" – J. Karjalainen	Safe
7. Final	—N/a	"In the Shadows" – The Rasmus	Eliminated

=== 2015–2016: Dye My Hair and breakthrough ===
In 2015, she was featured on Sini Sabotage's single "Muuta ku mä". In March 2016, Alma was signed to Universal Music, and in June she released her first single "Karma". The song peaked at number 5 on the Finnish Singles Chart. She is also the featured vocalist on the Felix Jaehn song "Bonfire". The song was released as a single in July 2016. In September 2016, Alma was confirmed to play at the 31st edition of Eurosonic Noorderslag in Groningen, NL. On 28 October 2016, she released her debut EP Dye My Hair.

=== 2017: Chasing Highs, Phases and collaborations ===
She released the single "Chasing Highs" in March 2017. The song peaked at number 10 on the Finnish Singles Chart. In June it was released in the UK, and became Alma's first UK top 20 hit. She was featured on the Sub Focus' song "Don't You Feel It", released as a single in May 2017. She was also the featured vocalist on Martin Solveig's song "All Stars" which was released as a single in June 2017. In September 2017, Alma released stand-alone single "Phases" with Moroccan-American rapper French Montana. In December 2017, she collaborated with Charli XCX and Tove Lo on track "Out of My Head" from XCX's fourth mixtape Pop 2.

=== 2018: Heavy Rules Mixtape, Bitches and Cowboy ===
On 26 February 2018, Alma announced that her second extended play which is called Heavy Rules Mixtape will be released on 2 March 2018. The record peaked at number nine in Finland and number 41 in Sweden. "Good Vibes" with Swedish singer-songwriter Tove Styrke peaked at number 91 on Swedish Charts, despite not being released as a track from the project. On 4 June 2018, Tove Lo announced the remix of her song "Bitches" from her third studio album, Blue Lips. Aside from Alma, the song, also features Charli XCX, Icona Pop and Elliphant. The track was released on 7 June. In October 2018, Alma released a stand-alone track "Cowboy".

=== 2019: Stand-alone singles, EP and Bad News Baby ===
On 1 February, she released "When I Die" which was supposed to be a lead single from her debut studio album. Two weeks later, on 15 February, Alma released "Summer" a supposed second track from her debut album. "Lonely Night" was announced on 11 June and was later released on 15 June. Her third EP Have U Seen Her? (Part I) consisting of two tracks was released on 1 November. Both tracks were later included on Have U Seen Her?. An actual lead single from her debut album, Bad News Baby, was released on 22 November.

=== 2020: Have U Seen Her? ===
Have U Seen Her ? (Part II), the singer's fourth EP, was released on 13 March. The project has three tracks which were later included on an actual album. Her debut studio album, Have U Seen Her?, was released on 15 May.

=== 2022–2023: Time Machine ===
After a two-year hiatus, Alma started to tease a new single starting from 3 June 2022. She came back on 1 July 2022, with "Everything Beautiful" which serves as the lead track from her second studio album. "I Forgive Me" was released on 12 August 2022, as the second track from her second album. Alma dropped "Summer Really Hurt Us" on 23 September 2022, as the third track from her second album. "Hey Mom Hey Dad" was released on 20 January 2023, as the fourth track. Alma finally announced that her second studio album, Time Machine, will be released on 21 April 2023. "Tell Mama" was released as the fifth and final track from Time Machine. Later that year, Alma toured Europe to promote her second studio album.

=== 2024–present: Collaboration, documentary release ===
On 12 January 2024, Slowboy has released his collaboration with Alma and Digital Farm Animals called "Fake Friends". In March 2024, a documentary film called Life Must Be Beautiful was released in Finnish theaters. It was directed by Finnish actress and director Pamela Tola. A day before the documentary was released, Alma dropped a single with the same name.

== Personal life ==
In a March 2019 article in Gay Times, Alma confirmed she is a lesbian and in a relationship. Her partner is Finnish poet and civil rights activist Natalia Kallio.

== Discography ==
Studio albums

- Have U Seen Her? (2020)
- Time Machine (2023)

== Filmography ==
Year	Title	Role	Notes
2013	Idols	Herself; contestant	Season 7
2018	Yökylässä Maria Veitola	Herself	Season 3, Episode 9
2024	Life Must Be Beautiful	Herself	Documentary

== Tours ==
=== Headlining ===
- Minitour Europe (2016)
- E.U.R.O Tour (2018)
- Have U Seen Her Tour (2019)
- Europe Tour (2022)
- Time Machine Tour (2023)

=== Support ===
- MØ – Forever Neverland World Tour (2018)
- Christina Aguilera – The X Tour (2019)
- Tove Lo – Sunshine Kitty Tour (2020)
- Tove Lo - Dirt Femme Tour (2023)
- Coldplay - Music of the Spheres World Tour (2024)

== Awards and nominations ==
Award	Year (Note: Indicates the year of ceremony. Each year is linked to the article about the awards held that year, wherever possible.)	Nominee(s)	Category	Result	Ref.
Danish GAFFA Awards	2021	Herself	Best International Solo Act	Nominated	
Danish GAFFA Awards	2021	Have U Seen Her?	Best International Album	Nominated	
EBBA Awards	2018	Herself	European Border Breakers Award	Won	
Emma-gaala	2016	Herself	Export Emma of the Year	Won	
Emma-gaala	2016	Herself	Newcomer of the Year	Won	
Emma-gaala	2016	Herself	Artist of the Year	Nominated	
Emma-gaala	2016	Dye My Hair	Pop of the Year	Nominated	
Emma-gaala	2016	"Karma"	Song of the Year	Nominated	
Emma-gaala	2016	"Karma"	Music Video of the Year	Nominated	
Emma-gaala	2017	Herself	Export Emma of the Year	Won	
Emma-gaala	2017	"Chasing Highs"	Song of the Year	Won	
Emma-gaala	2018	Herself	Female Artist of the Year	Nominated	
Emma-gaala	2019	Have U Seen Her?	Pop of the Year	Nominated	
Emma-gaala	2023	Time Machine	Critics' Choice	Won	
Emma-gaala	2023	Time Machine	Album of the Year	Nominated	
Emma-gaala	2023	Herself	Artist of the Year	Nominated	
Emma-gaala	2023	Time Machine	Pop of the Year	Nominated	
MTV Europe Music Awards	2017	Herself	Best Finnish Act	Won	
MTV Europe Music Awards	2019	Herself	Best Finnish Act	Nominated	
Rober Awards Music Poll	2018	"Out of My Head" (with Charli XCX & Tove Lo)	Floorfiller of the Year	Nominated	
Satellite Awards	2019	"Don't Call Me Angel"	Best Original Song	Nominated	
Sound of...	2018	Herself	Sound of 2018	Nominated	
Sweden GAFFA Awards	2019	Herself	Best International Artist	Nominated	
WDM Radio Awards	2018	"All Stars"	Best Dancefloor Track	Nominated	
