= Felix Jaehn =

German DJ and record producer (born 1994)

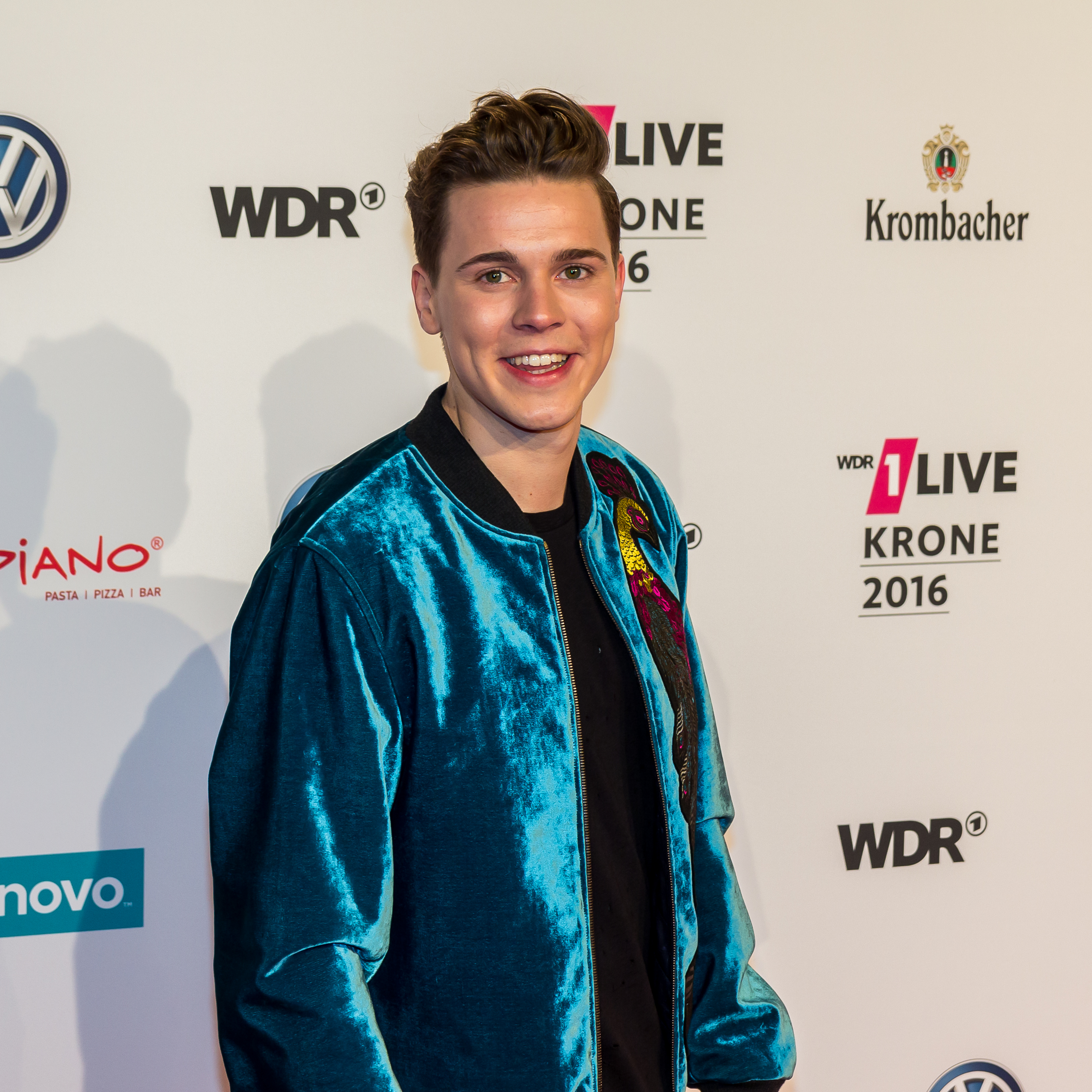
- Jaehn in 2016

Background information
- Born: Felix Kurt Jähn; 28 August 1994 (age 32); Hamburg, Germany
- Genres: EDM; tropical house; deep house; future house
- Occupations: DJ; record producer; remixer
- Years active: 2012–present
- Labels: Universal; Spinnin' Deep
- Website: felix-jaehn.com

Fee Jähn (born 28 August 1994 as Felix Kurt Jähn), known professionally as Felix Jaehn, is a German DJ and record producer. They (Note: Jaehn is non-binary and uses they/them pronouns.) achieved international success with their remix of OMI's song "Cheerleader", which topped the charts in multiple countries and reached number-one on the Billboard Hot 100 in 2015.

== Early life ==
Felix Kurt Jähn was born in Hamburg and raised in Schönberg, near Wismar in Mecklenburg-Vorpommern, Germany. Jaehn took violin lessons at the age of 5 and began their DJ career at 16. Jaehn lived in London for a year, where they attended Point Blank Music College at the age of 17. Afterwards, they briefly studied Business Administration at Humboldt-University in Berlin.

== Career ==
=== 2013–present ===
They began their career in the early 2010s. In August 2013, they released their debut single "Sommer am Meer". In November 2014, they released the single "Shine". In March 2015, they released the single "Dance with Me". In April 2015, they released a remix of Rufus and Chaka Khan classic "Ain't Nobody" retitled "Ain't Nobody (Loves Me Better)" featuring the vocals of Jasmine Thompson (based on an earlier charting version of the song by Thompson). The remix was an international pan-European hit topping the German Singles Chart. They are now signed to Universal Music. In July 2015, they released the single "Eagle Eyes". In 2017, they collaborated with Mike Williams for the single "Feel Good", released through Spinnin' Records.

They are best known for remixing Jamaican singer Omi's song "Cheerleader". The single was an international hit, topping the charts in Australia, Germany, Austria, Belgium (Flanders and Wallonia), Canada, Mexico, Denmark, France, Ireland, the Netherlands, Slovakia, Sweden, Switzerland, the United Kingdom, and the United States. It was also known as a popular wedding dance song in the United States.

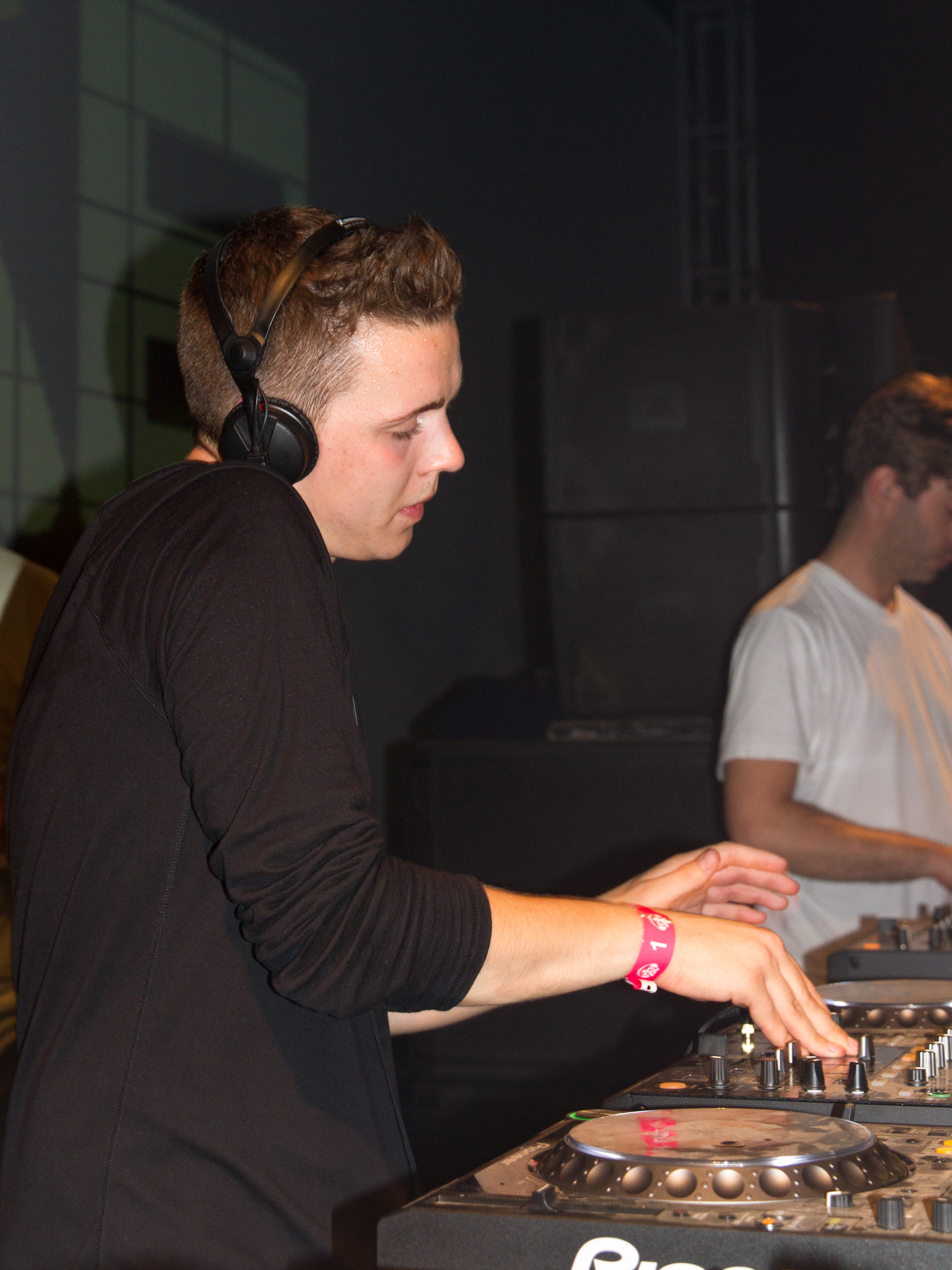
Jaehn in 2015

In 2018, NOTD and Jaehn released the single "So Close", with a music video that starred Sports Illustrated Swimsuit cover girl Camille Kostek. In February of the same year, they released their debut studio album, I. The album features guest vocals by Marc E. Bassy, Gucci Mane, Jasmine Thompson, Polina, Alma, and Herbert Grönemeyer.

=== Eff ===
In 2015, Jaehn launched Eff, a music duo project made up of German singer Mark Forster as vocalist and Jaehn as DJ and producer. The two met in an event in Vienna in 2015. Eff is a reference to Felix and Forster. Their first and only single as Eff was "Stimme" that has topped the German Singles Chart for three consecutive weeks, also charting in Austria and Switzerland.

== Personal life ==
Jaehn came out as bisexual in an interview for Die Zeit in February 2018, stating "sometimes I was more interested in girls, sometimes more interested in boys." In February 2021, Jaehn confirmed in an interview with radio station Energy that they had been in a relationship with a man since the summer of 2020 and that the two met via Tinder.

In 2024, Jaehn publicly spoke about being pansexual and non-binary. They prefer to be known as Fee Jaehn in their personal life, with "dey/denen" pronouns. However, they continue to perform and record music as Felix Jaehn.

== Discography ==
- I (2018)
- Breathe (2021)
- NAGTTB+ (2025)
