= Shy Martin =

Swedish singer and songwriter

shy martin
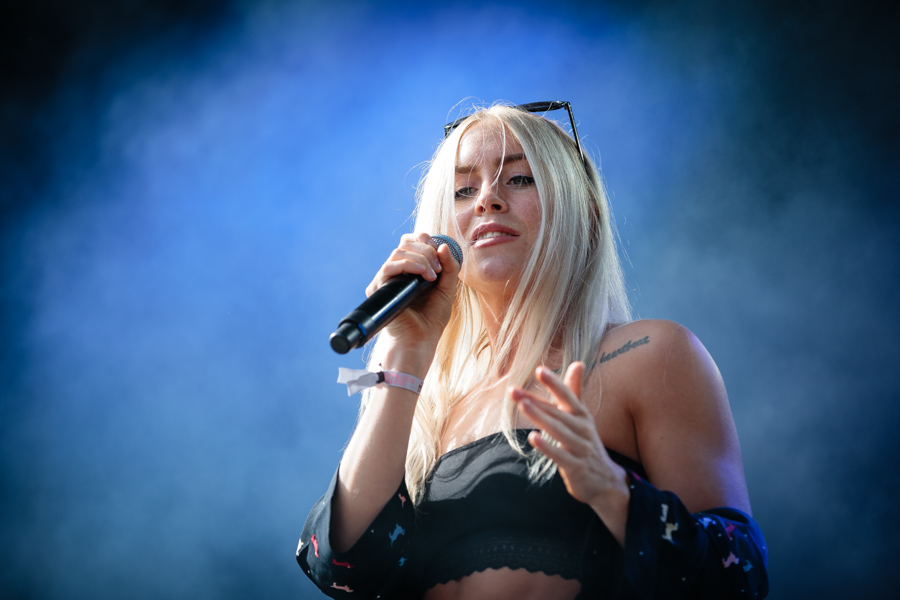

Background information
- Also known as: shy martin
- Born: Sara Hjellström; 5 November 1993 (age 32); Lerdala, Sweden
- Origin: Lerdala, Sweden
- Genres: Pop
- Occupations: Singer, songwriter
- Instruments: Vocals, guitar, piano
- Years active: 2016–present
- Label: shy recordings

Sara Hjellström (born 5 November 1993), known professionally as Shy Martin (stylized as shy martin) is a Swedish singer and songwriter. As a songwriter her compositions have been streamed over 3 billion times on Spotify alone, while her songs as lead vocalist have been streamed 1.5 billion times on the same platform.

In August 2020 shy released her Sad Songs EP, preceded by the singles "Slow" and "Are you happy?". The release was well received by blogs including The Line of Best Fit, Paste and Idolator, and has over 120 million+ combined streams on Spotify.

== Career ==
Raised in the small town of Lerdala, Sweden, shy martin first began writing songs and poetry in her youth as a means of self-expression. After winning a music contest at her school at age 17, shy signed with EMI for a period though ultimately she decided to go independent. She decided to start studying at the songwriting school Musikmakarna in Örnsköldsvik, in the north of Sweden. Shortly after she moved to Stockholm and signed to the independent label BLNK Music. As of November 2020 she is no longer signed with BLNK.

shy martin first established herself as a songwriter, a path that launched in dynamic fashion via her co-write and featured vocal on Mike Perry's "The Ocean (ft. SHY Martin)." Recording the vocals in one-take in her home wardrobe, shy wrote the track with longtime Swedish songwriting partner, SHY Nodi, with whom she has written several other songs for artists including The Chainsmokers, NOTD, Jess Glynne, Astrid S, Timeflies, Neiked and Kream. The track won Spotify Sweden's 'Most Streamed Song of the Year' with a groundbreaking 550 million+ streams (now 719 million+).

shy's career as an artist in her own right took off in 2017 with the release of 'Good Together', which was praised by The Line Of Best Fit as "part dancehall, part R&B, and completely addictive". Several more singles followed, receiving positive coverage from Billboard and others, culminating in the Overthinking EP in 2018. In April 2020, Martin released the single "can I call you back?". James Keith of Complex UK called the song "a dream-like flurry of breathy vocals, soul-touching songwriting and twinkling electronics." This was followed by the Sad Songs EP, her most successful collection to date.

shy's songwriting catalog has gone on to generate over 3 billion streams on Spotify alone including credits on "First Time" by Kygo ft. Ellie Goulding, "(Not) The One" by Bebe Rexha, "All We Know" by The Chainsmokers, "I Wanna Know" by NOTD (ft. Bea Miller), as well as songs for Jess Glynne, Astrid S, and ALMA, among others.

In addition to her artistry, shy is also a member of numerous music industry initiatives, most notably joining Spotify CEO/Founder Daniel Ek and songwriter/producer Max Martin's coveted 'Equalizer Project', a group aiming to combat gender inequality in the music industry. shy also participated in Bebe Rexha's 2018 'Women in Harmony' Dinner in Los Angeles, a gathering to empower female artists in music including Charli XCX, Kim Petras, and Avril Lavigne. She also performed alongside Matoma at the 2017 Nobel Peace Prize Concert.

In 2018 shy was awarded the Stikkan Anderson award for Songwriting.

shy released her new single 'wish I didn't know you' in October 2022, receiving positive reception from press with Clash Magazine declaring shy 'a genius...her voice has never been so beautiful'. In February 2023 shy martin released the title track from her debut album 'late night thoughts', being described as ' a departure from her previous work and can be seen as her boldest, most openly emotional, brave, and beautiful release to date'. martin is set to release her debut album in May 2023.

== Discography ==
=== Studio albums ===
Album
late night thoughts
Details
- Scheduled release: 19 May 2023
- Label: The Orchard
- Formats: Vinyl, CD, cassette, digital download, streaming

No.	Title	Length
1.	"wish I didn't know you"	2:53
2.	"late night thoughts"	2:25
3.	"glued to the floor"	2:18
4.	"grow old together"	2:13
5.	"wait it out"	2:33
6.	"don't let me forget you love me"	3:06
7.	"got me thinking"	3:43
Total length:		19:15

=== Extended plays ===
Album
Details
Track listing
Overthinking
- Released: 7 December 2018
- Label: BLNK Records
- Formats: Digital download

No.	Title	Writer(s)	Producer(s)	Length
1.	"Just a Little Longer"	Hjellström; Max Wolfgang; Freddy Alexander; Dehiro	Alexander; Dehiro	3:26
2.	"Good Together"	Hjellström; Lara Andersson; Marcus Andersson; Anton Göransson	Alexander; Göransson	3:25
3.	"Forget to Forget"	Hjellström; Hayley Aitken; Litens Anton; Elias Näslin	Alexander; Lias	2:35
4.	"Lose You Too"	Hjellström; Aitken; Anton; Näslin	Alexander	3:06
5.	"Bad in Common"	Hjellström; Aitken; Anton; Näslin	Alexander	2:59
6.	"Spaceship" (bonus track)	Hjellström; Aitken; Anton; Näslin	Alexander	2:55
Total length:				18:25

Sad Songs
- Released: 7 August 2020
- Label: BLNK
- Formats: Digital download

No.	Title	Length
1.	"Make us never happen"	2:51
2.	"Slow"	2:43
3.	"Can I call you back?"	2:33
4.	"Nobody likes moving on"	2:46
5.	"Are you happy?"	2:37
Total length:		13:32

=== Singles ===
==== As lead artist ====
Single	Year	Peak chart positions	Album
Single	Year	SWE	Album
"A Little Longer" (with Kiddo and Sid Rosco)	2017	—	Non-album single
"Good Together"	2017	79	Overthinking
"Bad in Common"	2018	— (Note: "Bad in Common" did not enter the Sverigetopplistan, but peaked at number one on the Swedish Heatseeker chart.)	Overthinking
"Forget to Forget"	2018	— (Note: "Forget to Forget" did not enter the Sverigetopplistan, but peaked at number 18 on the Swedish Heatseeker chart.)	Overthinking
"Lose You Too"	2018	—	Overthinking
"Just a Little Longer"	2018	—	Overthinking
"Out of My Hands"	2019	—	Non-album single
"Same Old"	2019	—	Non-album single
"Make Us Never Happen"	2019	— (Note: "Make Us Never Happen" did not enter the Swedish Singellista Chart, but peaked at number 12 on the Swedish Heatseeker Chart.)	Sad Songs
"Slow"	2020	—	Sad Songs
"Still the Same" (featuring Boy in Space)	2020	—	Non-album single
"Can I Call You Back?"	2020	—	Sad Songs
"Nobody Likes Moving On"	2020	—	Sad Songs
"Break with Me"	2021	—	Non-album single
"Remember You Were the One"	2021	—	Non-album single
"Feelings"	2021	—	Non-album single
"No Regrets" (with Nea)	2021	—	Non-album single
"wish I didn't know you"	2022	—	late night thoughts
"late night thoughts"	2023	—	late night thoughts

=== Songwriting credits ===
Title	Year	Artist	Album
"Taped Up Heart" (featuring Clara Mae)	2016	Kream	Non-album single
"All We Know" (featuring Phoebe Ryan)	2016	The Chainsmokers	Collage
"Parachute" (featuring Clara Mae)	2016	Galavant	Non-album single
"Summer Love"	2016	The Fooo Conspiracy	FO&O
"Sucker for You"	2017	Matt Terry	Trouble
"(Not) The One"	2017	Bebe Rexha	All Your Fault: Pt. 2
"Bloodstream"	2017	Astrid S	Party's Over
"First Time" (with Ellie Goulding)	2017	Kygo	Stargazing
"Different World" (featuring Sofia Carson, K-391, and Corsak)	2018	Alan Walker	Different World
"Million Reasons"	2018	Jess Glynne	Always In Between
"Used To" (featuring Lou Elliotte)	2018	Sandro Cavazza	Non-album single
"Old School Love" (featuring Nirob Islam)	2018	Neiked	Best of Hard Drive
"Fire"	2018	Timeflies	To Dream
"Know This Love" (featuring Litens)	2018	Kream	Non-album single
"I Wanna Know" (featuring Bea Miller)	2018	NOTD	Non-album single
"Good Vibes" (featuring Tove Styrke)	2018	Alma	Heavy Rules Mixtape
"Us"	2018	Julie Bergan	Turn On the Lights
"Broken Hearts" (featuring Hilda)	2019	Justin Caruso	Non-album single
"芽 (glow)" (featuring Hama)	2019	Corsak	Non-album single
"Trust Issues"	2019	Astrid S	Trust Issues
"First Time"	2020	Daya	The Difference
"When a Girl"	2020	Carys	To Anyone Like Me
"You (A La)"	2020	Sachi	Breakfast With Ella
"Long Run" (featuring Nina Nesbitt)	2020	Deacon	Non-album single
"I Love My Friends" (featuring Icona Pop)	2020	Steve Aoki	Neon Future IV
"Ever Really Know"	2020	Georgia Ku	Real
"Reminds Me of You" (featuring Moss Kena)	2021	Toby Romeo	Non-album single
"Domino" (featuring Foley)	2021	Pacific Heights	Non-album single
"Goodbye"	2021	Paige	Non-album single
"Coast" (featuring Cherrie)	2021	Sabina Ddumba	The Forgotten Ones
"Addicted to Her Sadness"	2021	Maro	Non-album single
"Ensam"	2021	Norlie & KKV	Non-album single
"Picking Flowers"	2021	Boy in Space	Frontyard
"Don't Call It Love"	2021	Samantha Harvey	Non-album single
"Teenage Chemistry"	2022	Nina Nesbitt	Älskar
"Pressure Makes Diamonds"	2022	Nina Nesbitt	Älskar
"Älskar"	2022	Nina Nesbitt	Älskar
"Barcelona Nights"	2022	Vicetone	Non-album single
"La Cita" (featuring Ally Brooke)	2022	Deorro	ORRO
"Know No Better" (featuring Call Me Loop)	2022	Cheat Codes	Hellraisers, Part 3
"Slow Lane" (featuring Lexie Carroll)	2023	Alfie Jukes	Little Omens
"Just Because"	2023	Sadie Jean	Simple Like 17
"Heroine"	2023	Ive	I've Ive
"Wish Upon a Star" (with Tiffany Day)	2024	Daniel Allan	Noise Pollution
"London Too"	2024	Haley Joelle	Crossing More Than City Lines
"Drugs"	2024	Jxdn	When the Music Stops
"Spiderman"	2024	Haley Bridge	Phonetic
"I Don't Wanna Dance"	2024	Charlotte Lawrence	Somewhere
"I Just Missed a Call" (with Hilda)	2025	NOTD	Digital Notes
"Towers" (with Frawley)	2025	Cheat Codes	Future Renaissance
"New"	2025	idntt	Unevermet
"Boytude"	2025	idntt	Unevermet
"ไฟเขียว (Greenlight)" (featuring Ink Waruntorn)	2025	BamBam	Hometown
"Wondering"	2025	BamBam	Hometown
"Limoncello"	2026	Chuu	XO, My Cyberlove
""Loving You!" (첫눈이 오면 그때 거기서 만나)	2026	Chuu	XO, My Cyberlove
"Delulu"	2026	KiiiKiii	Delulu Pack

== Awards and nominations ==
Year	Award	Category	Received for	Result
2016	Ted Gärdestad Awards	Scholarship	Södra Station	Winner
2016	Denniz Pop Award	Rookie Artist / Band	Södra Station	Nominee
2017	P3 Gold	Song of the year	The Ocean	Nominee
2017	P3 Gold	Pop of the year	Södra Station	Nominee
2017	Swedish Grammy Awards	Song of the Year	The Ocean	Nominee
2017	Denniz Pop Award	Grand Prize (International success)	SHY Martin & SHY Nodi	Winner
2017	Swedish Publishing Awards	Breakthrough of the Year	SHY Martin & SHY Nodi	Winner
2017	Swedish Publishing Awards	International Success of the Year	SHY Martin & SHY Nodi	Winner
2017	Swedish Publishing Awards	Most Streamed Song	The Ocean	Winner
2018	Swedish Publishing Awards	Song of the Year	I Wanna Know	Nominee
2019	International Songwriting Competition	Pop top 40	Forget to Forget	Winner
