= Maro =

Maro may refer to:

== People ==
- Virgil (Publius Vergilius Maro; 70 BC–19 BC), ancient Roman poet
- Maro (name), including a list of people with the given name or surname Maro
- Mark Rosewater (born 1967), American television writer and Magic: The Gathering designer
- K.Maro (born 1980), Lebanese-Canadian singer
- Maro (Lebanese singer) (born 2000), Lebanese singer-songwriter and YouTuber
- Maro (Portuguese singer) (born 1994), Portuguese singer

=== Fictional and mythological ===
- Maron (mythology), a companion of Dionysus and priest of Apollo in Greek mythology
- Maro, the Japanese name for Mallow (Super Mario RPG), a character from the video game Super Mario RPG

== Places ==
- Marø Cliffs, in Antarctica
- Maro Reef, in Hawaii
- Maro River, a river in Merauke Regency, Indonesia
- Maro, a village in Italy, part of the Castelnovo ne' Monti municipality
- Maro, Benin

== Other uses ==
- Maro (1816 ship), of 315 tons (bm), was a Nantucket whaler launched at Mattapoisett, Massachusetts, that made four whaling voyages to the Pacific before she was condemned at Rio de Janeiro on 20 December 1828.
- Maro (spider), a genus of spiders
- A Tahitian men's loincloth, now superseded by the pareo
