= Camille Kostek =

American model (born 1992)

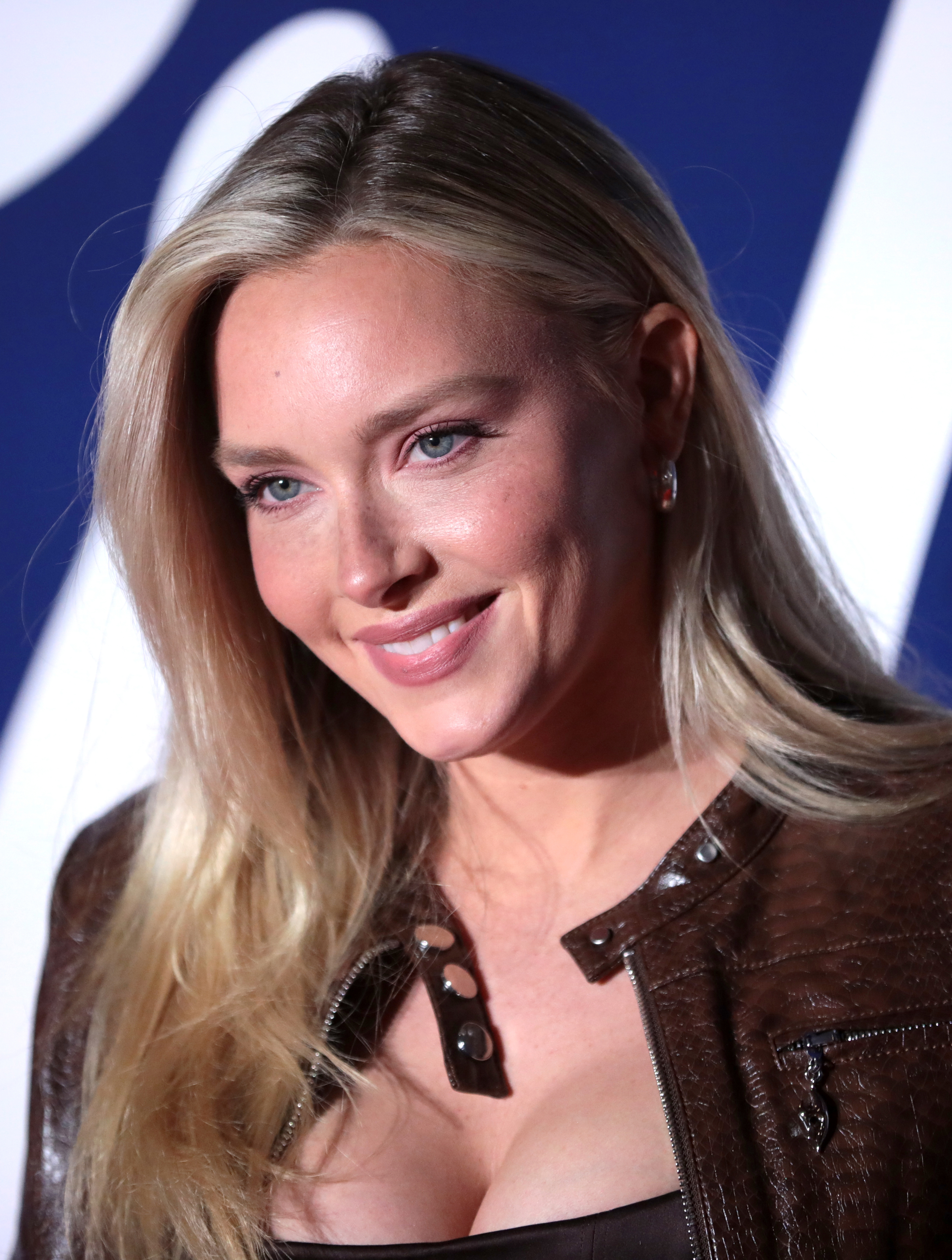
- Kostek in February 2023
- Born: Camille Veronica Kostek; February 19, 1992 (age 34); Killingworth, Connecticut, U.S.
- Education: Eastern Connecticut State University
- Occupations: Model; host; actress
- Years active: 2004–present
- Partner(s): Rob Gronkowski (2013–present)
- Modeling information
- Height: 5 ft 8 in (1.73 m)
- Hair color: Blonde
- Eye color: Blue-gray-green
- Agencies: Maggie (Boston); Select Model Management (Los Angeles); Elite Model Management (Miami); ONE Management (New York City)

Camille Veronica Kostek (born February 19, 1992) is an American model, host, and actress. She has appeared in the Sports Illustrated's Swimsuit Issue and was featured on the cover of the magazine's 2019 edition. Kostek has hosted television programs including Wipeout and Dancing with Myself, and appeared in the film Free Guy (2021).

== Early life and education ==
Kostek was born in Killingworth, Connecticut on February 19, 1992, to Alan, a general contractor, and Christina (née Decosta), a gym manager. She is the eldest of four siblings, and is of Polish, Irish and Jamaican descent. She started taking ballet lessons when she was three years old, and continued her training at Broadway Dance Center in New York City while competing nationally.

At Haddam-Killingworth High School in Higganum, Connecticut, Kostek was a cheerleader, lacrosse varsity captain, and host of her high school's broadcasting program. She studied communications with a minor in business at Eastern Connecticut State University, where she played lacrosse before joining its dance squad and working on its network show.

== Career ==
=== Professional cheerleading ===
External image
- Kostek's New England Patriots Cheerleaders Gallery

Kostek started her professional cheerleading career at age 19 with the Hartford Colonials of the United Football League. In 2013, while a junior at university, Kostek made it to the roster of the National Football League's New England Patriots Cheerleaders. Camille Kostek joined the New England Patriots Cheerleaders in 2013 and landed the cover of the team's annual swimsuit calendar, which was shot in Saint Lucia in 2013. She also joined the NFL Tour in China as the team's ambassador. Kostek was featured in advertising campaigns for Patriot Place and served as spokesperson for the cheer team. In her last game before retirement, she performed at the University of Phoenix Stadium in Arizona for Super Bowl XLIX where the Patriots beat the Seattle Seahawks on February 1, 2015.

=== Hosting ===
Kostek was a reporter for NESN's Dirty Water TV from 2016 to 2017 covering travel as well as sports events, including NASCAR. Since 2018, she has hosted and corresponded for South by Southwest, the Super Bowl, the National Hockey League, and Levitate Music Festival, as well as lifestyle, red carpet and sports events for Maxim and Sports Illustrated. She has also co-hosted radio shows on SiriusXM. Out of college, Kostek was offered a job on ESPN's Saturday Night Football, but turned it down for the opportunity to travel while modeling. In September 2020, she was announced as on-field host of game show Wipeout on TBS.

=== Modeling ===
Kostek began working as a model in 2013 and signed with a modeling agency in Boston in 2015. Her early work included commercial and print advertising, followed by appearances in fashion and lifestyle publications.

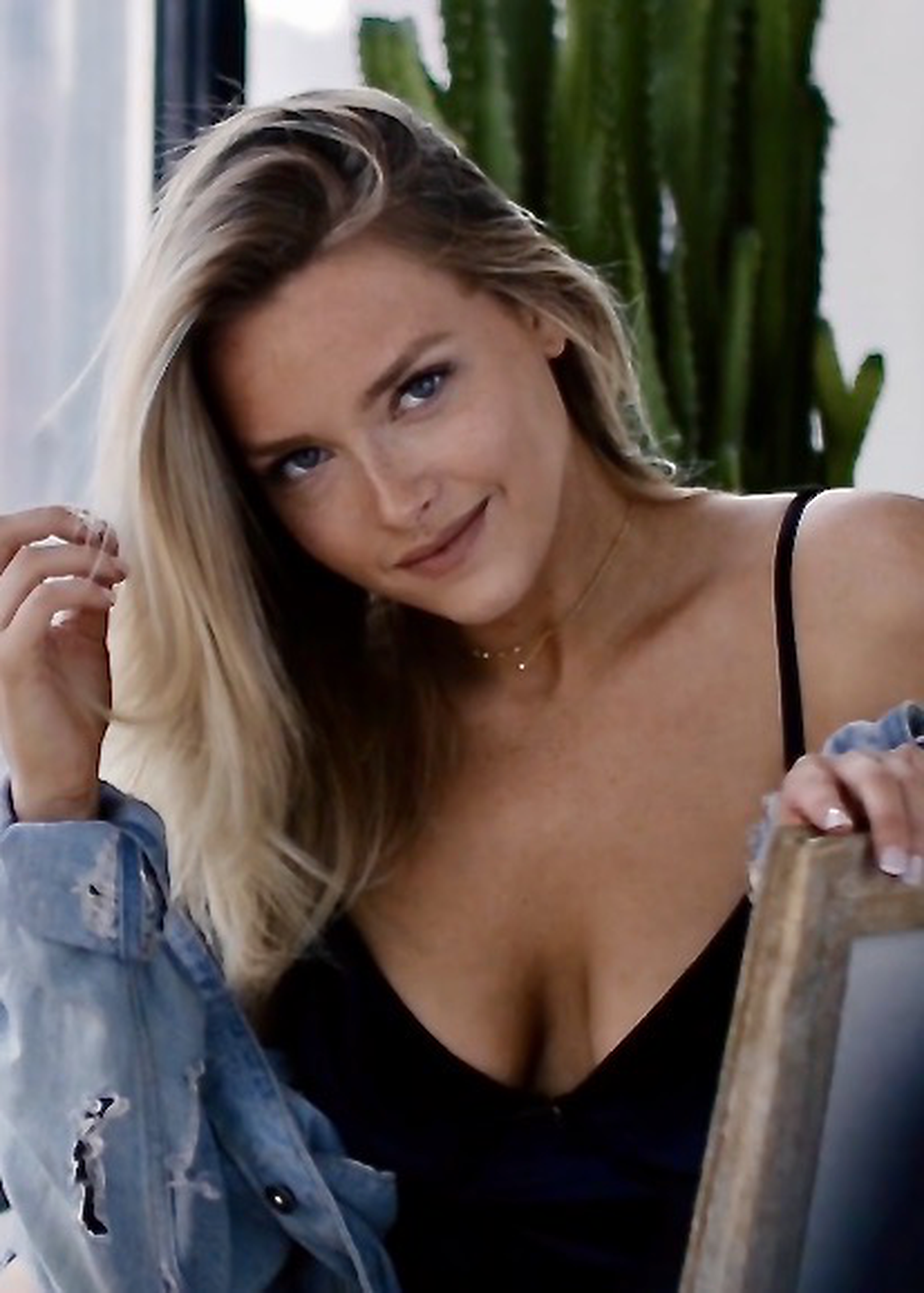
Kostek in July 2017

Kostek appeared in editorials for Elle, and on the covers of Ocean Drive, BELLA, Haute Living, The Improper Bostonian among others.

Kostek has done campaigns and ambassadorships for various clothing and cosmetic brands, including L'Oréal, Victoria's Secret, and Clarins. She also did ad campaigns for fashion line Kittenish, and walked the runway for its Spring/Summer 2019 collection at New York Fashion Week. Kostek is a longtime model and ambassador for Reebok, headlining the brand's PureMove Bra and Nano X1 campaigns.

External media

Images
- Kostek's Sports Illustrated Swimsuit Issue Cover in 2019

Video
- SI Swimsuit 2019: Cover Reveal

Kostek initially found difficulty securing modeling representation as agencies kept telling her she was not tall enough at 5'8", or thin enough at dress size 4/6. She submitted a video of her experience to the Sports Illustrated Swimsuit Issue which was conducting an open casting call. She was scouted, and walked the runway for the SI Swimsuit Fashion Show during Miami Beach Swim Week in July 2017. The following month, she was photographed by Yu Tsai in Belize for the 2018 issue. Kostek was chosen from 5,000 open casting call candidates and won the inaugural Sports Illustrated Swim Search in March 2018. She walked the runway for Miami Beach Swim Week for the second time in July 2018, and closed the show the following year. The first model announced for the 2019 issue, Kostek shot in South Australia with photographer Josie Clough, and landed a solo cover in her official year as a rookie. Kostek has been called an "American Bombshell" and sex symbol for her blonde hair, blue eyes and curves. Connecticut Magazine named her in their "40 under 40" list of influential people of 2018, and she was included in Maxim's Hot 100 list of Sexiest Women in the World in 2019.

=== Acting ===
Kostek made her film debut with a cameo appearance in STX Entertainment's 2018 comedy I Feel Pretty starring Amy Schumer. This was followed with a supporting role in 20th Century Studios's science fiction film Free Guy (2021) with Ryan Reynolds. She played Portia in the Tubi original film Classmates (2023).

=== Other ventures ===
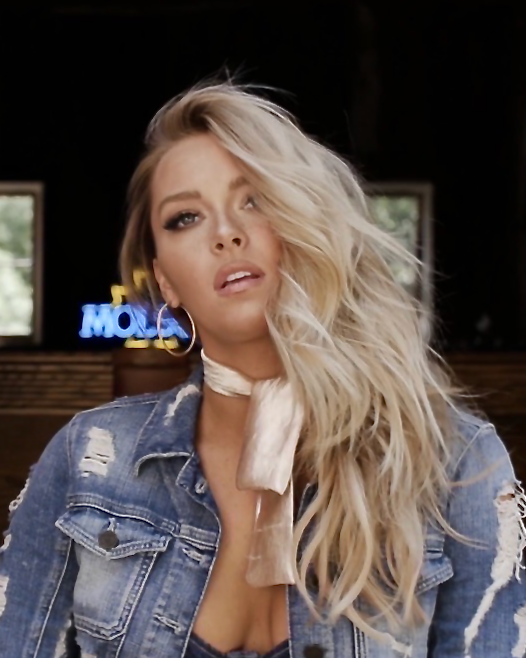
Kostek in September 2017

Since 2018, Kostek designs her namesake jewelry collections for Dune Jewelry. In 2020, she released a clothing and accessory collection inspired by her trademark phrase "Never Not Dancing" with Shine the Light On, proceeds of which benefit mental health charities. Her body-inclusive swimsuit and loungewear collection Swimsuits For All was released on May 3, 2021. Kostek toured U.S. universities and colleges in 2019 for her "Own It" Tour, where she gave talks on self-acceptance and body image.

== Personal life ==
Since 2013, Kostek has been in a relationship with American football player Rob Gronkowski. They live in Foxborough, Massachusetts, and Tampa, Florida.

== Filmography ==
=== Film ===
Year	Title	Role	Notes	Ref.
2018	I Feel Pretty	Hostess	Extra	
2021	Free Guy	Bombshell		
2023	Monsters of California	Meg		
2023	Classmates	Portia	Tubi original film	

=== Television ===
Year	Title	Role	Notes	Ref.
2018	Sports Illustrated Swim Search	Self / Winner		
2019	NHL Awards	Self / Presenter		
2019	Ridiculousness	Self		
2020	Fashionably Yours	Sam	Hallmark Channel television film	
2020	Kirby Jenner	Self	Episode: "A Jennerous Gift"	
2020	NHL Pause: Post to Post	Self / Host		
2021	Beat Shazam	Celebrity player	Episode: "Beat Shazam Celebrity Challenge!"	
2021	Entertainment Tonight	Self / Guest co-host	6 episodes	
2021	Love, for Real	Emily	Hallmark Channel television film	
2021–2025	Wipeout	On-field host	40 episodes	
2022	Is It Cake?	Judge	Episode: "Fake by the Ocean"	
2022	Dancing with Myself	Host	8 episodes	
2023	Ridiculousness	Self		

=== Music videos ===
Year	Title	Artist	Ref.
2014	"A Little More You"	Jack Fiskio	
2019	"So Close"	NOTD and Felix Jaehn feat. Captain Cuts and Georgia Ku	
2020	"I'll Wait"	Kygo	
2022	"Dancing Feet"	Kygo feat. DNCE	
