= Ann Liguori =

American sportscaster

- Born: Ann Liguori; 1961 (age 64–65); Cincinnati, Ohio, United States
- Education: University of South Florida
- Occupation: Sportscaster
- Website: annliguori.com

Ann Liguori is a nationally known sports radio and television personality, talk show host, journalist, author, and television producer in the world of sports media.

She was the first woman to host a call-in sports show on WFAN-New York, where she hosted a sports talk show for over 20 years and continues as the station's golf and tennis correspondent, covering events including The Masters, the U.S. Open, PGA Championships, US Open (tennis) and special competitions such as the Ryder Cup.

She is also a golf and tennis correspondent for CBS Sports Radio Network. She has covered six Olympics (both the Summer and Winter Games) in a variety of roles including talk show host, reporter and play-by-play commentator for the network radio rights holders including ABC Radio Sports, CBS Radio Sports and Westwood One Radio Network.

== Life and career ==
Born in Cincinnati, Ohio, Liguori spent most of her childhood in Brecksville, Ohio, a suburb of Cleveland, after her father accepted a position as Dean of Business Administration at Cuyahoga Community College and moved the family there when Ann was 6 years old. Liguori is a University of South Florida (USF) graduate. She serves on the USF Foundation Board and has established an endowed scholarship in the College of Arts & Sciences in memory of her late brother Jim. She also serves on the Women's Advisory Board of the Westhampton Beach Performing Arts Center, is on the board of the Metropolitan Golf Writers Association (MGWA), is an Advisory Board Member for Doonbeg Golf Club in western Ireland and has served on the board of trustees for the National Academy of TV Arts and Sciences, NY Chapter.

Liguori is president of Ann Liguori Productions and owns an extensive library of her own award-winning broadcast interviews with over 600 of the top legends in sports including Mickey Mantle, Ted Williams, Wilt Chamberlain, Sam Snead, Hank Aaron and Billie Jean King, to name a few.

She has the distinction of being the host, executive producer and the owner of "Sports Innerview with Ann Liguori," the longest-running cable sports show owned, hosted and produced by a woman. Liguori was also the first woman to host and produce her own weekly, prime-time series on The Golf Channel, "Conversations with Ann Liguori," where she interviewed top names in entertainment, music, sports and business while golfing with them. The series aired on TGC the first five years of the Channel's inception. Guests included an ‘A List’ of celebrities that Liguori booked for the show including Kevin Costner, Sylvester Stallone, Celine Dion, Vince Gill, Smokey Robinson, Joe Pesci, Matthew McConaughey, among others. The interviews focus on the celebrity's success stories and their passion for golf. She turned those interviews into her book, "A Passion for Golf, Celebrity Musings About the Game" which came out in a second printing in 2007. She currently writes a weekly column for CBS New York. Her weekly radio show, "Sports Innerview with Ann Liguori" airs each Saturday on NPR affiliate WLIW-FM. Her writing appears in The Huffington Post and Hamptons Magazine. In addition to her entrepreneurial and philanthropic work, Liguori is a media/marketing consultant for Independent Group Home Living (IGHL) and a corporate spokesperson and motivational speaker. Liguori is an Ambassador for Cross Golf USA. She has been a spokesperson and/or consulted for Bobby Jones Golf clubs, TaylorMade-Adidas and Izod Club. Ann Liguori Productions has worked with dozens of companies in the sponsorship arena including CIT, Platinum Maintenance, American Portfolios, Rolex, Tourism Ireland, Sharp Electronics, Volvo, Danskin, Lincoln Mercury, FedEx, Advil, McDonald's, Continental Airlines, Ashford Castle, Tralee Golf Club, Morgan Stanley, Kiawah Resort Development, Callaway Golf, Orlimar, Ping (golf), SuperShuttle, Desert Mountain Properties, Aer Lingus, Select SPDRs, SP Industries and Titanium Scaffold Services.

In 2008, Liguori founded the Ann Liguori Foundation to raise money for cancer prevention and cancer care. Each year, she hosts the Ann Liguori Foundation Charity Golf Classic which takes place in The Hamptons at a prestigious golf club. Monies raised continue to support a variety of not-for-profit organizations including KiDS NEED MORE, a camp on Shelter Island every August for young people with cancer and their siblings; American Cancer Society, St. Jude Children's Research Hospital, Els for Autism, Solid Rock Foundation, Play for Pink, East End Hospice, Southampton Hospital, Ovarian Cancer Research Fund and camps that teach nutrition for young people, just to name a few.

The tournament was held at the Maidstone Club three of the last four years, at Sebonack Golf Club in 2011 and at The Bridge in 2013. 2013 marked the 15th year for her charity golf classic.

In February 2018, Liguori collaborated with experiential jewelry company Dune Jewelry and launched the Hamptons Collection.

== Honors ==
In 2001, Liguori was the first woman in sports media honored with the Association for Women in Communications’ Headliner Award, previously given to Barbara Walters and Katharine Graham. In 2012, she was named one of the top women in sports media by the Los Angeles Daily News and that same year was honored with the Debbie Gibson Girls Humanitarian Award. Liguori was only the fourth female in the 52-year history of the Bob Hope Classic to play as a celebrity golfer when she played in the PGA Tour event in January 2011. She played with eventual Master's winner Bubba Watson on the second day of the tournament.

== Personal life ==
Liguori resides in Westhampton, New York and Orlando, Florida. She and her significant other, Scott Vallary, have a golden retriever named Skye.
