= Averi =

American rock band

- Origin: Boston, Massachusetts
- Genres: Rock
- Years active: 1998–2007
- Labels: Averi Music
- Members: Mike Golarz; Michael Currier; Stuart Berk; Chris Tilden; Matt Lydon
- Past members: Chad Perrone

Averi was an American rock band that formed in Boston in 1998. The primary lineup of the band was Chad Perrone (lead vocals), Michael Currier (saxophone and backing vocals), Stuart Berk (lead guitar), Chris Tilden (bass), and Matt Lydon (drums). Averi grew in local popularity rather quickly, and eventually developed a strong national following. From 2001 through 2005, the band garnered considerable attention from record labels.

In 2005, Perrone left the band to pursue a solo career. He was replaced by vocalist and guitarist Mike Golarz. The band continued to perform, and while Golarz's performance on new material was generally praised by the fanbase, he was seen as having a substantially different vocal style from Perrone, which impacted his ability to perform the group's older material. The band became inactive in 2007.

== History ==
Averi was founded in 1998 on the campus of Suffolk University by Matt Lydon, Michael Currier, and Chad Perrone. The band's debut EP, At Wits End, featured a saxophone-heavy funk sound. At Wits End became very popular within the local scene, and helped the band gain support from producer Mike Denneen for their debut studio album, Direction of Motion. Averi recruited Chris Tilden and Stuart Berk into the band for Direction of Motion, which had a more pop sound than At Wits End. After Direction of Motion sold thousands of copies, the band began touring throughout the East Coast of the United States. From 2003 to 2005, Averi would support artists such as Gavin DeGraw, Guster, Barenaked Ladies, Hanson, Matchbox Twenty, Backstreet Boys, and the Goo Goo Dolls in concert.

Averi's second album, Drawn To Revolving Doors, was released in 2005. The album had been recorded over the second half of 2004 and was produced by Scott Riebling. The sound of the record was more rock-influenced than Direction of Motion. Sold out shows up and down the east coast, including major markets like Boston and New York, followed the release of the album. The band continued to tour extensively after the release of Drawn to Revolving Doors.

In November 2005, it was abruptly announced that Perrone had decided to leave Averi; Perrone stated that he felt the band's growth outside of the Boston area had stagnated. The remaining members of Averi decided that they wanted to continue on with the band, and recruited Mike Golarz, another Boston-area musician who had previously performed in a band called Elcodrive. A few weeks following the announcement of the departure of Perrone, Golarz was named the new lead singer. Touring began again in early 2006, and many of the popular earlier tunes continued to be played, as well as new songs that the new line-up had been working on.

The band announced in the spring of 2006 a new record produced by Riebling. However, since that announcement, no further information on the album was released.

== Growth and press ==
Averi has been featured in newspapers and magazines such as the Boston Globe, Boston Herald, and The Improper Bostonian, as well as music websites like Alternative Addiction. In 2005 they received four Boston Music Award nominations (they ended up winning one for 'best local rock band') and were named Newbury Comics/Boston Phoenix's "Best Wicked Good Band".

== Band members ==
- Mike Golarz — lead vocals, guitar (2005-)
- Michael Currier — saxophone, vocals, tambourine
- Stuart Berk — lead guitar
- Chris Tilden — bass
- Matt Lydon — drums

== Past members ==
- Chad Perrone — lead vocals, guitar (1998–2005)

== Discography ==
- Drawn To Revolving Doors (2005)
- Averi Live @ The Avalon (2005)
- Averi Live @ The Paradise Rock Club (2003)
- Direction of Motion (2002)
- At Wits End (2000)

== Sources ==
- Boston Globe Articles, Reviews
- Boston Herald Articles, Reviews
