= Gunnar Söderström =

Bertil Gunnar Valter Söderström
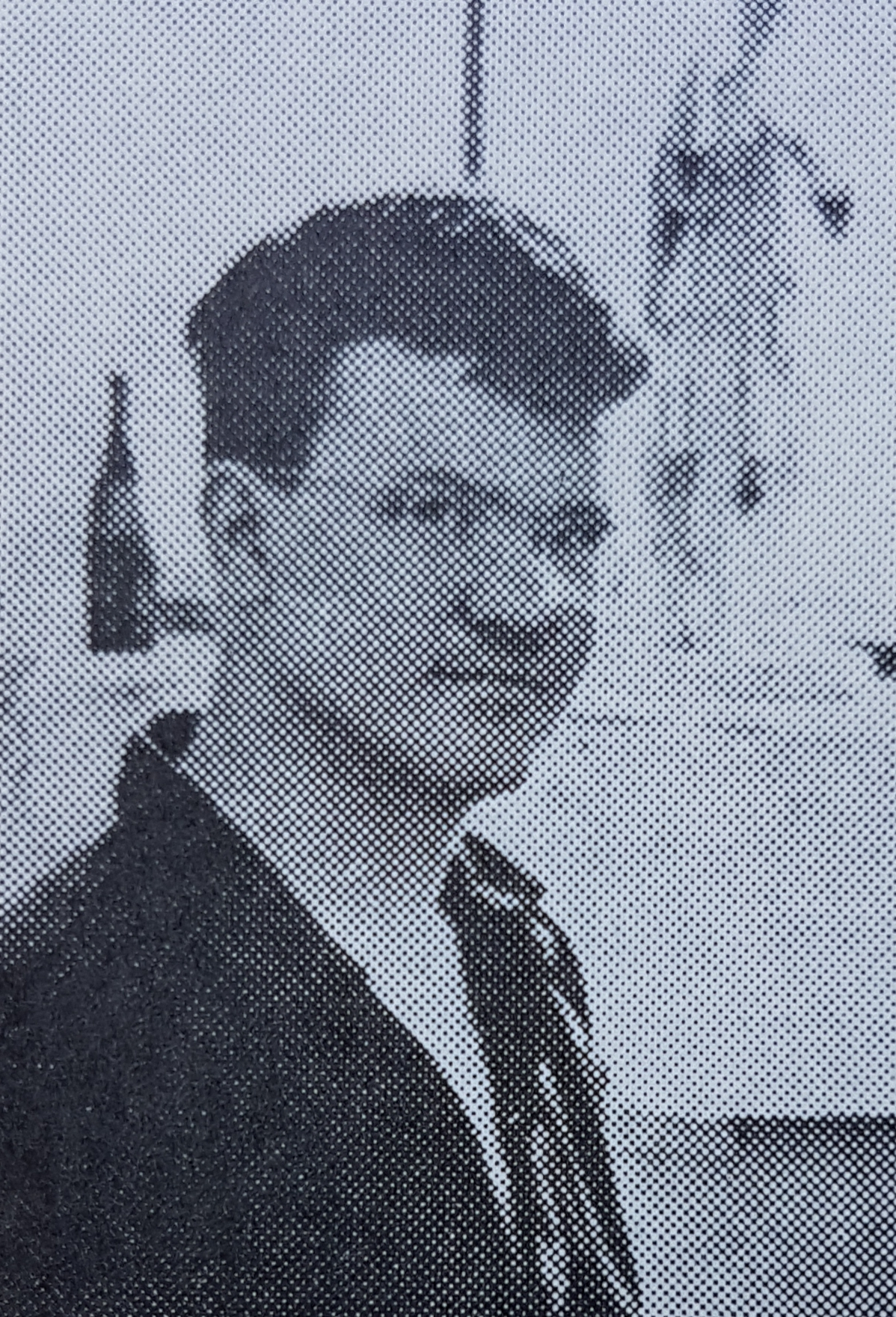
- Allhem's Swedish Artists Lexicon.
- Born: September 5, 1931; Lerdala, Skaraborg County, Sweden
- Died: October 20, 2023 (aged 92)
- Education: Konstfack University of Arts, Crafts and Design, Royal Institute of Art, Accademia di Belle Arti di Perugia
- Known for: Painter, draughtsman, sculptor, printmaker, theater decorator
- Spouse: Birgitta Lundberg-Söderström
- Awards: H Ax:son Johnson Foundation Scholarship, Frihet newspaper scholarship, H Ahlberg scholarship from the Art Academy

Bertil Gunnar Valter Söderström (5 September 1931 – 20 October 2023) was a Swedish painter, draughtsman, sculptor, printmaker, and theater decorator.

== Biography ==
Gunnar Söderström was born 5 September 1931 in Lerdala, Skaraborg County, Sweden. He studied decorative painting at the University College of Arts, Crafts and Design in Stockholm from 1952 to 1957 and at the Royal Institute of Art from 1957 to 1962, with a break in 1960 to study at the Accademia di Belle Arti di Perugia. He undertook several study trips in Europe to Spain, England, Norway, Italy, Germany, and multiple times to France. He held solo exhibitions in Stockholm, Mariestad, Töreboda, Huskvarna, De ungas salong in Stockholm, and Lilla konstsalongen in Malmö. Together with his wife and Steintor Sigurdsson, he exhibited at Galerie St Nikolaus in Stockholm in 1956, and together with his wife and Lars Hofsjö at Galleri Maneten in Gothenburg in 1959. He participated in the spring salons of the Swedish General Art Association, the youth biennial in Gorizia in Italy, and the Liljevalchs Stockholm Salons. In 1956, he won prize for his proposal for the decoration of the Stockholm Metro. He was employed at the Gothenburg City Theatre from 1959 to 1960, where he was responsible for the sets for George Bernard Shaw's Saint Joan, Jean-Baptiste Poquelin's The Misanthrope, and the costumes for Shakespeare's The Merchant of Venice. His early art consists of realistic landscape depictions with motifs from Gotland and Spain; he later engaged in experimental work with montages of cut-up tin cans, three-dimensional collages, various cylinder shapes, nude studies, as well as arts and crafts and book illustrations. Söderström is represented at the Moderna Museet, Kalmar konstmuseum and Västerås.

== Sources ==
- Svenskt konstnärslexikon part V, page 380, Allhems Förlag, Malmö.
