= Wipeout (2021 game show) =

American television game show (2021–2025)

- Genre: Sports; Comedy
- Directed by: J. Rupert Thompson; Rich Kim
- Presented by: John Cena; Nicole Byer; Camille Kostek
- Composer: Vanacore Music
- Country of origin: United States
- Original language: English
- No. of seasons: 2
- No. of episodes: 40

Production
- Executive producers: Matt Kunitz; Keith Geller; Sharon Levy; DJ Nurre; Shyam Balsé; John Cena
- Producers: Shawna Cabrera; Jefferson Nolan; Diana Le; Patrick O'Flaherty Jr.; Sara Van Acker
- Running time: 42 minutes
- Production companies: Endemol Shine North America; Lock and Key Productions; Pulse Creative; Hard Nocks South Productions

Original release
- Network: TBS
- Release: April 1, 2021 – December 9, 2025

Wipeout is an American television game show based on an obstacle course, hosted by John Cena, Nicole Byer, and Camille Kostek that aired on TBS from April 1, 2021, to December 9, 2025. It is a reboot of ABC's Wipeout which ran from 2008 to 2014. In February 2025, the series was cancelled after two seasons; the remaining episodes aired in November and December 2025.

== Production ==
In April 2020, it was announced that the original Wipeout series would be rebooted by TBS. In September 2020, John Cena, Nicole Byer, and Camille Kostek were announced as hosts of the show.

On February 11, 2021, it was announced that the series would premiere on April 1, 2021. The first episode also re-aired the following day on TBS's sister network, The CW. On May 19, 2021, it was announced that the reboot series was renewed for a second season.

On October 19, 2021, it was announced that new episodes of the first season would resume on January 11, 2022.

On October 5, 2023, it was announced that the second season would premiere on November 7, 2023. On February 3, 2025, it was announced that the series was cancelled after two seasons, with a few more episodes left to be aired. The remaining episodes of the series began airing on November 4, 2025.

== Michael Paredes controversy ==
On November 18, 2020, a controversy occurred when Wipeout contestant Michael Paredes became unconscious and went into cardiac arrest while competing in the show's obstacle course and then died the next day. Though Paredes' cause of death was determined to have been from a heart attack related to a natural artery blockage, his death occurred the day after he competed for the show, with Paredes even competing while having a case of acute pneumonia. It was also acknowledged that medical exams, including an EKG, were required for Wipeout contestants before they competed.

== Episodes ==
=== Series overview ===
Season	Episodes	Originally released	
Season	Episodes	First released	Last released
1	20	April 1, 2021	March 8, 2022
2	20	November 7, 2023	December 9, 2025

=== Season 1 (2021–22) ===
No. overall	No. in season	Title	Original release date	Prod. code	U.S. viewers (millions)
Part 1
1	1	"The Big Balls Are Back, Baby!"	April 1, 2021	101	1.06
2	2	"Big Ball Energy"	April 8, 2021	102	0.89
3	3	"OMFG Girl Run!"	April 15, 2021	103	0.86
4	4	"Love at First Trip"	April 22, 2021	104	0.82
5	5	"Invasion of the Big Balls"	April 29, 2021	105	0.75
6	6	"Tumble Sleep Eat Repeat"	May 6, 2021	106	0.69
7	7	"Wipe-pedia Vol.1"	May 13, 2021	107	0.65
8	8	"Get Ship Faced"	May 20, 2021	108	0.54
9	9	"Betting Battle"	May 27, 2021	109	0.76
10	10	"Now You Cena, Now You Don't"	June 3, 2021	110	0.70
Special
11	11	"The Suicide Squad Special"	August 1, 2021	112	0.40
Part 2
12	12	"Lights, Camera, Wipeout!"	January 11, 2022	111	0.68
13	13	"NOW That's What I Call Wipeout!"	January 18, 2022	113	0.65
14	14	"Nips, Flips 'n' Dips"	January 25, 2022	114	0.64
15	15	"Smooching Cena"	February 1, 2022	116	0.58
16	16	"Camille's "Sick" Day"	February 8, 2022	115	0.46
17	17	"Go! Fight! Kiss!"	February 15, 2022	117	0.43
18	18	"You Can't Small-SEE Me"	February 22, 2022	118	0.61
19	19	"Swole Daddy Issues"	March 1, 2022	119	0.50
20	20	"The Road to Redemption"	March 8, 2022	120	0.35

=== Season 2 (2023–25) ===
No. overall	No. in season	Title	Original release date	Prod. code	U.S. viewers (millions)
Part 1
21	1	"Big Ball Bromance"	November 7, 2023	201	0.45
22	2	"The Fast and the Furriest"	November 14, 2023	202	0.34
23	3	"Thou Shall Wipe Out"	November 21, 2023	203	0.39
24	4	"The Big Leballski"	November 28, 2023	204	0.38
25	5	"Fit for a Prince"	December 5, 2023	205	0.43
Part 2
26	6	"Jackie Chan Is Not in This One"	December 1, 2024	206	0.19
27	7	"Couples Game Night!"	December 8, 2024	207	0.31
28	8	"Battle of the Biggest Fans"	December 15, 2024	208	0.24
29	9	"All in a Day's Twerk"	December 22, 2024	209	0.24
30	10	"Business in Front, Wipeouts in Back"	December 29, 2024	210	0.26
31	11	"Princess Camille Is Here"	January 5, 2025	211	0.26
32	12	"John and Nicole's Excellent Adventure"	January 12, 2025	212	0.28
33	13	"Time to Drop the Hammock"	January 19, 2025	213	0.26
34	14	"Cheetahs Never Win"	January 26, 2025	214	N/A
Part 3
35	15	"Blowhards and Blowholes"	November 4, 2025	215	N/A
36	16	"The Wipeout Bunch"	November 11, 2025	216	N/A
37	17	"Cirque Du Wipeout"	November 18, 2025	217	N/A
38	18	"In Queso Emergency"	November 25, 2025	218	N/A
39	19	"Friends with Benefits"	December 2, 2025	219	N/A
40	20	"Redemption Again"	December 9, 2025	220	N/A

== Awards and nominations ==
Year	Award	Category	Result	Ref.
2022	Hollywood Critics Association TV Awards	Best Cable Reality Show or Competition Series	Nominated	

== International broadcast ==
The show also used to air in the United Kingdom on E4, Southeast Asia on AXN, Canada on CTV Comedy, Latin America on Warner Channel, the Netherlands on RTL7, and Spain on Boing. In India, it is also to be streamed on Lionsgate Play from 27 March 2026.
