= Been There Done That (NOTD song) =

2018 single by Swedish duo NOTD

Single by NOTD featuring Tove Styrke
- Released: 24 August 2018
- Length: 3:17
- Label: ToWonder; Universal
- Songwriter(s): Samuel Brandt; Tobias Danielsson; Jakob Hazell; Svante Halldin; Kennedi Lykken
- Producer(s): NOTD

NOTD singles chronology
"I Wanna Know" (2018)	"Been There Done That" (2018)	"So Close" (2018)

Tove Styrke singles chronology
"Stuck" (2018)	"Been There Done That" (2018)	"Talk to Me" (2018)

Music video
- "Been There Done That" on YouTube

"Been There Done That" is a song by the Swedish production duo NOTD, with vocals by the Swedish singer-songwriter Tove Styrke. It was released by ToWonder and Universal Music Group on 24 August 2018, through streaming and digital download formats. "Been There Done That" was produced by NOTD and written by them with the Swedish duo Jack & Coke and Kennedi Lykken.

== Formats and track listings ==
- Digital download
1. "Been There Done That" – 3:17
- Digital download – Remixes EP
1. "Been There Done That" (Rain or Shine remix) – 2:54
2. "Been There Done That" (Toby Green remix) – 2:34
3. "Been There Done That" (Beauz remix) – 2:48
4. "Been There Done That" (KVR remix) – 2:39
5. "Been There Done That" (Osrin remix) – 3:10
6. "Been There Done That" (Layte remix) – 3:07

== Charts ==
Chart (2018)	Peak position
Sweden (Sverigetopplistan)	69
