= So Close (NOTD and Felix Jaehn song) =

Single by NOTD and Felix Jaehn featuring Captain Cuts and Georgia Ku

from the album Breathe
- Released: 2 November 2018
- Length: 3:10
- Label: ToWonder; Universal
- Songwriters: Samuel Brandt; Tobias Danielsson; Felix Jaehn; Ben Berger; Ryan McMahon; Ryan Rabin; Georgia Overton
- Producers: NOTD; Jaehn; Captain Cuts

NOTD singles chronology
"Been There Done That" (2018)	"So Close" (2018)	"Start It Over" (2019)

Felix Jaehn singles chronology
"Masterpiece" (2018)	"So Close" (2018)	"All The Lies" (2019)

Music video
- "So Close" on YouTube

External videos
- Music Video featuring Camille Kostek

"So Close" is a song by Swedish production duo NOTD and German DJ Felix Jaehn featuring American production team Captain Cuts and vocals by English singer Georgia Ku, released as a single on 2 November 2018. It reached the top 50 in Australia, New Zealand and Germany before reaching number one on both the US Billboard Dance Club Songs and Dance/Mix Show Airplay charts in its 2 March 2019 issue.

It gained further attention for its music video starring Sports Illustrated Swimsuit cover girl Camille Kostek.

== Music video ==
The first music video, released in December 2018, features a man and woman who meet on a work commute and fall in love.

A second music video, released in June 2019, features Sports Illustrated Swimsuit Issue cover girl Camille Kostek.

== Charts ==
=== Weekly charts ===
Chart (2018–2020)	Peak position
Australia (ARIA)	45
Austria (Ö3 Austria Top 40)	43
Czech Republic Airplay (ČNS IFPI)	85
Germany (GfK)	45
Germany Dance (Official German Charts)	9
Netherlands (Single Top 100)	97
Netherlands (Dutch Dance Top 30)	19
New Zealand (Recorded Music NZ)	31
Slovakia Airplay (ČNS IFPI)	19
Sweden (Sverigetopplistan)	77
UK Dance (OCC)	20
US Dance Club Songs (Billboard)	1
US Hot Dance/Electronic Songs (Billboard)	10
US Pop Airplay (Billboard)	30

=== Year-end charts ===
Chart (2019)	Position
US Dance Club Songs (Billboard)	15
US Hot Dance/Electronic Songs (Billboard)	24

== Certifications ==
Region	Certification	Certified units/sales
Australia (ARIA)	2× Platinum	140,000^{‡}
Brazil (Pro-Música Brasil)	Gold	20,000^{‡}
Canada (Music Canada)	Gold	40,000^{‡}
Germany (BVMI)	Gold	200,000^{‡}
New Zealand (RMNZ)	2× Platinum	60,000^{‡}
United Kingdom (BPI)	Silver	200,000^{‡}
United States (RIAA)	Platinum	1,000,000^{‡}
^{‡} Sales+streaming figures based on certification alone.

== See also ==
- List of Billboard number-one dance songs of 2019
