= Stuck (Lost Kings song) =

2018 single by American duo Lost Kings

Single by Lost Kings featuring Tove Styrke

from the EP Paper Crowns
- Released: July 19, 2018
- Length: 3:12
- Label: Disruptior; RCA
- Songwriters: Caroline Pennell; Mick Coogan; Nicki Adamsson; Norris Shanholtz; Robert Abisi
- Producers: Lost Kings; Nicki Adamsson

Lost Kings singles chronology
"Drunk As Hell" (2018)	"Stuck" (2018)	"Don't Kill My High" (2018)

Tove Styrke singles chronology
"Sway" (2018)	"Stuck" (2018)	"Been There Done That" (2018)

"Stuck" is a song by American DJ duo Lost Kings from their third extended play (EP) Paper Crowns (2019). It features vocals from Swedish singer Tove Styrke. The song was written by Caroline Pennell, Mick Coogan, Nicki Adamsson, Norris Shanholtz, and Robert Abisi, and produced by Lost Kings and Adamsson. "Stuck" was released as a single on July 19, 2018, through Disruptor and RCA.

== Chart performance ==
In Sweden, "Stuck" debuted at number 56 on the Sverigetopplistan singles chart on July 27, 2018, which became its peak position. The song spent a total of two weeks on the chart.

== Music video ==
The music video for "Stuck" was directed by Tyler Bailey.

== Track listing ==
- Digital single
1. "Stuck" – 3:12
- Remix single
1. "Stuck" (Kuur x Kbubs x DCB remix) – 3:44
2. "Stuck" (Gil Glaze remix) – 3:07
3. "Stuck" (Julius C remix) – 3:12

== Credits and personnel ==
Credits are adapted from Tidal.

- Caroline Pennell – songwriting
- Mick Coogan – songwriting
- Nicki Adamsson – songwriting, production
- Norris Shanholtz – songwriting, recording
- Robert Abisi – songwriting
- Lost Kings – production
- Tove Styrke – vocals
- Mitch McCarthy – mixing
- Tatsuya Sato – mastering

== Charts ==
Chart performance for "Stuck"
Chart (2018)	Peak position
Sweden (Sverigetopplistan)	58

== Release history ==
Release dates and formats for "Stuck"
Country	Date	Format(s)	Version	Label	Ref.
Various	July 19, 2018	Digital download; streaming	Original	Disruptior; RCA	
Various	August 31, 2018	Digital download; streaming	Remixes	Disruptior; RCA	
