= I Wanna Know (NOTD song) =

2018 single by NOTD

Single by NOTD featuring Bea Miller
- Released: 16 March 2018
- Length: 3:17
- Label: ToWonder; Universal
- Songwriters: Samuel Brandt; Tobias Danielsson; Sara Hjellström; Nirob Islam; Jason Gill
- Producer: NOTD

NOTD singles chronology
"Summer of Love" (2017)	"I Wanna Know" (2018)	"Been There Done That" (2018)

Bea Miller singles chronology
"S.L.U.T." (2017)	"I Wanna Know" (2018)	"Waste of Time" (2018)

Music video
- "I Wanna Know" on YouTube

"I Wanna Know" is a song by Swedish production duo NOTD, featuring vocals of American singer-songwriter Bea Miller. The song was released by ToWonder and Universal Music Group on 16 March 2018, through streaming and digital download formats. "I Wanna Know" was produced by the duo, and written by them alongside Shy Martin, Shy Nodi, and Jason Gill. The music video for the track was released on 14 May 2019, and was directed by Michael Baldwin, and produced by Jack Lightfoot.

== Formats and track listings ==
- Digital download
1. "I Wanna Know" – 3:17
- Digital download – Acoustic
1. "I Wanna Know" (Acoustic) – 3:20
- Digital download – Remixes EP
1. "I Wanna Know" (Syn Cole remix) – 2:59
2. "I Wanna Know" (Pusher remix) – 3:24

== Charts ==
=== Weekly charts ===
Weekly chart performance for "I Wanna Know"
Chart (2018–2019)	Peak position
Australia (ARIA)	18
Belgium (Ultratop 50 Wallonia)	14
Canada Hot 100 (Billboard)	69
Denmark (Tracklisten)	40
Norway (VG-lista)	18
Sweden (Sverigetopplistan)	28
UK Singles (OCC)	46
US Dance Club Songs (Billboard)	6
US Bubbling Under Hot 100 (Billboard)	23

=== Year-end charts ===
Year-end chart performance for "I Wanna Know"
Chart (2018)	Position
Australia (ARIA)	92
Sweden (Sverigetopplistan)	97

== Certifications ==
Certifications for "I Wanna Know"
Region	Certification	Certified units/sales
Australia (ARIA)	4× Platinum	280,000^{‡}
Brazil (Pro-Música Brasil)	Platinum	40,000^{‡}
Canada (Music Canada)	2× Platinum	160,000^{‡}
Denmark (IFPI Danmark)	Gold	45,000^{‡}
New Zealand (RMNZ)	Platinum	30,000^{‡}
United Kingdom (BPI)	Gold	400,000^{‡}
United States (RIAA)	Platinum	1,000,000^{‡}
Streaming
Sweden (GLF)	Platinum	8,000,000^{†}
^{‡} Sales+streaming figures based on certification alone.^{†} Streaming-only figures based on certification alone.
