= Johanna Frändén =

Swedish sports journalist

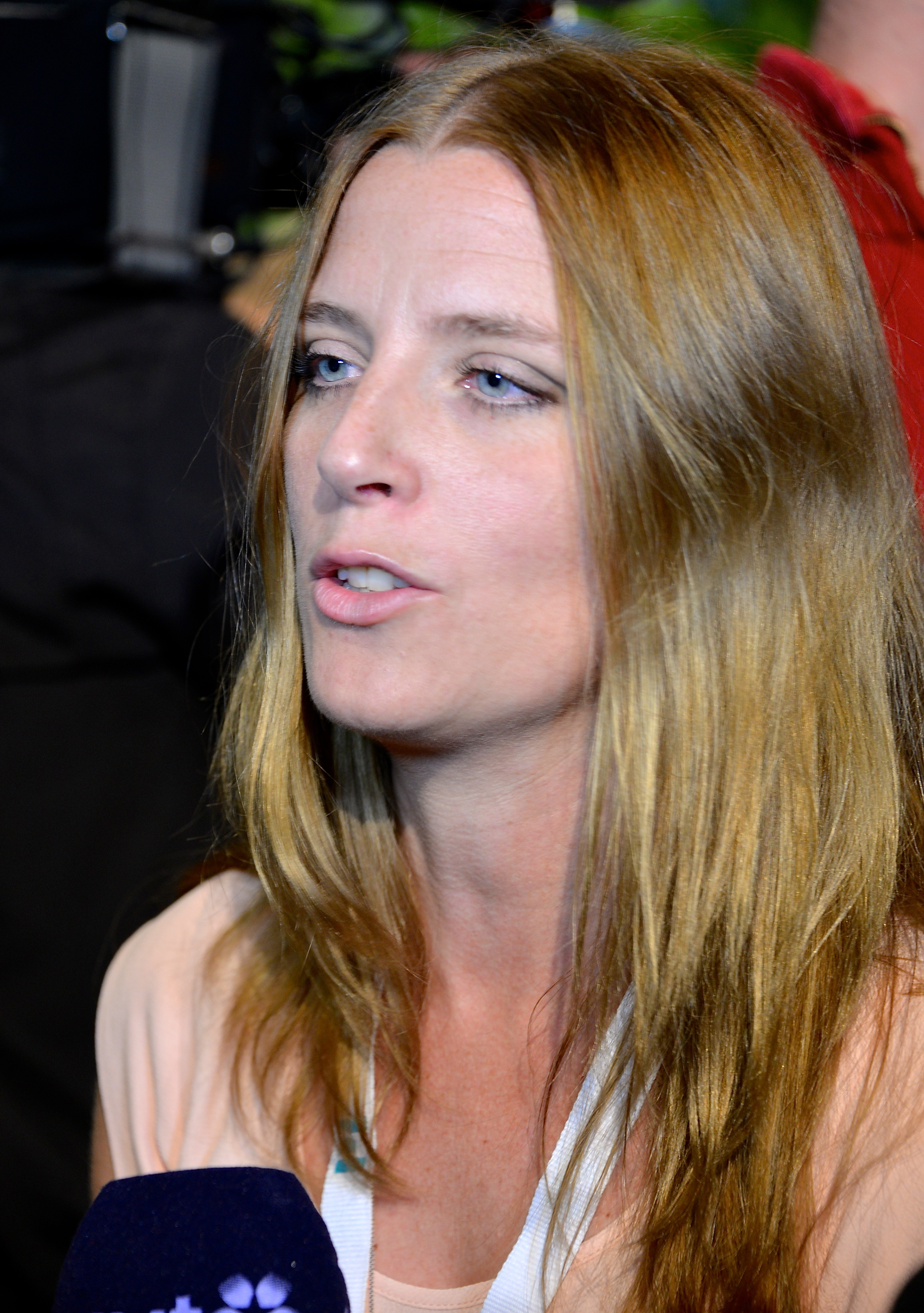
- Johanna Frändén (2013)
- Born: 31 August 1981 (age 44); Lerdala, Sweden
- Occupation: Sports journalist

Johanna Frändén (born 31 August 1981) is a Swedish sport journalist particularly specializing in association football who files reports from the European football leagues for the sport section of the Aftonbladet newspaper and for Sveriges Television (SVT). She had the special task of following Zlatan Ibrahimović's career for the media.

== Career ==
=== Early life ===
Frändén was born on 31 August 1981 in Lerdala near Skövde. She studied Spanish during her high school years. During 2005, she got in contact with Aftonbladet sports editor Simon Bank, which led to her moving to Stockholm in 2006 to do some work for the newspaper's sports section.

=== Work ===
During the summer of 2006, Frändén was dispatched to France by Aftonbladet to cover the aftermath of the 2006 FIFA World Cup. She also had the special task of following Zlatan Ibrahimović's career for SVT. She relocated to Barcelona when Ibrahimović started playing for FC Barcelona, and moved to Paris when he started playing in the French Ligue 1 club Paris SG.

Starting in 2010, Frändén was invited as a studio expert in SVT's coverage of the FIFA World Cup and UEFA Euro tournaments. She covered the 2010 World Cup and the 2014 World Cup, and the European Football Championships, most notably Euro 2012 and Euro 2016.

In 2011, Frändén participated in the SVT game show På spåret in a team with Carl Johan De Geer. The following year she won the SvenskaFans.com's "Guldskölden" (The golden shield) award as Sweden's best Twitter poster for sports. In May 2013, she won the "Frilanspriset" (The freelance award) of the Poppius journalist school.
