= Maro (name) =

Maro is a name used as both a given name and surname, masculine and feminine, in different cultures. Notable people with the name include:

== Given name ==
- Publius Vergilius Maro, a Roman poet
- Maron (died 410), a Syriac Christian saint, founder of what is now known as the Maronite Church
- Maro Ajemian (1921–1978), an Armenian-American pianist
- Maro Kontou (born 1934), a Greek actress and politician
- Maro Douka (born 1947), a Greek novelist
- Maro Litra (born 1970), a Canadian-Greek singer
- Maro Balić (born 1971), a Croatian water polo player
- Maro Sargsyan (born 1973), an Armenian artist
- Maro Engel (born 1985), a German racing driver
- Maro Joković (born 1987), a Croatian water polo player
- Maro Itoje (born 1994), an English rugby union player
- Maro Makashvili (born 1901), a Georgian army nurse and awarded national hero

== Surname ==
- Virgil (Publius Vergilius Maro; 70 BC–19 BC), an ancient Roman poet
- Akaji Maro (born 1943), a Japanese actor, dancer, and theater director
- Judith Maro (1919–2011), a Ukrainian-born Welsh-language writer
- Marlon Maro (born 1965), a Filipino footballer and coach

== See also ==
- Maro (disambiguation)
