= NOTD =

Swedish production duo

- Genres: Pop; melodic house; bass house; future bass
- Years active: 2017–present
- Label: Universal Music Group
- Members: Samuel Brandt (Severo); Tobias Danielsson (ToWonder)

NOTD (pronounced "noted") is a Swedish musical production duo composed of Tobias Danielsson and Samuel Brandt. They are best known for their songs "I Wanna Know" featuring Bea Miller and "So Close" with Felix Jaehn featuring Captain Cuts and Georgia Ku.

== Background ==
The duo met on SoundCloud and began creating remixes together before they found out they would be attending the same high school. The duo chose the name NOTD by combining the last two letters of each of their last names and reversing them.

Their remix of "Scars to Your Beautiful" by Alessia Cara was released in 2016. A remix of "Dark Side" by Phoebe Ryan was released in 2017. Their remix of STANAJ's "Romantic", which peaked at #91 in Australia (as "The Preview EP") was released on 27 January 2017. Their remix of "There's Nothing Holdin' Me Back" by Shawn Mendes was released in May 2017. Their remix of "Shape of You" by Ed Sheeran received a nomination for an Electronic Music Award for Remix of the Year. Also in 2017, they released a remix of "Wild Thoughts" by DJ Khaled and Rihanna, which appeared on Billboard's list of the best remixes of the song. They released their debut single "Summer of Love" which features Norwegian singer Dagny on 11 August 2017. In December 2017, they released a remix of "Tell Me You Love Me" by Demi Lovato. They also produced a remix of Years & Years' song "If You're Over Me".

Their second single "I Wanna Know" featuring Bea Miller was released in March 2018. The song charted in several countries, including Australia, Canada, and Sweden. Their single "Been There Done That" with Tove Styrke was released in August.

The duo and Felix Jaehn released the single "So Close", with a music video starring Sports Illustrated Swimsuit cover girl Camille Kostek. The song reached #1 on Billboard's Dance Club Play chart.

NOTD also reached #1 on Billboard's Dance/Mix Show Airplay chart in 2021 for three weeks with "Nobody" (featuring Catello)".

== Discography ==
=== Extended plays ===
List of extended plays
Title	Details
Digital Notes	Released: March 14, 2025; Labels: EMI Sweden, Universal; Formats: Digital download, streaming

=== Singles ===
List of singles
Title	Year	Peak chart positions									Certifications	Album
Title	Year	SWE	AUS	BEL (WA) Tip	CAN	DEN	NOR	UK	US Bub.	US Dance	Certifications	Album
"Summer of Love" (featuring Dagny)	2017	—	—	—	—	—	—	—	—	—		Non-album singles
"I Wanna Know" (featuring Bea Miller)	2018	28	18	14	69	40	18	46	23	6	GLF: Platinum; ARIA: 4× Platinum; BPI: Gold; IFPI DEN: Gold; MC: 2× Platinum; RIAA: Platinum	Non-album singles
"Been There Done That" (featuring Tove Styrke)	2018	69	—	—	—	—	—	—	—	—		Non-album singles
"So Close" (with Felix Jaehn featuring Captain Cuts and Georgia Ku)	2018	77	45	—	—	—	—	—	—	1	ARIA: 2× Platinum; BPI: Silver; MC: Gold; RIAA: Platinum	Breathe
"Start It Over" (featuring CVBZ and Shy Martin)	2018	—	—	—	—	—	—	—	—	—		Non-album single
"I Miss Myself" (with Hrvy)	2019	83	—	—	—	—	—	—	—	—		Can Anybody Hear Me?
"Keep You Mine" (with Shy Martin)	2019	45	—	—	—	—	—	—	—	—		Non-album singles
"Wanted" (with Daya)	2019	—	—	—	—	—	—	—	—	17		Non-album singles
"I Don't Know Why" (with Astrid S)	2020	91	—	—	—	—	16	—	—	—		Leave It Beautiful (Complete)
"Cry Dancing" (with Nina Nesbitt)	2020	—	—	—	—	—	—	—	—	—		Non-album singles
"Therapy" (with Boy in Space)	2020	—	—	—	—	—	—	—	—	—		Non-album singles
"Nobody" (with Catello)	2020	—	—	—	—	—	—	—	—	—		Non-album singles
"Malibu" (with Virginia to Vegas)	2021	—	—	—	—	—	—	—	—	—		Remember That Time We
"Keep You Mine" (with BEAUZ)	2022	_	_	_	_	_	_	_	_	_		
"Worst Thing" (with kenzie)	2022	—	—	—	—	—	—	—	—	—		Non-album singles
"AM:PM" (with Maia Wright)	2023	— (Note: "AM:PM" did not enter the Swedish Singellista Chart, but peaked at number one on the Swedish Heatseeker Chart.)	—	—	—	—	—	—	—	—		Non-album singles
"Occhi d'amore" (with Veronica Maggio)	2023	7	—	—	—	—	—	—	—	—	GLF: Platinum	Non-album singles
"Nostalgia" (with Georgia Ku)	2024	—	—	—	—	—	—	—	—	—		Non-album singles
"Under My Breath" (with Riley Biederer)	2024	—	—	—	—	—	—	—	—	—		Non-album singles
"Chocolate" (with Jubël)	2024	—	—	—	—	—	—	—	—	—		Non-album singles
"Panic" (with Corbyn Besson)	2024	—	—	—	—	—	—	—	—	—		Non-album singles
"Lover Online" (with Maia Wright)	2024	—	—	—	—	—	—	—	—	—		Digital Notes
"Bruce Wayne" (with Inji)	2024	—	—	—	—	—	—	—	—	—		Digital Notes
"Another Life" (with Oaks)	2025	—	—	—	—	—	—	—	—	—		Digital Notes
"Here 4 U"	2025	—	—	—	—	—	—	—	—	—		Non-album single
"Found Your Love" (with Libby Whitehouse)	2026	—	—	—	—	—	—	—	—	—		Non-album single
"—" denotes a recording that did not chart.

== Awards and nominations ==
Year	Award	Category	Work	Result
2017	Electronic Music Awards	Remix of the Year	Ed Sheeran - "Shape of You (NOTD Remix)"	Nominated

Year	Award	Category	Work	Result
2020	iHeart Radio Music Awards	Dance Song of the Year	NOTD & Felix Jaehn – "So Close" (ft. Georgia Ku & Captain Cuts)	Nominated
