= Dancing with Myself (TV series) =

American dance competition television series

- Genre: Reality competition
- Presented by: Camille Kostek
- Judges: Shakira; Liza Koshy; Nick Jonas
- Opening theme: Dancing With Myself by Gen X
- Country of origin: United States
- Original language: English
- No. of seasons: 1
- No. of episodes: 8

Production
- Executive producers: Shakira; John Irwin; Dave Kuba; Eli Frankel; Ben Thursby-Palmer; Jaime Levine; Tina Nicotera Bachman
- Production companies: Irwin Entertainment; Shakira; Universal Television Alternative Studio

Original release
- Network: NBC
- Release: May 31 – July 19, 2022

Dancing with Myself is an American dance competition television series that aired on NBC from May 31 to July 19, 2022. The series was hosted by Camille Kostek.

== Production ==
On December 14, 2021, it was announced that NBC had ordered the series with Shakira as the star and executive producer. On March 15, 2022, it was announced that Camille Kostek would host the series and that Shaquille O'Neal and Liza Koshy would join Shakira as creators of the series. On March 15, 2022, O'Neal was replaced by Nick Jonas due to technical difficulties.

The series premiered on May 31, 2022, and it was cancelled after a single season in March 2023.

== Format ==
Shakira, Koshy, and Jonas are described as "creators" rather than "judges" or "coaches."

Each show features 12 contestants competing for a $25,000 prize. Each episode features six rounds of competition; in each round, all contestants dance to the same song. The rounds are:

1. All Eyes On You: One creator demonstrates a series of dance moves. Each contestant must then perform those moves solo. The top eight vote-getters automatically advance, while creators save two of the remaining contestants.
2. Freestyle Battle Round: The remaining 10 contestants compete, in pairs of two, in a freestyle battle. The audience chooses a winner from each battle; the creators save three of the losing contestants.
3. The Dance Along: The eight contestants are divided into two groups of four, and must perform choreography presented by a special celebrity guest. The audience chooses one group to move on; the creators save two contestants from the losing group.
4. Duo Collabs: The six remaining dancers are split into three pairs and work together to perform a dance incorporating moves presented by the creators. The audience selects one pair to advance, while the creators can save any two contestants from the losing pairs.
5. The Shake-Up: The four remaining contestants all dance at the same time as they're faced with a different twist ("Shake-Up") each episode, such as dancing with a prop or using an iconic dance move in their performance. The audience will then select the two finalists.
6. Be the Creator: The final two must each perform a dance they choreographed at home. The audience will vote for the winner.

== Episodes ==
No.	Title	Original release date	U.S. viewers (millions)
1	"Open Those Pods"	May 31, 2022	2.66
Episode 1 Results: Dancers: Marcus Phillips (Occupation: Flight Attendant/Age: 32); Tyra Haynes-Polke (Occupation: Student/Age: 16); Marco Hurtado (Occupation: Jiu-Jitsu Instructor/Age: 52); Sara "Smac" McCreanor (Occupation: Content Creator/Body Manipulator/Age: 29); Jeremy Urann (Occupation: Plus Size Model/Age: 29); David Warren (Occupation: Gymnastics Instructor/Age: 22); Caitlyn Knowles (Occupation: Student/Age: 17); Sierra Schmidt (Occupation: Professional Swimmer/Age: 23); Christina Austin Lopez (Occupation: Theatre Actress/Digital Marketing/Age: 25); Samantha Ortiz (Occupation: Personal Trainer/Fitness Instructor/Age: 33); Ashley Wittrock (Occupation: Teacher/Age: 38); Cameron Hardin (Occupation: Weatherman/Age: 28); All Eyes On You; Music: Mashup of "Don't Wait Up" by Shakira, "Call Me Maybe" by Carly Rae Jepsen, "Dancing On My Own by Robyn (Choreographed by Shakira); Dancers saved: Marcus, Tyra, Marco, Smac, Jeremy, David, Christina, Samantha; Dancers saved by the creators: Caitlyn, Sierra; Dancers eliminated: Ashley, Cameron; Freestyle Battle; Music: "Don't Stop Me Now" by Queen; Battlers: Sierra vs. Tyra, Caitlyn vs. Marcus, Smac vs. Jeremy, Marco vs. Christina, Samantha vs. David; Winners saved: Tyra, Caitlyn, Smac, Marco, Samantha; Dancers saved by the creators: Marcus, Jeremy, David; Dancers eliminated: Sierra, Christina; Dance Along; Music: "Out in the Sun" by Michael Franti & Spearhead (Challenge Choreographed by Nikki Glaser); Top Row Team: David, Tyra, Jeremy, Samantha; Bottom Row Team: Marcus, Smac, Caitlyn, Marco; Winning Team saved: Bottom Row Team; Dancers saved by the creators: Tyra, Jeremy; Dancers eliminated: David, Samantha; Duo Collaboration; Music: "Cold Heart (Pnau remix)" by Elton John & Dua Lipa (Choreographed by Liza Koshy & Camille Kostek); Dancing Duos: Tyra & Jeremy, Caitlyn & Marco, Smac & Marcus; Winning Duos saved: Tyra & Jeremy; Duos saved by the creators: Smac & Marcus; Duos eliminated: Caitlyn & Marco; The Shake-Up; Music: "Good 4 U" by Olivia Rodrigo (Choreographed by Camille Kostek); Dancers saved: Tyra, Smac; Dancers eliminated: Jeremy, Marcus; Be the Creator; Music: "Shut Up and Dance" by Walk the Moon; Runner-Up: Smac; Winner: Tyra
2	"Better When We're Dancing"	June 7, 2022	2.24
Episode 2 Results: Dancers: TBA; Marie Moring (Occupation: Entrepreneur/Age: 46); Jaedin Clark (Occupation: College Student/Cheerleader/Age: 21); Bianca Buca (Occupation: Student/Age: 13); Roxanne Day (Occupation: Stay-at-home Mom/Age: 50); Carlanda Miller (Occupation: Kindergarten Teacher/Age: 37); Julian "Juju" Aranda (Occupation: Student/Age: 9); Keara "Keke" Wilson (Occupation: Digital Marketing/Age: 21); Abel Meseretab (Occupation: Landscaping Assistant/Landscaping Clerk/Age: 29); Tom Shelley (Occupation: Video Game Creator/Age: 35); Ann Marie Muscarello (Occupation: Traveling ICU Nurse/Age: 25); Cameron Campbell (Occupation: Walmart Employee/Age: 28); Luis Carrasquillo (Occupation: Active Duty Army/Age: 43); All Eyes On You; Music: Mashup of "Eye of the Tiger" by Survivor, "Take My Breath" by The Weeknd, "Woman" by Doja Cat (Choreographed by Shakira); Dancers saved: Bianca, Roxanne, Carlanda, Juju, Keke, Abel; Dancers saved by the creators: Marie, Tom; Dancers eliminated: Jaedin, Luis; Freestyle Battle; Music: "Disco Inferno" by The Trammps; Battlers: Cameron vs. Carlanda, Keke vs. Tom, Marie vs. Bianca, Abel vs. Roxanne, Ann Marie vs. Juju; Winners saved: Carlanda, Keke, Bianca, Abel, Juju; Dancers saved by the creators: Cameron, Marie, Roxanne; Dancers eliminated: Tom, Ann Marie; Dance Along; Music: "Life Is a Highway" by Rascal Flatts (Challenge Choreographed by The Miz); Top Row Team: Marie, Bianca, Keke, Abel; Bottom Row Team: Cameron, Carlanda, Roxanne, Juju; Winning Team saved: Top Row Team; Dancers saved by the creators: Carlanda, Juju; Dancers eliminated: Cameron, Roxanne; Duo Collaboration; Music: "It's Tricky" by Run-DMC (Choreographed by Nick Jonas & Liza Koshy); Dancing Duos: Marie & Juju, Keke & Carlanda, Abel & Bianca; Winning Duos saved: Keke & Carlanda; Dancers saved by the creators: Juju, Bianca; Dancers eliminated: Marie, Abel; The Shake-Up; Music: "Higher Love" by Kygo & Whitney Houston (Choreographed by Camille Kostek); Dancers saved: Bianca, Keke; Dancers eliminated: Juju, Carlanda; Be the Creator; Music: "Better When I'm Dancin'" by Meghan Trainor; Runner-Up: Bianca; Winner: Keke
3	"The One Where Nick Dances Salsa"	June 14, 2022	2.12
Episode 3 Results: Dancers: Amar Shere (Occupation: Cardiologist Fellow/Age: 33); Nick Novak (Occupation: Professional Aerial Skier/Age: 26); Jenna Faggart (Occupation: Boutique Owner/Age: 35); Ronald "Rony Boyy" Michel (Occupation: Movement Coach/Age: 22); Nikol Knudson (Occupation: Fitness Instructor/Age: 30); Michele Knudson (Occupation: Hospice Care/Nurse/Age: 59); Shayna Wheatley (Occupation: Fashion Designer/Digital Marketer/Age: 32); Jonah Goddard (Occupation: Police Officer/Age: 27); Dennis Appel (Occupation: Retired Construction/Sheet Metal Worker/Age: 59); Julian Burzynski (Occupation: Dance Instructor/Age: 28); Sydney Ying (Occupation: College Student/Houston Rockets Dancer/Age: 19); Ashanti "Jan'na" McGuire (Occupation: Uber Eats/Food Delivery Driver/Age: 24); All Eyes On You; Music: Mashup of "Hallucinate" by Dua Lipa, "Waiting for Tonight" by Jennifer Lopez, "Dark Horse" by Katy Perry (Choreographed by Camille Kostek); Dancers saved: Jenna, Rony Boyy, Nikol, Shayna, Dennis, Julian, Sydney, Jan'na; Dancers saved by the creators: Amar, Nick; Dancers eliminated: Michele, Jonah; Freestyle Battle; Music: "Edamame" by bbno$; Battlers: Julian vs. Sydney, Nick vs. Jenna, Nikol vs. Rony Boyy, Dennis vs. Jan'na, Shayna vs. Amar; Winners saved: Sydney, Jenna, Nikol, Jan'na, Shayna; Dancers saved by the creators: Julian, Rony Boyy; Dancers eliminated: Nick, Dennis; Dance Along; Music: "Party Up" by DMX (Challenge Choreographed by Akbar Gbaja-Biamila & Matt Iseman); Top Row Team: Sydney, Shayna, Jenna, Jan'na; Bottom Row Team: Rony Boyy, Nikol, Amar, Julian; Winning Team saved: Bottom Row Team; Dancers saved by the creators: Shayna, Jan'na; Dancers eliminated: Sydney, Jenna; Duo Collaboration; Music: "I Like It Like That" by Tito Nieves (Choreographed by Liza Koshy & Shakira); Dancing Duos: Rony Boyy & Julian, Shayna & Nikol, Jan'na & Amar; Winning Duos saved: Shayna & Nikol; Dancers saved by the creators: Julian, Jan'na; Dancers eliminated: Rony Boyy, Amar; The Shake-Up; Music: "Do It to It" by Acraze feat. Cherish (Choreographed by Liza Koshy); Dancers saved: Shayna, Jan'na; Dancers eliminated: Julian, Nikol; Be the Creator; Music: "When I'm Gone" by Alesso & Katy Perry; Runner-Up: Shayna; Winner: Jan'na
4	"Hoops Don't Lie"	June 21, 2022	1.98
Episode 4 Results: Dancers: Nick Gray (Occupation: Senior Sales Manager/Age: 46); Becca Robinson (Occupation: Trader Joe's Employee/Age: 26); Payton Beall (Occupation: 4th Grade Teacher/Age: 24); Sirdarius "Deputy B" Benton (Occupation: Former Retired Law Enforcement Officer/Age: 32); Molly Prewitt (Occupation: General Contractor/Age: 53); Leah Baxter (Occupation: Middle School Dance Teacher/Age: 42); Lily Kate Goehring (Occupation: Student/Age: 15); Abey Cabrera (Occupation: Starbucks Barista/Age: 23); Tia Stokes (Occupation: Stay-at-home Mom/Age: 36); Ayanna Melvin (Occupation: Student/Age: 15); Rick (Ricky) Pond Jr. (Occupation: Graphic Designer/Age: 48); Jake Taylor-Baumann (Occupation: Real Estate Broker/Agent/Age: 31); All Eyes On You; Music: Mashup of "Roses" by Saint Jhn & Imanbek, "Girl Like Me" by Shakira, "OMG" by Usher (Choreographed by Shakira); Dancers saved: Nick, Payton, Deputy B, Leah, Lily, Abey, Tia, Ayanna; Dancers saved by the creators: Becca, Ricky; Dancers eliminated: Molly, Jake; Freestyle Battle; Music: "Worth It" by Fifth Harmony; Battlers: Deputy B vs. Abey, Becca vs. Nick, Ayanna vs. Leah, Tia vs. Payton, Ricky vs. Lily; Winners saved: Abey, Becca, Ayanna, Tia, Lily; Dancers saved by the creators: Deputy B, Nick, Leah; Dancers eliminated: Payton, Ricky; Dance Along; Music: "Wow" by Post Malone (Challenge Choreographed by Jabari Banks); Top Row Team: Deputy B, Abey, Leah, Lily; Bottom Row Team: Becca, Ayanna, Tia, Nick; Winning Team saved: Bottom Row Team; Dancers saved by the creators: Abey, Lily; Dancers eliminated: Deputy B, Leah; Duo Collaboration; Music: "Pump Up the Jam" by Technotronic (Choreographed by Liza Koshy & Camille Kostek); Dancing Duos: Tia & Nick, Lily & Becca, Abey & Ayanna; Winning Duos saved: Abey & Ayanna; Dancers saved by the creators: Tia, Lily; Dancers eliminated: Nick, Becca; The Shake-Up; Music: "Mi Gente" by J Balvin & Willy William (Choreographed by Liza Koshy); Dancers saved: Lily, Ayanna; Dancers eliminated: Abey, Tia; Be the Creator; Music: "Confident" by Demi Lovato; Runner-Up: Ayanna; Winner: Lily
5	"Belly Roll Challenge"	June 28, 2022	2.18
Episode 5 Results: Dancers: Ben Winters (Occupation: Dentist/Age: 32); Roy Mayes IV (Boksauze) (Occupation: Student/Age: 10); Morgan Chami (Occupation: U.S. Army Active Duty/Age: 33); Devin Santiago (Occupation: Medical Lab Technician/Age: 28); Adam Boreland (Occupation: Entrepreneur/Dance Teacher/Age: 33); Valentina Canas (Occupation: Digital Marketer/Age: 22); Jasmine Mashkuli (Occupation: Student/Age: 12); Liz Tran Salon (Occupation: Owner/Age: 49); Shelby Skipper (Skip) (Occupation: High School Football Coach/Age: 33); Radical Phoenixx (Rad) (Occupation: Call Center Agent/Age: 29); Robin Brackbill (Occupation: Small Business Owner/Age: 46); Josh Johnson (Occupation: Teacher/Age: 46); All Eyes On You; Music: Mashup of "That's Not My Name" by The Ting Tings, "Cake by the Ocean" by DNCE, "The Time (Dirty Bit)" by Black Eyed Peas (Choreographed by Nick Jonas); Dancers saved: Boksauze, Morgan, Adam, Valentina, Jasmine, Liz, Skip, Rad; Dancers saved by the creators: Ben, Josh; Dancers eliminated: Devin, Robin; Freestyle Battle; Music: "Swalla" by Jason Derulo feat. Nicki Minaj and Ty Dolla Sign; Battlers: Boksauze vs. Morgan, Josh vs. Skip, Jasmine vs. Valentina, Ben vs. Rad, Adam vs. Liz; Winners saved: Boksauze, Skip, Valentina, Rad, Adam; Dancers saved by the creators: Morgan, Josh, Jasmine; Dancers eliminated: Ben, Liz; Dance Along; Music: "Get Down on It" by Kool & the Gang (Challenge Choreographed by Walker Hayes); Top Row Team: Morgan, Adam, Valentina, Rad; Bottom Row Team: Boksauze, Jasmine, Josh, Skip; Winning Team saved: Bottom Row Team; Dancers saved by the creators: Adam, Valentina; Dancers eliminated: Morgan, Rad; Duo Collaboration; Music: "Fergalicious" by Fergie feat. will.i.am (Choreographed by Liza Koshy & Camille Kostek); Dancing Duos: Josh & Jasmine, Valentina & Boksauze, Adam & Skip; Winning Duos saved: Valentina & Boksauze; Dancers saved by the creators: Jasmine, Skip; Dancers eliminated: Josh, Adam; The Shake-Up; Music: "Whenever, Wherever" by Shakira (Choreographed by Shakira); Dancers saved: Skip, Valentina; Dancers eliminated: Jasmine, Boksauze; Be the Creator; Music: "Love Myself" by Hailee Steinfeld; Runner-Up: Valentina; Winner: Skip
6	"Shakira Gets Down to Business"	July 5, 2022	1.93
Episode 6 Results: Dancers: Lenny Faverey (Occupation: Doorman/Age: 63); Sebastian Riley (Occupation: Student/Age: 14); Catherine Ding (Occupation: Orthodontist/Age: 30); Maria Baghdasaryan (Occupation: Student/Age: 9); Robin Schreiber (Occupation: Freelance Artist & Retired Teacher/Age: 72); Zack Lugo (Occupation: Content Creator/Entrepreneur/Age: 20); Ashanti "LèDON" McIntosh (Occupation: Rapper/Age: 29); Alan Medina Chaparro (Occupation: Theme Park Dancer/Disneyland Worker/Age: 34); Karen Fujimoto (Occupation: Vegas Showgirl/Age: 43); Christian Ciocca (Occupation: Restaurant Employee/Age: 23); Macky CatoCade-James (Occupation: Home Remodeling Salesman/Age: 35); Natalie Stuart (Occupation: Elementary School Teacher/Age: 35); All Eyes On You; Music: Mashup of "Don't Start Now" by Dua Lipa, "Everybody (Backstreet's Back)" by Backstreet Boys, "Wake Me Up" by Avicii feat. Aloe Blacc (Choreographed by Camille Kostek & Nick Jonas); Dancers saved: Lenny, Sebastian, Catherine, Maria, Zack, Alan, Karen, Natalie; Dancers saved by the creators: LèDON, Christian; Dancers eliminated: Robin, Macky; Freestyle Battle; Music: "Nails, Hair, Hips, Heels" by Todrick Hall; Battlers: Christian vs. Karen, Sebastian vs. Maria, Lenny vs. Alan, Catherine vs. Zack, Natalie vs. LèDON; Winners saved: Christian, Sebastian, Lenny, Catherine, LèDON; Dancers saved by the creators: Maria, Alan, Natalie; Dancers eliminated: Karen, Zack; Dance Along; Music: "Livin' on a Prayer" by Bon Jovi (Challenge Choreographed by Scott Evans); Top Row Team: Christian, Natalie, Alan, Sebastian; Bottom Row Team: Lenny, Catherine, Maria, LèDON; Winning Team saved: Bottom Row Team; Dancers saved by the creators: Christian, Sebastian; Dancers eliminated: Natalie, Alan; Duo Collaboration; Music: "Butter" by BTS (Choreographed by Liza Koshy & Camille Kostek); Dancing Duos: Lenny & Maria, Catherine & LèDON, Christian & Sebastian; Winning Duos saved: Catherine & LèDON; Dancers/Duos saved by the creators: Maria, Sebastian; Dancers/Duos eliminated: Lenny, Christian; The Shake-Up; Music: "The Business" by Tiësto (Choreographed by Shakira); Dancers saved: Sebastian, LèDON; Dancers eliminated: Catherine, Maria; Be the Creator; Music: "Dynamite" by BTS; Runner-Up: Sebastian; Winner: LèDON
7	"Nick and Shakira Push It"	July 12, 2022	2.23
Episode 7 Results: Dancers: Jeremy Martinez (Occupation: Construction Worker/Age: 33); Travasha Winfrey (Occupation: Flight Attendant/Age: 33); Rishi Sharma (Occupation: Doctor/Age: 30); Katrina Nichole (Occupation: Fitness Instructor/Age: 30); Allison Jacobs (Occupation: Hair Model/Age: 39); Dylon Hoffpauir (Occupation: NFL Cheerleader/Age: 30); Jaden "Jaeden" Gomez (Occupation: Digital Marketing/Age: 21); Kira Chan (Occupation: Student/Age: 13); Morgan Hennessy-Shea (Morgan H.) (Occupation: Student/Age: 22); Tyler Cooper (Occupation: Food Delivery Driver/Age: 22); Morgan Gardiner (Morgan G.) (Occupation: Student/Age: 19); Chase Castle (Occupation: Student/Age: 9); All Eyes On You; Music: Mashup of "HandClap" by Fitz and the Tantrums, "Toxic" by SI US PLAU, "As Long as You Love Me" by Justin Bieber (Choreographed by Liza Koshy); Dancers saved: Rishi, Dylon, Jaeden, Kira, Morgan H., Tyler, Morgan G., Chase; Dancers saved by the creators: Jeremy, Katrina; Dancers eliminated: Travasha, Allison; Freestyle Battle; Music: "Party Rock Anthem" by LMFAO; Battlers: Chase vs. Katrina, Morgan H. vs. Tyler, Jeremy vs. Morgan G., Jaeden vs. Dylon, Kira vs. Rishi; Winners saved: Chase, Tyler, Morgan G., Dylon, Kira; Dancers saved by the creators: Morgan H., Jeremy, Rishi; Dancers eliminated: Katrina, Jaeden; Dance Along; Music: "Light Switch" by Charlie Puth (Challenge Choreographed by Nathan Chen); Top Row Team: Morgan H., Kira, Morgan G., Dylon; Bottom Row Team: Chase, Jeremy, Tyler, Rishi; Winning Team saved: Top Row Team; Dancers saved by the creators: Chase, Tyler; Dancers eliminated: Jeremy, Rishi; Duo Collaboration; Music: "Push It" by Salt-N-Pepa (Choreographed by Nick Jonas & Shakira); Dancing Duos: Chase & Kira, Morgan H. & Morgan G., Dylon & Tyler; Winning Duos saved: Chase & Kira; Duos saved by the creators: Dylon & Tyler; Duos eliminated: Morgan H. & Morgan G.; The Shake-Up; Music: "My Sharona (Re-Recorded)" by The Knack (Choreographed by Camille Kostek); Dancers saved: Tyler, Kira; Dancers eliminated: Chase, Dylon; Be the Creator; Music: "Electricity (feat. Diplo & Mark Ronson)" by Silk City & Dua Lipa; Runner-Up: Tyler; Winner: Kira
8	"Robot Grooves"	July 19, 2022	2.19
Episode 8 Results: Dancers: Michael Makin (Occupation: Retired/Age: 58); Meghan Lalonde (Occupation: Assistant Retail Manager/Age: 31); Mahak Hamid (Occupation: Student/Age: 18); JT Laybourne (Occupation: Business Owner/Age: 37); Taylor Sims (Occupation: Pediatric Dentist/Age: 28); Theresa Cizmar (Occupation: Retired Business Owner/Age: 67); Jaylin James (Occupation: Medical Sales Rep/Age: 24); Destiny Williams (Occupation: Grad/Theology Student/Age: 24); DeMarcus White (Occupation: Digital Marketing/Age: 26); Jemarcus White (Occupation: Digital Marketing/Content Creator/Age: 26); Kayla Elledge (Occupation: Fitness Coach/Age: 26); Esh Patel (Occupation: Dentist/Age: 28); All Eyes On You; Music: Mashup of "Fireball" by Pitbull, "Celebration" by Kool & the Gang, "Bust a Move" by Young MC (Choreographed by Nick Jonas); Dancers saved: Michael, Taylor, Jaylin, Destiny, DeMarcus, Jemarcus, Kayla, Esh; Dancers saved by the creators: Meghan, Mahak; Dancers eliminated: JT, Theresa; Freestyle Battle; Music: "Lil Bit" by Nelly & Florida Georgia Line; Battlers: DeMarcus vs. Destiny, Jemarcus vs. Mahak, Kayla vs. Michael, Esh vs. Taylor, Meghan vs. Jaylin; Winners saved: Destiny, Mahak, Michael, Esh, Jaylin; Dancers saved by the creators: DeMarcus, Jemarcus, Taylor; Dancers eliminated: Kayla, Meghan; Dance Along; Music: "Motivation" by Normani (Challenge Choreographed by Bianca Belair); Top Row Team: Taylor, Michael, Destiny, Jaylin; Bottom Row Team: Jemarcus, DeMarcus, Esh, Mahak; Winning Team saved: Bottom Row Team; Dancers saved by the creators: Michael, Destiny; Dancers eliminated: Taylor, Jaylin; Duo Collaboration; Music: "It Takes Two" by Rob Base and DJ E-Z Rock (Choreographed by Liza Koshy & Camille Kostek); Dancing Duos: Jemarcus & DeMarcus, Esh & Michael, Destiny & Mahak; Winning Duos saved: Destiny & Mahak; Duos saved by the creators: Esh & Michael; Duos eliminated: Jemarcus & DeMarcus; The Shake-Up; Music: "Te Felicito" by Shakira feat. Rauw Alejandro (Choreographed by Shakira); Dancers saved: Esh, Destiny; Dancers eliminated: Michael, Mahak; Be the Creator; Music: "Feel So Close" by Calvin Harris; Runner-Up: Destiny; Winner: Esh

== Reception ==
Viewership and ratings per episode of Dancing with Myself
No.	Title	Air date	Rating (18–49)	Viewers (millions)
1	"Open Those Pods"	May 31, 2022	0.4	2.66
2	"Better When We're Dancing"	June 7, 2022	0.4	2.24
3	"The One Where Nick Dances Salsa"	June 14, 2022	0.3	2.12
4	"Hoops Don't Lie"	June 21, 2022	0.3	1.98
5	"Belly Roll Challenge"	June 28, 2022	0.4	2.18
6	"Shakira Gets Down to Business"	July 5, 2022	0.3	1.93
7	"Nick and Shakira Push It"	July 12, 2022	0.4	2.23
8	"Robot Grooves"	July 19, 2022	0.3	2.19
