= The Improper Bostonian =

Defunct American women's magazine

- Camille Kostek on the cover for the Oct/Nov 2018 Wedding Issue
- Editor: Matt Martinelli
- Categories: Regional
- Frequency: Bi-weekly
- Publisher: Wendy Semonian Eppich (2003–2019)
- Total circulation (2017): 60,000
- Founded: 1991
- First issue: August 1991
- Final issue: April 24, 2019
- Company: Improper Publications, Inc.
- Country: United States
- Based in: Boston
- Language: English
- Website: The Improper Bostonian

The Improper Bostonian was a glossy lifestyle magazine first published in August 1991 "highlighting the people and places that make Boston a world-class city."

After 28 years, publisher Wendy Semonian Eppich announced that the magazine ceased publication effective April 25, 2019.

== History ==
The magazine came out bi-weekly and reported on the area trends in a young and entertaining way. The magazine was a staple in Greater Boston, distributed free at kiosks within city limits, and available via a $29.95 annual subscription to people living outside the municipality. The magazine covered music, theater, sports, fashion, personals, shopping and local events. The magazine also held or sponsored events in the city ranging from balls to benefits for the homeless and children.

When it was first published, it was a newsprint tabloid and—via several upgrades—it changed format to a glossy magazine. The Improper Bostonian was founded by Mark Semonian in 1991. His sister, Wendy Semonian Eppich, succeeded him as publisher in 2003. The publication was owned and operated by the Semonian family from its inception.

In 2019, it was distributed to 274 newsboxes and 600 other locations around Greater Boston, including colleges and restaurants, with the magazine being delivered to 13,000 homes reaching 350,000 readers each year.

On the magazine ceasing its publication in 2019, Eppich stated "I think The Improper has become a part of the fabric of the city... I think we brought some fun to the city for 28 years".
