= Lerdala =

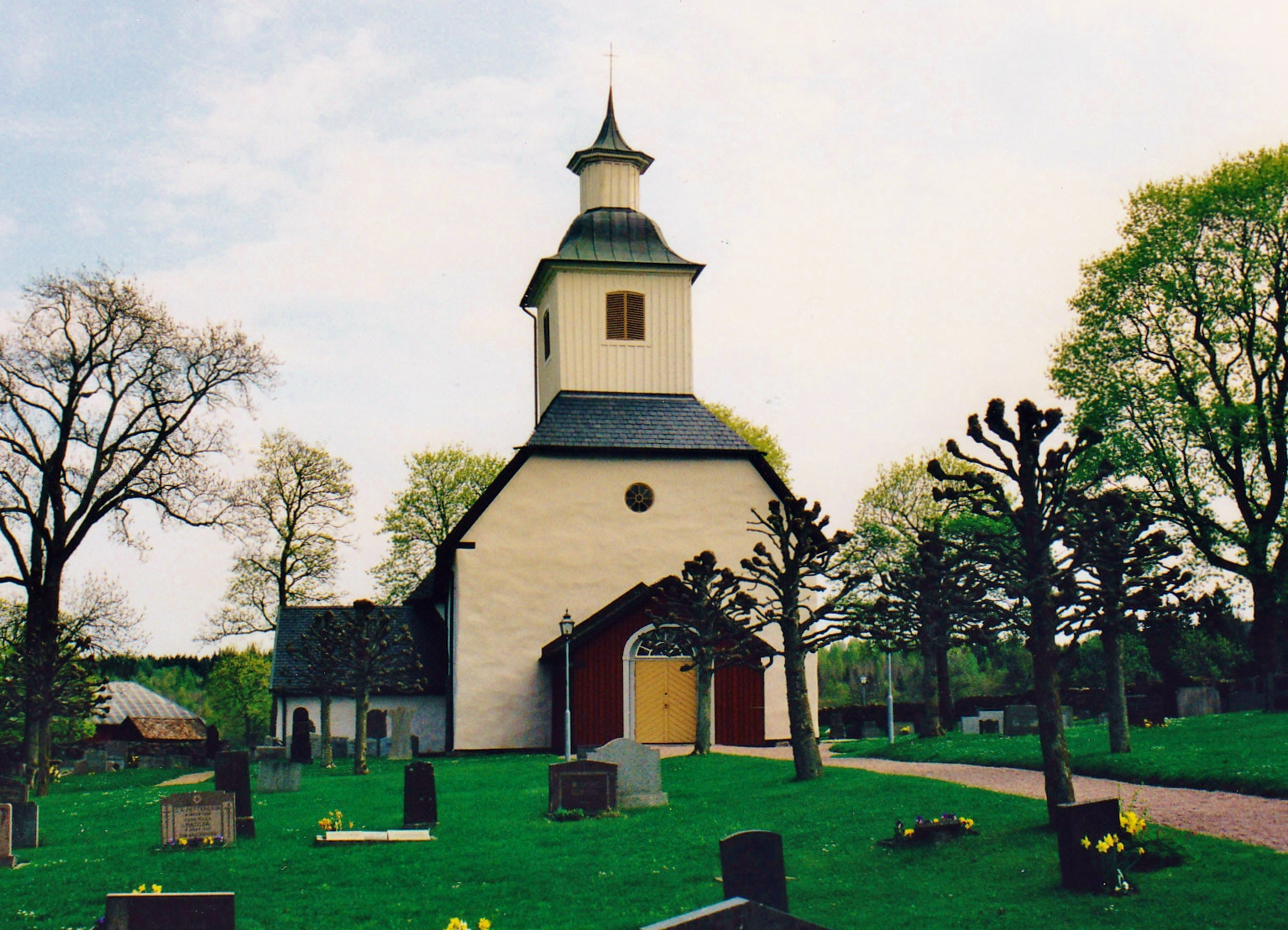
- The church in Lerdala

- Location within Västra Götaland Location within Sweden
- Coordinates: 58°29′N 13°43′E
- Country: Sweden
- Province: Västergötland
- County: Västra Götaland County
- Municipality: Skövde Municipality

Area
  - Total: 0.63 km^{2} (0.24 sq mi)

Population (31 December 2010)
  - Total: 409
  - Density: 647/km^{2} (1,680/sq mi)
- Time zone: UTC+1 (CET)
  - Summer (DST): UTC+2 (CEST)

Lerdala is a locality situated in Skövde Municipality, Västra Götaland County, Sweden with 409 inhabitants in 2010.

The settlement consists of primarily summer villas. Lerdala has a preschool, and elementary school for children aged 6-12.

== History ==
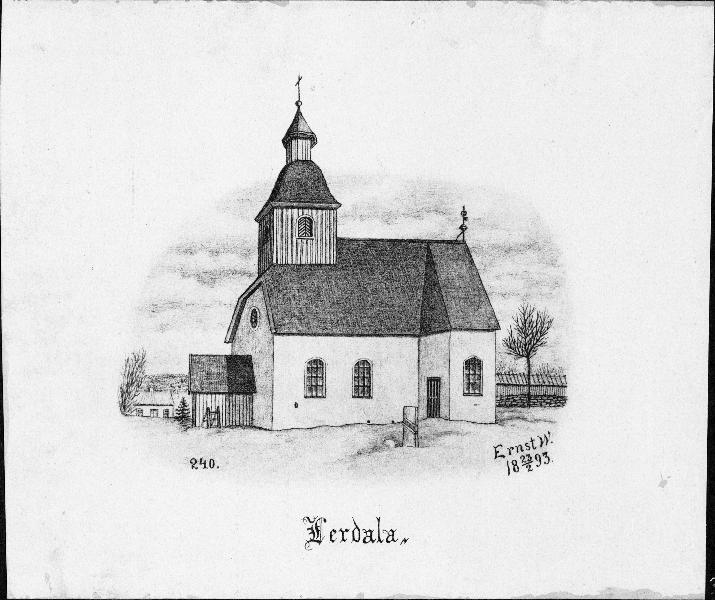
Lerdala church in 1893.

A Stone Age shaft-hole axe and a Viking double-edged sword have been found in the area. Which shows that the area has had human activity since the stone age. The church in Lerdala was constructed in the 12th or 13th century.

In 1909, a railway line was built between Skara and Timmersdala. Lerdala received a station on the line. However, passenger railway service was discontinued in 1932.

Lerdala's economy was fueled by agriculture, forestry and some small scale industry. The modern villa community began to take shape in the 1950s.

== Geography ==
Lerdala is on the northwest slope of Billingen and is located approximately 20 kilometres northwest of Skövde.

== Recreation ==
Lerdala is close to many hiking and walking trails which are maintained by the local sports club - Lerdala IF. The settlement is also in close proximity to many lakes.

== Notable people ==
- Shy Martin, singer and songwriter
- Marcus Hellner, cross-country skier
- Johanna Frändén, sports journalist

== Gallery ==
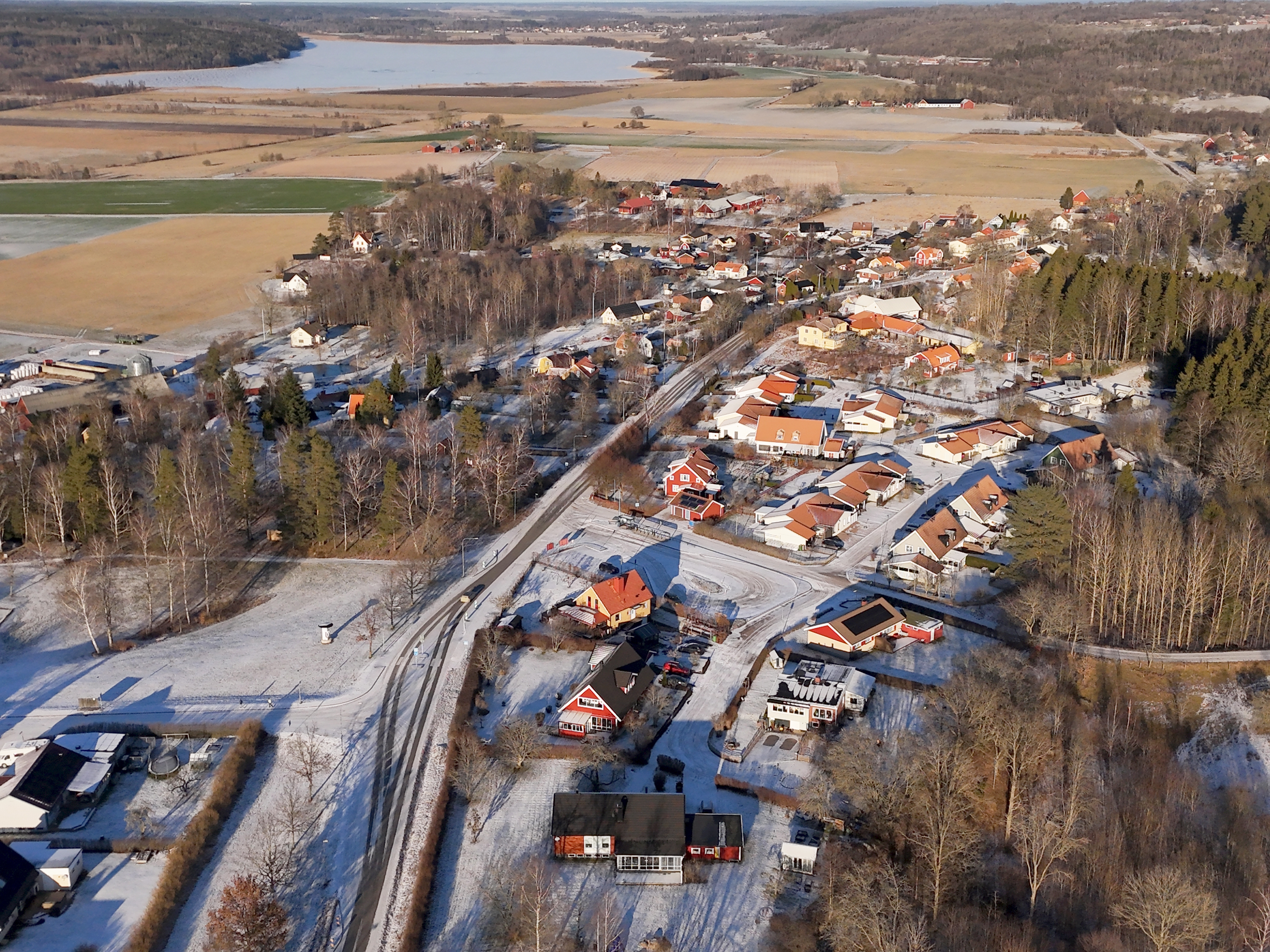
Lerdala.

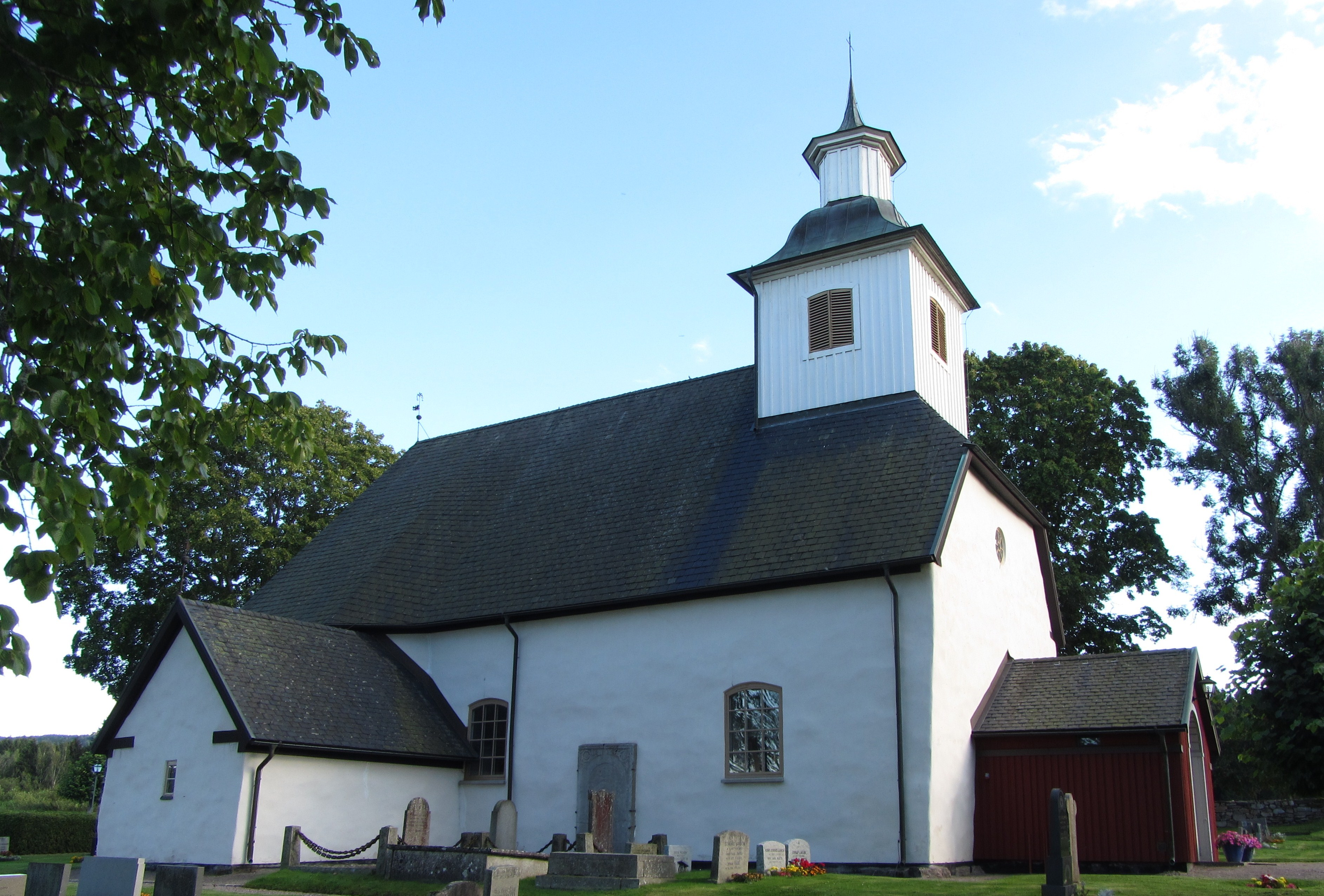
Another view of Lerdala church.

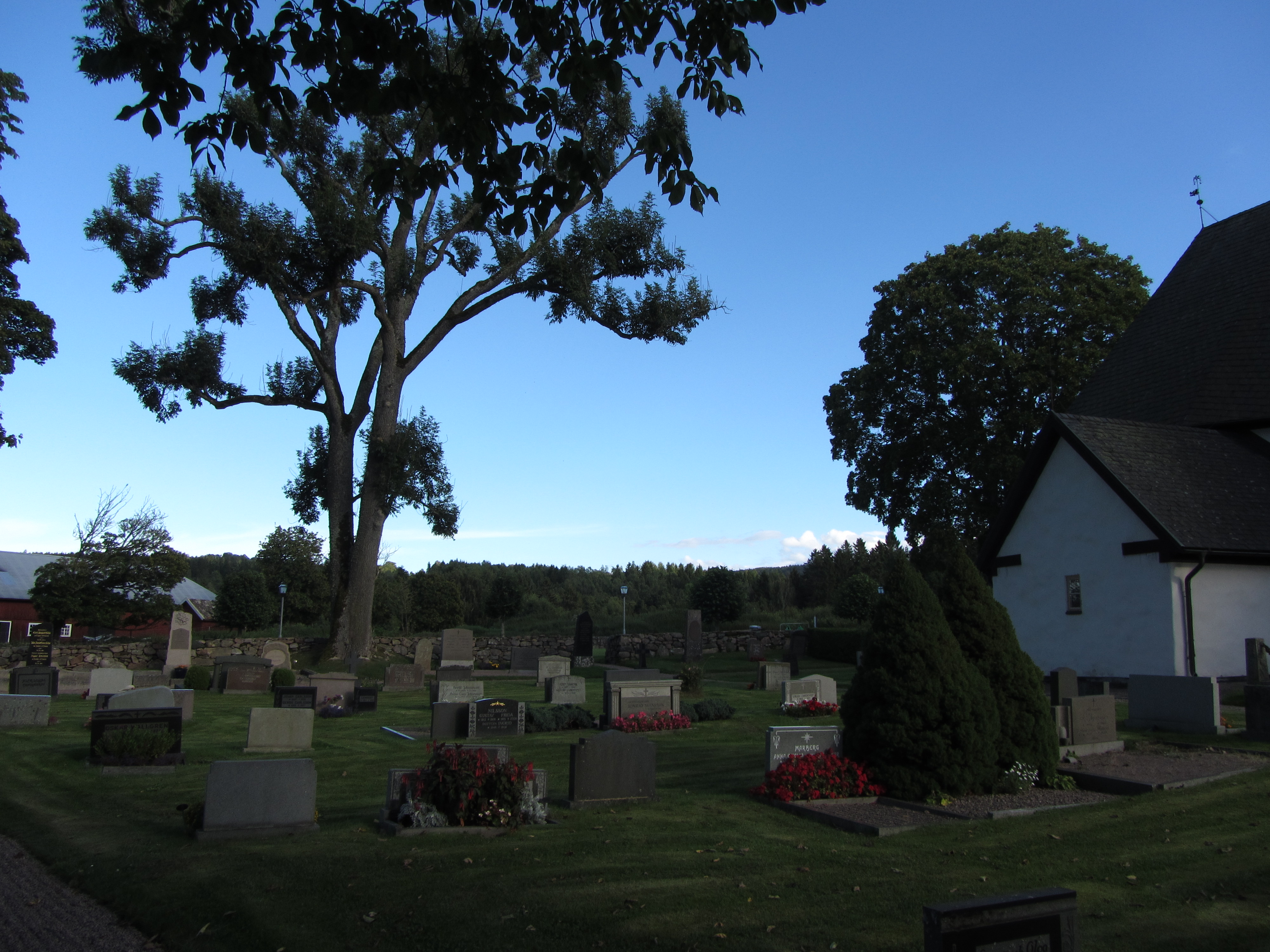
The church graveyard.

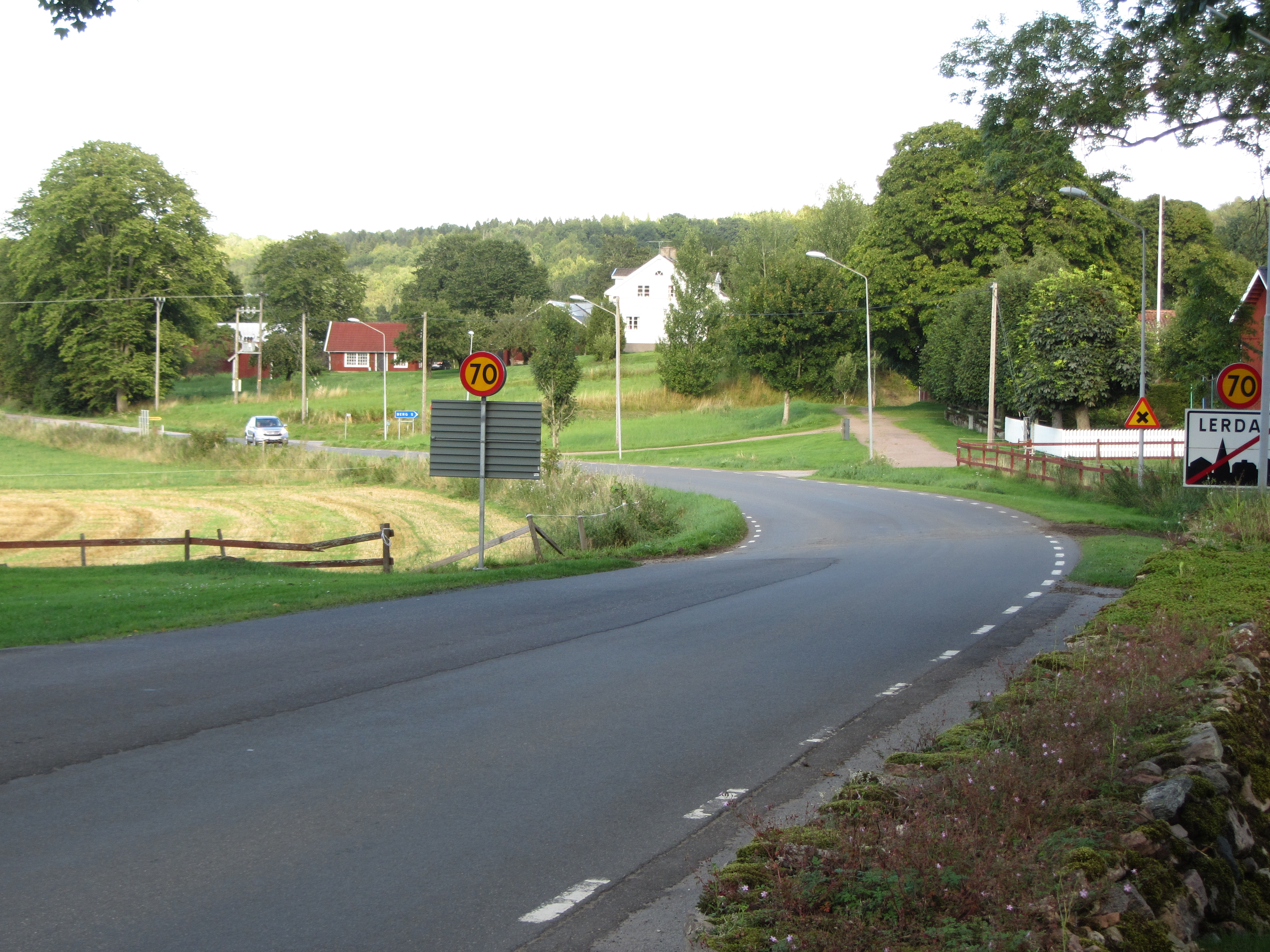
A thoroughfare in Lerdala.
