= Georgia Ku =

English musician

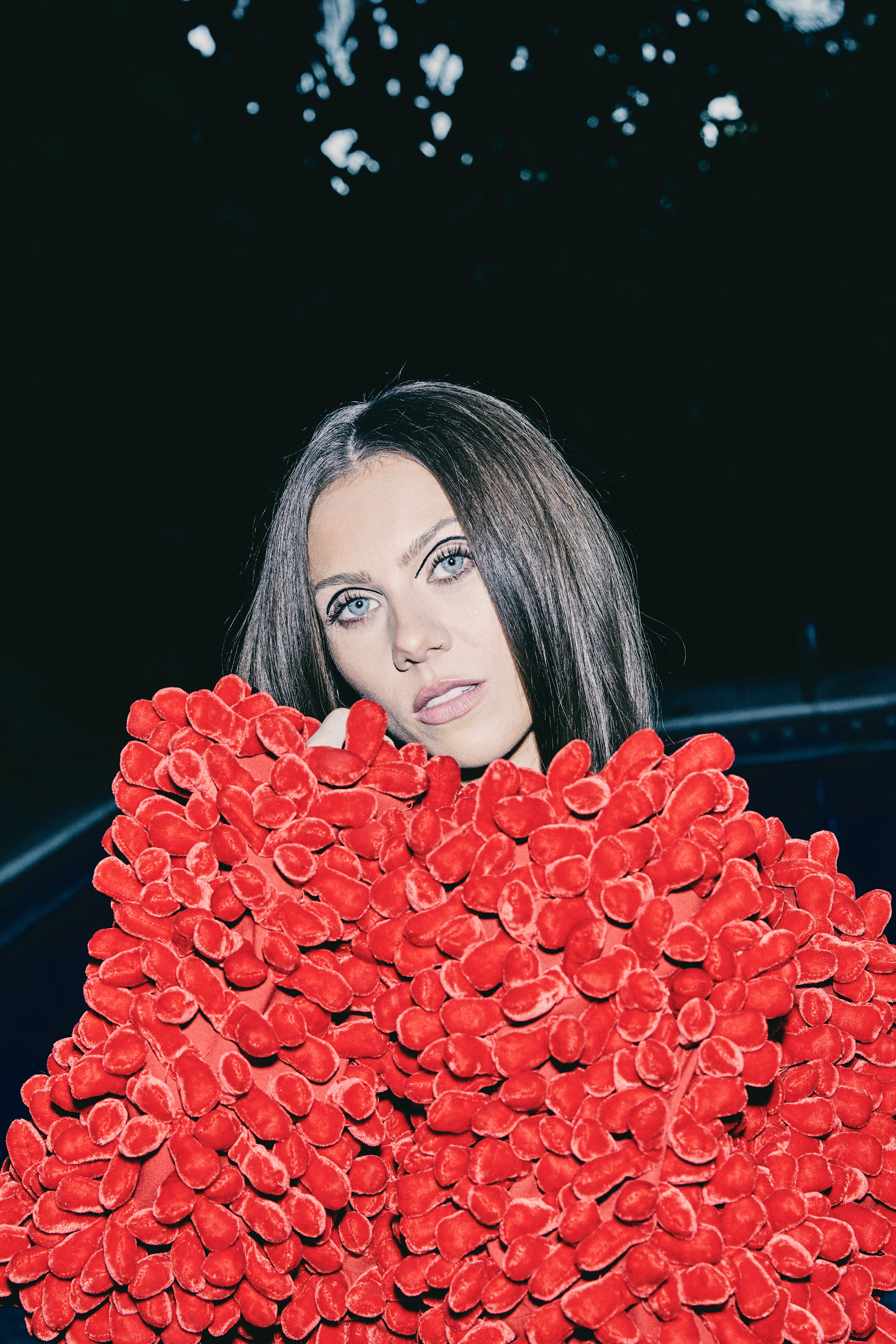
- Georgia Ku in December 2019

Background information
- Born: 20 February 1993 (age 33)
- Origin: England
- Genres: Pop; R&B; EDM
- Occupations: Singer; songwriter
- Years active: 2015–present
- Labels: Atlantic; Primary Wave

Georgia Ku Overton (born 20 February 1993) is an English singer and songwriter. She was a featured artist on the 2018 NOTD and Felix Jaehn hit single "So Close". The song has appeared on numerous charts including at number 11 on the Billboard Dance/Electronic Songs chart. Ku has also written songs for numerous notable acts including Martin Garrix, Dua Lipa, Iggy Azalea, Zedd, and others.

== Career ==
Ku got her start in around 2015 as a vocalist and songwriter. That year, she was featured on the Dillon Francis and Skrillex track, "Bun Up The Dance" and the Nicky Romero and Stadiumx song, "Harmony". She also co-wrote several songs including Zedd's "Illusion" featuring Echosmith and Skylar Stecker's "Crazy Beautiful". In 2016, she was featured on the Getter track, "Blood", and appeared on two KNOXA songs, "Bang Bang" and "Something More". She also co-wrote the Fifth Harmony song, "1000 Hands" of their 7/27 album.

Ku's song "Bloodline" was featured on the soundtrack for the 2016 film, The Birth of a Nation. At the end of the year, Ku was featured on the Party Favor single, "In My Head", which reached number 7 on the Billboard Dance/Mix Show Airplay chart. In early 2017, the Martin Garrix and Dua Lipa song "Scared to Be Lonely", which Ku co-wrote, was released. It peaked at number 14 on the UK Singles Chart. That year, Ku also co-wrote Iggy Azalea's "Switch" featuring Anitta.

In 2018, Ku was featured on several tracks, including Captain Cuts and Zookëper's "Do You Think About Me?" and NOTD and Felix Jaehn's "So Close" (which also featured Captain Cuts). The latter song reached number one on both the Dance Club Songs and the Dance/Mix Show Airplay charts. It also reached number 11 on the Billboard Dance/Electronic Songs chart, number 40 on the Mainstream Top 40 chart, and number 20 on the UK Dance Singles chart. 2018 also saw the release of two songs Ku co-wrote: MØ's "Mercy" (featuring What So Not and Two Feet) and Rita Ora's "Soul Survivor".

In 2019, Ku co-wrote the Jai Wolf song, "Still Sleeping", off his album, The Cure to Loneliness.

Ku was a featured artist on the 2018 NOTD and Felix Jaehn single "So Close", with a music video starring Sports Illustrated Swimsuit cover girl Camille Kostek.

== Discography ==
=== Extended plays ===
Title	Details
Real	Released: June 26, 2020; Label: Atlantic; Format: Digital download, streaming

=== Singles as lead artist ===
List of singles as a lead artist, showing year released and album name
Title	Year	Album
"Bloodline"	2016	The Birth of a Nation: The Inspired By Album
"What Do I Do?"	2019	Real
"Ever Really Know"	2020	Real
"Lighthouse"	2020	Real
"Don't You Hold Me Down" (with Alan Walker)	2021	Walker Racing League
"Back To You" (with Corsak and Moti)	2021	Non-album single

=== Singles as featured artist ===
List of singles as a featured artist, showing year released and album name
Title	Year	Peak positions								Certifications	Album
Title	Year	UK Dance	AUS	GER	SWE	US Top 40	US Dance	US Dance Club	US Dance Airplay	Certifications	Album
"In My Head" (Party Favor featuring Georgia Ku)	2016	—	—	—	—	—	—	—	7		Party & Destroy
"So Close" (NOTD and Felix Jaehn featuring Captain Cuts and Georgia Ku)	2018	20	45	45	77	40	11	1	1	RIAA: Platinum; ARIA: 2× Platinum	Breathe
"Love You Now" (Cash Cash featuring Georgia Ku)	2020	—	—	—	—	—	—	—	—		Say It Like You Feel It
"Nights Like That" (Bunt featuring Georgia Ku)	2020	—	—	—	—	—	—	—	—		Non-album singles
"2019" (Martin Jensen featuring Georgia Ku)	2021	—	—	—	—	—	—	—	—		Non-album singles
"I Got a Feeling" (Felix Jaehn and Robin Schulz featuring Georgia Ku)	2021	—	—	—	—	—	—	—	—		Breathe
"Call On Me" (Sam Feldt featuring Georgia Ku)	2021	—	—	—	—	—	—	—	—		Non-album singles
"Shell Shock" (Nghtmre and Zomboy featuring Georgia Ku)	2021	—	—	—	—	—	—	—	—		Non-album singles
"Demons" (Steve Aoki featuring Georgia Ku)	2022	—	—	—	—	—	—	—	—		Hiroquest: Genesis
"—" denotes a recording that did not chart or was not released in that territory.

=== Guest appearances ===
List of guest appearances
Title	Year	Other performer(s)	Album
"Bun Up The Dance"	2015	Dillon Francis and Skrillex	This Mixtape Is Fire
"Harmony"	2015	Nicky Romero and Stadiumx	Non-album single
"Blood"	2016	Getter	Radical Dude!
"Bang Bang"	2016	KNOXA	Non-album singles
"Something More"	2016	KNOXA	Non-album singles
"Static"	2016	Cazzette	Non-album singles
"Do You Think About Me?"	2018	Captain Cuts and Zookëper	Non-album singles
"Hold On"	2019	Illenium	Ascend

=== Songwriting ===
List of songwriting credits
Song	Year	Artist	Album	Notes
"Illusion"	2015	Zedd featuring Echosmith	True Colors	
"Crazy Beautiful"	2015	Skylar Stecker	This Is Me	
"Low"	2015	Inna	Inna / Body and the Sun	
"Take Me Higher"	2015	Inna	Inna / Body and the Sun	
"1000 Hands"	2016	Fifth Harmony	7/27	
"Scared to Be Lonely"	2017	Martin Garrix and Dua Lipa	Non-album singles	UK No. 14
"Switch"	2017	Iggy Azalea featuring Anitta	Non-album singles	AUS No. 180
"Bounce Right Back"	2018	Jaira Burns	Burn Slow	
"Didn't I"	2018	Jaira Burns	Burn Slow	
"Soul Survivor"	2018	Rita Ora	Phoenix	
"Mercy"	2018	MØ featuring What So Not and Two Feet	Forever Neverland	
"Queen"	2018	Loren Gray	Non-album single	
"Still Sleeping"	2019	Jai Wolf	The Cure to Loneliness	
"목소리 (Voice)"	2020	Loona	[12:00]	
"Star (목소리 English Version)"	2020	Loona	[12:00]	
"Cambia el Paso"	2021	Jennifer Lopez and Rauw Alejandro	Non-album single	
"Steady"	2024	NCT Wish	Steady	
"Right Hand Girl"	2025	TWICE	This Is For	
"Little Miss"	2025	Girlset	Non-album single	
