= Dune Jewelry =

American jewelry company

- Company type: Private
- Industry: jewelry
- Founded: 2010
- Founder: Holly Daniels Christensen
- Headquarters: United States
- Area served: Worldwide
- Website: dunejewelry.com

Dune Jewelry Inc. is an American manufacturer of jewelry in Massachusetts. It was started in 2010 by Holly Daniels Christensen. Some of its designs incorporate sand collected from beaches or elsewhere.

== Background ==
In 2007, Christensen started making sand jewelry for family and friends, by 2010 she launched Dune Jewelry and served as its chief operating officer since. Over the years, the company's Sandbank– the world's largest– had collected 5,000 samples from beaches, sports venues, trails, mountaintops, historical locations and iconic events from all over the globe. The company's handcrafted products have since been distributed by over 800 retailers worldwide.

== Recognition ==
- In 2018, Inc. magazine included the company in their annual list of fastest-growing companies, listing a three-year revenue growth of 164% and a 2017 revenue of $3.4 million.
- In 2017, the company was awarded the Women-Owned Business of the Year Award for Massachusetts and New England.
