= Maro (Lebanese singer) =

Lebanese singer-songwriter

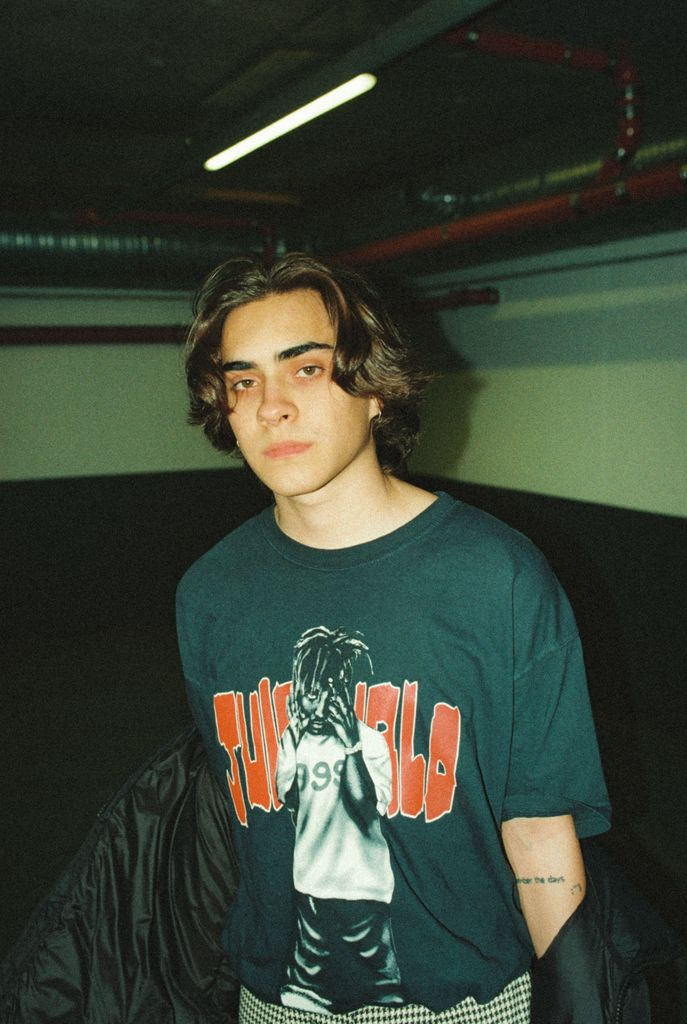

Background information
- Born: Marwan Daou; August 2, 2000 (age 26); Beirut, Lebanon
- Genres: Pop; Indie pop
- Occupations: Singer-songwriter, YouTuber
- Label: SNAFU Records

YouTube information
- Channel: Maro
- Subscribers: 768 thousand
- Views: 64.7 million
- Last updated: August 5th, 2026

Marwan Daou (born August 2, 2000), better known as Maro, is a Lebanese singer-songwriter and YouTuber from Beirut. He started his musical career posting cover videos on his YouTube channel in 2015, and gained a following in 2018. In 2019, Maro caught the attention of tech-music label SNAFU Records, which led to him signing a deal as an original pop artist. Maro's debut single "Carsick" was produced by Carl Falk and Albin Nedler, and released in August 2020, followed by "Take It Back", released in January 2021.

== Early life ==
Maro was born on August 2, 2000, in Beirut, Lebanon. His father had roots in Lebanon while his mother was from Ukraine. Due to the conflict surrounding Lebanon, they were forced to move many times during his early teenage years. Maro described creativity and writing songs as a coping mechanism to deal with the loneliness he experienced from moving around the country.

Maro speaks 4 languages, French, Russian, Arabic, and English, and could additionally sing in Turkish, Italian and Spanish. In his teenage years, he was taught to play the piano by his grandmother, and in the second grade, and he taught himself to play the guitar through watching YouTube tutorials. He started uploading videos to his YouTube channel in 2015, playing the guitar and covering a variety of songs, in multiple languages and from different decades.

After Maro's debut as an original pop artist, he cited his parents' music tastes as a major influence, which contributed to his sound by drawing inspiration from both Lebanese and Ukrainian culture.

== Career ==
Maro's follower amount grew substantially on YouTube in 2018 after uploading a cover of "Falling Down" by Lil Peep and XXXTentacion. Maro was noticed by Norwegian manager Eirik Schistad, and not long after, they started working together. In 2019, Maro caught the attention of the Stockholm and Los Angeles-based music-tech label, SNAFU Records. After a visit to the Stockholm studio, he signed a deal with the label as an original artist.

Maro released his first original single "Carsick" in August 2020. Produced by Carl Falk and Albin Nedler. One of the most popular songs Maro covered on his YouTube channel was Frank Sinatra's "Fly Me to the Moon", which was sampled in the outro of "Carsick". Maro described "Carsick" as a song about love and the repetitive cycle of toxic back-and-forth relationships. Maro's second single, "Take It Back", was released in January 2021 along with a music video produced in Oslo, Norway.

== Discography ==
=== Singles ===
Title	Release date
"Carsick"	August 14, 2020
"Take it Back"	January 22, 2021
"Heart to Spare"	April 14, 2021
"Addicted to Her Sadness"	June 2, 2021
"Hellstorm"	March 17, 2022
"Stuck in the Friendzone"	June 10, 2022
"Start Again"	August 18, 2022
"It's All Over"	October 28, 2022
"Never Let You Go"	July 28, 2023
"House Along the Road"	November 10, 2023
"All I Got"	May 31, 2025

=== Albums ===
Title	Release date	Number of songs
Words From My Bedroom	November 11, 2022	10
