= Tove Styrke discography =

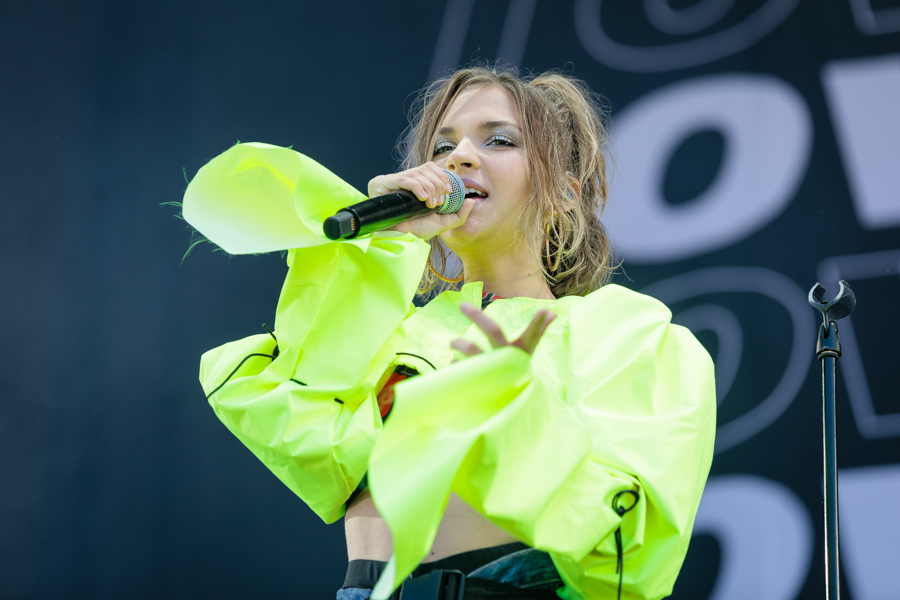
- Styrke performing in 2018
- Studio albums: 4
- EPs: 2
- Singles: 30
- Music videos: 20

The discography of Swedish singer Tove Styrke consists of four studio albums, two extended plays (EPs), thirty singles (including five as a featured artist), and twenty music videos. At the age of sixteen, Styrke finished in third place on the sixth season of Idol in December 2009. She was signed then to Sony Music and released her debut single "Million Pieces" in June 2010. Her debut studio album Tove Styrke (2010) received positive critical response for its electropop sound. The album earned a gold certification by the Swedish Recording Industry Association (GLF). The single "White Light Moment" was a commercial success on charts and radio in Sweden, peaking at number five on the Sverigetopplistan singles chart. The album was distributed abroad in the next two years with the single "Call My Name", which entered charts in Belgium and Germany.

In 2012, Styrke canceled a summer tour to take a break from music due to a burnout. In 2014, she returned with the EP Borderline and released her second studio album Kiddo the following year. The album was positively received by critics, who coined it as "feminist pop". Its second single, "Borderline", missed the charts, but received a platinum certification in Sweden. Styrke collaborated with producer Elof Loelv for her third studio album Sway (2018), for which the singer aimed to create songs with minimal production. The lead single, "Say My Name", received critical acclaim and was named the 91st-best-song of the 2010s decade by Rolling Stone. The album's second single, "Mistakes", was a top-fifty hit in Sweden, where it was certified gold.

In 2020, Styrke participated on the music reality television series Så mycket bättre. Her cover version of Lili & Susie's song "Bara du och jag" peaked at number 30 on the Swedish singles chart and was certified gold. The following year, she released the singles "Mood Swings" and "Start Walking". Her fourth studio album Hard, which was preceded by the singles "Show Me Love" and "Hardcore", was released in June 2022.

== Studio albums ==
List of studio albums, with selected details, chart positions and certifications
Title	Album details	Peak chart positions	Certifications
Title	Album details	SWE	Certifications
Tove Styrke	Released: 12 November 2010; Label: Sony Music; Formats: CD, digital download, streaming	10	GLF: Gold
Kiddo	Released: 8 June 2015; Label: RCA, Sony Music; Formats: CD, digital download, streaming, vinyl	14	
Sway	Released: 4 May 2018; Label: RCA, Sony Music; Formats: CD, digital download, streaming, vinyl	11	
Hard	Released: 3 June 2022; Label: RCA, Sony Music; Formats: Digital download, streaming	58	
I Thought This Story Wasn't About Me	Released: 6 November 2026; Label: Sony Music; Formats: Digital download, streaming	—	

== Extended plays ==
List of extended plays, with selected details
Title	EP details
Borderline	Released: 23 November 2014; Label: Sony Music; Format: Digital download, streaming
Så mycket bättre 2020 – Tolkningarna	Released: 21 December 2020; Label: Milkshake, Sony Music; Format: Digital download, streaming

== Singles ==
=== As lead artist ===
List of singles, with selected chart positions and certifications, showing year released and album name
Title	Year	Peak chart positions				Certifications	Album
Title	Year	SWE	BEL (FL)	GER	SWI	Certifications	Album
"Million Pieces"	2010	18	—	—	—		Tove Styrke
"White Light Moment"	2010	5	—	—	—	GLF: Gold	Tove Styrke
"High and Low"	2011	— (Note: "High and Low" did not enter the Sverigetopplistan singles chart, but peaked at number 31 on the DigiListan download chart.)	—	—	—	GLF: Gold	Tove Styrke
"Call My Name"	2011	28	— (Note: "Call My Name" did not enter the Ultratop chart, but peaked at number 56 on the Ultratip chart.)	48	— (Note: "Call My Name" did not enter the Swiss singles chart, but peaked at number 31 on the Swiss Airplay chart.)		Tove Styrke
"Brains Out" (with Caotico)	2011	—	—	—	—		Sunrise Confessions
"Bad Time for a Good Time" (featuring Gnucci Banana)	2012	—	—	—	—		Tove Styrke
"Even If I'm Loud It Doesn't Mean I'm Talking to You"	2014	—	—	—	—		Kiddo
"Borderline"	2014	—	—	—	— (Note: "Borderline" did not enter the Swiss singles chart, but peaked at number 74 on the Swiss Airplay chart.)	GLF: Platinum	Kiddo
"Ego"	2015	—	—	—	—		Kiddo
"Number One"	2015	—	—	—	—		Kiddo
"Say My Name"	2017	85	— (Note: "Say My Name" did not enter the Ultratop chart, but charted as an "extra tip" on the Ultratip chart.)	—	—		Sway
"Mistakes"	2017	42	—	—	—	GLF: Gold	Sway
"Changed My Mind"	2018	90	—	—	—		Sway
"On the Low"	2018	— (Note: "On the Low" did not enter the Sverigetopplistan singles chart, but peaked at number 12 on the Heatseeker chart.)	—	—	—		Sway
"Sway"	2018	— (Note: "Sway" did not enter the Sverigetopplistan singles chart, but peaked at number 4 on the Heatseeker chart.)	—	—	—		Sway
"Vibe"	2018	— (Note: "Vibe" did not enter the Sverigetopplistan singles chart, but peaked at number 10 on the Heatseeker chart.)	—	—	—		Sway
"Love Me Back" (with Ritual)	2019	—	—	—	—		Non-album single
"Bara du och jag"	2020	30	—	—	—	GLF: Gold	Så mycket bättre 2020 – Tolkningarna
"Mood Swings"	2021	62	—	—	—		Non-album single
"All Things $ Can Do" (with Cheat Codes and Travis Barker)	2021	— (Note: "All Things $ Can Do" did not enter the Sverigetopplistan singles chart, but peaked at number 14 on the Heatseeker chart.)	—	—	—		Hellraisers, Pt. 2
"Start Walking"	2021	79	—	—	—		Hard
"Show Me Love"	2022	93	—	—	—		Hard
"Hardcore"	2022	— (Note: "Hardcore" did not enter the Sverigetopplistan singles chart, but peaked at number 8 on the Heatseeker chart.)	—	—	—		Hard
"YouYouYou"	2022	—	—	—	—		Hard
"Another Broken Heart"	2022	—	—	—	—		Hard
"Prayer"	2026	—	—	—	—		I Thought This Story Wasn't About Me
"Space"	2026	—	—	—	—		I Thought This Story Wasn't About Me
"Song and Dance Man"	2026	—	—	—	—		I Thought This Story Wasn't About Me
"Let's Go Camping"	2026	—	—	—	—		I Thought This Story Wasn't About Me
"Sunflower"	2026	—	—	—	—		I Thought This Story Wasn't About Me
"Me/You (Always and Forever)"	2026	—	—	—	—		I Thought This Story Wasn't About Me
"—" denotes a recording that did not chart.

=== As featured artist ===
List of singles, with selected chart positions, showing year released and album name
Title	Year	Peak chart positions	Album
Title	Year	SWE	Album
"Aftergold" (Big Wild featuring Tove Styrke)	2016	—	Non-album single
"Andas" (Linnea Henriksson featuring Tove Styrke)	2017	—	Linnea Henriksson
"Endless" (VAX featuring Tove Styrke)	2018	76	Non-album single
"Stuck" (Lost Kings featuring Tove Styrke)	2018	58	Paper Crowns
"Been There Done That" (NOTD featuring Tove Styrke)	2018	69	Non-album single
"Talk to Me" Cosmo's Midnight featuring Tove Styrke)	2018	—	What Comes Next
"—" denotes a recording that did not chart.

=== Promotional singles ===
List of singles, with selected chart positions, showing year issued and album name
Title	Year	Peak chart positions	Album
Title	Year	SWE	Album
"...Baby One More Time"	2015	—	Non-album single
"Liability (Demo)"	2017	—	Sway
"Fyll upp mitt glas nu"	2020	— (Note: "Fyll upp mitt glas nu" did not enter the Sverigetopplistan singles chart, but peaked at number 2 on the Heatseeker chart.)	Så mycket bättre 2020 – Tolkningarna
"Varje sår söker ett sår"	2020	—	Så mycket bättre 2020 – Tolkningarna
"—" denotes a recording that did not chart.

== Other charted songs ==
List of songs, with chart positions, showing year released and album name
Title	Year	Peak chart positions	Album
Title	Year	SWE	Album
"In the Ghetto" (live)	2009	35	Non-album songs
"I Wish I Was a Punkrocker" (live)	2009	29	Non-album songs
"Himlen är oskyldigt blå" (live)	2009	29	Non-album songs
"Pride (In the Name of Love)" (live)	2009	56	Non-album songs
"The Greatest Love of All" (live)	2009	49	Non-album songs
"Can't Get You Out of My Head" (live)	2009	— (Note: "Can't Get You Out of My Head" did not enter the Sverigetopplistan singles chart, but peaked at number 60 on the DigiListan download chart.)	Non-album songs
"Hot n Cold" (live)	2009	58	Det bästa från Idol 2009
"Good Vibes" (Alma featuring Tove Styrke)	2018	91	Heavy Rules Mixtape
"—" denotes a recording that did not chart.

== Guest appearances ==
List of guest appearances, solo or with other performing artists, showing year released and album name
Title	Year	Other performer(s)	Album	Ref.
"Hot n Cold"	2009	—N/a	Det bästa från Idol 2009	
"Brains Out"	2012	Caotico	Sunrise Confessions	
"Landet"	2016	Marit Bergman	Molnfabriken	
"Andas"	2017	Linnea Henriksson	Linnea Henriksson	
"Good Vibes"	2018	Alma	Heavy Rules Mixtape	
"Last Goodbye"	2018	Clean Bandit and Stefflon Don	What Is Love?	
"Stuck"	2019	Lost Kings	Paper Crowns	
"All Things $ Can Do"	2021	Cheat Codes and Travis Barker	Hellraisers, Pt. 2	

== Music videos ==
List of music videos, showing year released and directors
Title	Year	Director(s)	Ref.
"High and Low"	2011	Christian Coinbergh	
"Brains Out" (with Caotico)	2011	Caotico	
"Call My Name"	2011	Mats Udd	
"Bad Time for a Good Time" (featuring Gnucci Banana)	2012	Unknown	
"Even If I'm Loud It Doesn't Mean I'm Talking to You"	2014	Slobodan Zivic	
"Borderline"	2014	Rúnar Ingi	
"Ego"	2015	Rúnar Ingi	
"Number One"	2015	Marcus Lundin	
"...Baby One More Time"	2015	Rikkard Häggbom	
"Aftergold" (Big Wild featuring Tove Styrke)	2016	Vern Moen	
"Say My Name"	2017	Daniel Skoglund	
"Mistakes"	2017	Joanna Nordahl	
"Liability (Demo)"	2018	Lisa Hultengren	
"On the Low" (lyric video)	2018	Lisa Hultengren	
"Sway"	2018	Joanna Nordahl	
"Love Me Back" (with Ritual)	2019	Stylewar	
"Mood Swings"	2021	Gustav Stegfors	
"Start Walking"	2021	Oskar Gullstrand	
"Show Me Love"	2022	Oskar Gullstrand; Tove Berglund	
"YouYouYou"	2022	Cornelia Wahlberg	
