= Borderline (EP) =

EP by Tove Styrke
- Released: 23 November 2014
- Genre: Pop; Alternative music
- Label: Sony Music Entertainment

Tove Styrke chronology
Tove Styrke (2010)	Borderline (2014)	Kiddo (2015)

Borderline is an extended play (EP) by Swedish pop recording artist Tove Styrke. It is her first release internationally outside of Europe.

== Track listing ==
Digital download
No.	Title	Writer(s)	Length
1.	"Borderline"	Tove Styrke, Jan Kask	3:24
2.	"Samurai Boy"	Tove Styrke, Jan Kask	3:29
3.	"Brag"	Tove Styrke, Christian Walz	3:52
4.	"Even If I'm Loud It Doesn't Mean I'm Talking to You"	Tove Styrke, Carl Ask	3:06
5.	"Walking a Line"	Tove Styrke, Jan Kask	3:51
6.	"Borderline (Salvatore Ganacci Remix)"	Tove Styrke, Jan Kask, Salvatore Ganacci	3:00

iTunes bonus tracks
No.	Title	Length
7.	"Borderline" (Music video)	3:35
