= Million Pieces =

2010 debut single by Tove Styrke

Single by Tove Styrke

from the album Tove Styrke
- Released: 25 June 2010
- Length: 3:39
- Label: Sony Music
- Songwriters: Adam Olenius; Lykke Li
- Producers: Lotus; 2manyfreckles

Tove Styrke singles chronology
"Million Pieces" (2010)	"White Light Moment" (2010)

"Million Pieces" is a song by Swedish singer Tove Styrke from her debut studio album, Tove Styrke (2010). It was released as Styrke's debut single on 25 June 2010 through Sony Music. The song peaked at number 18 on the Sverigetopplistan singles chart.

== Background ==
After finishing third on the sixth season of Idol in December 2009, Tove Styrke stepped out of the spotlight. In May 2010, Aftonbladet revealed she had begun recording her debut studio album with Sony Music. The song "Million Pieces", written by Adam Olenius of Swedish indie pop band Shout Out Louds and singer-songwriter Lykke Li, was chosen as her debut single. Lotus and 2manyfreckles produced the track, while Anders Hvenare handled mixing. In an interview for Aftonbladet, Styrke described the song as "kind" compared to other "crazy" album tracks.

"Million Pieces" was announced as the first single from her then-forthcoming debut album Tove Styrke (2010) on 22 June 2010 via a press release issued by the label. A snippet of the song was also uploaded to YouTube and the full song premiered on Sveriges Radio P3 on the same date. Sony Music made the single available for digital download on 25 June 2010, followed by a CD single release on 30 June. At the time of the song's release, Styrke said "The most important thing has been that I really love the music. I have not created music that others expect or to please anyone. This is music I stand behind to 100%." A remixed by Swedish producer Familjen was released on 20 August 2010.

== Track listing ==
- CD single / digital download
1. "Million Pieces" – 3:39
- Digital download
1. "Million Pieces" (Familjen remix) – 4:30

== Credits and personnel ==
Credits are adapted from the Tove Styrke liner notes.

- Adam Olenius – songwriting
- Lykke Li – songwriting
- Lotus – production
- 2manyfreckles – production
- Anders Hvenare – mixing

== Chart performance ==
Chart performance for "Million Pieces"
Chart (2010)	Peak position
Sweden (Sverigetopplistan)	18

== Release history ==
Release dates and formats for "Million Pieces"
Country	Date	Format	Label	Ref.
Sweden	25 June 2010	Digital download	Sony Music	
Sweden	30 June 2010	CD single	Sony Music	
Sweden	20 August 2010	Digital download (remix)	Sony Music	
