= Det snurrar i min skalle =

Single by Familjen

from the album Det snurrar i min skalle
- Released: 2007 (Sweden) (Norway) (Denmark); 2008 (Australia)
- Genre: Indie rock/Techno, Electronica
- Length: 4 min 15 s
- Label: (Sweden) Adrian Recordings / Hybris (Norway) Tellé (Denmark) A:Larm (Australia) Creative Vibes
- Songwriter: Johan T. Karlsson
- Producer: Johan T. Karlsson

Familjen singles chronology
"'Kom säger dom'" (2007)	"Det snurrar i min skalle" (2007)	"'Huvudet i sanden'" (2007)

"Det snurrar i min skalle" (Swedish: [ˈdeː ˈsnɵ̂rːar iː mɪn ˈskâlːɛ], "It's spinning in my head") is a single from Swedish indie-techno outfit Familjen from the 2007 album Det snurrar i min skalle. It was released in 2007 under various labels including Adrian Recordings and Hybris in Sweden, Telle in Norway, A:Larm in Denmark, and Creative Vibes in Australia.

== Video ==
The video was named by Pitchfork Media as one of the best music videos of 2007. It also won a Grammi award in Sweden for Music Video of the Year.

== Charts ==
The single listed for 14 weeks on the Denmark Singles Top 40. It entered the chart on position 38 in the 47th week of 2007, its last appearance was in the 18th week of 2008. It peaked at number 21, where it stayed for 1 week.

In May 2008, Australia's national radio station Triple J put the single on its "Hit List" (songs on med-high rotation). The song also finished the year as the third most played song on the station.

Chart (2007/2008)	Peak position
Sweden Singles Chart	-
Norway Singles Chart	-
Denmark Singles Top 40	21
Australia Singles Chart	-
