= Boeoes Kaelstigen =

Musical group

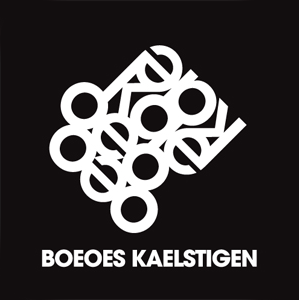
- Boeoes Kaelstigen Logotype.

Background information
- Origin: Sweden
- Genres: Minimal techno Electronic; Electronica; Techno
- Years active: 2007 – present
- Labels: Adrian Recordings, Koloni, Scion Audio Visual
- Members: Tor Rauden Källstigen; Leo Nathorst-Böös
- Website: Official site

Boeoes Kaelstigen /ˈbʌs ˈtʃɛlstɪɡɛn/ is a techno group consisting of Leo Nathorst-Böös and Tor Rauden Källstigen. Well known for their minimalistic techno with influences from trance. Besides Boeoes Kaelstigen's own releases, they've done several remixes for artists such as Familjen, Tove Styrke, Seinabo Sey, Duvchi, Jonathan Johansson, Firefox AK and Andreas Tilliander.

== History ==
Tor and Leo first met on a class in rhetoric and quickly discovered their similar taste in music, their love for Giorgio Moroder, futuristic trains and machines that goes beep.

When the two, by coincidence, moved into the same apartment complex, sweet noises emerged, echoing over the hills of Ersta in the very beginning of 2007.

The project soon came to be known as Boeoes Kaelstigen, based on how the two participants complicated family names were spelled by airline carriers.

After just a few weeks, Fasit, the duo's first track had already received thousands of plays on Myspace, support from a number of DJ's from all over the world and was picked up by Swedish National Radio, and various stations in Australia, the UK, Estonia and South Africa among others.

The duo has been endorsed by international techno personas such as Laurent Garnier, Michael Mayer of Kompakt and Özgur Can.

== Relationship with the media ==
Boeoes Kaelstigen rarely cooperate with the media or the mainstream music scene. Until 2007, they did not perform live concerts.

== Live concerts ==
Since the very beginning of this project, the duo has played all over the world, including popular venues in Tokyo, Copenhagen, Berlin, Paris and Helsinki.

== Discography ==
=== Albums ===
- Overcomes Love, Time & Space (2015). Adrian Recordings.
- Tanum Teleport (2010). Adrian Recordings.

=== EP's ===
- Commuting Colour (2008). Adrian Recordings.
- Toppola (2008). Koloni.
- Pan European (2007). Adrian Recordings.

=== Singles ===
- Our Story (feat. Vanbot) (2014). Adrian Recordings.
- Be the Lights (feat. Name the Pet) (2014). Adrian Recordings.
- Kantillo (2011). Adrian Recordings.
- Lou (2010). Adrian Recordings.
- Desolate View (feat. Stefan Storm) (2010). Adrian Recordings.
