= Malmros =

Malmros may refer to:

- Nils Malmros
- Ted Malmros
