= Work (album) =

Studio album by Shout Out Louds
- Released: 23 February 2010
- Recorded: August and October 2009
- Studios: • Bear Creek Studio, Seattle, WA; • Decibel Studio, Stockholm; • Dubious Studio, Stockholm
- Genres: Indie pop, indie rock
- Length: 41:24
- Labels: Merge Records (US), Vertigo (Europe)
- Producer: Phil Ek

Shout Out Louds chronology
Our Ill Wills (2007)	Work (2010)	Optica (2013)

Work is the third studio album by Swedish indie rock band Shout Out Louds. It was released in the United States and Canada on 23 February 2010, in Scandinavia on 24 February 2010 and in Germany, Australia, Switzerland, and Austria on 26 February 2010. The album was preceded by 2007's Our Ill Wills. The first single off of Work was "Walls", which was released as a free MP3 download through the band's website. The second single, "Fall Hard", was made available as free streaming audio on the band's MySpace website over a month before the album's release.

Work is the band's third full-length release. It was produced by Phil Ek, the producer of Fleet Foxes' eponymous debut album, Band of Horses' Cease to Begin, and The Shins' Chutes Too Narrow and Wincing the Night Away. Merge Records, the label on which the album is being distributed in North America, describes the album as "strip[ping] away the bells and whistles of previous efforts".

== Critical reception ==
Professional ratings
Aggregate scores
Source	Rating
Metacritic	68/100
Review scores
Source	Rating
AllMusic	4/5 stars
The A.V. Club	(B+)
Pitchfork	(5.4/10)
Popdose	(very favorable)
PopMatters	8/10 stars
Prefix	7/10 stars
Rolling Stone	3/5 stars
Slant	2.5/5 stars

Upon its release, Work received mixed reviews, with some commentators criticizing it as "bland" and "risk-averse" and others praising it for having "a distinct sound and identity" and "great energy".

== Track listing ==
No.	Title	Length
1.	"1999"	4:41
2.	"Fall Hard"	4:15
3.	"Play the Game"	4:03
4.	"Walls"	3:20
5.	"Candle Burned Out"	5:09
6.	"Throwing Stones"	3:37
7.	"Four By Four"	4:01
8.	"Paper Moon"	4:14
9.	"Show Me Something New"	3:26
10.	"Too Late, Too Slow"	4:35
Total length:		41:24

== Chart positions ==
Chart (2010)	Peak
Billboard 200	200
Swedish Albums Chart	21
