= High and Low (Tove Styrke song) =

2011 single by Tove Styrke

Single by Tove Styrke

from the album Tove Styrke
- Released: 25 February 2011
- Length: 3:31
- Label: Sony Music
- Songwriters: Tove Styrke; Fredrik Berger; Patrik Berger
- Producer: Patrik Berger

Tove Styrke singles chronology
"White Light Moment" (2010)	"High and Low" (2011)	"Call My Name" (2011)

"High and Low" is a song by Swedish singer Tove Styrke from her debut studio album, Tove Styrke (2010). It was released as the album's third single on 25 February 2011 through Sony Music. Styrke wrote the song with Fredrik Berger and Patrik Berger. The song did not enter the Sverigetopplistan singles chart, but peaked at number 31 on the DigiListan download chart.

== Background ==
"High and Low" was written by Tove Styrke, Fredrik Berger, and Patrik Berger for Styrke's debut studio album, Tove Styrke (2010). The song was released as the album's third single on 25 February 2011 through Sony Music. A digital extended play (EP) with a 2011 remake of the song and five remixes were included on the release. Swedish duo Boeoes Kaelstigen contributed a minimal techno remix to the EP.

== Reception ==
Kajsa Lindström of Sydsvenskan named "High and Low" the best track on Tove Styrke. Anders Sandlund from Piteå-Tidningen regarded it one of the album's highlights.

"High and Low" did not enter the Sverigetopplistan singles chart. The song peaked at number 31 on the DigiListan chart.

== Music video ==
The accompanying black-and-white music video for the 2011 remake of "High and Low" premiered on 25 March 2011. The video was directed by Christian Coinbergh.

== Track listing ==
- Digital EP
1. "High and Low" (2011 remake) − 3:31
2. "High and Low" (Boeoes Kaelstigen remix) − 5:00
3. "High and Low" (Boeoes Kaelstigen remix radio edit) − 3:14
4. "High and Low" (Juuso Pikanen remix) − 3:51
5. "High and Low" (Tomi Kiiosk Remikksi) − 4:57
6. "High and Low" (Umeå remake) − 5:22

== Credits and personnel ==
Credits are adapted from the Tove Styrke liner notes.

- Tove Styrke – songwriting
- Patrik Berger – songwriting, production
- Fredrik Berger – songwriting

== Charts ==
Chart performance for "High and Low"
Chart (2011)	Peak position
Sweden (DigiListan)	31

== Certifications ==
Certifications for "High and Low"
Region	Certification	Certified units/sales
Sweden (GLF)	Gold	20,000^{‡}
^{‡} Sales+streaming figures based on certification alone.

== Release history ==
Release dates and formats for "High and Low"
Country	Date	Format	Version	Label	Ref.
Various	25 February 2011	Digital download; streaming	2011 remake	Sony Music	
Sweden	29 April 2011	Radio airplay	2011 remake	Sony Music	
