= Borderline (Tove Styrke song) =

2014 song by Tove Styrke

Single by Tove Styrke

from the album Kiddo
- Released: 9 October 2014
- Genre: Electropop
- Length: 3:23
- Label: Sony Music
- Songwriters: Tove Styrke; Janne Kask
- Producer: Johan T. Karlsson

Tove Styrke singles chronology
"Even If I'm Loud It Doesn't Mean I'm Talking to You" (2014)	"Borderline" (2014)	"Ego" (2015)

Music video
- "Borderline" on YouTube

"Borderline" is a song by Swedish singer Tove Styrke from her second studio album, Kiddo (2015). The song was released as the album's second single on 9 October 2014 through Sony Music. It is also included on the EP Borderline (2014). Styrke and Janne Kask wrote the song, with production by Johan T. Karlsson. "Borderline" is an electropop song.

== Background ==
Six months prior to its release, "Borderline" appeared in remixed form by Henning Fürst on a compilation album created as part of the election campaign of Swedish political party Feminist Initiative in April 2014. The official version of the track premiered on Sveriges Radio P3 on 8 October 2014; it was also uploaded to Styrke's SoundCloud account. Sony Music released "Borderline" for digital download and streaming the following day.

== Composition and lyrics ==
"Borderline" is a three-minute and 23-second electropop song with reggae influences. Nolan Feeney of Time described Styrke's vocal style as an "adopted patois".

== Reception ==
"Borderline" received critical acclaim. Mellanie Battolla of The Line of Best Fit wrote that the single established Styrke as "a shape-shifting pop singer that can ease herself in all music genres".

"Borderline" did not enter the Sverigetopplistan singles chart, but received a platinum certification by the Swedish Recording Industry Association (GLF), indicating sales of 40,000 units.

== Music video ==
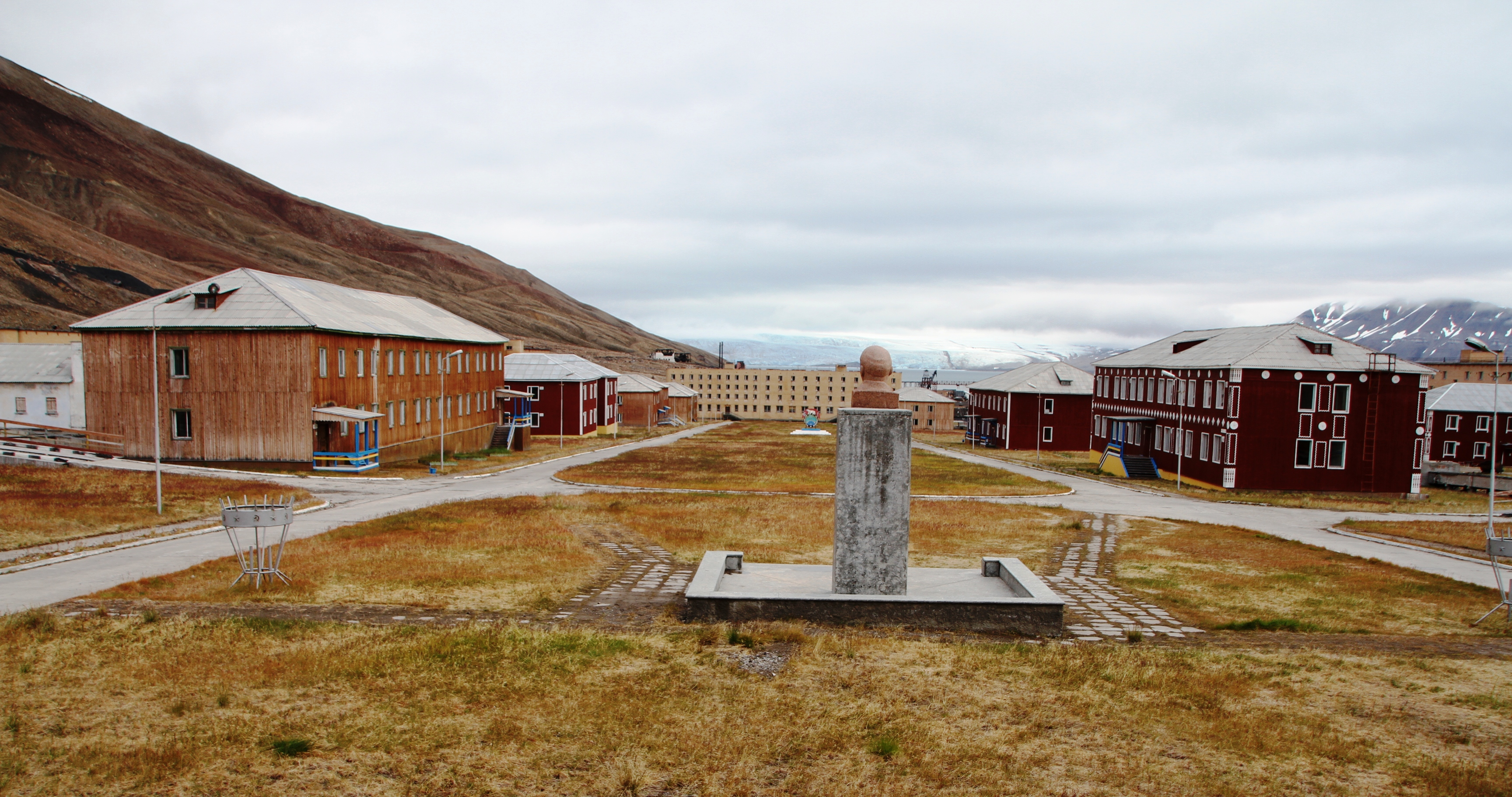
The music video for "Borderline" was filmed in Pyramiden, Svalbard.

Icelandic filmmaker Rúnar Ingi directed the accompanying music video for "Borderline". It was filmed on location in the former mining settlement Pyramiden on the Norwegian archipelago of Svalbard.

== Track listing ==
- Digital single
1. "Borderline" – 3:23
- Digital single
1. "Borderline" (Salvatore Ganacci remix) – 3:00
- Digital single
1. "Borderline" (Dan Lissvik remix) – 4:08
- Digital single
1. "Borderline" (Vanic remix) – 4:16

== Credits and personnel ==
Credits are adapted from the Kiddo liner notes.

- Tove Styrke – songwriting
- Janne Kask – songwriting
- Johan T. Karlsson – production, mixing
- Tom Coyne – mastering

== Charts ==
Chart performance for "Borderline"
Chart (2015)	Peak position
Switzerland Airplay (Swiss Hitparade)	74

== Certifications ==
Certifications for "Borderline"
Region	Certification	Certified units/sales
Sweden (GLF)	Platinum	40,000^{‡}
^{‡} Sales+streaming figures based on certification alone.

== Release history ==
Release dates and formats for "Borderline"
Country	Date	Format	Version	Label	Ref.
Various	9 October 2014	Digital download; streaming	Original	Sony Music	
Sweden	16 October 2014	Radio airplay	Original	Sony Music	
Various	18 November 2014	Digital download; streaming	Salvatore Ganacci remix	Sony Music	
Various	14 December 2014	Digital download; streaming	Dan Lissvik remix	Sony Music	
Various	1 April 2015	Digital download; streaming	Vanic remix	Sony Music	

== Ely Oaks and Lavinia version ==
"Borderline"

Single by Ely Oaks and Lavinia
- Released: 24 April 2025
- Length: 1:58
- Label: Jinx
- Songwriters: Janne Kask; Tove Styrke
- Producers: Ely Oaks; Sebastian Bliem

Ely Oaks singles chronology
"No Regrets" (2025)	"Borderline" (2025)	"I Wanna Go" (2025)

Lavinia singles chronology
"Canyons" (2025)	"Borderline" (2025)	"I Wanna Go" (2025)

Music video
- "Borderline" on YouTube

Austrian music producer Ely Oaks and German-based artist Lavinia Hope released their version on 24 April 2025 by Jinx Music. It went viral and spent several weeks into the charts of several countries, reaching number 17 on the German chart dated 16 May 2025. It also ranked third among the most listened songs by German artists on Spotify during the first half of 2025.

=== Track listing ===
- Digital download and streaming
1. "Borderline" – 1:58
- Digital download and streaming – remixes
1. "Borderline" (Angrybaby remix) – 2:14
2. "Borderline" (Jkyl & Hyde remix) – 2:12
3. "Borderline" (Avello remix) – 2:35
4. "Borderline" – 1:58

=== Charts ===
==== Weekly charts ====
Weekly chart performance for "Borderline"
Chart (2025)	Peak position
Austria (Ö3 Austria Top 40)	12
Czech Republic Singles Digital (ČNS IFPI)	22
Germany (GfK)	17
Germany Dance (GfK)	1
Ireland (IRMA)	52
Netherlands (Single Top 100)	84
Norway (VG-lista)	69
Poland (Polish Streaming Top 100)	40
Slovakia Singles Digital (ČNS IFPI)	50
Sweden (Sverigetopplistan)	42
Switzerland (Schweizer Hitparade)	73
UK Singles (OCC)	35
UK Dance (OCC)	8
UK Indie (OCC)	7

==== Year-end charts ====
Year-end chart performance for "Borderline"
Chart (2025)	Position
Austria (Ö3 Austria Top 40)	65

=== Certifications ===
Certifications and sales for "Borderline"
Region	Certification	Certified units/sales
Belgium (BRMA)	Gold	20,000^{‡}
^{‡} Sales+streaming figures based on certification alone.
