= Familjen =

Swedish singer and record producer (born 1976)

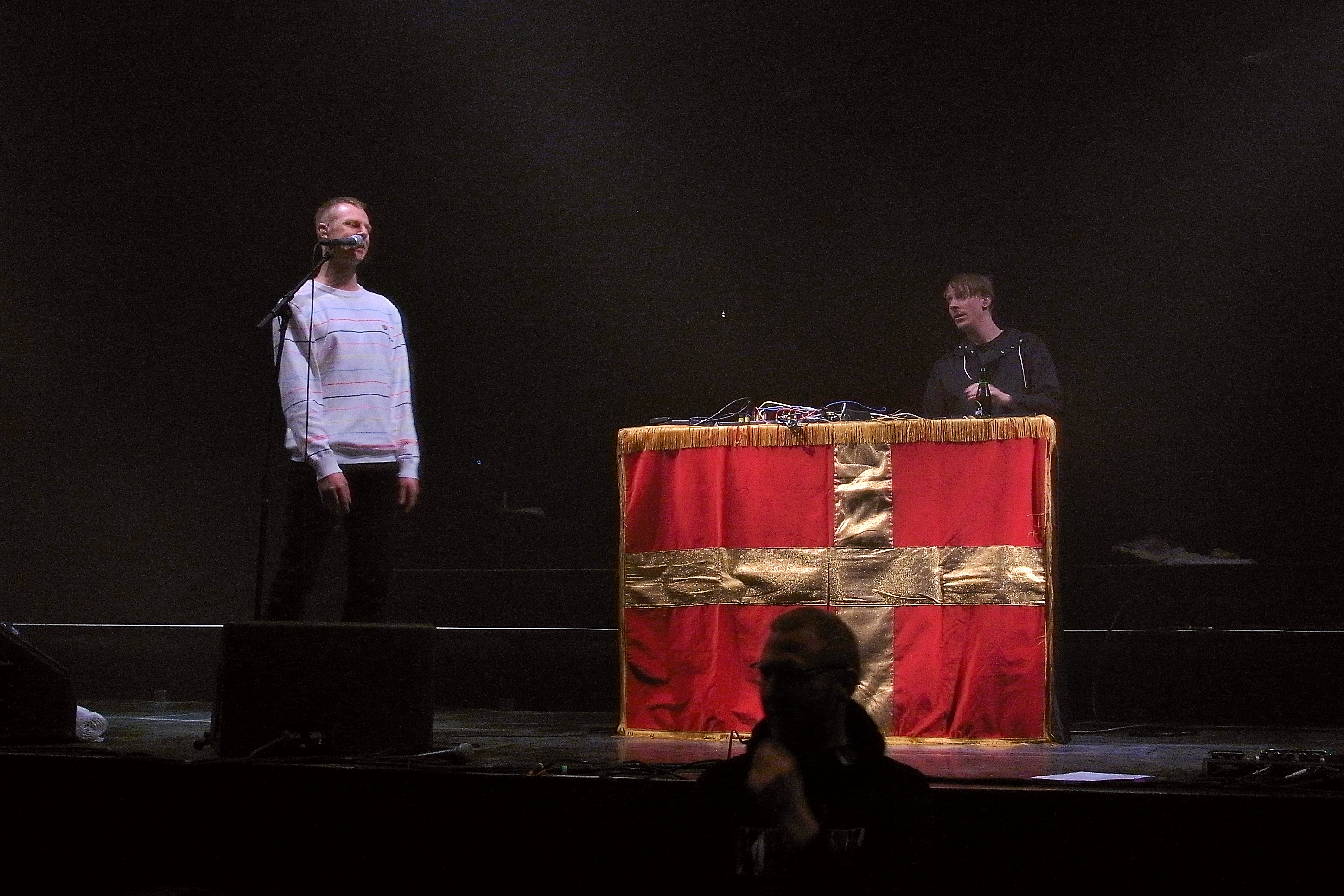
- Familjen on stage, March 2008.

Background information
- Origin: Hässleholm, Skåne, Sweden
- Genres: Electronica, Techno, Indie
- Years active: 2006–present
- Labels: Adrian Recordings / Hybris (Sweden); Tellé (Norway); A:Larm (Denmark); Creative Vibes (Australia)
- Members: Johan T Karlsson
- Website: familj-en.com

Johan Tommy Karlsson (born April 10, 1976 in Hässleholm) is a Swedish techno/electropop artist who uses the alias Familjen (Swedish: [faˈmɪ̌lːjɛn], "The Family").

== Biography ==
Karlsson grew up in Hässleholm, Skåne (the same town as fellow electronica producers Andreas Tilliander and Stefan Thor (Folie)), but is currently based in Malmö. In his youth as a synthpop fan he also formed bands with Sophie Rimheden from nearby Bjärnum and joined the industrial act Morticians with Stefan Thor and Andreas Rimheden. Karlsson has previously produced Swedish indie band David & the Citizens.

Karlsson describes his music as indie-techno:

"I'm pretty fed up with guitar - Indie and techno can get a bit monotone after a while."

All his lyrics are in Swedish, or the southern dialect of Scanian to be more precise. He performs live with Andreas Tilliander on synthesizer.

Both the album and the single Det snurrar i min skalle are released on Tellé in Norway, the same label as Röyksopp, Annie and Kings Of Convenience. Creative Vibes Recordings released the album in Australia in 2008.

In October 2007 Familjen won the Swedish web-based music competition Rampmusic (competitions were also held in Norway and Denmark). Some unexpected help came from the file sharing community The Pirate Bay, who on their website encouraged their visitors to vote for him (without Karlsson's knowledge).

Both music videos directed by Karlsson feature a previously shown image overlaid with a hand-drawn heart for the last few seconds.

In 2015 he produced the ...Baby One More Time-single by the Swedish singer Tove Styrke, a cover of Britney Spears's hit song released in 1998.

== Discography ==
=== Albums ===
- 2007: Det snurrar i min skalle
- 2008: Huvudet i sanden
- 2010: Mänskligheten
- 2012: Allt På Rött
- 2018: Kom

=== EP ===
- 2006: Familjen EP on Adrian Recordings

=== Singles ===
- 2006: "Första/Sista" on Adrian Recordings
- 2006: "Hög luft" on Adrian Recordings / Hybris
- 2007: "Kom säger dom" on Adrian Recordings / Hybris
- 2007: "Det snurrar i min skalle" on Adrian Recordings / Hybris / A:Larm (Denmark) / Tellé (Norway) / Creative Vibes (Australia)
- 2007: "Huvudet i sanden" on Adrian Recordings / Hybris / Tellé
- 2010: "När planeterna stannat" on Adrian Recordings / Hybris

Others

- 2014: Göra slut med gud (from Så mycket bättre - Season 5 - Ola Salo Day)
- 2014: Regn hos mig (from Så mycket bättre - Season 5 - Orup Day)

=== Videos ===
- 2007: "Det snurrar i min skalle" (English translation: "My mind is spinning") Directed by Johan Söderberg. The video was named by Pitchfork Media as one of the best videos of 2007. It also won a grammy in Sweden for best video.
- 2007: "Huvudet i sanden" (English translation: "Head in the sand") Directed by Johan Söderberg. Pitchfork Media said the video was "one of the most inspired and rewatchable videos of 2007".
- 2010: "Det var jag" (English translation: "It was me") Directed by Mats Udd. Nominated to the best Scandinavian music video by the Bergen International Film Festival in Norway.
- 2012: "Vi va dom" Directed by Mats Udd.

== See also ==
- Andreas Tilliander
- Sophie Rimheden
