= Sophie Rimheden =

Swedish electronica artist

- Born: 24 March 1975 (age 50)
- Origin: Bjärnum, Sweden
- Genres: Pop, dance, electronica, experimental music
- Years active: 1999–present
- Labels: SRP
- Website: Sophie Rimheden Productions

Sophie Rimheden (born 24 March 1975) is a Swedish electronica artist who has had releases on the North of No South Records, Memento Materia and other various record labels during her career.

== Background ==
Born in Bjärnum, Sweden, she began making music as a child and moved into electronic music at age 13. She was part of the 1990s electronica scene in Hässleholm, which formed a number of Swedish artists. She has stated she is heavily influenced by Madonna. She's lived in Stockholm since 1999.

== Early career ==
Rimheden released her first album Underneath The Floor in 1999 under the name Hayce. She collaborated with various guest musicians. Over the next few years she contributed songs to various compilation albums, including "Don't Follow" (2001) on Electric Ladyland (as Sophie Rimheden), "Cadillac" (as Hayce, 2002) for Circle o and "Food" (as Ban Ham, 2003) on Nattskift. In 2003, she released her first album under her own name, Hi-Fi on Mitek. A mixture of IDM, distorted disco, and electro-bleep-funk, the album was a critical success in her homeland, winning the Manifest Prize for the best Postrock/Electronica album of 2003, as well as receiving several Swedish music industry nominations. The track "In Your Mind" was notable for sampling the bassline from the Bananarama classic "Cruel Summer".

== Continuing success ==
Further contributions to compilations continued through 2004 and 2005 as well as the distribution of several free mp3 singles. An EP "Into Night' in 2004 feature four new tracks and was followed by her second album Miss on Svedjebruk. Later in 2004, she covered the Tears for Fears hit "Shout" with Håkan Lidbo, which was released as a single. She teamed up with Lidbo again in 2005 to record the 1980s track "Framling" for the various artists album Alla Tiders Melodifestival, a cover album of Swedish Eurovision Song Contest entries over the years. She set up her own record company SRP (Sophie Rimheden Productions) and in 2005 released her third album Sophie Rimheden. It featured three singles "Can You Save Me?", featuring Annika Holmberg, "Queen of the Night" and "Days Go By", featuring Marit Bergman. She released her fourth album, Traveller, on 14 April 2008.
