= Tove Styrke (album) =

Studio album by Tove Styrke
- Released: 12 November 2010
- Recorded: 2010
- Genre: Electropop
- Length: 40:58
- Label: Sony Music
- Producers: Peter Ågren; Patrik Berger; Stefan Gräslund; Jan Kask; Paw Lagermann; Lotus; 2manyfreckles

Tove Styrke chronology
| Tove Styrke (2010) | Kiddo (2015) |

Singles from Tove Styrke
- 1. "Million Pieces" Released: 9 July 2010; 2. "White Light Moment" Released: 19 November 2010; 3. "High and Low" Released: 25 February 2011; 4. "Call My Name" Released: 22 August 2011; 5. "Bad Time for a Good Time" Released: 25 February 2012

Tove Styrke is the debut studio album by Swedish electropop singer Tove Styrke. The album was released on 12 November 2010 on Sony Music. It debuted at number 21 in Swedish charts and went up to 10th place in its second week. Most tracks have been written by Tove Styrke, Patrik Berger, Peter Ågren and Janne Kask. On 10 October 2011, the album was re-released with the new single "Call My Name" and a 2011 remake of "High and Low". After promoting and releasing the single "Call My Name" across Europe, the album got reissued another time.

== Track listing ==
Standard edition
| No. | Title | Writer(s) | Producer(s) | Length |
|---|---|---|---|---|
| 1. | "Beating on a Better Drum" | Tove Styrke; Fredrik Berger; Patrik Berger | P. Berger | 4:13 |
| 2. | "Stalker in Your Speaker" | F. Berger; P. Berger | P. Berger | 3:07 |
| 3. | "High and Low" | Styrke; F. Berger; P. Berger | P. Berger | 3:44 |
| 4. | "Million Pieces" | Adam Olenius; Lykke Li | Lotus; 2manyfreckles | 3:41 |
| 5. | "Chaos" | Styrke; Noonie Bao | Lotus; 2manyfreckles | 4:36 |
| 6. | "Bad Time for a Good Time" | F. Berger; P. Berger | P. Berger | 3:11 |
| 7. | "Close Enough" | Styrke; Jan Kask; Peter Ågren | Ågren; Kask | 3:49 |
| 8. | "Love You and Leave You" | Paw Lagermann | Lagermann | 3:10 |
| 9. | "Four Elements" | Styrke; Bao | Lotus; 2manyfreckles | 3:50 |
| 10. | "Walking My Daydream" | Styrke; Kask; Ågren | Ågren; Kask | 3:52 |
| 11. | "White Light Moment" | Styrke; Ågren; Kask | Ågren; Kask | 3:42 |

Digital bonus track
| No. | Title | Length |
|---|---|---|
| 12. | "Million Pieces" (Yamaha PSS-31 Version) | 4:06 |

2011 re-release
| No. | Title | Writer(s) | Producer(s) | Length |
|---|---|---|---|---|
| 1. | "Call My Name" | Styrke; Ågren; Kask | Ågren; Kask | 3:41 |
| 4. | "High and Low" (2011 version) | | | 3:44 |

2012 re-release
| No. | Title | Writer(s) | Producer(s) | Length |
|---|---|---|---|---|
| 1. | "Call My Name" | | | 3:41 |
| 2. | "Beating on a Better Drum" | | | 4:13 |
| 3. | "Million Pieces" (2012 version) | | | 3:26 |
| 4. | "High and Low" (2011 version) | | | 3:44 |
| 5. | "White Light Moment" | | | 3:42 |
| 6. | "Sticks and Stones" | Victoria Hesketh; Stefan Gräslund | Gräslund | 4:03 |
| 7. | "Bad Time for a Good Time" | | | 3:11 |
| 8. | "Close Enough" | | | 3:49 |
| 9. | "Love You and Leave You" | | | 3:10 |
| 10. | "Stalker in Your Speaker" | | | 3:07 |
| 11. | "Chaos" | | | 4:36 |

2012 Amazon bonus track
| No. | Title | Length |
|---|---|---|
| 12. | "Walking My Daydream" | 3:52 |

iTunes Bonus Content
| No. | Title | Length |
|---|---|---|
| 12. | "Four Elements" | 3:50 |
| 13. | "Bad Time for a Good Time" (featuring Gnucci Banana) | 3:08 |
| 14. | "Call My Name" (JRMX Radio Edit) | 3:44 |
| 15. | "Call My Name" (Cashmere Cat Remix) | 6:30 |
| 16. | "Call My Name" (Instrumental) | 3:42 |
| 17. | "High and Low" (Taped Remix) | 6:16 |
| 18. | "High and Low" (Video) | 3:40 |
| 19. | "Call My Name" (Video) | 3:42 |
| 20. | "Call My Name" (Making of video) | 4:24 |

== Release history ==
| Country | Date | Label | Format | Edition |
|---|---|---|---|---|
| Various | 12 November 2010 | Sony Music | Digital download | Standard edition |
| Europe | 10 October 2011 | Sony Music | Digital download | New version |
| Sweden | 9 November 2010 | Sony Music | CD | Standard edition |
| Sweden | 12 October 2011 | Sony Music | CD | New version |
| Germany | 23 March 2012 | Sony Music | CD, digital download | 2012 edition |
| United Kingdom | 3 April 2012 | Sony Music | CD | 2012 edition |

== Singles ==
- The first single "Million Pieces" was released on 9 July 2010. It has been written by Adam Olenius from Shout Out Louds and Lykke Li.
- The second single, "White Light Moment", was released on 19 November 2011. It charted at number five on the Swedish top singles chart and has been certified gold.
- In February 2011, Tove Styrke issued the third single, "High and Low", she released an EP featuring six remixes of the track.
- "Call My Name" was released as the fourth single in Sweden (22 August 2011) while the album got reissued. "Call My Name" served as first single release in Europe. It was released on 3 February 2012 in Germany.
- "Bad Time for a Good Time (feat. Gnucci Banana)" was released as digital single on 15 February 2012 in Scandinavia, within the following months it was released internationally.

== Charts ==
=== Weekly charts ===
| Chart (2010–2011) | Peak position |
|---|---|
| Swedish Albums (Sverigetopplistan) | 10 |

=== Year-end charts ===
| Chart (2010) | Position |
|---|---|
| Swedish Albums (Sverigetopplistan) | 86 |
| Chart (2011) | Position |
| Swedish Albums (Sverigetopplistan) | 81 |
