= Oh Mama (Lili & Susie song) =

1987 single by Lili & Sussie

- Artwork for most 7-inch vinyl releases

Single by Lili & Sussie

from the album Dance Romance
- B-side: "If It's Love"
- Released: 1987
- Genre: Pop
- Length: 3:52
- Label: EMI
- Songwriter(s): Tim Norell; Ola Håkansson
- Producer(s): Tim Norell; Ola Håkansson; Anders Hansson

Lili & Sussie singles chronology
"Stay" (1986)	"Oh Mama" (1987)	"Bara du och jag" (1987)

"Oh Mama" is a song by Swedish pop duo Lili & Sussie, released in 1987 as the second single from their second studio album, Dance Romance (1987).

== Track listing and formats ==
- Swedish 7-inch single

A. "Oh Mama" – 3:52
B. "If It's Love" – 5:44

- Swedish 12-inch single

A. "Oh Mama" (Euro-Mix) – 6:26
B1. "Oh Mama" (U.S.-Mix) – 6:47
B2. "If It's Love" – 6:34

== Credits and personnel ==
- Lili Päivärinta – vocals
- Susie Päivärinta – vocals
- Tim Norell – songwriter, producer, arranger, engineering, mixing
- Ola Håkansson – songwriter, producer, arranger, engineering, mixing
- Anders Hansson – producer, arranger, engineering, mixing
- Calle Bengtsson – cover art, photographer
- Jan Rydqvist – cover art, photographer
- Ulla Jormin – cover art designer

Credits and personnel adapted from the Dance Romance album and 7-inch single liner notes.

== Charts ==
Weekly chart performance for "Oh Mama"
Chart (1987–1988)	Peak position
Sweden (Sverigetopplistan)	1

== Certifications and sales ==
Certifications and sales for "Oh Mama"
Region	Certification	Certified units/sales
Sweden (GLF)	Gold	25,000^{^}
^{^} Shipments figures based on certification alone.
