= Howl Howl Gaff Gaff =

- Cover of the original 2003 Scandinavian release

Studio album by Shout Out Louds
- Released: 1 October 2003
- Recorded: Rockfield Studio, Monmouth and Sawmills Studio, Cornwall 2003
- Genres: Indie rock, indie pop
- Length: 40:22 (Scandinavian version); 44:05 (international version)
- Label: Bud Fox
- Producer: Ronald Bood

Shout Out Louds chronology
Howl Howl Gaff Gaff (2003)	Our Ill Wills (2007)

Alternative cover
- Cover of the international release

Singles from Howl Howl Gaff Gaff
- 1. "Shut Your Eyes" Released: 2003; 2. "Please Please Please" Released: 2004; 3. "Oh Sweetheart" Released: 2004; 4. "Very Loud" Released: 2004; 5. "The Comeback" Released: 2005

Howl Howl Gaff Gaff is the debut full length album from Swedish band Shout Out Louds. The original version released in Scandinavian countries on 1 October 2003 contained a slightly different track listing from the international release. Their website advertises the international version as being "A collection of songs from all our Scandinavian releases. Everything from plastic to vinyl."

The international version was released on 24 May 2005 in the United States and Canada. Followed by the releases in Japan on 13 June 2005 and the rest of the world in September 2005.

Professional ratings
Review scores
Source	Rating
AllMusic	4/5 stars
Robert Christgau	(1-star Honorable Mention)
Entertainment Weekly	B+
Pitchfork	(6.9/10)
Rolling Stone	3.5/5 stars

== Track listing ==
=== Scandinavian release (2003) ===
No.	Title	Length
1.	"The Comeback"	2:46
2.	"Very Loud"	4:04
3.	"Shut Your Eyes"	3:09
4.	"Please Please Please"	3:29
5.	"There's Nothing"	3:34
6.	"Sound Is the Word"	4:07
7.	"100°"	3:46
8.	"Wish I Was Dead"	4:36
9.	"End Up Behind"	3:22
10.	"Never Ever"	3:47
11.	"My Friend and the Ink on His Fingers"	3:34

=== International release (2005) ===
No.	Title	Length
1.	"The Comeback"	2:48
2.	"Very Loud"	4:05
3.	"Oh, Sweetheart"	3:20
4.	"A Track and a Train"	4:45
5.	"Go Sadness"	4:04
6.	"Please Please Please"	3:30
7.	"100°"	3:48
8.	"There's Nothing"	3:36
9.	"Hurry Up Let's Go"	2:18
10.	"Shut Your Eyes"	3:11
11.	"Seagull"	8:33

== Singles ==
- "Very Loud" (Vinyl only)
- "Shut Your Eyes"
- "Very Loud" (CD reissue)
- "The Comeback"
- "Please Please Please"

== Release details ==
Country	Date	Label	Format
Scandinavia	1 October 2003	Bud Fox Recordings	CD
United States	May 24, 2005	EMI	CD
Japan	13 June 2005	EMI	CD
United Kingdom	19 September 2005	EMI	CD
