= Our Ill Wills =

Studio album by Shout Out Louds
- Released: 25 April 2007
- Recorded: Late 2006
- Genres: Indie pop, indie rock
- Length: 48:08
- Labels: Bud Fox Recordings, Haldern Pop Recordings, Merge Records, Dew Process
- Producer: Björn Yttling

Shout Out Louds chronology
| Howl Howl Gaff Gaff (2003) | Our Ill Wills (2007) | Work (2010) |

Professional ratings
Aggregate scores
| Source | Rating |
|---|---|
| Metacritic | 72/100 link |
Review scores
| Source | Rating |
| AllMusic | link |
| Blender | link |
| Filter Magazine | 88% 10 September 2007 |
| Pitchfork | 7.4/10 19 September 2007 |
| Rave Magazine | link |
| Rockfeedback | 4/5 stars |
| Slant Magazine | 10 September 2007 |
| Stylus Magazine | C 26 September 2007 |

Our Ill Wills is the second album by Stockholm-based Indie pop/rock band Shout Out Louds. It was released on 25 April 2007 in Sweden and was released by the end of May in several European countries. The United States version was released on 11 September 2007. The first single was "Tonight I Have to Leave It", released on 9 April 2007 in Sweden.

The album was produced by Björn Yttling, singer, bassist and keyboard-player of the Swedish Indie pop band Peter Bjorn and John.

The cover art features the band and album names spelled out in international maritime signal flags.

This album features more vocals from Bebban Stenborg who is usually backing Adam Olenius. She sings the entire of "Blue Headlights".

== Track listing ==
| No. | Title | Length |
|---|---|---|
| 1. | "Tonight I Have to Leave It" | 3:33 |
| 2. | "Parents Living Room" | 3:51 |
| 3. | "You Are Dreaming" | 3:29 |
| 4. | "Suit Yourself" | 2:57 |
| 5. | "Blue Headlights" | 4:07 |
| 6. | "Impossible" | 6:48 |
| 7. | "Normandie" | 3:22 |
| 8. | "South America" | 5:01 |
| 9. | "Ill Wills" | 1:49 |
| 10. | "Time Left for Love" | 3:15 |
| 11. | "Meat Is Murder" | 2:14 |
| 12. | "Hard Rain" | 7:26 |

Bonus Tracks
| No. | Title | Length |
|---|---|---|
| 13. | "Bicycle" (On the vinyl LP version as the 13th track) | 2:25 |
| 14. | "Don't Get Yourself Involved" (On the Swedish limited digipack edition and Australian edition between "Meat Is Murder" and "Hard Rain".) | 4:11 |

== Singles ==
- "Tonight I Have to Leave It", released April 9, 2007
- "Impossible", released April 8, 2008
