= Bara du och jag =

1987 song by Lili & Susie

Single by Lili & Susie

from the album Dance Romance
- B-side: "Du har min kärlek"
- Released: 1987
- Genre: Pop; disco
- Length: 4:12
- Label: EMI
- Songwriter(s): Ola Håkansson; Tim Norell
- Producer(s): Trigonometri

Lili & Susie singles chronology
"Oh Mama" (1987)	"Bara du och jag" (1987)	"Enkel resa" (1988)

"Bara du och jag" ("Only you and I") is a song by Swedish pop duo Lili & Susie from their second studio album Dance Romance (1987). The pop and disco song was written by Ola Håkansson and Tim Norell, and produced by Trigonometri. It peaked at number 18 on the Swedish singles chart.

== Reception ==
Ronny Larsson of QX ranked the duo's singles in 2020, placing "Bara du och jag" at number five.

== Track listing and formats ==
- Scandinavian 7-inch single

A. "Bara du och jag" – 4:12
B. "Du har min kärlek" – 3:56

== Credits and personnel ==
Credits are adapted from the "Bara du och jag" single.

- Ola Håkansson – songwriting
- Tim Norell – songwriting
- Trigonometri – production, arranging, recording

== Charts ==
Weekly chart performance for "Bara du och jag"
Chart (1988)	Peak position
Sweden (Sverigetopplistan)	18

== Tove Styrke version ==
"Bara du och jag"

Single by Tove Styrke

from the EP Så mycket bättre 2020 – Tolkningarna
- Released: 30 November 2020
- Length: 3:05
- Label: Milkshake; Sony Music
- Songwriter(s): Ola Håkansson; Tim Norell
- Producer(s): Victor Thell

Tove Styrke singles chronology
"Love Me Back" (2019)	"Bara du och jag" (2020)	"Mood Swings" (2021)

In 2020, Swedish singer Tove Styrke recorded a cover of "Bara du och jag" for the TV4 music reality television series Så mycket bättre. Styrke's version was produced by Victor Thell. It was released as a single on 30 November 2020 through Milkshake and Sony Music. The song peaked at number 30 on the Swedish singles chart and was certified gold by the Swedish Recording Industry Association (GLF). "Bara du och jag" is included on Styrke's second extended play (EP) Så mycket bättre 2020 – Tolkningarna (2020) which includes her three covers from Så mycket bättre.

=== Charts ===
Chart performance for "Bara du och jag"
Chart (2021)	Peak position
Sweden (Sverigetopplistan)	30

=== Certifications ===
Certifications for "Bara du och jag"
Region	Certification	Certified units/sales
Sweden (GLF)	Gold	4,000,000^{†}
^{†} Streaming-only figures based on certification alone.

=== Release history ===
Release dates and formats for "Bara du och jag"
Country	Date	Format	Label	Ref.
Various	30 November 2020	Digital download; streaming	Milkshake; Sony Music	
Sweden	1 December 2020	Radio airplay	Milkshake; Sony Music	
