= Stefan Thor =

Swedish professor of developmental biology

Stefan Thor (born 1964) is a Swedish professor of developmental biology at The University of Queensland.

Stefan Thor was born in Uppsala, Sweden. He obtained a bachelor's degree in 1988 and a doctorate degree in molecular biology in 1994 at Umeå University, Sweden. Between 1994 and 1999 he was a visiting research fellow at Salk Institute, La Jolla, United States, followed by five years as assistant professor and head of a research group at the Department of Neurobiology at Harvard Medical School, Boston. In 2004 he was appointed professor of biology at Linköping University, focusing on evolutionary biology and molecular genetics. In 2018, Dr Thor transferred to Australia, and took up position as Professor of Developmental Biology at The University of Queensland, in Brisbane.

Thor's research team investigates the formation of the nervous system during embryonic development, i.e. its early development from a fertilized egg cell. Using the fruit fly Drosophila, the mouse and human stem cells as model systems, Thor's research could be significant in the future in the fight against human neurological diseases.

Thor was the 2008 recipient of the prestigious Swedish award, the Göran Gustafsson Prize in molecular biology, and the annual Eric K Fernström Prize, which heralds young, and successful researchers at six Swedish medical faculties.
