= Call My Name (Tove Styrke song) =

Single by Tove Styrke

from the album Tove Styrke
- Released: 19 August 2011
- Recorded: 2011
- Genre: Pop
- Length: 3:43
- Label: Sony Music Entertainment
- Songwriters: Peter Ågren, Tove Styrke, Janne Kask
- Producers: Peter Ågren, Janne Kask

Tove Styrke singles chronology
"High and Low" (2011)	"Call My Name" (2011)	"Bad Time for a Good Time" (2012)

"Call My Name" is a single by Swedish singer, songwriter, pianist, and model Tove Styrke, released from her debut studio album. The single was released on 19 August 2011 on digital download. The song peaked at number 28 on the Swedish Singles Chart.

== Music video ==
A music video to accompany the release of "Mojvideo" 011, at a total length of three minutes and fifty-one seconds.

== Track listings ==
Digital download

1. "Call My Name" - 3:43
2. "High and Low" (Taped Remix) - 6:08
3. "High and Low" (Taped Radio Edit) - 3:35

Remix EP (Germany)

1. "Call My Name" - 3:43
2. "Call My Name" (Dimitri Vangelis & Wyman Remix Radio Edit) - 4:00
3. "Call My Name" (Cashmere Cat Remix) - 6:28
4. "Call My Name" (Instrumental) - 3:42
5. "Call My Name" (Video)

== Chart performance ==
Chart performance for "Call My Name"
Chart (2011–12)	Peak position
Belgium (Ultratip Bubbling Under Flanders)	56
Germany (GfK)	48
Sweden (Sverigetopplistan)	28
Switzerland Airplay (Swiss Hitparade)	31

== Release history ==
Release dates and formats for "Call My Name"
Country	Date	Format	Label	Ref.
Sweden	19 August 2011	Digital download; streaming	Sony Music	
Sweden	2 November 2011	Radio airplay	Sony Music	
Germany	24 February 2012	CD single	Sony Music	
