= Hardcore (song) =

2022 single by Tove Styrke

Single by Tove Styrke

from the album Hard
- Released: 11 March 2022
- Length: 2:52
- Label: Sony Music
- Songwriters: Tove Styrke; Elvira Anderfjärd; Jakob Jerlström
- Producer: Elvira

Tove Styrke singles chronology
"Show Me Love" (2022)	"Hardcore" (2022)	"YouYouYou" (2022)

"Hardcore" is a song by Swedish singer Tove Styrke from her fourth studio album, Hard (2022). It was released as a single on 11 March 2022 through Sony Music. The song was written by Styrke, Elvira Anderfjärd, and Jakob Jerlström, with production by Anderfjärd.

== Background and composition ==
"Hardcore" was written by Tove Styrke, Elvira Anderfjärd, and Jakob Jerlström for Styrke's fourth studio album, Hard (2022). Anderfjärd produced the song and played all the instruments. Regarding the song, Styrke said, "'Hardcore' is definitely one of my favorite tracks on the album. It's about wanting someone hardcore. I took the term from gaming; if you die you die but it's all in. I also wanted to make the track sound drunk, like when you're lost in a person. That's why we made the tempo-shifts before each chorus. The production is so good on this one, it blows my mind." The track includes "scream-sing" vocals, which stem from Styrke "saying 'fuck it'" and wanting to take risks. In an interview for Rolling Stone, she stated, "The lyrics don't even make sense sometimes, but it suits the song because it's meant to feel like you're drunk. I needed to just like let it all out." "Hardcore" was released on 11 March 2022 through Sony Music.

== Credits and personnel ==
Credits are adapted from Tidal.

- Tove Styrke – vocals, songwriting
- Elvira Anderfjärd – production, songwriting, background vocals, bass, drums, keyboards, strings
- Jakob Jerlström – songwriting
- Michael Ilbert – mixing
- Randy Merrill – mastering

== Charts ==
Chart performance for "Hardcore"
Chart (2022)	Peak position
Sweden Heatseeker (Sverigetopplistan)	8

== Release history ==
Release dates and formats for "Hardcore"
Country	Date	Format(s)	Label	Ref.
Various	11 March 2022	Digital download; streaming	Sony Music	
Sweden	16 March 2022	Radio airplay	Sony Music	
