= Kiddo (album) =

Studio album by Tove Styrke
- Released: 8 June 2015
- Recorded: 2014–2015
- Genre: Electropop
- Length: 42:59
- Label: RCA
- Producer: Carl Ask; Jan Kask; Johan T Karlsson; Hallberg; Christian Walz

Tove Styrke chronology
Borderline (2014)	Kiddo (2015)	Sway (2018)

Singles from Kiddo
- 1. "Even If I'm Loud It Doesn't Mean I'm Talking to You" Released: 22 May 2014; 2. "Borderline" Released: 9 October 2014; 3. "Ego" Released: 23 January 2015; 4. "Number One" Released: 13 May 2015

Kiddo is the second studio album by Swedish electropop singer Tove Styrke. It was released on 8 June 2015 by Sony Music. The album includes all five original songs from the EP Borderline.

== Background ==
The title Kiddo is a direct reference to Beatrix Kiddo from the Kill Bill films. According to Styrke: "I like her character a lot — she's empowering and cool. Kill Bill was an influence from some of the songs [on the album], and especially in the beginning of the creative process of this album. I also have a love-hate relationship with the word "kiddo," it's something that people say in a demeaning manner. I felt if I took that word and used it almost as a superhero name, then I would take the power away from them and use it as a strength. That's the interesting part about language, you can use it to tell your own story. I like doing that when I write".

== Reception ==
Professional ratings
Review scores
Source	Rating
The Line of Best Fit	7.5/10
Spin	8/10
Time	(positive)

Spin rated Kiddo with 8 from 10 and named it "Album of the Week". Time reviewed the album favourably and called it "a Feminist Pop Triumph".

=== Accolades ===
Publication	Country	Accolade	Year	Rank
Spin	United States	25 Best Pop Albums of the Year	2015	9

== Track listing ==
Standard edition
No.	Title	Writer(s)	Producer(s)	Length
1.	"Ain't Got No..."	Tove Styrke; Jan Kask	Carl Ask; Johan T Karlsson^{[a]}	3:52
2.	"Snaren"	Styrke; Linnea Henriksson; Hallberg	Karlsson	3:01
3.	"Ego"	Styrke; Arnthor Birgisson; Amie Miriello; Sarah De Bono	Karlsson	3:48
4.	"Samurai Boy"	Styrke; Kask	Karlsson	3:27
5.	"Borderline"	Styrke; Kask	Karlsson	3:23
6.	"Who's Got News"	Styrke; Henriksson	Karlsson^{[a]}	3:35
7.	"Number One"	Styrke; Kask	Ask	3:23
8.	"Even If I'm Loud It Doesn't Mean I'm Talking to You"	Styrke	Ask; Karlsson^{[a]}	3:04
9.	"Burn"	Styrke	Christian Walz	3:40
10.	"Decay"	Styrke; Kask	Karlsson	4:05
11.	"Walking a Line"	Styrke; Kask	Karlsson	3:50
12.	"Brag"	Styrke	Walz	3:51
Total length:				43:00

Spotify bonus track
No.	Title	Writer(s)	Producer(s)	Length
13.	"Working Song"	Styrke	Kask	3:22
Total length:				46:21

Notes

- ^{^a} signifies a co-producer

== Personnel ==
Credits adapted from the CD liner notes of Kiddo.

- Tove Styrke – vocals
- Johan T Karlsson – production (tracks 2–4, 10, 11); co-production (tracks 1, 6, 8)
- Tom Coyne – mastering
- Petter Eriksson – A&R
- Slobodan Zivic – art direction
- Carl Ask – production (tracks 1, 7–8)
- Björn Hallberg – production (track 6)
- Christian Walz – production (tracks 9, 12)
- Hedvig Jenning – photography

== Charts ==
Chart performance for Kiddo
Chart (2015)	Peak position
Swedish Albums (Sverigetopplistan)	14
