= White Light Moment =

2010 single by Tove Styrke

Single by Tove Styrke

from the album Tove Styrke
- Released: 26 October 2010
- Length: 3:42
- Label: Sony Music
- Songwriter(s): Tove Styrke; Jan Kask; Peter Ågren
- Producer(s): Jan Kask; Peter Ågren

Tove Styrke singles chronology
"Million Pieces" (2010)	"White Light Moment" (2010)	"High and Low" (2011)

"White Light Moment" is a song by Swedish singer Tove Styrke from her debut studio album, Tove Styrke (2010). Sony Music released it as the album's second single on 26 October 2010. Styrke wrote the song with its producers, Jan Kask and Peter Ågren. "White Light Moment" received general praise from music critics. The song attained commercial success in Sweden, where it peaked at number five on the Sverigetopplistan chart, becoming Styrke's best-performing single on the chart. It was certified gold by the Swedish Recording Industry Association (GLF) in 2010. "White Light Moment" was nominated for Song of the Year at the 2012 Grammis Awards.

== Background ==
Tove Styrke wrote "White Light Moment" with Jan Kask and Peter Ågren. In an interview for Västerbottens-Kuriren, she explained that the song is about longing for "grandiose moments" in life. The song was produced by Kask and Ågren, while Anders Hvenare handled mixing. "White Light Moment" was serviced to radio stations in Sweden on 25 October 2010, followed by a digital release the following day, through Sony Music. It served as the second single from her debut studio album Tove Styrke (2010).

Styrke re-recorded the song for a limited-run 7-inch single in 2015. The re-worked version, titled "WLM", was produced by Johan Eckeborn. The single was released for Record Store Day on 18 April 2015 and included a remix of her 2015 song "Ego" on its B-side.

== Reception ==
"White Light Moment" was met with positive reviews in the Swedish press. Carin Jönsson of TT News Agency described the song as Kelly Clarkson-esque, "but better". Mattias Dahlström of Dagens Nyheter named it the best track on Tove Styrke, and both Västerbottens-Kuriren's Simon Österhof and Metro's Anneli Sandberg considered it one of the highlights of the album. Peter Carlsson, writing for Örnsköldsviks Allehanda, regarded it a hit single. Karin Fredriksson of Helsingborgs Dagblad described it as a "glossy and nice Pet Shop Boys disco" song. The song earned Styrke her first Grammis nomination in the category for Song of the Year.

"White Light Moment" debuted at number 21 on the Sverigetopplistan singles chart on 19 November 2010. The following week, it attained its peak position at number five, becoming Styrke's best-performing single on the chart. The song remained on the chart for 21 weeks. It was certified gold by the Swedish Recording Industry Association (GLF), indicating sales of 20,000 units. As measured by STIM, the song was the fifth-most-played song on Swedish radio stations during the second half of 2010 and the first half of 2011.

== Track listing ==
- Digital single
1. "White Light Moment" – 3:42
- 7-inch
1. "WLM" – 3:42
2. "Ego" (Bearson remix) – 3:59

== Credits and personnel ==
Credits are adapted from the Tove Styrke liner notes.

- Tove Styrke – songwriting
- Jan Kask – songwriting, production
- Peter Ågren – songwriting, production
- Anders Hvenare – mixing
- Christoffer Stannow – mastering

== Charts ==
=== Weekly charts ===
Weekly chart performance for "White Light Moment"
Chart (2010)	Peak position
Sweden (Sverigetopplistan)	5

=== Year-end charts ===
Yearly chart performance for "White Light Moment"
Chart (2010)	Position
Sweden (Sverigetopplistan)	47
Chart (2011)	Position
Sweden (Sverigetopplistan)	88

== Certifications ==
Region	Certification	Certified units/sales
Sweden (GLF)	Gold	20,000^{‡}
^{‡} Sales+streaming figures based on certification alone.

== Release history ==
Release dates and formats for "White Light Moment"
Country	Date	Format(s)	Version	Label	Ref.
Sweden	25 October 2010	Radio	Original version	Sony Music	
Sweden	26 October 2010	Digital download	Original version	Sony Music	
Various	18 April 2015	7-inch	"WLM"	RCA	
