= Hard (Tove Styrke album) =

Studio album by Tove Styrke
- Released: 3 June 2022
- Length: 30:47
- Label: Sony Music

Tove Styrke chronology
Sway (2018)	Hard (2022)

Singles from Hard
- 1. "Start Walking" Released: 22 October 2021; 2. "Show Me Love" Released: 21 January 2022; 3. "Hardcore" Released: 11 March 2022; 4. "YouYouYou" Released: 6 May 2022; 5. "Another Broken Heart" Released: 9 September 2022

Hard (stylised in all caps) is the fourth studio album by Swedish singer Tove Styrke. It was released on 3 June 2022 by Sony Music.

== Release and promotion ==
"Start Walking" was released as the album's lead single on 22 October 2021. The second single "Show Me Love" followed on 21 January 2022. "Hardcore" was released as the third single on 11 March 2022, and "YouYouYou" was released as the fourth single on 6 May 2022.

Hard was released on 3 June 2022. Originally released with nine tracks, the album's track listing was updated twice: "Cool Me Down" was added on 10 June 2022 and "Another Broken Heart" on 2 September 2022. The latter was sent to radio on 9 September 2022.

== Reception ==
Hard received generally positive reviews by music critics. Stephen Daw of Billboard regarded the album "stunning", writing that Styrke "exudes confidence and pure pop bliss". Dave Russell of The Line of Best Fit praised Styrke's vocal performance throughout the record. He wrote, "Hard isn't perfect – and maybe that's part of the point – but Styrke doesn't lose sight of her sense of fun."

== Track listing ==
Hard track listing
No.	Title	Writer(s)	Producer(s)	Length
1.	"YouYouYou"	Tove Styrke; Lilian Caputo; Jason OK; Garret Borns; Ethan Schneiderman; Ally Ahern	Schneiderman; Jason OK; Randy Merrill	3:03
2.	"Cool Me Down"	Styrke; Jenna Andrews; Oscar Scheller	Scheller; Svidden; Oliver Ländin	2:38
3.	"Another Broken Heart"	Styrke; Emelie Walcott; Jason Gill; Oskar Widen; Wilhelm Börjesson	Gill; Widen	2:47
4.	"Lies"	Styrke; Elof Loelv	Loelv	2:24
5.	"Free"	Styrke; Sophie Somajo; Rasmus Cantoreggi; Loelv	Gustav Nyström; Cantoreggi	2:42
6.	"24H"	Styrke; Nyström; Somajo; Jakob Jerlström	Nyström	2:57
7.	"Hardcore"	Styrke; Elvira Anderfjärd; Jerlström	Elvira	2:52
8.	"Start Walking"	Styrke; Pablo Bowman; Peter Rycroft; Caroline Ailin; Sly	Lostboy	3:14
9.	"Millennial Blues"	Styrke; Scheller	Scheller	2:24
10.	"Show Me Love"	Styrke; Somajo; Loelv	Loelv	2:33
11.	"Bruises"	Styrke; Brian Burton; David Morris; Loelv; James Mercer; John Challenger	Loelv	3:07
Total length:				30:47

Notes

- "Cool Me Down" was added to the track listing on 10 June 2022.
- "Another Broken Heart" was added to the track listing on 2 September 2022.

== Charts ==
Chart performance for Hard
Chart (2022)	Peak position
Swedish Albums (Sverigetopplistan)	58
