= Ted Malmros =

Swedish musician

Ted Malmros is a Swedish music video director and musician. He is the bassist for Swedish indie pop group Shout Out Louds, and also contributes backing vocals and percussion. Malmros, along with his brother Tom Malmros, has directed all of Shout Out Louds' music videos to date, and has also directed videos for fellow Swedish artists, including Dag för Dag and Lykke Li. He is best known for his video for Peter Bjorn and John's "Young Folks", for which he won a Grammis.
