= Mood Swings (Tove Styrke song) =

Single by Tove Styrke
- Released: 18 June 2021
- Genre: Pop
- Length: 2:15
- Label: Sony Music
- Songwriters: Tove Styrke; Christoph Andersson; Jenna Andrews; Noah Conrad; Rollo; Sorana Pacurar
- Producers: Andersson; Conrad

Tove Styrke singles chronology
"Bara du och jag" (2020)	"Mood Swings" (2021)	"All Things $ Can Do" (2021)

"Mood Swings" is a song by Swedish singer Tove Styrke. It was released as a single on 18 June 2021 through Sony Music.

== Background ==
"Mood Swings" was written by Tove Styrke, Christoph Andersson, Jenna Andrews, Noah Conrad, Rollo, and Sorana Pacurar. While working on new a new project, Styrke was sent a demo of the song and she instantly liked it. In an interview for The Line of Best Fit, she explained, "I loved the vibe and could totally envision exactly what it was going to be when it's finished." She then rewrote parts of the song, stating that she "chopped some stuff off and reproduced it and everything". "Mood Swings" was produced by Andersson and Conrad. In an interview for Wonderland, Styrke described the song as a "product of COVID" as it was made during several Zoom sessions. She said, "It's a Zoom song and that was really the song that made it clear to me what it was that I wanted to do this time around." "Mood Swings" was released as a single on 18 June 2021 through Sony Music.

== Composition and lyrics ==
"Mood Swings" is a pop song. Regarding the meaning of the song, Styrke elaborated, "It's paying tribute to my best and worst sides. I really hate myself sometimes. But I'm trying really hard not to. These past three years I've been through depression, fell hard in love, survived a Swedish music reality TV-show, I got a car, I got stuck with millennial blues, I feel like an adult sometimes, I feel like I did as a child. I feel kinda [sic] free."

== Reception ==
Writing for Paper, Shaad D'Souza wrote positively of the single, "Tove has returned with this delightful, frothy, chaotic girl anthem. Her absence was worth the wait." "Mood Swings" debuted and peaked at number 62 on the Sverigetopplistan singles chart on 25 June 2021.

== Music video ==
Gustav Stegfors directed the accompanying music video for "Mood Swings".

== Charts ==
Chart performance for "Mood Swings"
Chart (2021)	Peak position
Sweden (Sverigetopplistan)	62
