= Show Me Love (Tove Styrke song) =

Single by Tove Styrke

from the album Hard
- Released: 21 January 2022
- Genre: Pop; alternative pop; soft rock
- Length: 2:33
- Label: Sony Music
- Songwriters: Tove Styrke; Sophia Somajo; Elof Loelv
- Producer: Loelv

Tove Styrke singles chronology
"Start Walking" (2021)	"Show Me Love" (2022)	"Hardcore" (2022)

"Show Me Love" is a song by Swedish singer Tove Styrke. It was released as a single on 21 January 2022 through Sony Music as the second single from her fourth studio album, Hard (2022).

== Background ==
"Show Me Love" was written by Tove Styrke, Sophia Somajo, and Elof Loelv. The song was released as a single on 21 January 2022 through Sony Music.

== Music video ==
Oskar Gullstrand and Tove Berglund directed the accompanying music video for "Show Me Love".

== Charts ==
Chart performance for "Show Me Love"
Chart (2022)	Peak position
Sweden (Sverigetopplistan)	93
