= Start Walking =

Single by Tove Styrke

from the album Hard
- Released: 22 October 2021
- Genre: Synth-pop
- Length: 3:14
- Label: Sony Music
- Songwriters: Tove Styrke; Pablo Bowman; Peter Rycroft; Caroline Ailin; Sly
- Producer: Lostboy

Tove Styrke singles chronology
"All Things $ Can Do" (2021)	"Start Walking" (2021)	"Show Me Love" (2022)

"Start Walking" is a song by Swedish singer Tove Styrke. It was released on 22 October 2021 through Sony Music as the lead single from her fourth studio album, Hard (2022).

== Background ==
"Start Walking" was written by Tove Styrke, Pablo Bowman, Peter Rycroft, Caroline Ailin, and Sly. Styrke previously collaborated with Ailin on her third studio album Sway (2018). "Start Walking" was produced by Lostboy. The song was released as a single on 22 October 2021 through Sony Music.

== Composition and lyrics ==
"Start Walking" is a pop song. Styrke described the song as a "disco banger". Regarding its lyrics, she deemed it an "upbeat song with sad lyrics". She said, "It's about a person who knows a relationship is over, and how it sucks to actually be the one to leave but you know there is no other way."

== Reception ==
"Start Walking" debuted and peaked at number 79 on the Sverigetopplistan singles chart on 29 October 2021.

== Music video ==
Oskar Gullstrand directed the accompanying music video for "Start Walking".

== Track listing ==
- Digital download
1. "Start Walking" – 3:14
- Digital download
1. "Start Walking (acoustic version) – 3:24

== Credits and personnel ==
Credits are adapted from Tidal.

- Tove Styrke – songwriting
- Pablo Bowman – songwriting
- Peter Rycroft – songwriting
- Caroline Ailin – songwriting
- Sly – songwriting
- Lostboy – production, keyboards, programming
- Henrik Edenhed – mixing

== Charts ==
Chart performance for "Start Walking"
Chart (2021)	Peak position
Sweden (Sverigetopplistan)	79
