= Tove Styrke =

Swedish singer and songwriter (born 1992)

- Styrke in 2022

Background information
- Born: Tove Anna Linnéa Östman Styrke; 19 November 1992 (age 33); Umeå, Sweden
- Genres: Pop; electropop
- Occupation: Singer-songwriter
- Instruments: Vocals; piano; guitar
- Works: Discography
- Years active: 2009–present
- Labels: Columbia; Milkshake; Sony; RCA
- Website: tovestyrkemusic.com

Tove Anna Linnéa Östman Styrke (Swedish pronunciation: [ˈtǔːvɛ ˈstʏ̂rːkɛ]; born 19 November 1992) is a Swedish singer and songwriter. She gained popularity as a contestant on Swedish Idol 2009, finishing in third place. After the show, she started a solo career in electropop. She signed with RCA Records to release her self-titled debut album (2010), which led New York Post to included Styrke in its "10 Artists to Know in 2011" list. Her second album, Kiddo (2015), peaked at number 14 on the Sverigetopplistan chart, and her third album, Sway (2018), peaked at number 11. Her 2017 single, "Say My Name," was included in Rolling Stone's 100 best songs of the decade.

== Biography ==
Styrke was born in Umeå, Sweden. She has two sisters, one younger and one older. Her father, musician Anders Östman, scored a number one hit on the Swedish radio chart, Svensktoppen, in 1975 with the song "Vindens melodi" performed by his dansband Max Fenders. Her mother was a ballet instructor and Styrke took classes from her at an early age.

== Music career ==
=== Tove Styrke and "Call My Name" (2009–2011) ===
After competing on Swedish Idol 2009 and finishing in third place, Styrke was signed by Sony Music label in December 2009. In June 2010, she released her first single, "Million Pieces", which was co-written by Adam Olenius from Shout Out Louds and Lykke Li.

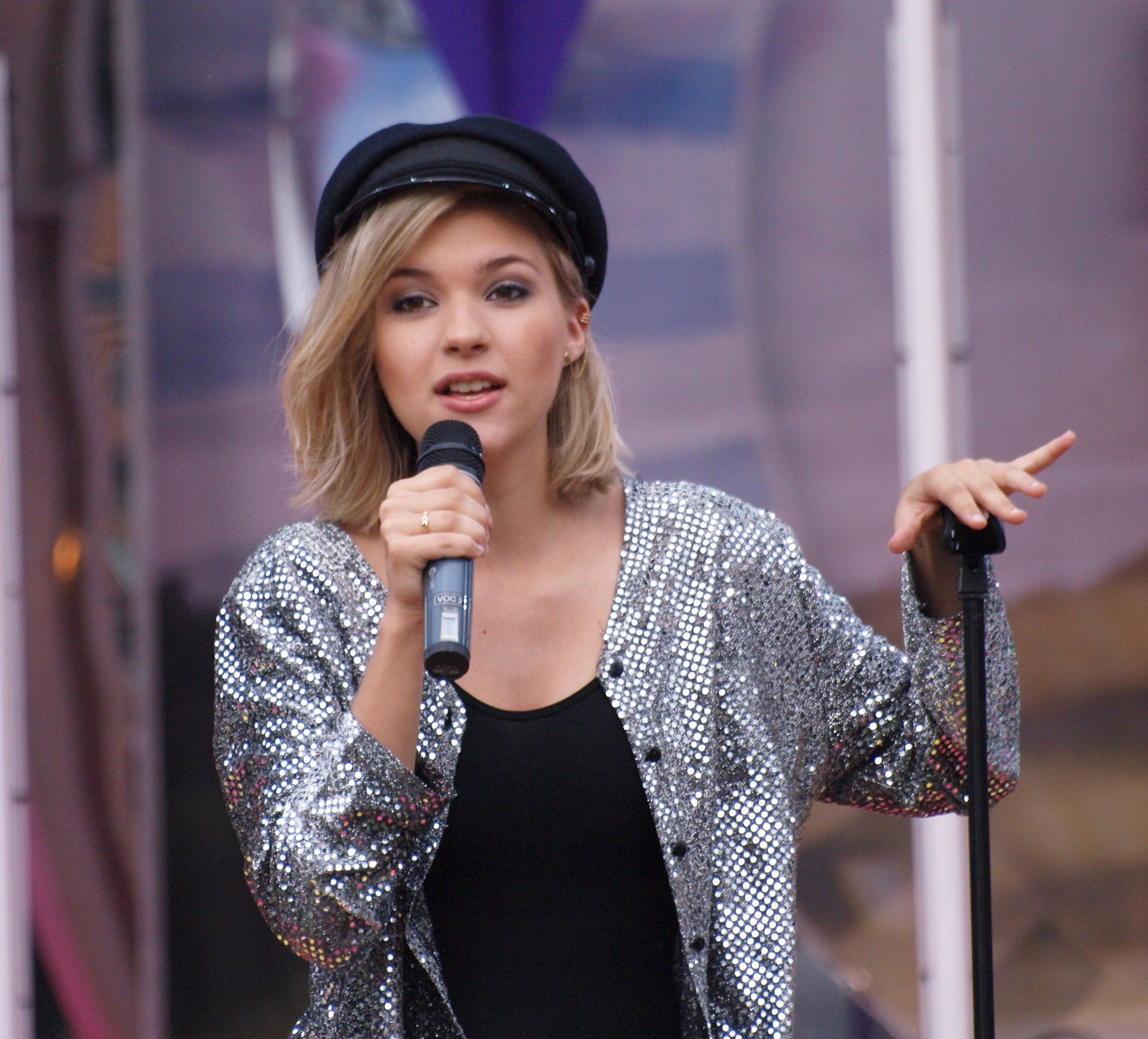
Styrke in 2010

On 12 November 2010, she released her debut album, Tove Styrke. The album was produced by Patrik Berger, Lotus & 2manyfreckles, Peter Ågren, Janne Kask and Paw. It peaked at number 10 on the Swedish single chart, spending 35 weeks on the top album charts in Sweden. It was first certified gold, then later received platinum certification in Sweden. The majority of the album was co-written by Styrke. The album was later re-released in March 2012 in Germany with two new songs: "Call My Name" and "Sticks and Stones". Her second single, "White Light Moment", charted at number five on the Swedish top singles chart and received gold certification. It eventually peaked at number two. "White Light Moment" was later nominated for "Best Song of the Year" at Grammisgalan 2012, the Swedish equivalent of the Grammy Awards.

In January 2011, Styrke won the "Best Newcomer" award at P3 Guld. At ceremony, she performed a remixed version of "Million Pieces" by Swedish record producer Familjen. In February 2011, Styrke issued her first EP, High and Low, featuring six remixes of the title track. In April 2011, Styrke was featured in an IKEA commercial, where she performed the Swedish lullaby "Byssan Lull".

On 19 August 2011, the promotional single "Call My Name" was released on digital download. The song peaked at number six on the Swedish Singles Chart. "Call My Name" was later nominated for "Best Song of the Year" at P3 Guld. That same month, Stryke joined other Swedish artists, collectively called Kedjan, to release a charity single called "Ringar på vattnet" ("Ripple Effect" in English), benefiting Radiohjälpen's charity efforts fighting famine in the Horn of Africa. In September 2011, the Swedish band Caotico collaborated with Styrke on their single released "Brains Out". She also appeared in the music video for the single.

=== Borderline (2013–2014) ===
In 2013, Styrke signed a contract with Sony Music UK. On 22 May 2014 she released her comeback single, "Even If I'm Loud Doesn't Mean I'm Talking To You", on iTunes in Sweden. On 9 October 2014, her next single "Borderline", the first from her upcoming EP of the same title, was released on iTunes. A remixed version of "Borderline" was previously released for the Swedish compilation album, F! on 22 April 2014 on iTunes in Sweden and for online streaming on Spotify. The music video for "Borderline" was filmed in Pyramiden in September 2014 and premiered exclusively on website, "Fader", on 15 October 2014.

Styrke performed songs from the EP and new material at two debut UK shows in London on 5 and 6 November. The song "Brag" premiered exclusively for Nylon on 20 November 2014. The Borderline EP was released for digital download on 23 November 2014. On 17 November 2014, RCA Records announced that Styrke had signed with the label. The label confirmed Styrke's plans to release her first US album via RCA and Sony Sweden in the spring of 2015.

=== Kiddo, Sway, and Hard (2015–present) ===
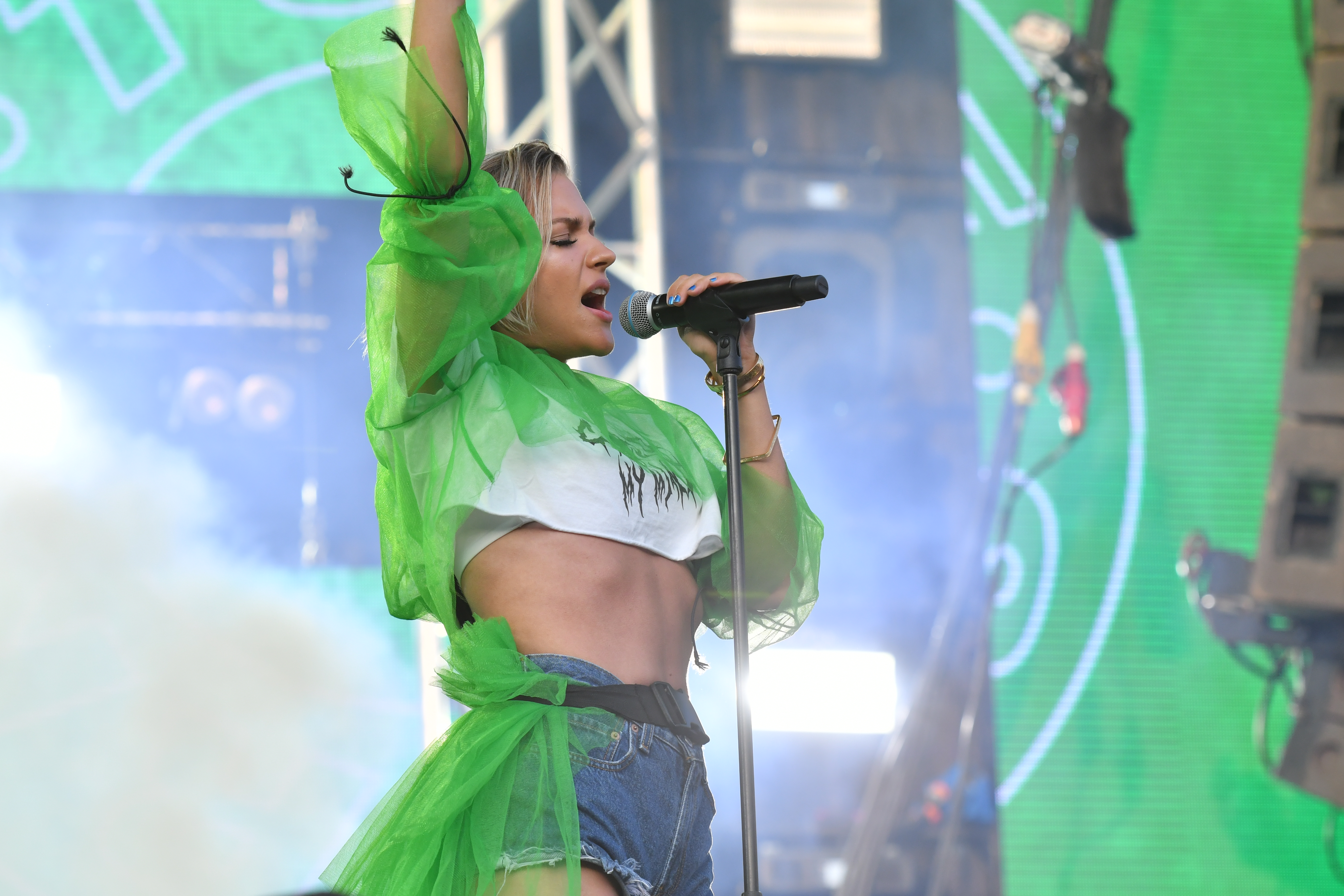
Tove Styrke at Malmöfestivalen 2018.

On 23 January 2015, Styrke premiered the single "Ego" from her second album, Kiddo. The single was available for streaming via her official SoundCloud account and later was released that same day on iTunes. The music video for "Ego" was filmed in Tokyo and premiered on Styrke's Vevo channel on 2 February 2015.

Kiddo was released in digital, vinyl, and physical formats on 8 June 2015. The next single "Number One" was released for streaming on Spotify and digital download for iTunes on 13 May 2015 and was featured on the CW's Riverdale. To promote the album, Styrke attended the annual SXSW festival in March 2015; she later embarked on a small tour of the US in May 2015.

Four days prior to its release, Kiddo exclusively streamed in its entirety for Spotify listeners in Sweden on 5 June 2015.

On 23 July 2015, Stryke released a cover version of "...Baby One More Time" by Britney Spears as a single along its music video.

On 28 April 2017, Styrke released "Say My Name", which would serve as the first single from her third album, Sway. "Mistakes" followed as the second single on 15 September, with "Liability (Demo)" being released as a promotional track on 15 December. "Changed My Mind" was released as the third single alongside the album announcement on 2 February 2018. Before the album's release, the single "On the Low" came out. Sway was released on 4 May 2018 through Sony Music. It was re-released digitally, including the single "Vibe", unveiled on 19 October 2018 ahead of a tour through United Kingdom.

Through 2018 and 2020 she released several collaborations, including a feature on Alma's mixtape Heavy Rules called "Good Vibes", "Last Goodbye" by Clean Bandit also featuring Stefflon Don from their album What Is Love?, "Stuck" with Lost Kings, "Been There, Done That" with NOTD and "Love Me Back" with Ritual. She also participated in the eleventh series of the Swedish reality television show Så mycket bättre.

On 19 June 2021 she released the single "Mood Swings".

Styrke's fourth album with the singles "Start Walking", "Hardcore", "Show Me Love", "YouYouYou", called Hard was released on 3 June 2022. On 23 September 2022 Styrke started her own headlining tour Hard Tour in support of her fourth album.

In April 2026, Stryke announced that she was forming a progressive rock band with Sanna Sikborn Erixon, with whom Stryke is in a relationship.

== Influences ==
According to AllMusic, Styrke combines "the bubbling electronica of Robyn with the hipster synth pop of Annie and the hook-laden Euro-disco of September". The German Kulturspiegel, a monthly extra to Der Spiegel, called Styrke's music "nonchalant, catchy boom-pop" and compared it to Robyn and Lykke Li.

== Personal life ==
Tove Styrke has been in a relationship with fellow musician Sanna Sikborn Erixon since at least January 2020. In an Instagram story on 1 June 2022, Styrke identified as pansexual.

== Awards and nominations ==
=== Sweden GAFFA Awards ===
Delivered since 2010, the GAFFA Awards (Swedish: GAFFA Priset) are a Swedish award that rewards popular music awarded by the magazine of the same name.

Year	Nominee / work	Award	Result	Ref.
2015	Kiddo	Best Pop	Won	

== Discography ==
- Tove Styrke (2010)
- Kiddo (2015)
- Sway (2018)
- Hard (2022)
- I Thought This Story Wasn't About Me (2026)

== Tours ==
Headlining tours

- Sweden tour (2011)
- North America tour (2015)
- Sway Tour (2018)
- Hard Tour (2022–2023)

Supporting tours

- The Ark – Scandinavia tour (2011)
- Years & Years – Communion Tour (2015)
- Bleachers – Gone Now Era Tour (2017)
- Lorde – Melodrama World Tour (2018)
- Katy Perry – Witness: The Tour (2018)
- Marina – Ancient Dreams in a Modern Land Tour (2022)
