= Bjärnum =

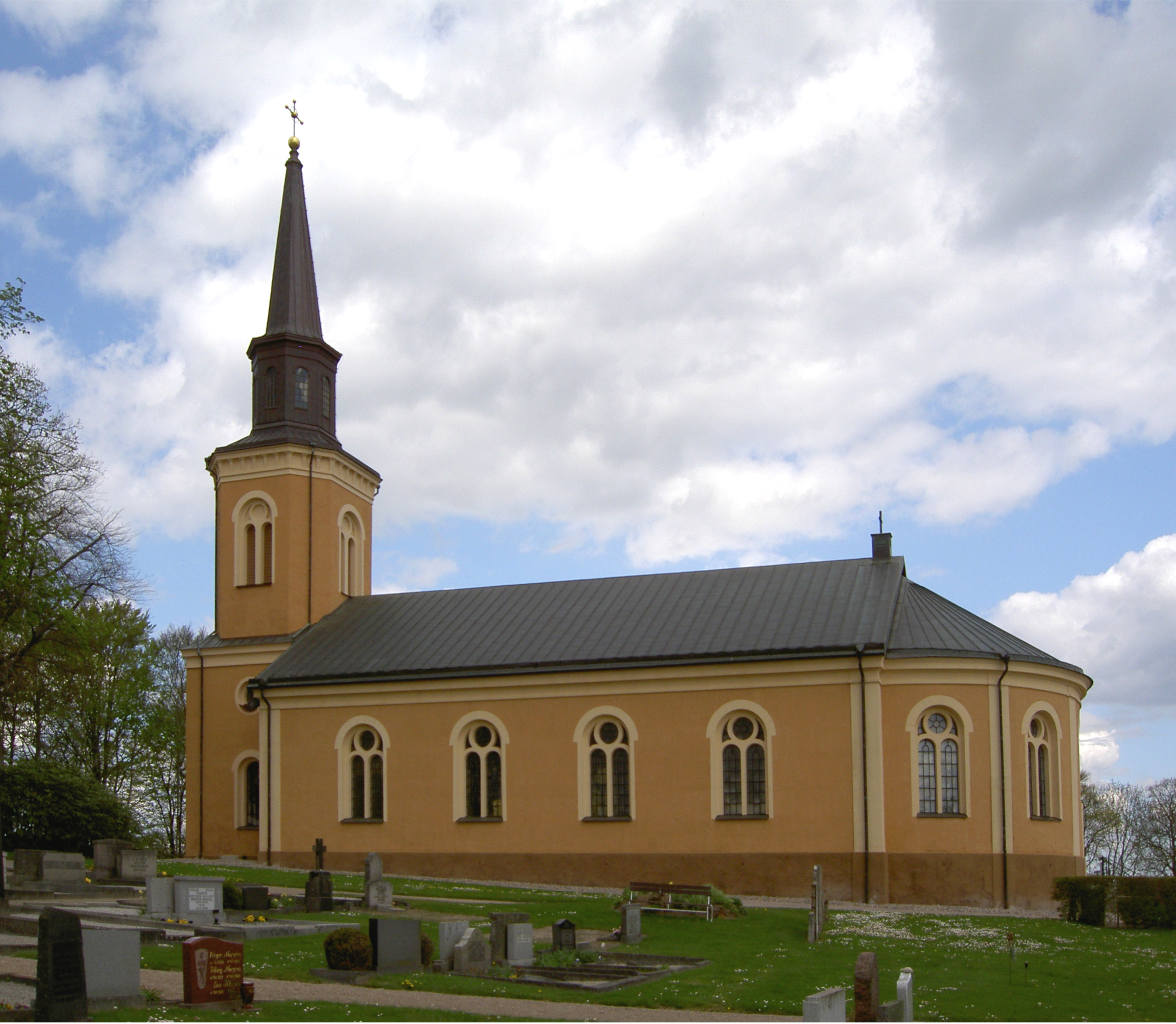

- Location within Scania Location within Sweden Location within European Union
- Coordinates: 56°17′N 13°42′E
- Country: Sweden
- Province: Scania
- County: Scania County
- Municipality: Hässleholm Municipality

Area
  - Total: 3.64 km^{2} (1.41 sq mi)

Population (31 December 2010)
  - Total: 2,674
  - Density: 735/km^{2} (1,900/sq mi)
- Time zone: UTC+1 (CET)
  - Summer (DST): UTC+2 (CEST)

Bjärnum is a locality situated in Hässleholm Municipality, Scania County, Sweden with 2,674 inhabitants in 2010.
