= Creative Vibes =

Australian independent record label

- Founded: 1994
- Founder: Gordon Henderson; Heidi Pasqual; Peter Pasqual
- Defunct: 2009
- Country of origin: Australia
- Location: Sydney
- Official website: Creative Vibes

Creative Vibes was a record label that sourced, signed and released local Australian acts. It also licensed material from overseas and imported CDs and vinyl from around the world and had its own sales and distribution arm.

Creative Vibes was nominated for 'Best Independent Label' at the Australian Dance Music Awards (DMA's), between 2000 and 2004, winning the award in 2000 and 2002.

A number of Creative Vibes artists have been nominated for ARIA Awards including Gotye (2006 – 'Best Independent Release' : Like Drawing Blood; 2007 – 'Best Dance Release', 'Best Independent Release', 'Album of the Year' & 'Best Male Artist': Mixed Blood), James Muller (2006 – 'Best Jazz Artist' : Kaboom), Mike Nock & Dave Liebman (2007 – 'Best Jazz Album' : Duologue), Joseph And James Tawadros (2006 – 'Best World Album' : Visions). At the 2006 AIR Chart Awards Gotye's album Like Drawing Blood won 'Most Outstanding Independent Artist' and in 2007 Mixed Blood was nominated 'Best Independent Artist'.

In December 2008, the label announced it was ceasing operations. They said "We're hugely proud of the work we've done over the past decade and a half. Sadly though, as a truly independent company we just can't compete with large companies and multinational companies supplying everything from music to computers and electrical items, to give retailers what they now need to stay in business and sell good music at the same time."

== Artists ==
- Alphamama
- Bitrok
- Cosmo Jarvis
- Def Wish Cast
- DJ Soup
- Ellesquire
- Enola Fall
- Feline Down
- Gotye
- Laneous & the Family Yah
- Master of Ribongia (signed to October Records in 2014)
- M.S.D.
- Pear & the Awkward Orchestra
- Rockets
- Teinne
- The Bird
- The Upskirts
- True Vibenation

== See also ==
- List of record labels
