= Shout Out Louds =

Swedish indie pop/rock band

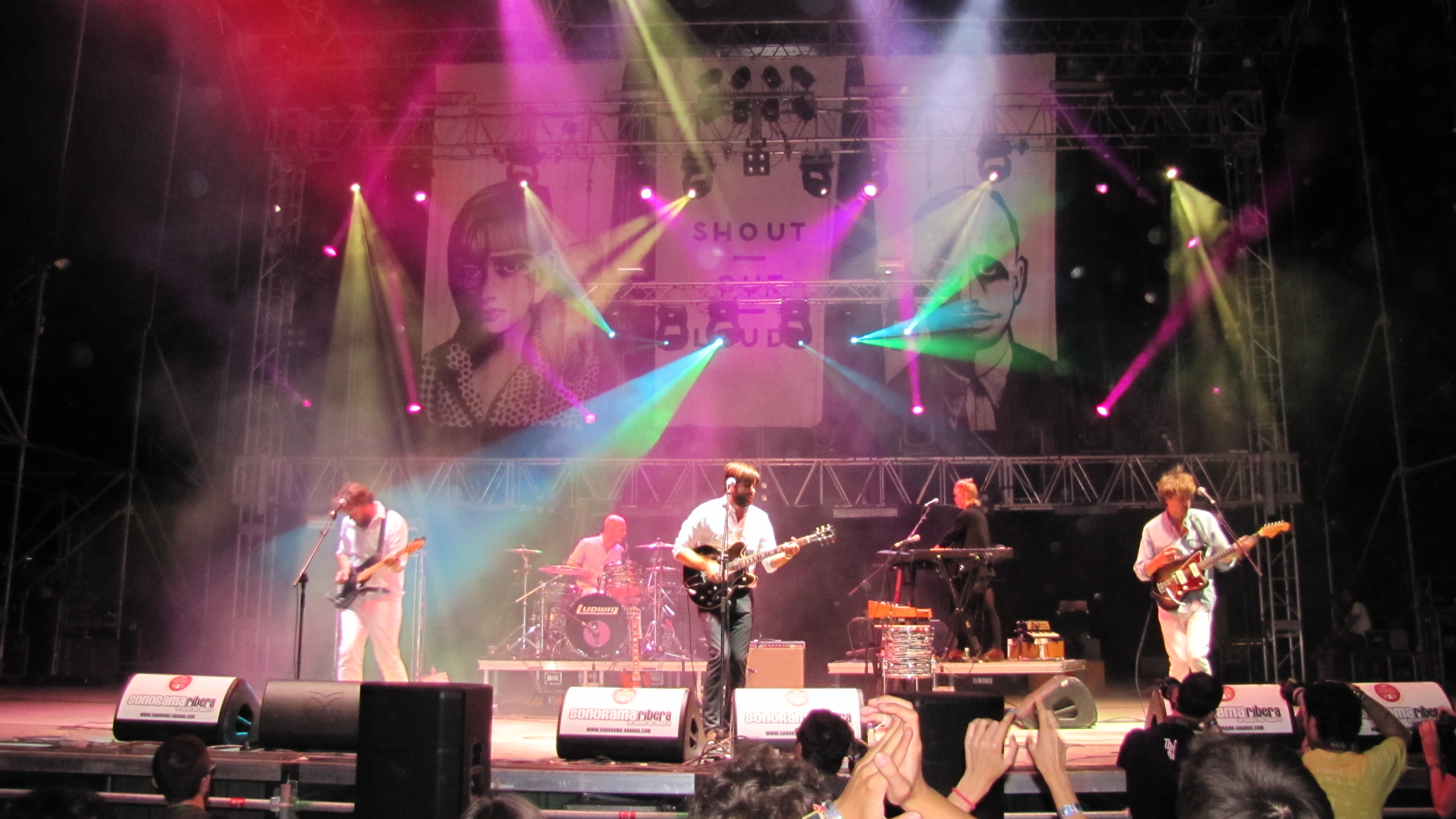
- Shout Out Louds performing at Sonorama Ribera festival 2011

Background information
- Origin: Stockholm, Sweden
- Genres: Indie pop; indie rock; alternative rock
- Years active: 2001–present
- Labels: Bud Fox (Sweden); Merge (US); Weekender (UK); Dew Process (Australia/New Zealand)
- Members: Eric Edman; Ted Malmros; Adam Olenius; Bebban Stenborg; Carl von Arbin
- Website: shoutoutlouds.com

Shout Out Louds is a Swedish indie pop band from Stockholm.

== History ==
Formed in Stockholm by childhood friends Adam Olenius (vocals), Ted Malmros (bass), and Carl von Arbin (guitars), Shout Out Louds found an international audience during the early 2000s with their peppy Swedish pop. The lineup began taking shape in 2001, with drummer Eric Edman and keyboardist Bebban Stenborg climbing aboard shortly thereafter. Shout Out Louds wasted little time writing songs, the first three of which formed the basis of their first demo tape. The music caught the ear of Filip Wilén, owner of Sweden's Bud Fox Recordings, and he quickly signed the group to his label. Shout Out Louds then spent the majority of 2002 writing more songs, and December found them recording their debut EP, 100°, which was released in 2003. The group's high-energy, ultra-melodic sound was in place from the very beginning.

The band toured Sweden and Scandinavia in support of 100°, whose release was followed by two singles, "Hurry Up Let's Go" and "Shut Your Eyes." In October 2003, the group released its first album, Howl Howl Gaff Gaff, to great acclaim in Sweden. The band spent the following year touring, releasing additional material ("Please Please Please," "Very Loud/Wish I Was Dead," and the Oh, Sweetheart EP), and inking an American deal with Capitol Records. The U.S. version of Howl Howl Gaff Gaff was released in May 2005, featuring songs from the Swedish release plus some early singles and EP tracks. A tour of the U.S. with indie darlings the Dears helped boost the band's profile, as did airplay on The O.C. Despite such growing success, the band's 2007 album "Our Ill Wills" produced by Björn Yttling was a somber, melancholy affair, replete with icy synths and Cure-inspired vocals. Another round of tour dates kept the bandmates busy until mid-2008, at which point they decided to take a half-year hiatus. March 2009 found the musicians reconvening in Stockholm to write new material, and by August the band had decamped to Seattle to begin recording with producer Phil Ek. Their third album, Work, arrived in early 2010. After coming home from a tour to support the album, the band members felt that a change in the way they worked was in order. Hoping to recapture the more relaxed spirit of earlier recordings, they spent time outside the studio composing the songs, with each band member responsible for coming up with their own parts. When they came back together, the band produced their next record themselves (with help from Johannes Berglund) in a small Stockholm studio. Optica was released by Merge in early 2013. The next few years saw a handful of solo releases from both Olenius and from Stenborg's Astropol project. Regrouping in Stockholm, the Shout Out Louds returned with 2017's more guitar-oriented Ease My Mind.

== Band members ==
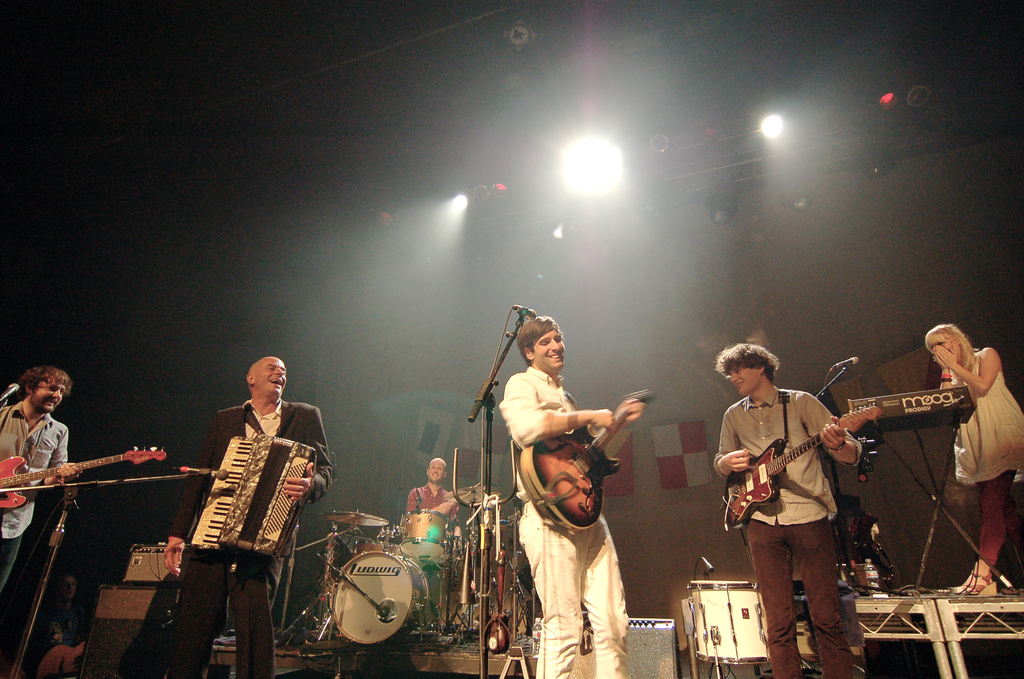
The band in 2007

- Adam Olenius – lead vocals, guitars
- Ted Malmros – bass, percussion, backing vocals
- Carl von Arbin – guitars, backing vocals
- Eric Edman – drums, percussion
- Bebban Stenborg – keyboards, synthesizers, accordion, glockenspiel, backing and occasional lead vocals

== Discography ==
=== Studio albums ===
Album Title	Album details	Peak chart positions					
Album Title	Album details	SWE	AUT	GER	SWI	US	US Heat
Howl Howl Gaff Gaff	Released: 1 October 2003; Label: BMG Sweden; Format: CD	35	—	—	—	—	—
Our Ill Wills	Released: 25 April 2007; Label: SME Sweden; Format: CD	9	—	—	—	—	7
Work	Released: 23 February 2010; Label: SME Sweden; Format: CD	21	—	30	76	200	5
Optica	Released: 26 February 2013; Label: SME Sweden; Format: CD	12	51	55	91	—	8
Ease My Mind	Released: 22 September 2017; Label: Merge; Format: CD	—	—	—	—	—	—
House	Released: 18 February 2022; Label: Bud Fox Recordings; Format: CD	—	—	—	—	—	—

=== EPs ===
- 100° EP (2003)
- Oh, Sweetheart EP (2004)
- Very Loud EP (2004)
- Combines EP (Remixes) (2006)

=== Singles ===
Year	Title	Peak chart positions									Album
Year	Title	SWE	GER	POR	SCO	SWI	UK	UK Indie	US Sales	US Dance	Album
2003	"100°"	30	—	—	—	—	—	—	—	—	100° EP
2003	"Hurry Up Let's Go"	—	—	—	—	—	—	—	—	—	100° EP
2003	"Shut Your Eyes"	44	—	—	—	—	—	—	—	—	Howl Howl Gaff Gaff
2004	"Please Please Please"	—	—	—	41	—	53	—	—	—	Howl Howl Gaff Gaff
2004	"Oh Sweetheart"	43	—	—	—	—	—	—	—	—	Howl Howl Gaff Gaff
2004	"Very Loud"	—	—	—	75	—	110	—	23	—	Howl Howl Gaff Gaff
2005	"The Comeback"	—	—	—	50	—	63	—	—	—	Howl Howl Gaff Gaff
2007	"Tonight I Have to Leave It"	—	—	3	—	—	—	33	8	4	Our Ill Wills
2008	"Impossible"	—	—	—	—	—	—	—	15	5	Our Ill Wills
2010	"Walls"	—	—	—	—	—	—	—	—	—	Work
2010	"Fall Hard"	—	70	—	—	—	—	—	—	—	Work
2012	"Blue Ice"	—	—	—	—	—	—	—	—	—	Optica
2013	"Walking in Your Footsteps"	—	—	—	—	99	—	—	—	—	Optica
2013	"Illusions"	—	—	—	—	—	—	—	—	—	Optica
2017	"Oh Oh"	—	—	—	—	—	—	—	—	—	Ease My Mind
2017	"Jumbo Jet"	—	—	—	—	—	—	—	—	—	Ease My Mind
2017	"Porcelain"	—	—	—	—	—	—	—	—	—	Ease My Mind
2018	"In New Europe"	—	—	—	—	—	—	—	—	—	Non-album single
2018	"Up the Hill"	—	—	—	—	—	—	—	—	—	Non-album single
2019	"Blue Christmas"	—	—	—	—	—	—	—	—	—	A Merge Holiday Album
2021	"As Far Away as Possible"	—	—	—	—	—	—	—	—	—	Non-album singles
2021	"High as a Kite"	—	—	—	—	—	—	—	—	—	Non-album singles
"—" denotes single that did not chart or was not released

=== Compilations ===
- SXSW: The Best of the West EP (15 March 2005) – "Never Ever"
- DRIVE XV: A Tribute to Automatic for the People (2 October 2008) – "Man on the Moon"
