= Godmothers Bookstore =

Independent Bookstore

Godmothers is an independent bookstore and gathering space in Summerland, California, founded in 2024 by Jennifer Rudolph Walsh and Victoria Jackson. The store serves as a literary and cultural hub, hosting author talks, workshops, and community events. Vanity Fair noted its connection to high-profile visitors, including Meghan, Duchess of Sussex.

== Description ==
Named by Oprah Winfrey, the bookstore serves as a space for literature, community events, and creative engagement. It features a dedicated children's section and a selection of books spanning literature, belles-lettres, memoir, science, nature, mindfulness, art, architecture, fashion, design, and cooking, including limited editions and collectible titles. In addition to books, the store offers sideline items from both local and international makers.

Godmothers hosts a variety of literary and cultural events, including author conversations, artistic workshops, weekly children's storytime sessions, mahjong gatherings, book clubs, and community events. Its main-stage discussions, featuring authors and notable guests, are supported by a professional production system. Past speakers have included Nicole Avant, Josh Brolin, Johann Hari, Elise Loehnen, Rob Lowe, Lisa See, Lauren Sánchez, Jennifer Siebel Newsom, and Colm Tóibín.

The bookstore also offers the Founders Circle, a program designed to deepen literary and community engagement through curated events and offerings that foster connection.

Town & Country described Godmothers as "a sanctuary for ideas and creativity", while Goop referred to its design as "a sanctuary for the soul." In October 2024, The Los Angeles Times highlighted its cultural role, calling it "a pilgrimage-worthy place that could function like a town square, where everybody’s welcome." The article also noted its three-day opening weekend, which featured guests including Oprah Winfrey, Ellen DeGeneres, Portia de Rossi, Maria Shriver, and Prince Harry and Meghan Markle, and described its "subtle glamorous rusticity" designed by Martyn Lawrence Bullard.
