= Miva =

Miva may refer to:

- Miva (company), a provider of ecommerce software
  - MIVA Script, a computer scripting language
- Miva, Queensland, a place in Australia
- Midwest Intercollegiate Volleyball Association, an American collegiate club men's volleyball sports league
- Midwestern Intercollegiate Volleyball Association, an American college athletic conference

== See also ==
- Mivar, an Italian company
