= Sorry I'm Late =

Studio album by Cher Lloyd
- Released: 27 May 2014
- Recorded: 2012–2013
- Genre: Pop
- Length: 37:15
- Label: Epic
- Producers: Benny Blanco; Marco "Mag" Borrero; Johan Carlsson; Jason Evigan; Carl Falk; Oscar "OzGo" Görres; Oscar Holter; Robert Marvin; Ilya; Shellback; Matt Squire; The Struts; Rami Yacoub

Cher Lloyd chronology
Sticks and Stones (2011)	Sorry I'm Late (2014)

Singles from Sorry I'm Late
- 1. "I Wish" Released: 2 September 2013; 2. "Sirens" Released: 17 March 2014

Sorry I'm Late is the second studio album by English singer Cher Lloyd. It was released on 27 May 2014, by Epic Records and Syco Music. Lloyd co-wrote five songs on the album, working with new producers and songwriters such as Beth Ditto and Tove Lo. It is her last album released through Epic and Syco. Primarily a pop record, Sorry I'm Late also contains influences of dancehall and hip-hop.

Sorry I'm Late received generally positive reviews during its US release, with many critics praising Lloyd's personality and vulnerability on the album, and commenting on the maturity in comparison to her debut studio album, Sticks and Stones (2011). The album was preceded by the singles "I Wish" and "Sirens", both of which received equally positive reviews. The album was described as "fun" and "sweet but sharp" by critics. To promote the album, Lloyd embarked on her second headlining concert tour I Wish Tour, and her first by touring North America.

== Background ==
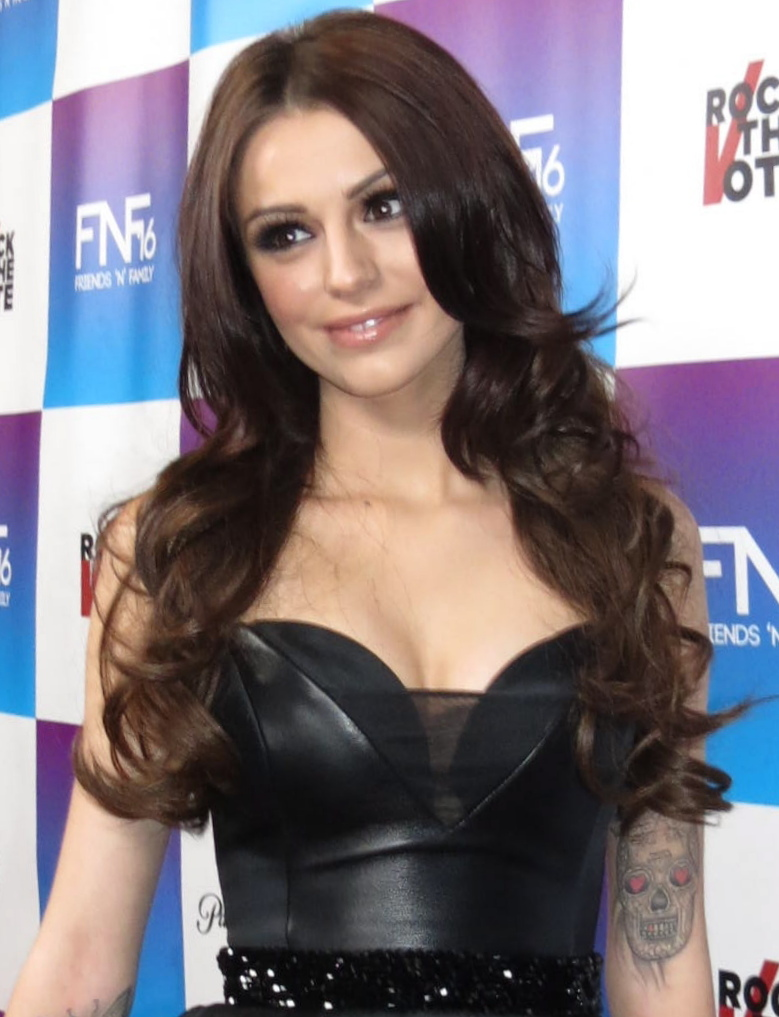
Lloyd in 2013

On 16 October 2013, Lloyd told Billboard that the title of her second studio album is Sorry I'm Late. She explained, "I think it has two meanings. [...] It's been a long time since I've actually done anything new, but for me, it's as a person. I mean, I've spent a whole lot of time trying to figure out who I am, and I think everybody goes through that."

In November 2013, during an interview with Larry King, Lloyd confirmed that she had left Syco Music after she and Cowell disagreed about her career path in music. Lloyd also confirmed that Sorry I'm Late, which was originally due for release in November, was pushed back until early 2014, despite the record being done. She remarked, "My album got pushed back and I'm not happy about it. It's all done, but I am currently in the studio for the rest of this week to try and find some more magic. [...] It was meant to be coming out in November. Now I think it's going to be early next year."

The explicit version of the album artwork depicts Lloyd smoking while sitting in a bathtub; censored pressings of the record remove the smoke. On 20 May 2014, one week before the release, Lloyd made the album available for online stream on MTV.com. For the album, Lloyd worked with Beth Ditto and Tove Lo. In a July 2014 interview with Digital Spy, Lloyd spoke on being told by L.A. Reid to go back into the studio and create more "magic". She stated, "I think that sometimes the industry can panic and you have to be ready to take a risk, you know. If you're not taking a risk then what you have is boring. You do need to go in and find your magic. I've taken many risks on this album and I didn't need to find any more magic, the album was done, ready and it's a bit of a pain in the arse that it got delayed. It's only my fans that suffer, and they have to wait longer for it. So it should have been brought out earlier."

== Promotion ==
=== Tour ===
Lloyd confirmed that she would be playing 34 shows across North America on the I Wish Tour as part of the album's promotion. She began on 6 September 2013 in Washington, D.C. and concluded in Orlando, Florida on 24 May 2014. Opening acts include Fifth Harmony, Zara Larsson, and Jackson Guthy. During the tour Lloyd performed new songs except "Killin' It" and "Alone with Me".

=== Spotify and YouTube ===
Before the album release, five songs were released on Spotify and YouTube. It started out with "Sirens", and the song picture featured a piece of the album artwork. This continued with "Dirty Love", "Human", "Bind Your Love" and "M.F.P.O.T.Y." where each song revealed more of the artwork.

== Singles ==
The album's lead single, "I Wish", featuring guest vocals from American rapper T.I. premiered on 31 August 2013 after being leaked two days earlier. It was officially released on 2 September 2013. The song received mostly positive reviews and reached the top 40 in Australia and peaked at 16 in New Zealand. It failed to reach the top 100 in either the United Kingdom or the United States. "I Wish"'s music video, directed by Gil Green, was released onto Vevo on 24 September 2013.

The second single, "Sirens", premiered on 14 March 2014 on American radio station Sirius XM Hits 1 and was released 17 March 2014, along with the digital pre-order of Sorry I'm Late. The song has received critical acclaim from music critics. A music video for the song premiered on 29 April 2014.

=== Promotional singles ===
"Dirty Love" premiered on 28 March 2014 as the album's first promotional single. "Human" was released as the second promotional single on 11 April 2014. "Bind Your Love", the album's third promotional single, was released on 27 April 2014. "M.F.P.O.T.Y." was released as the fourth and final promotional single on 11 May 2014; it was, however, leaked online on 1 May 2014.

== Critical reception ==
Professional ratings
Review scores
Source	Rating
ABC	3.5/5 stars
AllMusic	4/5 stars
Idolator	3.5/5 stars
Popdust	4/5 stars

Upon its release, Sorry I'm Late received positive reviews from music critics, with praise being aimed at the maturity of the album's content and Lloyd's musical direction. Idolator awarded the album 3.5/5, stating "Sorry I'm Late may have really been worth the wait. While it's still that fresh and carefree pop music that's sure to be on every tween's playlist this summer, it does have elements that show Lloyd as a blossoming young woman". They further praised the album's lyrical content, saying "There are a number of tracks here that show Cher's growth and maturity. The lyrics show that's she's not just about crushing on the boy next door and hanging with her girls", labeling Sirens, Sweet Despair and Goodnight as highlights of the album. AllMusic also praised the album, awarded it a 4/5. They said the album "finds the former British X-Factor contestant maturing just enough from her 2011 debut to show growth, while still retaining all of her bright, infectious pop sensibilities". They closed their review by stating "in the 21st century world of extreme pop divas and powerhouse productions action-packed with hooks, beats, and hashtagged lyrical content, Lloyd comes off as a natural, a likeable girl next door with a queen-sized attitude and voice to match".

ABC also praised the album, awarding it 3.5/5 and praising the tracks "Human", "Sweet Despair" and "Bind Your Love". They stated "Lloyd is an exploding charismatic firework of a performer and she carries this album to a new level. It is evident that she will get even better with each album she makes. Given her progress thus far, we now know she can achieve giant leaps", and closed their review by saying "This is a bit more than a guilty pleasure. Cher Lloyd has emerged for a victory lap". Jason Scott of Popdust awarded the album a 4/5, stating that it "could very well curve the mainstream in a refreshing new direction". He also heavily praised "Sirens", calling the track "one of the finest releases of the year, any genre" and closed his review by stating "Fans couldn't ask for more on a project that sees one of the most promising rising stars shed her former bubblegum self and find a more mature, complex sound. Her (new) voice is loud and clear" and labelled "Sirens", "Human", "I Wish" and "Killin' It" as the best tracks. Time magazine also praised the album, saying that it "abandons what made her polarizing without losing what makes her interesting". They closed their review by stating "Though Lloyd has access to some of the top producers in pop, she hasn't delivered the kind of inescapable hit required for her to be added to the A list. (She comes very close on "Sirens" and the uplifting "Human.") But then again, she may not need to. With a very young fan base as devoted as hers is, she has a sizable core audience already in place".

== Commercial performance ==
On 20 May 2014, Nielsen SoundScan released their Building Chart, which projected the album to debut at number nine on the Billboard 200. The album eventually debuted at number 12, on the charting week of 4 June 2014, with first-week sales of 17,000. As of December 2014, Sorry I'm Late has sold 41,000 copies in the US.

The album was released two months later in the United Kingdom and Ireland. The album peaked at number 58 on the Irish Albums Chart, while it spent one week on the UK Albums Chart at number 21.

== Track listing ==
Standard edition
No.	Title	Writer(s)	Producer(s)	Length
1.	"Just Be Mine"	Benjamin Levin; Shellback; Mike Posner	Benny Blanco; Shellback	3:15
2.	"Bind Your Love"	Ina Wroldsen; Rami Yacoub; Carl Falk; Shellback	Yacoub; Falk; Shellback	3:36
3.	"I Wish" (featuring T.I.)	Shellback; Ilya; Savan Kotecha; Oscar Görres; Clifford Harris Jr.	Shellback; Ilya; OzGo	3:32
4.	"Sirens"	Wroldsen; Yacoub; Falk	Yacoub; Falk	3:55
5.	"Dirty Love"	Cher Lloyd; Shellback; Max Martin; Kotecha; Ludvig Söderberg; Jakob Jerlström	The Struts; Shellback	3:18
6.	"Human"	LP; Catt Gravitt; Robert Marvin	Robert Marvin; Gravitt^{[a]}	3:29
7.	"Sweet Despair"	Lloyd; Jason Evigan; Beth Ditto	Evigan	3:17
8.	"Killin' It"	Lloyd; Shellback; Söderberg; Jerlström; Tove Nilsson; Kotecha	The Struts; Shellback	2:54
9.	"Goodnight"	Lloyd; Johan Carlsson; Matt Squire; Emily Wright	Squire; J. Carlsson; Wright^{[b]}	3:25
10.	"M.F.P.O.T.Y."	Lloyd; J. Carlsson; Kotecha; Marco Borrero	J. Carlsson; Mag; Kotecha^{[b]}; Peter Carlsson^{[b]}	3:16
11.	"Alone with Me"	Shellback; Oscar Holter; Kotecha	Holter; Shellback	3:18
Total length:				37:15

Notes

- ^{^[a]} signifies an additional vocal producer
- ^{^[b]} signifies a vocal producer

== Personnel ==
Credits for Sorry I'm Late adapted from AllMusic.

- Cory Bice – assistant
- Benny Blanco – instrumentation, producer, programming
- Dan Book – background vocals
- Stephen Bradley – trumpet
- Tofer Brown – electric guitar
- Johan Carlsson – engineer, guitar, musician, producer, vocal engineer, vocal producer
- Peter Carlsson – engineer, vocal producer
- Tom Coyne – mastering
- Jason Evigan – engineer, producer, background vocals
- Eric Eylands – assistant
- Carl Falk – engineer, guitar, musician, producer, programming, vocal arrangement, vocal editing
- Nikki Flores – background vocals
- Kristoffer Fogelmark – vocal editing
- Livvi Frank – background vocals
- Serban Ghenea – mixing
- Larry Goetz – acoustic guitar
- GoMillion – photography
- Oscar Görres – guitar, keyboards, producer
- Catt Gravitt – vocal producer
- John Hanes – mixing engineer
- Jeri Heiden – art direction, design
- Oscar Holter – keyboards, producer, programming
- Michael Ilbert – engineer
- Corky James – guitar
- JP Robinson – creative director
- Rouble Kapoor – engineer
- Savan Kotecha – vocal producer
- Spyke Lee – assistant
- Dennis Leupold – photography
- Cher Lloyd – primary artist
- LP – ukulele
- Andrew Luftman – production coordination
- Mag – engineer, producer, programming, synthesizer, vocal producer
- Max Martin – background vocals
- Robert Marvin – engineer, musician, producer
- Gabriel McNair – trombone
- Albin Nedler – vocal editing
- Noah Passovoy – engineer
- Rami – bass, engineer, musician, producer, programming, vocal arrangement, vocal editing
- Tim Roberts – mixing assistant
- Chris Sclafani – engineer
- Kyle Shearer – programming
- Paul Shearer – acoustic guitar
- Shellback – bass, engineer, guitar, instrumentation, keyboards, musician, producer, programming, vocals, background vocals
- Matt Squire – engineer, musician, producer
- Nick Steinhardt – art direction, design
- Marlene Strand – background vocals
- The Struts – keyboards, producer, programming, background vocals
- T.I. – featured artist
- Isaiah Tejada – programming
- Emily Wright – engineer, vocal producer
- Scott "Yarmov" Yarmovsky – production coordination

== Charts ==
Chart (2014)	Peak position
Australian Albums (ARIA)	23
Belgian Albums (Ultratop Flanders)	103
Belgian Albums (Ultratop Wallonia)	114
Canadian Albums (Billboard)	16
Dutch Albums (Album Top 100)	94
Irish Albums (IRMA)	58
Mexican Albums (Top 100)	52
New Zealand Albums (RMNZ)	26
Scottish Albums (Official Charts)	24
Spanish Albums (Promusicae)	52
UK Albums (Official Charts)	21
US Billboard 200	12

== Release history ==
Region	Date	Format	Edition	Label	Ref.
Australia	27 May 2014	Digital download; CD	Standard	Epic Records	
New Zealand	27 May 2014	Digital download; CD	Standard	Epic Records	
Japan	27 May 2014	Digital download; CD	Standard	Epic Records	
South Africa	27 May 2014	Digital download; CD	Standard	Epic Records	
Mexico	27 May 2014	Digital download; CD	Standard	Epic Records	
Sweden	27 May 2014	Digital download; CD	Standard	Epic Records	
United States	27 May 2014	Digital download; CD	Standard; Deluxe	Epic Records	
Japan	25 June 2014	Digital download; CD	Deluxe	Epic Records	
United Kingdom	25 July 2014	Digital download; CD	Standard	Epic Records	
