= Victoria Jackson (disambiguation) =

Victoria Jackson may refer to:

- Victoria Jackson (born 1959), actress
- Victoria Jackson (entrepreneur) (born 1955), cosmetics entrepreneur

== See also ==
- Victoria Jackson-Stanley (born 1953), politician
