= Seb Bishop =

British businessman and entrepreneur (born 1974)

- Born: 1974 (age 51–52)
- Education: Highgate School
- Occupations: businessman and entrepreneur

Seb Bishop (born April 1974) is a British businessman. He is the CEO and Creative Director of Summerill & Bishop, a London-based tableware company. Bishop has previously held positions at several technology and lifestyle companies, including CEO of GOOP and International CEO of (PRODUCT) RED.

== Biography ==
Bishop began his career in advertising at age 14 during summer holidays at Yellowhammer, and joined Publicis as an Art Director at age 19. He later worked at Rainey Kelly Campbell Roalfe (RKCR) during their acquisition of Y&R London. During his advertising career, Bishop worked on campaigns for brands including Virgin, Coca-Cola, Renault, and Nintendo, including the campaign that launched Coca-Cola in Russia.

Bishop was educated at Highgate School.

== Business Ventures ==
=== Espotting and MIVA ===
In 2000, at age 26, Bishop co-founded Espotting with school-friend Daniel Ishag, a search marketing company that introduced pay-per-click advertising to Europe. The company expanded across Europe, powering search engines including Yahoo, Ask Jeeves, Lycos and AltaVista. In June 2004, Espotting merged with US-based FindWhat.com in a transaction valued at $186 million. Following the merger, Bishop served as President and Chief Marketing Officer of the combined company, which was rebranded as MIVA in 2005 and traded on NASDAQ under the symbol MIVA.

=== (PRODUCT) RED ===
Bishop joined (PRODUCT) RED as International CEO in September 2008. (PRODUCT) RED, co-founded by Bono and Bobby Shriver, partners with companies to raise funds for The Global Fund to Fight AIDS, Tuberculosis and Malaria. During his tenure, the organization worked with partners including Nike, GAP, American Express, Amazon, Apple, and Starbucks. According to the organization, (PRODUCT) RED partners have generated over $650 million for the Global Fund.

=== Goop ===
Bishop was CEO of Goop from 2011 to 2014. Working with founder Gwyneth Paltrow, he oversaw the company's development from a weekly newsletter to a commercialized publishing and e-commerce business. Bishop's stated purpose at Goop was "merging the worlds of publishing and e-commerce." Under his leadership, the company expanded from two employees to multiple teams operating in London and Los Angeles. His business strategy focused on developing collaborations with high-profile brands before Goop began creating its own product lines.

=== Summerill & Bishop ===
Bishop joined the tableware company Summerill & Bishop as CEO and Creative Director in 2014 following the death of his mother, Bernadette Bishop, who had co-founded the company with June Summerill. The company operates stores in London's Notting Hill and Belgravia and supplies products to retailers including Harrods, Selfridges, Fortnum & Mason and Lane Crawford. Under Bishop's leadership, the company has collaborated with establishments and brands including Claridge's, Gleneagles, John Derian, The River Café, La Colombe d’Or, Luke Edward Hall, Skye Gyngell, Shrimps, and Club 55.

== Other Activities ==
In 2007, Bishop appeared in Channel 4 documentary Millionaires' Mission, in which British business leaders spent three weeks in a remote region of Uganda working on community development projects. He helped establish a farmer's cooperative and an eco-tourism hotel called Teach Inn.

Bishop has made investments in several companies, including early-stage investment in swimwear brand Orlebar Brown, which was later acquired by Chanel. He was Chairman of Steak, a digital marketing agency started by his brother, Oliver Bishop, with two ex-Espotting colleagues, Julian Walker and Duncan Parry. Steak was sold to the agency group Dentsu in 2011.

Since 2014, Bishop has been a board member of Grassroot Soccer, an organization that uses football to provide health education to young people. He chairs the organization's annual World AIDS Day Gala and corporate football tournament fundraising events in the UK.

Bishop was selected as a Young Global Leader by the World Economic Forum and has been a board advisor to EARNT since 2020.

== Awards ==
- Campaign Magazine "Faces to Watch" (1998)
- Media Week "30 Under 30" (2002)
- Media & Marketing Europe "40 Under 40" (2002)
- Financial Times "Top 50" Creative Businesses (2004)
- Campaign Magazine "A-List" (2005)
- London Stock Exchange "Technology Entrepreneur of the Year" finalist (2005)
