= Homicide for the Holidays =

American television series

- Genre: True crime Docudrama
- Country of origin: United States
- Original language: English
- No. of seasons: 4
- No. of episodes: 22

Original release
- Network: Oxygen
- Release: December 3, 2016 – present

Related
- Snapped

Homicide for the Holidays is an American television series which airs during the Thanksgiving/Christmas holiday season each year on the Oxygen Network. The program details crimes committed during the holidays and is narrated by Chris Hansen

== Production ==
Homicide for the Holidays first aired on December 3, 2016 with the episode, "A Deadly Thanksgiving". It was not renewed for the 2020 holiday season. However, it returned on December 6, 2021, with the episode "The Last Thanksgiving," about the brutal murders of Joel and Lisa Guy. The new episodes will air for a limited run from December 6-Ongoing. On June 17, 2023, additional new episodes aired featuring homicides that take place on or close to the Fourth Of July, beginning with the episode "Red, White, And Blood." On October 13, 2023, the show aired the episode "The Big Bad Wolf," about Michael Dennis' murder of Doreen Erbert. The series returned on November 10, 2023, with the episode "Recipe For Murder." As of November 2025, 4 new episodes are airing on Oxygen on November 27- marking the series’ return after a year hiatus.

== Episodes ==
=== Series overview ===
Season	Episodes	Originally released	
Season	Episodes	First released	Last released
1	4	December 3, 2016	December 17, 2016
2	8	November 25, 2017	December 23, 2018
3	4	December 7, 2019	December 28, 2019
4	8	December 6, 2021	November 25, 2022
5	TBD	June 17, 2023	

=== Season 1 (2016) ===
No. overall	No. in season	Title	Original release date
1	1	"A Deadly Thanksgiving"	December 3, 2016
Paul murders four members of his family after a Thanksgiving dinner out of jealousy.
2	2	"Christmas Carnage in Carnation"	December 3, 2016
The bodies of six members of the Anderson family are discovered the day after Christmas in 2007. The culprits are closer to home than anyone realizes.
3	3	"A Christmas Massacre"	December 10, 2016
Several members of the Ortega family are murdered by a man in a Santa Claus costume who also sets their house on fire. Later, a man is found dead miles away. Investigators uncover the shocking reason for all these deaths.
4	4	"A Christmas Morning Murder"	December 17, 2016
Who killed a couple on Christmas Day, and why? Could it be a home invasion, or is the murder more personal?

=== Season 2 (2017 - 2018) ===
No. overall	No. in season	Title	Original release date
5	1	"Thanks-killing"	November 25, 2017
When Earl and Terry Robertson are murdered just before Thanksgiving, investigators discover the prime suspect is very close to home.
6	2	"Holiday Terror"	December 2, 2017
Harry Mapps kills a family of three as an act of vengeance.
7	3	"Christmas Mourning"	December 9, 2017
Bob and Idella Young have been murdered at Christmas time.
8	4	"New Year's Evil"	December 16, 2017
An elderly couple and their grandson are brutally murdered. When the truth about the triple homicide is revealed, the motive shocks both relatives and investigators.
9	5	"Christmas Rampage"	December 23, 2017
Ronald Gene Simmons embarks on a deadly shooting spree, killing an ex-coworker, a stranger, and fourteen family members.
10	6	"Christmas Rager"	December 9, 2018
When a mother is strangled to death, both of the men in her life become suspects.
11	7	"Silent Night, Lethal Night"	December 16, 2018
A mother and two daughters are murdered by a man with revenge on his mind.
12	8	"Bloody New Years"	December 23, 2018
Seven members of a Vietnamese family are massacred just before New Year's Eve. Then the killer murders another, bringing the body count to eight. Who did this, and why?

=== Season 3 (2019) ===
No. overall	No. in season	Title	Original release date
13	1	"Thanksgiving Terror"	December 7, 2019
Sara Tokars is shot in front of her own sons. Who planned this brutal murder, and why?
14	2	"Last Christmas"	December 14, 2019
When a couple is murdered in Gateway, Florida during the holiday season, investigators search for a motive.
15	3	"Christmas Heartbreak"	December 21, 2019
Jack and Elaine Denney are murdered on Christmas Day 2007. It takes investigators ten long years to find the killer.
16	4	"Death In Santa Claus"	December 28, 2019
When three of the Daniels sisters are discovered wandering down the road, they reveal they were kidnapped by Jerry Scott Heidler. Further investigation leads to the discovery that Heidler murdered the rest of the Daniels family.

=== Season 4 (2021-2022) ===
No. overall	No. in season	Title	Original release date	Viewers (millions)
17	1	"The Last Thanksgiving"	December 6, 2021	0.246
Joel and Lisa Guy have been murdered by beheading, disemboweling and cutting heart out after a Thanksgiving dinner. When investigators learn the identity of the culprit, it's a shock no one will ever get over.
18	2	"Six Slays of Christmas"	December 7, 2021	0.300
The story of the Downtown Posse, a group of youngsters in Dayton, Ohio, who kill people for money during the holiday season of 1992.
19	3	"Killing of the Christmas Tree Farmers"	December 8, 2021	0.273
Ed and Minnie Maurin are murdered by the Riffe brothers after the siblings force them to withdraw a large amount of money from the bank.
20	4	"Murder Under the Mistletoe"	December 9, 2021	N/A
When a woman is brutally murdered, her friends and family discover a romantic triangle, meaning that either her current boyfriend or her ex-husband committed the crime.
21	5	"Halloween Horror"	October 7, 2022	N/A
In Sandusky, Ohio, B.J Liske slaughters three members of his own family on Halloween 2010.
22	6	"All Hallow's Evil"	October 14, 2022	N/A
When Rebekah Gay doesn't show up for work in Mount Pleasant, Michigan, her friends and family immediately become concerned for her well-being.
23	7	"Cold Turkey"	November 18, 2022	N/A
A couple is brutally murdered in their Montgomery, Alabama home after returning from Thanksgiving dinner. Investigators discover that the culprit found a way to travel to their home to commit the double homicide.
24	8	"Silent Night Murders"	November 25, 2022	N/A
A man is suspected of killing his own brother and his girlfriend, until the man turns out to have been killed himself, leading to the investigation of a triple homicide.

=== Season 5 (2023) ===
No. overall	No. in season	Title	Original release date	U.S. viewers (millions)
25	1	"Red, White and Blood"	June 17, 2023	N/A
When a young woman goes missing after a July 4th beach party, investigators have few clues to go on until a twist in the case reveals she might be the latest victim of a predator terrorizing the area.
26	2	"Deadly Fourth"	June 23, 2023	N/A
An abandoned car filled with blood leads investigators on the trail of a missing woman and her teenage daughter who never showed up to the family’s July 4th party. When their remains are found in a pond, everyone in their small town is a suspect.
