= Daniels family murders =

1997 mass murder of a family in Santa Claus, Georgia

- Date: December 4, 1997
- Location: Santa Claus, Georgia, U.S.
- Also known as: Santa Claus murders
- Type: Mass murder and mass shooting
- Deaths: Danny Lewis Daniels, 47; Kimberly Denise Daniels, 33; Jessica Noel Daniels, 16; Bryant Edward Daniels, 8
- Convicted: Jerry Scott Heidler
- Verdict: Guilty
- Convictions: Malice murder (x4)
- Sentence: Death

The Daniels family murders, also known as the Santa Claus murders, occurred on December 4, 1997, in Santa Claus, Georgia, United States, when four members of a family were attacked and murdered by 20-year-old Jerry Scott Heidler (born June 9, 1977). On the day of the murders, Heidler broke into the home of the Daniels, and he first used a shotgun to shoot and kill both 47-year-old Danny Daniels and his 33-year-old wife Kim Daniels. Subsequently, Heidler gunned down the couple's eight-year-old son Bryant Daniels, and 16-year-old Jessica Daniels, and kidnapped three other girls, one of whom was later molested by Heidler, from the home. After the authorities got involved, Heidler was arrested and charged with the four murders. He was found guilty of four counts of malice murder and sentenced to death on September 4, 1999. Heidler remains on death row at the Georgia Diagnostic and Classification State Prison as of 2025.

== Murders ==
On December 4, 1997, four members of a local family residing in a town of Santa Claus, Georgia were brutally murdered in a shotgun attack.

Background information revealed that prior to the shootings, 47-year-old Danny Daniels and his 33-year-old wife Kim, who were the patriarch and matriarch of the family, had taken care of foster children from time to time, and in addition to their own four children, the couple also took in several foster children, three of whom were residing in the same house with the family before the incident; Kim herself was also a foster child in the past. One of the foster children previously under the couple's care was Joanne Heidler, and during Joanne's stay with the Daniels family, her brother Jerry Heidler would often come to visit the family and thus became acquainted with them. A few months before the shootings, Heidler also started a relationship with Jessica, the 16-year-old daughter of Kim and Danny.

Heidler stopped visiting the Daniels family after Danny got wind of his daughter's relationship with Heidler, which prompted him to have a conversation with Heidler, leading to the latter to stop visiting them. Several months later, Heidler's girlfriend, who was pregnant with his second son, gave birth, but the child was stillborn, and on December 3, 1997, days after the boy's death, Heidler went to his stillborn son's funeral. Distraught, Heidler left the funeral and in the early hours of December 4, 1997, 20-year-old Jerry Heidler drove to the house of the Daniels family.

Heidler broke into the house through a bathroom window upon his arrival, and retrieved a Remington 1100 semi-automatic shotgun from the family's gun cabinet. He then shot Danny and Kim in their sleep. He proceeded to kill their 8-year-old son, Bryant, with a shot to the head as he slept. Jessica ran to her parents room, and Heidler followed. He shot her in the back of the head, and, realizing Danny was still alive, proceeded to shoot him three more times. After the murders, Heidler kidnapped three of the family's young daughters, but he left behind the two youngest children, a four-year-old boy and a ten-month-old infant. He sexually assaulted one of the girls (who was eight) before abandoning the trio on a rural road in Bacon County. The girls were found by a farmer and returned to authorities, who later discovered the dead bodies. Heidler threw the shotgun in a river, visited his stillborn sons grave, and then went to his mom's house to play video games and fall asleep.

== Arrest and charges ==
Approximately seven hours after the Daniels family murders, Jerry Heidler was arrested for the crime in Alma, Georgia. Upon his arrest, Heidler was charged with four counts of malice murder and three counts of kidnapping.

A Toombs County grand jury formally indicted Heidler with multiple counts of murder, kidnapping, child molestation and other offences in March 1998. On April 2, 1998, the prosecution officially sought the death penalty for Heidler, who pleaded innocent to all four murder charges. Under Georgia state law, the offence of malice murder warrants either life imprisonment or the death penalty. Subsequently, due to the degree of pre-trial publicity, the location of Heidler's trial was changed from Toombs County to Walton County in December 1998.

In July 1999, Heidler sawed through the bars of his cell window and escaped from the Toombs County Jail, where he was detained while pending trial for the Daniels family murders. About 12 hours after his escape, Heidler was arrested after he was spotted in Vidalia, six miles away from the prison he escaped from. Following the escape attempt and re-capture of Heidler, state and local authorities planned to review security measures to prevent similar attempts in the future.

== Trial of Jerry Heidler ==
=== Background ===
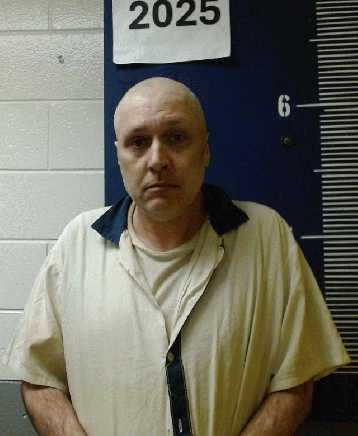
2025 Mugshot of Jerry Scott Heidler

Jerry Scott Heidler was born on June 9, 1977, in the U.S. state of Georgia. As a child, Heidler was placed in foster care due to neglect and poor supervision by his mother, Mary Moseley, and he also suffered from severe abuse from both his stepfather and mother. According to testimonies from Department of Family and Children Services (DFACS) workers painted a disturbing picture of his upbringing — one where threats of voodoo, emotional instability, and dysfunction were commonplace. Heidler reportedly had imaginary friends, self-mutilated, and was twice institutionalized for psychiatric care during his youth. Heidler was also addicted to alcohol at the age of 11. Nearly all of Heidler's siblings were incarcerated for varied offences at the time when Heidler was tried for murdering the Daniels family.

According to both state-appointed and defense psychologists, Heidler suffered from severe borderline personality disorder. One psychologist testified that Heidler exhibited eight of the nine key symptoms of the disorder, including suicide attempts, intense fear of abandonment, and emotional instability, concluding that Heidler had little control over his actions due to a genetic predisposition.

=== Murder trial ===
Court proceedings and submissions

On August 23, 1999, Jerry Heidler officially stood trial before a Walton County jury. The prosecution labelled the murders as "cold" and "methodical", arguing that his motive arose from Danny Daniels's opposition to Heidler's relationship with Jessica Daniels, and sought to prove the guilt of Heidler, while the defence tried to present their case of Heidler as a mentally-ill person and to downplay his guilt on the grounds of diminished responsibility.

During closing submissions, the defense, led by Michael Garrett and Kathy Palmer, pleaded with the jury for compassion. They emphasized Heidler's history of abuse, neglect, and psychological trauma. Garrett implored the jury not to repeat the mistakes of the past, likening the call for Heidler's execution to witch burnings of earlier centuries. The defense leaned heavily on emotional testimony from Heidler's family, former teachers, and social workers to paint a picture of a man who needed psychiatric care, not capital punishment.

In contrast, District Attorney Richard Malone dismissed the notion that Heidler's mental illness excused his crimes. Malone underscored the brutality and premeditated nature of the murders, calling Heidler the personification of "consummate evil". He pointed to Heidler's escape from jail, threats to law enforcement, and possession of weapons behind bars as evidence that Heidler remained a danger to society. Malone also described how Heidler's actions not only devastated the Daniels family but scarred the town of Santa Claus — a place once known for its joyful name — forever associating it with tragedy.

Verdict

On September 2, 1999, after deliberating the case for 20 minutes, the jury found Heidler guilty on all 11 counts, including the murders of Danny, Kim, Jessica, and Bryant Daniels, the kidnapping of three daughters, and the sexual assault of one. The jury rejected the defense's plea to consider Heidler "guilty but mentally ill".

On September 4, 1999, the jury returned with their verdict on sentence, and unanimously sentenced 22-year-old Jerry Heidler to death for each of the four murders. Apart from the four death sentences, Heidler was also handed two life sentences for the kidnapping and sodomy charges, and 110 more years for the remaining crimes. Superior Court Judge Walter C. McMillan Jr. gave Heidler the maximum sentence on all counts and set his execution date for between October 1 and 8, 1999, though the sentence would automatically be appealed to the Georgia Supreme Court.

According to reports, Heidler broke down in tears after the sentence was read, which was the first time he ever showed any emotion during his murder trial. Jurors were visibly emotional as well, with many in tears as they delivered the death sentence. Jury foreman James Burrows read a statement on behalf of the jury, expressing how the case had deeply affected them and how they had prayed for guidance in reaching their decision. For the Daniels family's loved ones, the verdict brought some sense of closure. While they expressed sorrow for Heidler's family, they believed justice had been served. As Kim Daniels's sister put it, "He did what he did for no reason, and I feel he needs to pay for it."

== Appeals and death row ==
In May 2000, eight months after he was condemned to death row, Jerry Heidler filed an appeal to the Georgia Supreme Court against his murder conviction and death sentences. On October 2, 2000, the Georgia Supreme Court dismissed Heidler's appeal and also denied his lawyer's request for a new trial.

On February 24, 2014, Heidler's appeal was rejected by Chief Judge Lisa Godbey Wood of a Georgia federal district court.

On December 12, 2019, U.S. District Judge William Theodore Moore Jr. dismissed Heidler's federal appeal.

On August 2, 2023, the 11th Circuit Court of Appeals turned down Heidler's appeal.

On May 20, 2024, Heidler's final appeal was denied by the U.S. Supreme Court, therefore designating his eligibility to be executed on a date to be determined.

Heidler remains on death row at the Georgia Diagnostic and Classification State Prison.

== Aftermath ==
When the killings first occurred, the incident shocked the entire local community in Santa Claus, given that the town itself had never witnessed such a horrific crime, thus shattering the festive atmosphere of the town weeks before Christmas. The Daniels family was also known to everyone in the town, given that since 1995, the family had regularly taken care of foster children and provided them a home. The community continued to mourn for the victims a year after the shooting.

Throughout the following decades, Jerry Heidler remained as one of the most infamous criminals in Georgia, and the Daniels family murders was also listed as among the most shocking mass murder cases to occur in the history of Georgia.

In 2009, a book, titled the Fear Came to Town: The Santa Claus, Georgia, Murders, was published. The book, which was written by Doug Crandell, covered the case and related legal proceedings.

In 2019, true crime documentary series Homicide for the Holidays re-enacted the 1997 Daniels family murders.

== See also ==
- Capital punishment in Georgia (U.S. state)
- List of death row inmates in the United States § Georgia
