= Jennifer Rudolph Walsh =

American literary agent

Jennifer Rudolph Walsh is the co-owner of Godmothers, an independent bookstore and gathering space in Summerland, California, a “local bookstore with a global dream." Prior to that, she was a board member at the talent agency WME and ran the agency's worldwide literary, speakers, and conference divisions.

== Biography ==
She co-owned and co-led The Writers Shop, a boutique literary agency that William Morris Agency (WMA) acquired in 2000. She moved into WMA with that acquisition and, by the agency’s own account, became the youngest person and first woman to reach its senior leadership in the company’s history.

Walsh's department published over 200 books a year, half of those landing on The New York Times Best Seller list. In 2001, Walsh founded the New York Public Library Young Lions Fiction Award, an annual award that recognizes the work of young authors.

As the sole female member of WME's board after William Morris Agency's merger with Endeavor, Walsh was named to the Hollywood Reporter's Women in Entertainment list for five years running. She was global head of its literary, lectures, and conference divisions, and she represented notable clients such as Brené Brown, Sheryl Sandberg, Alice Munro, and Sue Monk Kidd.

In 2011, she created WME's first Women's Summit, which assembled 120 female execs from the agency's offices around the world. Walsh launched a conference department in 2014, WME Live, which created national conferences for Oprah Winfrey with 'The Life You Want' Tour, Arianna Huffington's 'Thrive', and Cosmopolitan Magazine's 'Fun Fearless Life'.

With author and speaker Glennon Doyle, she co-launched Together Live in 2016, a touring event that brought an array of thought leaders, social activists, athletes, and celebrity guests to cities across the country for a night of inspired talks, interviews, and interactive conversation.

In 2024, Walsh opened Godmothers, an independent bookstore and gathering space in Summerland, California, with co-founder Victoria Jacksona well-known cosmetics entrepreneur. The store serves as a literary and cultural hub, hosting author talks, workshops, and community events. The bookstore hosted its grand opening on Saturday, September 7; the event was attended by Oprah Winfrey, Prince Harry, and Meghan Markle, among others.

Walsh serves on the Board of Trustees of Kenyon College, where she received an undergraduate degree and honorary doctor of letters. She also serves on the board of the National Book Foundation.
