= Elise Loehnen =

Writer and podcast host

Elise Loehnen is an American writer and the host of the podcast Pulling the Thread. Her book, On Our Best Behaviour, was published in 2023.

In On Our Best Behaviour, Loehnen explores how the seven deadly sins have shaped cultural programming and dictated the way women police themselves and other women. She seeks to disentangle the way in which women aspire to "goodness" in a patriarchal system and how the sins shape women's behavior.

Loehnen was the chief content officer of Goop. She hosted the Goop podcast and Goop Lab series on Netflix and oversaw Goop Magazine. She left in 2020 to focus on her book.

Loehnen attended Yale University and was a national championship mathlete finalist. She previously worked for Lucky magazine as deputy editor, and has worked as a ghostwriter in books on self-help, business, and style, including collaborations with Ellen Degeneres and Lea Michele.

Elise lives in Los Angeles with her husband and two sons.
