= Inhale Yoga with Steve Ross =

Television series

Inhale Yoga with Steve Ross, sometimes shortened to just Inhale, was an Oxygen Network television show in the US that was shown at 6am from spring 2000 until spring 2010. The show featured the yoga instructor Steve Ross, named the "guru of Los Angeles" by Vanity Fair.

Critics note the lack of technical guidance and disruptive commercial breaks.
