= Lisa Gersh =

American businesswoman

Lisa Gersh is an American businesswoman and an executive partner at Attention Capital, LLC. She previously was CEO of Martha Stewart Living, Goop, and the Alexander Wang fashion label, and co-founded the Oxygen Network.

== Early life ==
Gersh grew up in The Bronx, New York City. While in school, she worked as an umpire for girls' softball games and at the Foodtown grocery store.

Gersh received her undergraduate degree from SUNY Binghamton, after which she earned her JD from Rutgers University. She is a member of the New York State Bar Association.

== Career ==
In 1986 she began work as a partner at Friedman Kaplan Seiler & Adelman LLP. In 1988, she co-founded Oxygen Media, and was president and COO when she had facilitated its sale to NBCU in 2007. After the sale of Oxygen, she began work for NBCU where she played a key role in their acquisition of The Weather Channel. At NBCU she was President of Strategic Initiatives and as Managing Director of The Weather Channel before joining the NBC News management team in 2009.

Gersh joined Martha Stewart Living Omnimedia as president and COO in 2011. In July 2012 she became CEO of the company. She stepped down in December of the same year during restructuring of the firm, but remained on the board of directors.

In 2014, Gersh was named CEO of Goop, a lifestyle and e-commerce company. In 2017 she succeeded Alexander Wang as CEO of Alexander Wang, Inc.

In October 2019 she became Executive Partner at Attention Capital LLC, an American company acquiring and building media brands in the attention economy.

Gersh is a board member for Hasbro Inc., University of Southern California, Establishment Labs SA, POPSUGAR Inc., The Bail Project, and Pershing Square Tontine Holdings.
