= I Wish Tour =

2013–14 concert tour by Cher Lloyd

- Tour by Cher Lloyd
- Associated album: Sorry I'm Late
- Start date: 23 August 2013
- End date: 17 July 2014
- Legs: 4
- No. of shows: 40

Cher Lloyd concert chronology
- Sticks and Stones Tour (2012); I Wish Tour (2013-14)

The I Wish Tour was the second headlining tour by English singer Cher Lloyd. The tour is in support of her second studio album, Sorry I'm Late, released in May 2014.

The tour kicked off on 23 August 2013 in Recife, Brazil. After a few Brazil dates, the tour continued into North America until 3 November 2013 in Orlando, Florida. Further concerts were held from February to July 2014 in the United States and Europe. It is also her first tour to perform mainly in North America.

Fifth Harmony, Zara Larsson and Jackson Guthy were the opening acts for the tour.

== Background ==
Cher Lloyd spoke about the tour in an interview with Artistdirect. She said:

I really wanted to make it intimate. I want fans to feel like they're almost on stage with me. Connecting with everyone in a room can be a difficult task. I really wanted to open the door a little bit and perform some brand new songs. I'm a little nervous because they obviously haven't been released yet. No one has the actual recordings. Tonight, for the first time, I'm going to be performing them live. I understand they're going to get put on the internet. I'm nervous about it [Laughs]. They're getting a preview of the album, and it's live. I'd better do it well!

== Opening acts ==
- Fifth Harmony
- Zara Larsson
- Jackson Guthy

== Setlist ==
1. "Swagger Jagger"
2. "Playa Boi"
3. "Superhero"
4. "Talkin That"
5. "Bind Your Love"
6. "In for the Kill" (La Roux cover)
7. "Breathing" (Jason Derulo cover)
8. "OMG" (Usher cover)
9. "Goodnight"
10. "Dirty Love"
11. "Sweet Despair"
12. "Oath"
13. "I Wish"
14. "With Ur Love"
15. "Want U Back"

Brazil Setlist:

1. "Swagger Jagger"
2. "Playa Boi"
3. "Superhero"
4. "Beautiful People"
5. "Dub on the Track"
6. "Over the Moon"
7. "End Up Here"
8. "Talkin' That"
9. "Oath"
10. "With Ur Love"
11. "Want U Back"

== Tour dates ==
Date	City	Country	Venue
South America
23 August 2013	Recife	Brazil	Chevrolet Hall
24 August 2013	Rio de Janeiro	Brazil	HSBC Arena
25 August 2013	São Paulo	Brazil	Espaço das Américas
North America
6 September 2013	Washington, D.C.	United States	Fillmore
7 September 2013	New York City	United States	Best Buy Theater
8 September 2013	Philadelphia	United States	Electric Factory
11 September 2013	Montreal	Canada	Corona Theatre
13 September 2013	Toronto	Canada	Phoenix Concert Theatre
14 September 2013	Cleveland	United States	House of Blues
15 September 2013	Chicago	United States	The Vic Theatre
16 September 2013	Minneapolis	United States	First Avenue
18 September 2013	Denver	United States	Ogden Theatre
19 September 2013	Las Vegas	United States	Haze Nightclub
21 September 2013	Las Vegas	United States	The Lot
22 September 2013	San Francisco	United States	Regency
23 September 2013	Los Angeles	United States	Club Nokia
12 October 2013	Topsfield	United States	Topsfield Fair Grounds
3 November 2013	Orlando	United States	House of Blues
22 February 2014	Metairie	United States	Jefferson Parish
18 March 2014	Kansas City	United States	Arvest Bank Theatre at The Midland
21 March 2014	Cincinnati	United States	Bogart's
25 March 2014	Detroit	United States	St. Andrew's Hall
1 April 2014	Munhall	United States	Carnegie Music Hall of Homestead
3 April 2014	Baltimore	United States	Rams Head Live
4 April 2014	Asbury Park	United States	The Stone Pony
5 April 2014	Utica	United States	MVCC
6 April 2014	Huntington	United States	The Paramount
24 May 2014	Orlando	United States	Universal Studios
Europe
14 June 2014	London	England	Isle of Wight Festival
North America
28 June 2014	Baton Rouge	United States	Dixie Landin' Theme Park
Europe
17 July 2014	Manchester	England	Phones 4u Arena

=== Box office score data ===
Venue	City	Tickets sold / available	Gross revenue
Corona Theatre	Montreal	804 / 804 (100%)	$27,158
The Vic Theater	Chicago	861 / 1,002 (86%)	$20,664
Regency Ballroom	San Francisco	1,026 / 1,424 (72%)	$29,850
