= The Goop Lab =

Netflix documentary series

- Genre: Pseudoscience; Documentary series
- Starring: Gwyneth Paltrow; Elise Loehnen
- Country of origin: United States
- Original language: English
- No. of seasons: 1
- No. of episodes: 6

Production
- Executive producers: Gwyneth Paltrow; Elise Loehnen; Andrew Fried; Shauna Minoprio; Dane Lillegard
- Running time: 30 minutes
- Production company: Boardwalk Pictures

Original release
- Network: Netflix
- Release: January 24, 2020

The Goop Lab (also known as The Goop Lab with Gwyneth Paltrow) is an American documentary series about the lifestyle and wellness company Goop, founded by American actress Gwyneth Paltrow, who acts as host and executive producer of the series. The series premiered on January 24, 2020, on Netflix.

The Goop Lab was nominated for two 2020 Critics Choice Real TV Awards. The partnership with Netflix led to criticism of the streaming company for giving Gwyneth Paltrow a platform to promote her company, which has been criticized for making unsubstantiated health claims. The series presented anecdotes and experiences in place of scientifically validated facts. Some headlines called the series a "win for pseudoscience," while others praised the series for a positive look at women's issues and its exploration of alternative medical interventions.

== Premise ==
In The Goop Lab, Gwyneth Paltrow and employees at her wellness and lifestyle company Goop "explore ideas that may seem out-there," namely, psychedelic drugs, Wim Hof's cold therapy, female sexuality, anti-aging diets, "energy" healing, and communication with the dead.

Topics and the series' presentation have been criticized as pseudoscientific. Prior to each episode, there is a disclaimer: "The following series is designed to entertain and inform – not provide medical advice".

== Episodes ==
No.	Title	Original release date
1	"The Healing Trip"	January 24, 2020
Covers psychedelic drugs; features the psychiatrist Will Siu and the researcher Mark Haden.
2	"Cold Comfort"	January 24, 2020
Covers the Wim Hof Method and cold therapy; features the extreme athlete Wim Hof.
3	"The Pleasure Is Ours"	January 24, 2020
Covers female sexuality; features the sex educators Betty Dodson and Carlin Ross
4	"The Health-Span Plan"	January 24, 2020
Covers anti-aging; features the biologists Valter Longo and Morgan Levine
5	"The Energy Experience"	January 24, 2020
Covers energy healing; features the practitioners John Amaral and Apostolos Lekkos
6	"Are You Intuit?"	January 24, 2020
Covers mediumship; features the medium Laura Lynne Jackson and the parapsychologist Julie Beischel

== Production ==
In February 2019, it was announced that Netflix had accepted a six-part series showcasing Goop. On January 6, 2020, Netflix released the first trailer, and announced that the series would be released on January 24, 2020.

The series is executive produced by Paltrow, Elise Loehnen, Andrew Fried, Shauna Minoprio, and Dane Lillegard for Boardwalk Pictures.

In September 2020, it was announced that the series was renewed for a second season of six 30-minute episodes on Netflix.

== Reception ==
=== Critical response ===
Before The Goop Lab was released to reviewers, various media outlets criticized Netflix for producing a series with Goop based on previous criticism of the company. (Note: Attributed to multiple references:) Many sources described the show as promoting pseudoscience. (Note: Attributed to multiple references:) Mia de Graaf wrote in Business Insider Malaysia that the series "can legitimize unscientific, magical thinking about health, as well as pseudoscientific therapies... [and] further erode the foundations and trust in scientific professions." Jonathan Jarry of McGill's Office for Science and Society wrote "The core problem with the series, in my opinion, is its coronation of personal experience... [Such] anecdotes are dirty data: they are contaminated by a dozen variables..." Ars Technica similarly accused the series of making as if "the subjective experiences of a few select individuals are equivalent to the results of randomized, controlled clinical trials..." Some of the criticism regarding pseudoscience focused on Netflix.

Other critics concluded that science and medicine are not the correct standards by which to judge the Netflix series. The series announced in a disclaimer before each episode that "The following series is designed to entertain and inform — not provide medical advice." Monica Hesse wrote in The Washington Post: "Maybe you [Gwyneth Paltrow] owe people more than curiosity. Maybe you owe them vigilance. And maybe this is getting too solemn a viewing exercise that was meant to be a lark. 'The Goop Lab' ultimately doesn’t make a serious dent in conventional wisdom. Most of the crazy-sounding claims eventually wind their way toward something reasonable." Jen Chaney wrote in Vulture: "Goop, the website, has been called out before for pushing pseudoscience, and Netflix seems quite aware of that. Every episode is preceded by a disclaimer that says, 'The following series is designed to entertain and inform — not provide medical advice.' The truth is that none of the episodes seems to be trying to provide medical advice, really. And for the most part, the ideas they explore aren’t super-woo-woo as much as they are a bit experimental. If you’re the kind of person who thinks traditional thinking and standard Western medicine don’t always adequately address every ailment that afflicts humans — and a great many rational individuals feel this way — a lot of what’s in The Goop Lab won’t seem completely out there." Regarding the disclaimer's visibility, another review pointed out that it was shown for just seven seconds in each episode, implying it would be unnoticed or ignored by viewers.

BBC News reported on topics covered by three of the episodes:

- Psychedelics psychotherapy: "The use of psychedelics for therapeutic purposes has increased in recent years, with continuing studies in the US and the UK exploring their short-term and long-term impact on mental health disorders. They have so far been linked to having potentially positive effects related to the treatment of addiction, anxiety related to terminal illness, chronic PTSD, depression, obsessive-compulsive disorder, and social anxiety... While it found little to no evidence of participants experiencing increased life satisfaction, researchers indicated there were lower levels of stress and depression reported." Regarding microdosing, they reported "The use of such powerful psychedelics outside of a controlled environment and without the proper medical expertise is not recommended by medical professionals."
- Cold exposure therapy: "There is some science behind Mr Hof's claims... However, cold-water swimming can be very dangerous - and there is a significant risk of hypothermia when not done in a controlled setting. There is also a risk from the body's acute cold shock response, which may affect the arm muscles while swimming and can lead to incapacitation and potential drowning within minutes if unsupervised."
- Energy healing: "Currently, there is no scientific evidence proving such energy exists." Regarding John Amaral's statements regarding quantum physics' proving his claims, physics professor Philip Moriarty told BBC News that Amaral's attempts to relate the theory to his practice were "pure and utter nonsense."

The final episode on psychic mediumship was called "socially irresponsible" by Bob Nygaard, a private detective specializing in psychic fraud investigations, in an article in Skeptical Inquirer. When asked about Paltrow's motivations for airing the episode, Nygaard said "I wouldn’t presume to know whether or not Gwyneth Paltrow understands the gravity of promoting self-proclaimed psychics… but I, like you, fear that [this] will increase the likelihood of more vulnerable people being defrauded." New Scientist wrote "Paltrow interviews a scientist who says she has carried out rigorous studies that prove mediums are real. But other work has shown that scientists are too easily fooled and that the best people at catching out mediums are professional magicians and illusionists. The researcher rolls out another cliche – 'science is just one way of knowing' – which leaves me sceptical that she is appropriately sceptical."

Arielle Pardes wrote in Wired that "the show has its fair share of 'junk science, gibberish, and unproven health claims from snake-oil-salesmen guests,' as some reviews have pointed out. But there are reputable experts who share real science, too. The first episode, about the benefits of psychedelics, features an interview with Mark Haden, the executive director of MAPS Canada. MAPS, or the Multidisciplinary Association for Psychedelic Studies, works closely with the FDA and promotes academic research and clinical studies around the therapeutic potential of psychedelics. Another episode, on female orgasm, features Betty Dodson, the 90-year-old sex educator whose work has been instrumental in understanding pleasure." According to a spokesperson for Goop, the episode featuring Dodson was the most popular of the first season. The episode was shown in a Manhattan movie theater in December 2019 and received a standing ovation.

Wired UK, Victoria Turk was positive about the focus on the possible therapeutic applications of these drugs: "in the past two decades, research studies and clinical trials have been conducted that involve LSD, psilocybin and other substances that we usually think of in a recreational context, often with the aim of exploring treatments for mental health disorders such as depression, addiction and PTSD," but bored by the lack of rigorous scientific discussion: "This is where the episode really starts getting boring. ... [T]he exploration of the potential therapeutic benefits of psychedelics becomes so vague that we don’t really learn anything at all. It’s not that there’s much wrong exactly; it’s more that there’s very little substance to begin with. The Goop members laugh, cry and cry some more. There’s lots of talking about feelings that’s all a bit too much for my British sensibility, and some very awkward-to-watch hugging."

The episode on women's sexual pleasure, in another Wired UK review, Sophie Charara wrote that "Despite its star’s shaky grip on anatomy, this episode manages to cover some of the most damaging sexual myths and taboos that still persist today." Similarly, writing for ABC, Olivia Willis said that since "Goop's record on women's health is not strong... You can imagine my surprise (and utter delight) to find 35 minutes of vulva anatomy, body positivity and frank discussions about women's sexual health and autonomy. The success of this episode is, in large part, thanks to Betty Dodson, a 90-year-old feminist sex educator and her colleague, Carlin Ross, who run workshops that aim to empower women with knowledge about their bodies. Dodson notes that many women feel shame or embarrassment when it comes to sex, and most of the episode is spent trying to counter this."

Critics were also divided on the series' entertainment value. The review aggregator website Rotten Tomatoes shows an approval rating of 29% based on 31 reviews; its "critic's consensus" reads: "Though it benefits from Paltrow's charms, The Goop Lab's pseudoscience holds little water and its stiff format is often more boring than enlightening." Ars Technica, a Condé Nast publication, concluded that "the show is just, well, boring." Writing in Vox under the headline "Netflix’s The Goop Lab pushes flimsy wellness trends. But it’s strong on vulvas," Julia Belluz who had previously published a reaction to the series trailer said that "When we watched the actual show, we found it was generally less edgy than the trailer suggested — some episodes were downright boring (like the 'health-span plan' about dieting for longevity), while others contained useful health messages (such as caring for and loving your body)"

Jen Chaney in Vulture wrote that "I was fully prepared to hate The Goop Lab... I regret to inform everyone on the internet, where it’s become a competitive sport to vocally loathe Paltrow and her website that sells vagina-scented candles for $75, that The Goop Lab isn’t particularly hateable. Some of the episodes are even helpful... the half-hour installments, which each focus on a specific wellness topic and recruit Goop employees to try out various treatments and therapies, are actually interesting and informative. My chief complaint about The Goop Lab, believe it or not, is that its episodes need to be a little longer. I just wrote that sentence and meant it. I know: It’s unbelievable to me, too!"

Variety wrote that "Paltrow is a compelling host — not giving too much of herself away, ever stopping short of pure endorsement of any topic even as she gives it air — on what is a carefully structured, elegantly built, compulsively watchable show about, mainly, complete nonsense." Entertainment Weekly said the series was "either unexpectedly moving or morally disgusting." Reviewing the show for the Washington Post, Monica Hesse was generally critical of Goop but begrudgingly praised Paltrow: "Maybe one day I’ll understand how I can actually love Gwyneth Paltrow, and yet find that, when I open my mouth, only snark comes out. Is it that I find her earnestness both poignant and poisonous? Do I fear my own inner truth? I’d wager that anyone making time for “The Goop Lab” is coming to it from a similar place: A love-hate desire to know what she's actually like when she doles out the advice that usually appears, disembodied, on her website. And the answer is: Thoughtful. Open. Searching. Curiosity is hard to fake, and Gwyneth has it, whether she's asking a doctor to explain his psychedelic research or querying one of her assistants/guinea pigs about the effects of an experiment." Daley Quinn similarly appraised Paltrow: "Despite the fact that many of these episodes made me thoroughly uncomfortable, I couldn't help but become absolutely entranced by Paltrow, with her orphic aqua eyes, pastel outfits and aggressively California-cool-girl vibe. As I binged my way though [sic] the episodes, I found her to be unfailingly funny and entertaining, and I came to understand why so many flock to her site daily in the hopes of Goop-ifying their lives."

In The New York Times, Elisa Albert and Jennifer Block gave a feminist critique of the criticism targeting The Goop Lab and Goop: "what underlies all the overwhelming, predictable, repetitive critiques? What exactly is so awful about a bunch of consenting adults seeking self-knowledge, vitality and emotional freedom? ... The tsunami of Goop hatred is best understood within a context that is much older and runs much deeper than Twitter, streaming platforms, consumerism or capitalism. Throughout history, women in particular have been mocked, reviled, and murdered for maintaining knowledge and practices that frightened, confused and confounded 'the authorities.' (Namely the church, and later, medicine.) Criticism of Goop is founded, at least in part, upon deeply ingrained reserves of fear, loathing, and ignorance about things we cannot see, touch, authenticate, prove, own or quantify. It is emblematic of a cultural insistence that we quash intuitive measures and 'other' ways of knowing — the sort handed down via oral tradition, which, for most women throughout history, was the only way of knowing. In other words, it’s classic patriarchal devaluation."

Pardes focused her Wired review on the idea of hope: "What the show does most candidly, though, is shine a light on the desperation people feel when science cannot understand their pain. Throughout the series, we meet a Goop staffer suffering from a panic disorder, another who’s dealing with the trauma of her father’s suicide, and another who has trouble with intimacy since coming out as gay. Between the interviews and the staff stunts, there are various 'case studies,' like a veteran who tried to kill himself multiple times before finding MDMA-assisted therapy. If The Goop Lab is an infomercial for the products it sells, it’s also a portrait of the average Goop aficionado. They’ve been failed by everything else; if a $300 crystal can make them feel better, why not try? If anyone stands to gain from The Goop Lab, though, it’s not the viewers, or the staffers who jump at the chance to go on a 'shroom trip. It’s the people whose products and alternative therapies are showcased on screen, each of whom can expect a sizable dose of interest after the exposure from Paltrow’s show. After watching so many of Goop’s staffers open up about their personal challenges and traumas, it’s hard not to root for them to find a little peace. If energy healing does the trick, well, so be it."

=== Accolades ===
In 2020, the series was nominated for two Critics' Choice Real TV Awards, which "recognize excellence in nonfiction, unscripted and reality programming across broadcast, cable, and streaming platforms." The series was nominated for "Best Lifestyle Show: Fashion/Beauty", and Gwyneth Paltrow was nominated for "Best Female Star of the Year."

In 2021, the series was nominated by the National Arts & Entertainment Journalism Awards as a "Best Critical TV Show."

== See also ==
- (Un)well (TV series)
