= I Wish (Cher Lloyd song) =

Single by Cher Lloyd featuring T.I.

from the album Sorry I'm Late
- Released: 2 September 2013
- Recorded: 2012
- Studio: Beat Studio (Miami, Florida, United States)
- Genre: Pop
- Length: 3:32
- Label: Syco; Epic; Sony
- Songwriters: Shellback; Savan Kotecha; Ilya; Oscar Görres; Clifford Harris
- Producers: Shellback; Ilya; Görres

Cher Lloyd singles chronology
"Rum and Raybans" (2012)	"I Wish" (2013)	"Sirens" (2014)

T.I. singles chronology
"Wit' Me" (2013)	"I Wish" (2013)	"Change Your Life" (2013)

Music video
- "I Wish" on YouTube

"I Wish" is a song by English singer Cher Lloyd. It was released on 2 September 2013 as the lead single from her second studio album, Sorry I'm Late (2014). The song, produced by Shellback, Ilya and OZGO, features a guest appearance from American rapper T.I. The song was leaked online on 28 August 2013. Lloyd performed the song on her I Wish Tour (2013–14).

Lloyd appeared on Late Night with Jimmy Fallon in November 2013, featuring Skee-Lo performing portions of his own rap song called "I Wish".

== Critical reception ==
The song earned positive reviews. Rick Florino of ArtistDirect described the song as a "kind of sputtering spunky pop that bona fide hits are made of. As the beat bounces and horns pipe up, the singer bobs and weaves through a myriad of attributes she "wishes" she had—namely "a butt and a rack". He also stated: "Add to that a flavorful verse from T.I., and you've got one of the catchiest and (sassiest) gems this year. Her next album might just be her Mona Lisa to date". Digital Spy awarded the song 3/5 stars, and called the single "undeniably fun".

In an article by Billboard posted in December 2019, "I Wish" was listed as one of the "Best Overlooked Pop Songs of the 2010s", picked by the staff at Billboard. "British pop star Cher Lloyd crossed the pond with your kicky solo single "Want U Back," but "I Wish," an utterly charming team-up with T.I. that preceded her second album Sorry I'm Late, brought the concept of the Skee-Lo song of the same name into a new generation." The list was published in no particular order and compiled 40 songs released in the 2010s.

== Music video ==
The official music video for "I Wish" was uploaded on 24 September 2013. Directed by Gil Green, the video features both T.I. and Lloyd in a bar. In the video, T.I. enters the bar with an entourage of girls, and Lloyd, as a waitress, notices T.I. but believes that she can't compete with the other girls, but tries to get his attention. However, T.I. eventually leaves the girls he arrived with to talk to Lloyd, and the video ends with them leaving together.

== Track listing ==
Digital download
No.	Title	Length
1.	"I Wish" (featuring T.I.)	3:32

Promo CD single
No.	Title	Length
1.	"I Wish" (featuring T.I.)	3:32
2.	"I Wish" (Instrumental)	3:29
3.	"I Wish" (Without T.I.)	3:32
4.	"I Wish" (Super Clean Edit)	3:32

== Personnel ==
- Cher Lloyd – vocals
- T.I. – vocals
- Shellback, Ilya and OZGO – production

== Charts ==
Chart (2013–2014)	Peak position
Australia (ARIA)	40
Belgium (Ultratip Bubbling Under Flanders)	34
Czech Republic Singles Digital (ČNS IFPI)	73
France (SNEP)	200
New Zealand (Recorded Music NZ)	16
Russia Airplay (Tophit)	191
Slovakia Singles Digital (ČNS IFPI)	73
South Korea Foreign Download (Gaon)	89
US Bubbling Under Hot 100 (Billboard)	16

== Certifications ==
Region	Certification	Certified units/sales
New Zealand (RMNZ)	Gold	7,500^{*}
^{*} Sales figures based on certification alone.

== Release history ==
Region	Date	Format	Label	Ref.
Various (excluding Great Britain)	2 September 2013	Digital download	Syco; Epic; Sony	
United States	17 September 2013	Top 40 radio	Epic	
