= Goop (company) =

Lifestyle brand founded by Gwyneth Paltrow

Goop, Inc.
- Trade name: goop
- Type: Private
- Industry: Publishing; Internet retail
- Founded: 2008; 18 years ago
- Founder: Gwyneth Paltrow
- Headquarters: Santa Monica, California, U.S.
- Key people: Gwyneth Paltrow (CEO)
- Number of employees: 80 (2017)
- Website: goop.com

Goop is a wellness and lifestyle brand and company founded by American actress Gwyneth Paltrow. It was launched in September 2008 as a weekly e-mail newsletter providing New Age advice, such as "police your thoughts" and "eliminate white foods", and the slogan "Nourish the Inner Aspect". Goop later expanded into e-commerce, collaborating with fashion brands, hosting pop-up shops, holding a "wellness summit", and launching a print magazine, podcast, and docuseries on Netflix.

Goop has faced criticism for marketing products and treatments that are harmful, described as "snake oil", based on pseudoscience, and lack efficacy. California officials from the Consumer Protection Office have sued Goop for false advertising, asserting that Goop has made unfounded health claims about a variety of products. Goop settled the lawsuit out of court. Class-action lawsuits have been brought against Goop for unsafe products.

== History ==
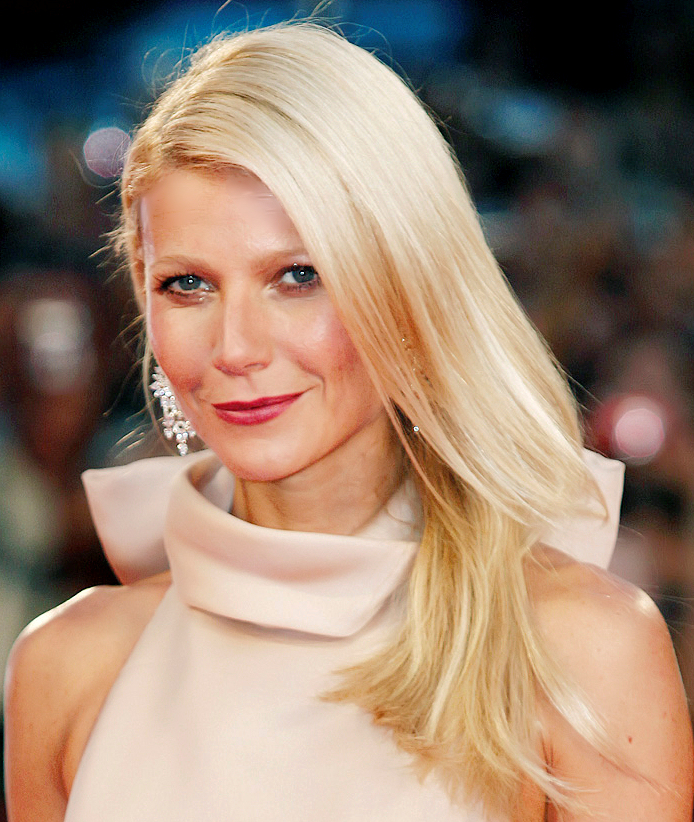
Founder Gwyneth Paltrow

Goop was founded in Paltrow's home in London, beginning as a newsletter in 2008, with an editor's note in each email from Paltrow offering insight into her daily life. Goop was incorporated in 2011. According to Paltrow, the company's name came from Peter Arnell telling her that successful internet companies have double Os in their name, and she "wanted it to be a word that means nothing and could mean anything". Adding the double "O" between her initials thus resulted in the company name. Goop, of course, does have a meaning in English.

Seb Bishop was CEO of Goop from 2011 to 2014. Several other celebrities were inspired by Goop to launch their own similar lifestyle websites. In 2014, Goop hired Oxygen Media founder and former CEO of Martha Stewart Living Omnimedia, Lisa Gersh, as CEO. From 2014 onwards, Goop's wellness content became increasingly radical, to the point where doctors would begin to call it pseudoscience and media outlets would describe Goop's content as "no longer ludicrous— no, now it was dangerous".

In 2015, Paltrow stated that she wanted Goop to "be its own stand-alone brand". At that time around two dozen people worked for Goop. In 2016 the company's roster had increased to 60 employees. That year, Goop's most searched topic was the term "detox". Later in 2016, Paltrow moved the company's operations to the US from the UK following her separation from Chris Martin and Gersh left the position of CEO. The position remained vacant until early 2017, when the board named Paltrow, who had previously announced in 2016 that she would be stepping away from Goop, to fill the post.

In 2016, Goop moved its headquarters to Santa Monica, California, from New York. The Santa Monica location was previously a chicken coop. The interior warehouse space was designed by Restoration Hardware. By 2017, Goop had 90 employees, and was attracting criticism, including a lawsuit filed by Truth In Advertising. In an April 2017 Jezebel article, Stassa Edwards criticized Goop's marketing and retail strategy, claiming that the company profits "from endless illness". Jill Avery, a brand analyst, has noted how Goop's response to this criticism seems designed to "strengthen their brand and draw their customers closer", noting Goop's use of feminism, traditional Asian medicines and Eastern philosophies, and anti-establishment politics to do so. Paltrow characterizes criticisms as "cultural firestorms" which cause an influx of website traffic, stating that she can "monetize those eyeballs".

In 2018, Goop began assembling an internal science and regulatory team. Goop, in partnership with Google, also began selling Google Home smart speakers and accessories in the Goop Lab stores and holiday pop-up shops, and opened its first permanent East Coast Goop store called Goop Lab at 25 Bond Street (Manhattan). This followed the establishment of a permanent location at the Brentwood Country Mart in Brentwood, California in September 2017. As of March 2018, Goop had 150 employees.

In January 2020, Goop began selling a $75 candle called "This Smells Like My Vagina", based upon a joke with perfumer Douglas Little. Paltrow and Little were testing out various new fragrances, when she found one she loved and said, “Uhh, this smells like a vagina”. The candle quickly sold out and can be found selling on eBay for as much as $250. In late July 2020 Goop moved to their new corporate headquarters in a larger location, also in Santa Monica, whose interior was designed by the multidisciplinary firm Rapt Studio. The company signed a 10-year lease for 57,000 square feet in the newly built Santa Monica Gateway commercial development. By early 2020 it was reported that the company was valued at about $250 million. In early October 2020 Elise Loehnen announced she was stepping down as chief content officer to take a sabbatical to write a book. She will continue as Goop’s editor at large.

In October 2021, it was reported that over 140 Goop employees had left the company since 2019.

== Funding and revenue ==
In 2011, Goop generated £81,000 in sales, and the year after it generated £1.1 million in sales, with a loss of £23,000. As of 2013, Goop had net liabilities of £540,086. Goop doubled its revenues from 2014 to 2015, and again from 2015 to 2016. In 2018 the company tripled its year-over-year revenue from 2017.

In 2016, Goop received $15 million USD in Series B funding from venture capital firms NEA, Felix Capital and 14W Venture Partners. This corresponded with Goop centralizing their operations in the Los Angeles area, where Paltrow is based, and away from New York, where Gersh lives.

In 2018, Goop raised $50 million in Series C funding from firms including NEA, Lightspeed and Felix Capital, bringing total investment in the company to $82 million. The company's valuation rose to $250 million.

Among Goop's financial backers is Greycroft Partners, a venture capital firm which has also backed other businesses including Klout, Huffington Post, Venmo and Ireland-based cosmetic treatment/beauty clinic chain Sisu.

== Products and distribution ==
Goop launched an online shop in 2012, and it earned $1.5 million for Goop during its first year of operation. By 2014, the Goop newsletter had an estimated 700,000 subscribers.

In 2015, Goop launched a publishing imprint, Goop Press, with Grand Central Publishing, and planned to release one title per year.

In 2016, additional funds also led to an increase in staffing for Goop, as well as the launch of new products, including a fashion label with a focus on practical, tailored clothing.

In 2017, Goop entered the vitamin and supplements market. Paltrow first had the idea to market supplements after receiving a Myers' cocktail from Alejandro Junger in 2007. The supplement products sold over $100,000 worth of product on the launch day. In April, Goop announced that they had entered into an agreement with Condé Nast to launch a new print magazine under the name Goop. The quarterly magazine was launched in September, but only ran for two issues, with Nast replacing pieces that failed their fact-checking process by travel articles, and a disagreement over the use of the magazine to promote Goop products. In December 2017, Goop announced the launch of a digital shop in Canada, following its first physical store in the country in partnership with Nordstrom.

Goop generates revenue from advertising and also sells a Goop-branded clothing line, a perfume, and books. As of 2017 Goop newsletter readers have an average age of 34 and household income of $100k+ per year.

Goop launched a podcast on March 8, 2018, using Cadence13 as its digital platform. Its first guest was Oprah Winfrey. The podcast reached number one in the Apple Podcast charts the same day it aired- on March 8. It is largely hosted by Goop CCO Elise Loehnen and has a weekly audience of 100,000 to 650,000. The company also partnered with Westin Hotels & Resorts to offer a range of fitness programs called "G. Sport Sessions" later that summer. Goop began streaming their podcast on 600 Delta planes in February 2019. In September 2019, they partnered with Banana Republic for an eight-part podcast series entitled Women on Top. In February 2020 Goop launched a spring clothing line called "Goop Edit" for Banana Republic on the Goop website. The partnership also released its second eight-part series of Women on Top.

Goop expanded its fashion offerings in 2018, hiring Danielle Pergament of Allure to be Goop's editor in chief, directly under CCO Elise Loehnen. Ali Pew of InStyle was hired as Goop's fashion director and Anne Keane, formerly of Lucky magazine, was hired as Goop's fashion strategy director. In 2018 they attended New York Fashion Week as representatives of the company. In June 2018, Goop launched a capsule collection (a smaller version of a designer's larger collection that includes only the most essential or influential pieces from that collection) with fashion designer Lilly Pulitzer. In December 2018, Goop partnered with Universal Standard to add a collection of plus-size clothing to its clothing line. The plus-size collection features US sizes 00-40, (UK sizes 2–44).

In June 2018, Goop opened its first international pop-up shop in London. In January 2019, the shop became a permanent Goop store. The company also hired its first chief marketing officer, Andres Sosa, to work on further expansion in the UK. In August 2018, Goop launched a furniture and home decor line with Crate & Barrel's CB2 brand.

In January 2020 the company’s private label brand, Goop Beauty, began a partnership with Sephora. Distribution began in Sephora stores in January in the US, and then in February, the GoopGlow collection of cosmetics became available in Canada.

In September 2020 Goop joined with French clothing company A.P.C. to launch a clothing collection promoting the two companies' focus on conscious consumption.

In November 2020 the Goop lifestyle brand joined with Los Angeles-based bed manufacturer Avocado, to introduce a “climate-neutral” and “ethically sourced” bed.

Goop's first "Fair Trade Specialty Coffee" was released at the end of 2020. The beans are grown in Colombia by Astrid Medina, who runs a "sustainable and ethical" farm.

Beginning in November 2020 JetBlue Mint business class overhauled customer amenities to include several products from Goop’s cosmetic line.

Thirteen Lune announced in April 2021 its decision to make Goop its first "ally brand", listing some Goop products on its e-commerce website.

As of April 1, 2021, Jenna Lyons listed her DTC eyelash brand LoveSeen on Goop.com. It is LoveSeen's first retail partnership and Goop.com's first time offering fake eyelashes for sale.

In November 2022, Goop signed a deal with Audible for a set of original audio projects.

=== Brands and product lines ===
Since Goop's inception in 2008, it has launched several brands and product lines. The "Beauty" section of the website works in tandem with the products sold in the shop. Goop brands and product lines are sold online, at several in-person "Goop stores" including the Goop Lab in Brentwood Country Mart in Los Angeles, and at pop-up shops in Los Angeles, New York, Chicago, the Hamptons, Dallas and Aspen, and in collaboration with Nordstrom stores. Goop-branded products quadrupled in value in 2017. These brands include:

- Goop by Juice Beauty, a makeup and skincare line launched in partnership with Juice Beauty in 2016, influenced by the popularity of a Goop article the year before about beauty products without formaldehyde and endocrine disruptors. The brand's products are made from USDA certified organic ingredients and are considered to be vegan.
- Goop Label, a fashion line launched in September 2016. The collection is based on Paltrow's personal favorites and styles, and has been described as "high-street staples".
- Goop Fragrance, an all-natural fragrance line including perfume and scented candles. The first fragrance, Edition 01 Winter, was created by the perfumer Douglas Little and released in November 2016.
- Goop Wellness, which sells GMO and gluten-free vitamins and other supplements. The line was launched in 2017, and was influenced by the popularity of a Goop article that year about "postnatal depletion".
- G. Sport Sessions, a range of fitness programs offered in partnership with Westin Hotels and Resorts launched in 2018, with classes led by Tracy Anderson, Paltrow's personal trainer.
- CB2 x goop, a furniture and home décor line in collaboration with Crate & Barrel, launched in August 2018.
- GoopGenes All-In-One Nourishing Face Cream and Eye Cream was launched in early August 2020 with the help of Paltrow's mother, actress Blythe Danner, and daughter, Apple Martin.
- In March 2020 Goop launched a limited-edition activewear line in partnership with American designer Proenza Schouler. It was the first activewear collection from PS, and the first time that Goop had a partner in the design of the G. Sport collection.

== Brick and mortar stores ==
Goop opened its first permanent brick and mortar store in Los Angeles in September 2017. On June 20, 2019, Goop opened a store inside the luxury retailer Harvey Nichols’ flagship store in London. In November 2020 Goop opened a 1,012 square-foot shop at the Mauna Lani, Auberge Resorts Hotel on the Island of Hawaii. The shop was designed in collaboration with interior designers Kate McCollugh and Max Zinser. In February 2020 Goop opened a permanent retail store, Goop’s Sundries Shop, at the Rosewood Miramar Beach hotel in Montecito, California. There is also a Goop Lab store in Brentwood, California and a Goop MRKT in Sag Harbor, New York. Goop opened a pop-up shop in September 2018 in the Notting Hill area of London. Originally planned to close in January 2019, it remained open until November 2020. On March 8, 2021, Goop opened a "ghost kitchen", a restaurant set up for delivery-only, in Los Angeles. Chef Kim Floresca, who worked at restaurants Per Se, Bulli, and The Restaurant at Meadowood, is the chief chef. The menu offers gluten-free and vegan choices.

== The Goop Lab ==
The Goop Lab is a documentary series promoting the Goop company, which premiered on January 24, 2020, on Netflix. It prominently features Gwyneth Paltrow and Elise Loehnen interviewing experts in different fields. In 2020 The Goop Lab was nominated for two Critics Choice Real TV Awards. The series was nominated for Best Lifestyle Show:Fashion/Beauty; and Gwyneth Paltrow was nominated for the Best Female Star of the Year. However, critics called the series a "win for pseudoscience". In a Skeptical Inquirer interview, Bob Nygaard said, “I wouldn’t presume to know whether or not Gwyneth Paltrow understands the gravity of promoting self-proclaimed psychics … but I, like you, fear that Paltrow’s The Goop Lab episode ‘Are You Intuit?’ will increase the likelihood of more vulnerable people being defrauded.”

== Wellness summits ==
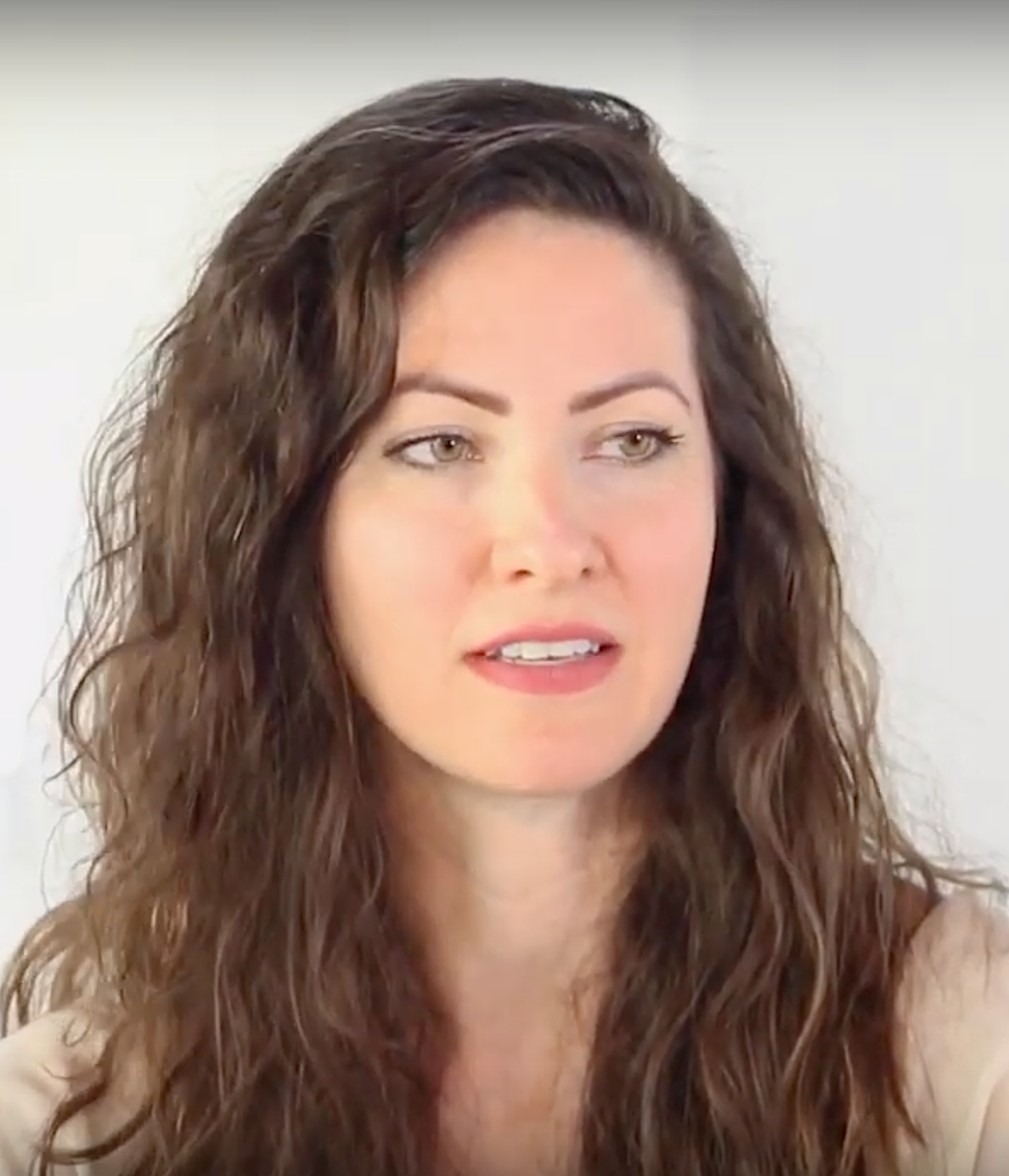
Panelists at wellness summits have included vaccine skeptic Kelly Brogan

Goop held its first wellness summit in June 2017. The event had over 600 attendees. The company's second In Goop Health summit was held in New York City in January 2018. Panelists included Kelly Brogan, who has disputed the effectiveness of both vaccinations and HIV medications. The invitation of Brogan has been criticized by Jezebel. The third summit was held in Culver City, California in June 2018. Guests included Meg Ryan and Janet Mock. Paltrow is considering ways to take the wellness summit "on the road", so that it can access a wider audience. In October 2018, Goop held its fourth summit at the Stanley Park pavilion in Vancouver. In March 2019, Goop held its fifth summit at Pier 17 in New York City. In May 2019, Goop held an In goop Health summit at the Rolling Greens Nursery in Los Angeles. Democratic presidential candidate Marianne Williamson attended Goop's eighth wellness summit in Richmond, California.

Due to the COVID-19 pandemic in 2020, Goop canceled a planned inaugural "Goop at Sea" cruise that had been scheduled to begin in late August. Registrants received 100 percent reimbursement or 125 percent credit for a future cruise. In late April 2021, Paltrow announced that she expected to launch her Celebrity Cruises partnership in 2022.

Beginning in April 2020, in response to the COVID-19 lockdown, Goop began to host, virtual "In Goop Health" summits in partnership with YouTube with no cost to participants. The digital summits were simplified versions of the live events Goop had held in the past in cities such as Los Angeles, London, and New York.

The ninth In Goop Health wellness summit "The At-Home Summit" was live-streamed on September 12, 2020.

== Convention and summit participation ==
In late October 2020 Goop participated in the Philippine Digital Convention 2020. Paltrow, representing Goop, spoke at the plenary session held on the first day.

== Criticism ==
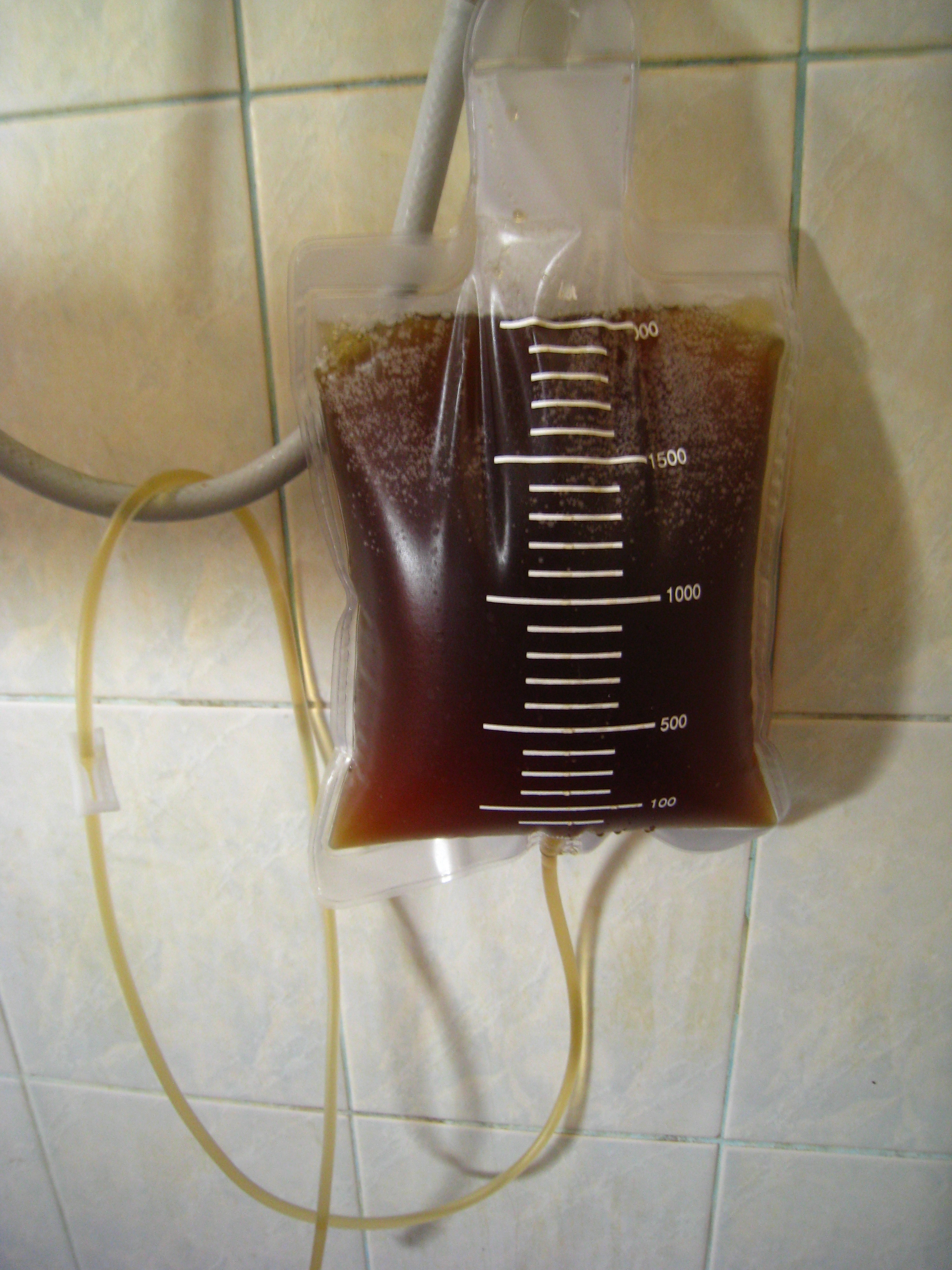
Goop has promoted potentially harmful coffee enemas (prepared enema bag pictured) as having health benefits

Goop has been criticized for showcasing expensive products and making "out of touch" recommendations that many readers cannot afford, which Paltrow has responded to by stating that such products and recommendations are "aspirational," furthermore arguing that the items available cannot be made for a lower price, and that the content of Goop is free. Dana Logan argues that Goop is an example of asceticism as part of consumer culture. Goop has also drawn criticism for selling cosmetics containing the same ostensibly harmful chemicals which the site tells people to avoid.

In April 2015, Paltrow and the Goop staff participated in a food stamp challenge in an attempt to raise awareness for the Food Bank for New York City. Paltrow gave up on the challenge after four days, writing that she had expected she would not be able to abide by the budget for the full week. Critics suggested that Paltrow's groceries did not accurately reflect what SNAP recipients usually buy, though Aubrey Gordon notes that the point of the challenge was to show that SNAP benefits are not sufficient, even for privileged people such as celebrities.

A number of products sold by Goop, as well as ideas promoted in its blog posts, have been criticized as "snake oil" for having no scientific basis, not producing the desired results, having no medical benefit, or potentially even being harmful. In January 2015, Paltrow advocated for a spa treatment referred to as vaginal steaming, described as "snake oil," a process she reportedly underwent at the Tikkun Spa in the Los Angeles area, wherein "you sit on what is essentially a mini-throne, and a combination of infrared and mugwort steam cleanses your uterus, et al [sic]." Paltrow admitted that she thought that the process was "insane" but did not disavow it, instead suggesting that it has "real healing properties." Gynecologists were critical, with Draion Burch, an obstetrics and gynaecology specialist, indicating that "there's no scientific evidence that shows it works." An article published on July 18, 2017, in TheStar.com documented the ongoing battle over this issue between Paltrow and Jennifer Gunter, an OB/GYN for Kaiser Permanente in San Francisco, whom the Toronto Star dubbed an expert in "vaginal health."

Also in 2015, Timothy Caulfield wrote a book on the negative impact of celebrity endorsement called Is Gwyneth Paltrow Wrong About Everything? in which he described the lack of evidence for several products sold by Goop and endorsed by Paltrow, as well as health claims made by other celebrities. In October 2015, in a blog post in Goop, Habib Sadeghi revisited the disproven claim that breast cancer might be linked to wearing underwire bras. The claim was swiftly criticized, with Gunter stating "it’s breast size that increases the risk of breast cancer and not because larger breasts need more manhandling by underwires, but because larger breasts are harder to screen and are associated with obesity, a known risk for breast cancer."

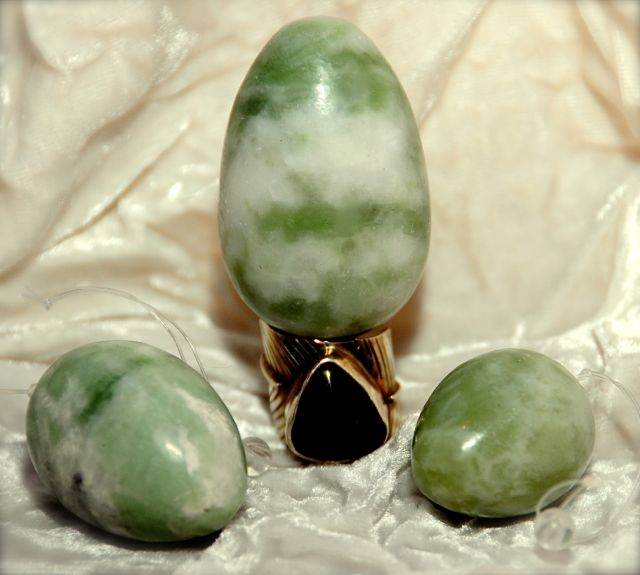
Jade vaginal eggs, which were marketed by Goop for weightlifting purposes

In January 2017, Goop marketed the "Jade Egg" for US$66 as a form of vaginal weightlifting which, according to their website, is "used by women to increase sexual energy, health, and pleasure." Gynecologists were critical of this product, with Gunter calling it a "load of garbage." In 2018, this post was tagged as an "Ancient Modality." In September 2018 the Goop company agreed to pay $145,000 to settle a lawsuit alleging that Goop has posted claims about the eggs and about an herbal remedy, both without scientific basis.

In June 2017, Goop marketed "Body Vibes," wearable stickers that were claimed to "re-balance the energy frequency in our bodies." Originally, the advertisement claimed that the stickers were "made with the same conductive carbon material NASA uses to line space suits so they can monitor an astronaut’s vitals during wear," but NASA denied that they had "any conductive carbon material lining" in their spacesuits, with Mark Shelhamer, former chief scientist at NASA's human research division, going so far as to call the claim a "load of BS." The reference to NASA was subsequently removed from the advertisement, with the manufacturer of the stickers issuing a statement to Gizmodo saying "We apologize to NASA, Goop, our customers and our fans for this communication error. We never intended to mislead anyone. We have learned that our engineer was misinformed by a distributor about the material in question, which was purchased for its unique specifications."

In October 2017, The Skeptic awarded Goop the Rusty Razor award "for the most audacious pseudo-science." The award was decided by readers’ votes, and Goop was the winner "by a landslide." Also in 2017, Goop promoted a coffee enema device from Implant O'Rama LLC, despite a lack of scientific evidence to their efficacy and in spite of evidence of coffee enemas' potentially fatal side effects.

In January 2018, Goop was criticized for posting articles by "medical medium" Anthony William who claims to use paranormal abilities to give advice. Goop has said of William, that he:

[...] is one of the most unconventional and surprisingly insightful healers today: As he explains, the voice of a divine force called Spirit guides him to identify the roots of his patients’ hard-to-diagnose illnesses and find the best solutions to restore their health. [...] Now, William is sharing four of his wonder foods— apples, celery, ginger, and honey— with us. Below, he breaks down what makes them so powerful [...] which ailments (from anxiety to Lyme disease, adrenal fatigue, and brain fog) to target with each food [...]

In October 2018, the Good Thinking Society reported the company to the National Trading Standards and the Advertising Standards Authority, claiming that Goop had breached over 113 advertising laws of the UK. Laura Thomason, project manager at the Good Thinking Society told The Independent:

It is shocking to see the sheer volume of unproven claims made by Gwyneth Paltrow’s Goop about their products, especially given that some of their health advice is potentially dangerous. [...] Gwyneth Paltrow may well have good intentions, but she and her company sell products with claims that could clearly mislead customers. [...] if Gwyneth Paltrow cannot provide satisfactory evidence behind the claims she makes for her products, she should not be making those claims.

On January 20, 2020, speaking at the Sheldonian Theatre in Oxford, the head of the UK's National Health Service, Simon Stevens spoke about misinformation which harms patients, exemplified by Goop's claim that "chemical sunscreen is a bad idea," and Goop's promotion of colonic irrigation, which Stevens said are "carrying considerable risk to health."

=== Legal settlements ===
Goop has faced criticism for marketing products and treatments that are based on pseudoscience, lack efficacy, and are recognized by the medical community as harmful. In 2017, Truth in Advertising filed a complaint with California regulators regarding over 50 health claims made by Goop, which resulted in a $125,000 settlement and a five-year injunction prohibiting the company from making unsubstantiated claims about the characteristics or health benefits of its products.

In 2016, Goop said it would voluntarily, permanently discontinue claims for Moon Juice "Brain Dust" and "Action Dust" following an inquiry from the National Advertising Division of the Council of Better Business Bureaus.

In August 2017, the consumer advocacy group Truth in Advertising filed a complaint with district attorneys in the state of California regarding "deceptive" health claims made by Goop regarding 51 products, including Jade vaginal eggs among others. The company settled the suit in September 2018, agreeing to pay $145,000, issue refunds, and be subject to a five-year injunction under which it may not suggest that its products have "sponsorship, approval, characteristics, ingredients, uses, or benefits which they do not have." At the time of the settlement, Goop had sold around 3,000 vaginal eggs.

=== Disclaimers ===
Despite routinely posting articles which purport to give health and nutrition advice on a wide range of topics, authors typically end with this disclaimer:

The views expressed in this article intend to highlight alternative studies and induce conversation. They are the views of the author and do not necessarily represent the views of Goop, and are for informational purposes only, even if and to the extent that this article features the advice of physicians and medical practitioners. This article is not, nor is it intended to be, a substitute for professional medical advice, diagnosis, or treatment, and should never be relied upon for specific medical advice.

In early 2018, Goop started labeling articles with disclaimers indicating whether their content is "For Your Enjoyment" or "Supported by Science."

In response, on June 29, 2018, the watchdog group Truth in Advertising sent a letter to the California Food, Drug and Medical Device Task Force, saying that:

[The disclaimers] make clear that the company is aware that it does not have the appropriate scientific evidence to support many of the health claims that it is making in its marketing materials. Further, as a matter of law, these four disclosures cannot be used as cover for unsubstantiated disease-treatment claims. That is to say, Goop is not permitted to make a deceptive health claim and then post a disclaimer saying, 'sorry, there isn’t reliable and competent scientific evidence to actually support that claim but buy our product to treat your [fill in the ailment] anyway.'

Labels and website descriptions of dietary supplement products are required to include the standard wording for the US Food and Drug Administration disclaimer:

"These statements have not been evaluated by the Food and Drug Administration (FDA). This product is not intended to diagnose, treat, cure, or prevent any disease."

Printing this disclaimer on labels and website does not permit health claims beyond the very basic Structure:Function vocabulary regardless of how strong any clinical trial evidence is.

In 2021, Goop was sued over a claim that the "this smells like my vagina" candle "exploded" after having been burnt for three hours. A disclaimer has been added to the candles' pages instructing users to not burn the candles for more than two hours at a time.

=== Parodies ===
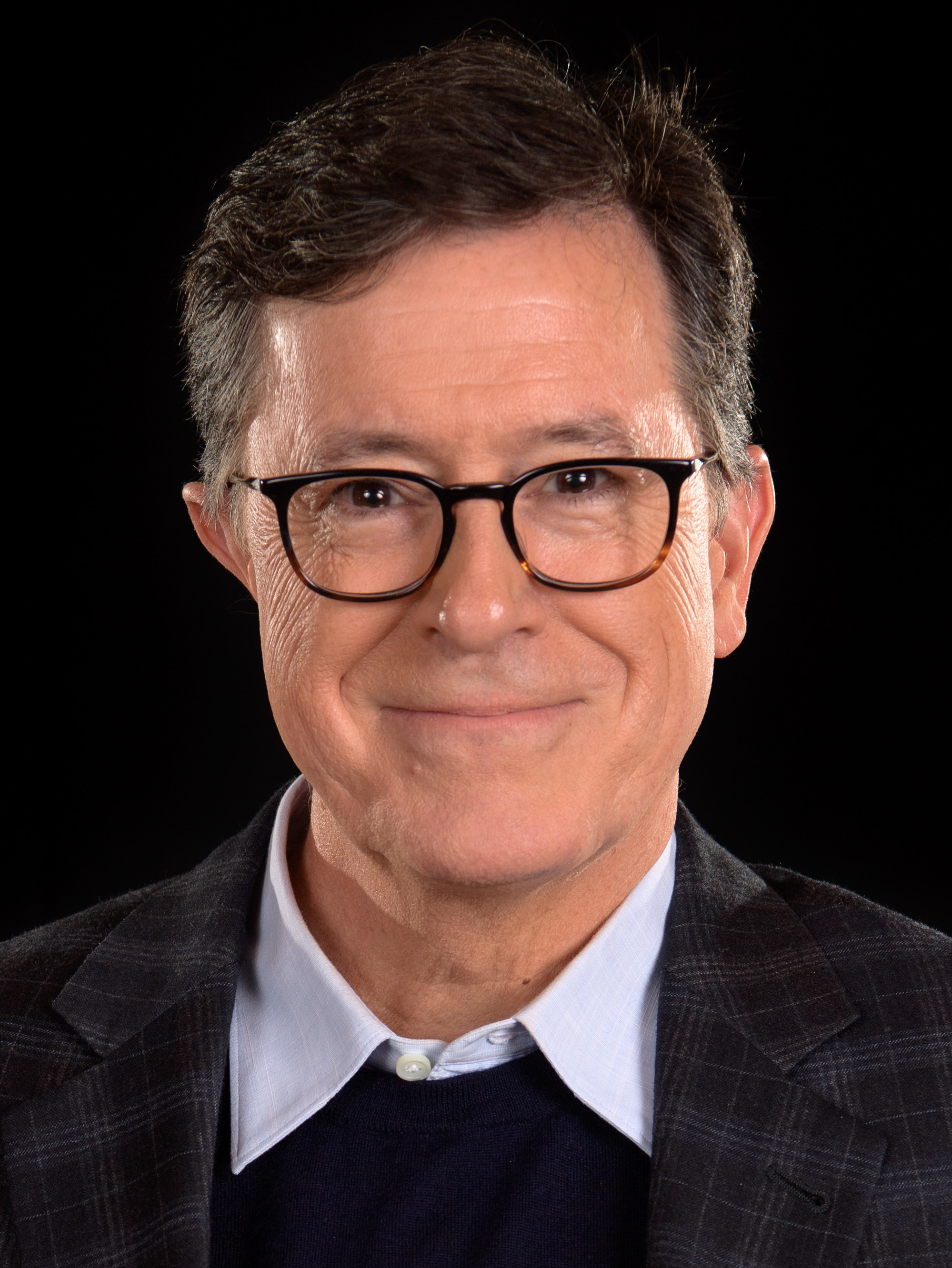
Stephen Colbert collaborated with Paltrow on Covetton House, a parody wellness brand

In December 2016, a book parodying Goop called Glop: Nontoxic Ideas That Will Make You Look Ridiculous and Feel Pretentious was published and included advice such as: "Our modern lifestyles are absolutely full of toxins—nearly everything we come into daily contact with, from Egyptian cotton sheets to 8-carat diamonds to yacht paint, is dangerously noxious."

By June 2017, the New York Times reported that parodying Goop had "become a national pastime".

In September 2015, The Late Show host Stephen Colbert began a recurring sketch about his spoof lifestyle brand Covetton House, which promotes everyday products with fancy names and jacked-up prices. Paltrow appeared on an episode in January 2018 announcing a collaboration between Goop and Covetton House, featuring a sponge which cost $900. In April 2018, Colbert and Paltrow collaborated on a line of goods to raise money for education in the United States.

In March 2018, Botnik Studios created a newsletter called "goob" parodying Goop, which generated text using predictive text; headlines included "Listen to Your Body: Your Migraines are Podcasts Trying to be Produced."

In October 2018, Heidi Gardner appeared on the Weekend Update segment of Saturday Night Live as "Baskin Johns," a Goop employee, parodying the company as a new employee who knows little about the products she is promoting. The character reappeared in a March 2019 episode of the show, this time with a surprise appearance of Paltrow as "Fifer James," Baskin's manager.

A performance artist sold "Hot Dog Water" outside the fourth In Goop Health summit, a bottle of water with a hotdog inside, which parodied a product sold on Goop with a crystal inside a bottle of water.

In the ninth season of Modern Family, Mira Sorvino plays the recurring character Nicole Rosemary Page, a parody of Paltrow, with the character also being a founder of Nerp, a company similar to Goop.

Toni Collette's character "Joni" in Knives Out (2019) runs a similar wellness "lifestyle brand" company called Flam.
