= Sirens (Cher Lloyd song) =

2014 single by Cher Lloyd

- EP artwork cover

Single by Cher Lloyd

from the album Sorry I'm Late
- Released: 17 March 2014
- Recorded: 2013
- Genre: Pop; R&B
- Length: 3:55
- Label: Epic; Sony
- Songwriters: Ina Wroldsen; Rami Yacoub; Carl Falk; Cher Lloyd
- Producers: Yacoub; Falk

Cher Lloyd singles chronology
"I Wish" (2013)	"Sirens" (2014)	"Really Don't Care" (2014)

Music video
- "Sirens" on YouTube

"Sirens" is a song by British singer Cher Lloyd. The song premiered on 14 March 2014 on Sirius XM Hits 1, and was later released on 17 March 2014. It is the second and final single from her second album, Sorry I'm Late (2014). "Sirens" was praised by critics for the song's mature sound, Lloyd's vocals, and the change in direction from her previous work.

== Critical reception ==
4Music called the song "an absolute banger" and said "the former X Factor star has already began cracking the American market with her previous album, and with her latest offering—a catchy ballad with heart and soul—a massive break seems inevitable." Kalyna Taras of ANDPOP stated "Even if you’re not the romantic type, 'Sirens' will move you. Cher's powerful, raspy voice was made for this song. A ballad about looking for love and finding a peaceful moment with the one you love, 'Sirens' hits the heart." Online site Sugarscape rated the song 10/10, claiming it "ridiculously amazing" and "quite incredible." Idolator's Carl Williott said "the production is pretty standard pop fare, with a few hints of electronics whooshing in and out, but everything evaporates for the first bars of its truly triumphant chorus, before it all swoops back in to lift the vocals even higher" and further claimed that "it was completely worth the wait." Bradley Stern of MuuMuse said that "[Sirens] is a soaring follow–up to 'I Wish'—and it's a proper SMASH," going on to state "striding into the speakers on a gentle guitar strum, Lloyd drops the swag shtick and supplies us instead with a full–bodied, super grown up midtempo power ballad of mega–proportions: That chorus is just, like, whooooooosh," and further labelling it "massive and glorious."

== Music video ==
The music video for "Sirens" premiered on Lloyd's Vevo channel on 29 April 2014 and was directed by Darren Craig. In the "Behind the Scenes" footage, Lloyd revealed that the story of the video was inspired by a similar event from her childhood, and that the young daughter in the video represents herself at a younger age.

=== Critical reception ===
Like the song itself, the music video for "Sirens" received highly positive reviews from critics, with many praising the honest story, Lloyd's emotional performance, and the maturity in comparison to her previous music videos. John Walker of MTV said it was "alarming to see her channel such isolation and pain" and went on to say "The Uprising Creative LLC–directed clip presents Cher as a woman in pain, silently watching the drug–dealing father of her child do 'business' in their kitchen as her world slowly crumbles around her." Idolator's Robbie Daw claimed "the video takes the whole affair to a more emotional level, as the story of a woman bound to her drug–dealing boyfriend plays out. His eventual arrest leaves Cher sobbing in a hallway, until at last she embroils herself in the whole mess by running out of the house with his stash and burns it to protect him. The final moments of the 'Sirens' visual reveal that the tie that binds Lloyd to her troubled paramour is a young daughter." Online site Sugarscape said that it is "moody and meaningful" and suggested that "everyone in the UK's gonna be a bit like 'say whaaaaat?' when she comes back over."

== Live performances ==
On 14 March 2014, the day of the song's premiere, Sirius XM Radio uploaded a live acoustic performance of the single. Lloyd also performed it at Demi Lovato's Neon Lights Tour, at which she was a supporting act.

== Track listing ==
Digital download
No.	Title	Length
1.	"Sirens"	3:55

Digital EP
No.	Title	Length
1.	"Sirens" (Radio Edit)	3:48
2.	"Sirens" (Jenaux Remix)	3:23
3.	"Human" (Live at Swinghouse Studios)	2:38
4.	"Sirens" (Instrumental Version)	3:54

== Charts ==
Chart (2014)	Peak position
Ireland (IRMA)	53
Russia Airplay (Tophit)	206
Scottish Singles Sales (Official Charts)	20
UK Singles (Official Charts)	41
US Pop Digital Songs (Billboard)	48

== Release history ==
Region	Date	Format	Label	Ref.
United States	17 March 2014	Digital download	Epic; Sony	
Italy	30 May 2014	Contemporary hit radio	Epic; Sony	
United Kingdom	18 July 2014	Digital download	Epic; Sony	
United Kingdom	20 July 2014	Digital download (EP)	Epic; Sony	
