= Oxygen (TV network) =

American television network

- Country: United States
- Headquarters: 229 West 43rd Street; New York, New York

Programming
- Language: English
- Picture format: 1080i HDTV; (downscaled to letterboxed 480i for the SDTV feed)

Ownership
- Owner: Versant
- Sister channels: CNBC; E!; Golf Channel; MS NOW; Syfy; USA Network

History
- Founded: 1998; 28 years ago
- Launched: February 1, 2000; 26 years ago
- Founder: Marcy Carsey; Lisa Gersh; Geraldine Laybourne; Caryn Mandabach; Tom Werner; Oprah Winfrey

Links
- Website: oxygen.com

Availability

Terrestrial
- Digital terrestrial television: See § Over-the-air affiliates

Streaming media
- DirecTV Stream; fuboTV; Hulu + Live TV; Sling TV; YouTube TV
- ClaroTV+: (requires subscription to access content): ch.185

Oxygen (branded on air as Oxygen True Crime) is an American cable and digital multicast television network owned by Versant. The network primarily airs true crime television series and police procedural dramas.

The channel launched on February 1, 2000, under the ownership of Oxygen Media, a consortium including Geraldine Laybourne and Oprah Winfrey among other stakeholders. It originally carried a format of lifestyle and entertainment programming oriented towards women. Oxygen Media was acquired by NBCUniversal in 2007 for nearly $1 billion, after which the channel began to place a stronger focus on targeting young adult women. After the network experienced ratings success with a programming block dedicated to such programming, Oxygen was relaunched in mid-2017 to focus primarily on true crime programs and crime dramas. Oxygen is among the NBCUniversal channels that transferred into Versant in 2025.

The channel initially operated as a cable network; in 2022, Oxygen began to also operate as a digital multicast television network on subchannels over-the-air. As of November 2023, Oxygen is available to approximately 59 million pay television households in the United States, down from its 2012 peak of 80 million households.

== History ==
Until 2004, the entire word was in smaller case letters.

The privately held company Oxygen Media was founded in 1998 by former Nickelodeon executive Geraldine Laybourne, talk-show host Oprah Winfrey, media executive Lisa Gersh, and Carsey-Werner producers Marcy Carsey, Tom Werner and Caryn Mandabach. Laybourne was the company's founder, chairwoman, and CEO, remaining with the channel until the NBCUniversal sale. The company's subscription network Oxygen launched on February 1, 2000.

Oxygen's first headquarters were at Battery Park City in New York City, near the World Trade Center. During the September 11 attacks, the network temporarily went off the air; a simulcast of Time Warner Cable-owned regional news channel NY1 was carried by Oxygen's channel space until the studio reopened within a week after the attack. Oxygen's operations were later consolidated at Chelsea Market, a former Nabisco factory at 15th Street and Ninth Avenue in New York City.

Prior to 2005, the channel carried a limited schedule of regular season WNBA games produced by NBA TV. The channel later began to focus chiefly on reality shows, reruns, and movies. For a time during the talk show's syndication run, Oxygen aired week-delayed repeats of The Tyra Banks Show. The yoga/meditation/exercise program Inhale was the last inaugural Oxygen program on air into the channel's NBC Universal era, albeit in repeats; it was cancelled in 2010.

Several original reality series targeting women also aired on the network, including Campus Ladies, Bliss, Oprah After the Show, Talk Sex with Sue Johanson, The Janice Dickinson Modeling Agency, Snapped, Girls Behaving Badly and Bad Girls Club. Oxygen launched with immediate DirecTV carriage at launch, and was added to Dish Network in early 2006, during that provider's carriage conflict with Lifetime.

=== Acquisition by NBC Universal ===
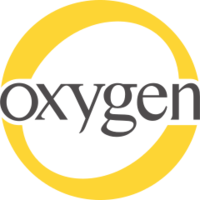
Oxygen logo (2008–2014)

In August 2007, rumors emerged that NBCUniversal had made offers to acquire Oxygen, with the network reportedly recommending that Bravo Media head Lauren Zalaznick lead the network post-acquisition. It was reported that the network had been pursuing offers of at least $1 billion (referred to internally as "BET money", in reference to Viacom's earlier acquisition of the channel). On October 9, 2007, NBC Universal announced it would be acquiring Oxygen for $925 million.

The sale was completed on November 20, 2007, with Zalaznick appointed head of Oxygen. NBCU cable head Jeff Gaspin stated that Oxygen would be marketed to advertisers alongside sister properties targeting an "upscale" female audience, such as Bravo, iVillage, and Today. Some of Oxygen's executives departed during the integration, including Laybourne and president of programming Debby Beece, with Gersh transitioning to roles at other NBCU divisions (including The Weather Channel, and later NBC News).

In April 2008, during its first upfronts under NBCU ownership, Oxygen announced a planned rebranding to take effect that June. This would include a new logo and slogan ("Live Out Loud"), establishing women 18-49 (with a particular emphasis on "young, trend-obsessed" women 18–34) as the network's target demographic, and relaunching its website with a larger focus on video content from its shows. It also announced several series in development, such as Coolio's Rules and Dance Your Ass Off. During the 2008 Summer Olympics, Oxygen aired a two-hour block of coverage on weekday evenings as part of NBC Sports' overall coverage. Oxygen focused primarily on coverage of the gymnastics competitions.

The June 29, 2009 premiere of Dance Your Ass Off was Oxygen's highest-rated series premiere at the time, with an average of 1.3 million viewers. A high definition simulcast feed launched in March 2011. On May 21, 2013, the premiere of the Bad Girls Club spin-off Bad Girls All-Star Battle became Oxygen's highest-rated series premiere to-date, with 1.73 million viewers. With a Bad Girls Club: Atlanta reunion special as a lead-in (which drew a series high of nearly 2 million viewers), Nielsen estimated that Oxygen had achieved its highest-rated night of key demographic viewership to-date, and the top two programs on cable that evening.

Following the acquisition of NBC Universal by Comcast and the last-minute replacement of its sister channel Style Network with Esquire Network (which was originally intended to replace G4) on September 23, 2013, some of its acquired programs were moved to Oxygen.

Oxygen logo (2014–2017)

In April 2014, as part of a gradual refocusing of NBCU's women's cable networks by new division head Bonnie Hammer, and the appointment of Frances Berwick as the head of Oxygen and Bravo, it was revealed that Oxygen would undergo a shift in its programming strategy to focus on a "modern", young female audience. Berwick explained that the new slate, which included upcoming series such as Fix My Choir, Funny Girls, Nail'd It, Sisterhood of Hip Hop, Street Art Throwdown, and planned spin-offs of Preachers of L.A., would "deliver on the freshness, authenticity, high emotional stakes and optimism that this demographic is looking for", and that many of the new programs would "appeal to things that are important in the lives of young, millennial women" and be "authentic". As part of the refocusing, the network also introduced a new slogan, "Very Real".

=== Refocus on true crime and Versant spin-off ===
In December 2016, it was reported that NBCUniversal was considering rebranding Oxygen as a true crime-oriented channel. Since 2015, the genre had seen growing interest, especially among young adult women. The network had introduced a primetime block known as Crime Time on Fridays through Mondays (anchored by series such as Snapped), which had helped Oxygen see a 42% increase in total viewership, and a 22% increase among women 25–54. NBCUniversal had reportedly been in talks with Dick Wolf (producer of NBC's Law & Order and Chicago franchises) to take an equity stake in a rebranded channel that could be led by reruns of the programs. In January 2017, the network also began a related foray into podcasting, with the true crime series Martinis & Murder.

In February 2017, NBCUniversal confirmed that it planned to reformat Oxygen with a focus on true crime programming aimed towards women. The change was accompanied by a larger rebranding later in the year, with a new police tape-inspired logo. Oxygen's new lineup was built largely around its existing library of unscripted true-crime programming (such as Snapped), and reruns of police procedurals such as the CSI and NCIS franchises. Berwick stated that the network had not determined the fate of its non-crime programming, such as Bad Girls Club, after the full rebranding took effect.

During its upfront presentations, Oxygen unveiled other new crime programs that were in development for the 2017–2018 season, such the new Dick Wolf series Criminal Confessions, a docuseries on the murder of Jessica Chambers co-produced with NBCUniversal-funded BuzzFeed, and a new season of Wolf's Cold Justice (which had been originally cancelled by TNT). In September 2017, Oxygen and USA Network acquired off-network reruns of Chicago P.D., which were added to their schedules in October 2017.

In November 2024, Comcast announced its intent to spin off most of NBCUniversal's cable properties (including Oxygen) into a new public company, now known as Versant.

== International ==
On October 17, 2024, NBCUniversal announced an agreement with Bell Media to launch a Canadian version of Oxygen on January 1, 2025; the channel formerly operated as a Canadian version of Oxygen's competitor Investigation Discovery, before the rights to Warner Bros. Discovery's non-scripted television brands moved to Rogers Sports & Media.

== Programming ==
=== Current ===
- 911 Crisis Center
- A Plan To Kill
- Accident, Suicide or Murder
- Blood & Money
- Buried in the Backyard
- Cold Justice
- Dateline: Secrets Uncovered
- Dateline: Unforgettable
- Deadly Waters With Captain Lee
- Fatal Family Feuds
- Final Moments
- Floribama Murders
- Homicide for the Holidays
- Kill or Be Killed
- Killer Siblings
- Living with a Serial Killer
- Mark of a Killer
- Philly Homicide
- Prosecuting Evil with Kelly Siegler
- Sin City Murders
- Sins of the South
- Snapped
- Snapped: Killer Couples
- The Death Investigator with Barbara Butcher
- The Real Murders of Atlanta
- The Real Murders of Los Angeles
- The Real Murders of Orange County
- Twisted Killers
- Unknown Serial Killers of America

=== Former ===
- 50 Funniest Women Alive
- Addicted to Beauty
- All About Aubrey
- All My Babies' Mamas
- All the Right Moves
- As She Sees It
- Bachelorette Party: Las Vegas
- Bad Girls All-Star Battle
- Bad Girls Club
- Bad Girls Club: Afterparty
- Bad Girls Club: Flo Gets Married
- Bad Girls Road Trip
- Battle of the Ex Besties
- Behind the Shield
- Best Ink
- Birth Stories
- Bliss
- Breaking Up with Shannen Doherty
- Breakup Girl
- Bring Home the Exotic
- Brooklyn 11223
- Campus Ladies
- Can You Tell?
- Candice Checks It Out
- Captured
- Celebrities Undercover
- Chasing Maria Menounos
- Cheryl Richardson's Lifestyle Makeovers
- Choose to Lead
- Coolio's Rules
- Conversations from the Edge with Carrie Fisher
- Criminal Confessions
- The DNA of Murder with Paul Holes
- Daily Remix
- Dance Your Ass Off
- Deadly Cults
- Death at the Mansion: Rebecca Zahau
- Debbie Travis' Painted House
- Deion & Pilar: Prime Time Love
- The Disappearance of Crystal Rogers
- The Disappearance of Maura Murray
- The Disappearance of Natalee Holloway
- The Disappearance of Phoenix Coldon
- The Disappearance of Susan Cox Powell
- Dogs with Jobs
- Douglas Family Gold
- Drastic Plastic Surgery
- Dying to Belong
- Eavesdropping with Alan Cummings
- eLove
- Exhale with Candice Bergen
- The Face
- Facelift
- Fight Girls
- Find Me My Man
- Fix My Choir
- Fix My Mom
- Florida Man Murders
- The Forgotten West Memphis Three
- Framed by the Killer
- Freeride with Greta Gaines
- Funny Girls
- The Girl in the Picture
- Girlfriend Confidential: LA
- Girls Behaving Badly
- The Glee Project
- Good Girls Don't
- Hair Battle Spectacular
- Hey Monie!
- Hollywood Unzipped: Stylist Wars
- House of Glam
- In Ice Cold Blood
- Injustice with Nancy Grace
- It Takes a Killer
- I'm Having Their Baby
- Inhale Yoga with Steve Ross
- The Isaac Mizrahi Show
- Inshallah: Diary of an Afghan Woman
- Ivana Young Man
- I've Got a Secret
- Jane By Design
- Janice & Abbey
- The Janice Dickinson Modeling Agency
- Jersey Couture
- The Jury Speaks
- Just Cause
- ka-Ching
- Keisha and Kaseem
- Kids Behaving Badly
- Killer Affair
- Killer Motive
- Killerpost
- Killision Course
- Kim Kardashian West: The Justice Project
- Last Squad Standing
- Laura Pedersen's Your Money and Your Life
- License to Kill
- A Lie to Die For
- Life & Style
- Life's a Bitch
- Like A Boss
- Living Different
- Living With Funny
- Love Games: Bad Girls Need Love Too
- Making It Big
- Man Talk with Carrie Fisher
- Me Time
- Mo'Nique's Fat Chance
- Movies@Oxygen
- Mr. Romance
- Murdered by Morning
- My Big Fat Revenge
- My Crazy Love
- My Shopping Addiction
- Murder and Justice: The Case of Martha Moxley
- Nail'd It!
- Naked Josh
- The Naughty Kitchen with Chef Blythe Beck
- The Next Big Thing: NY
- Nice Package
- O2Be
- Oprah After the Show
- Oprah Goes Online
- Our Bodies, Myself (web series only)
- Oxygen Movies
- Oxygen Sports
- Oxygen's 25iest
- Pajama Party
- Peep Show (as the first US telecaster; the UK sitcom was initially paired with the Canadian Show Me Yours as a Saturday-night provocative comedy bloc.)
- Player Gets Played
- Policewomen Files
- Pond Life
- The Prancing Elites Project
- Preachers of Atlanta
- Preachers of Detroit
- Preachers of L.A.
- Pretty Wicked
- Pure Oxygen
- Quigley's Village
- Real Families
- Relentless
- Real Weddings From the Knot
- Repo Girls
- Ripe Tomatoes
- Running Russell Simmons
- SheCommerce
- Show Me Yours
- Sisterhood of Hip Hop
- Skin Deep
- Snapped: She Made Me Do It
- Sports Aside
- Show Me Yours
- Street Art Throwdown
- Strut
- Sunday Night Sex Show
- Talk Sex with Sue Johanson
- Tanisha Gets Married
- Tattoos After Dark
- Tease
- Three Days to Live
- Too Young to Marry?
- Top Model Obsessed
- Tracey Ullman's Visible Panty Lines
- Trackers
- Tori & Dean: Home Sweet Hollywood
- Tori & Dean: Inn Love
- Tori & Dean: sTORIbook Weddings
- Trippin' with May Lee
- An Unexpected Killer
- Unprotected
- Unspeakable Crime: The Killing of Jessica Chambers
- Up and Vanished
- Use Your Life
- Violent Minds: Killers on Tape
- A Wedding and a Murder
- We Sweat
- Who Cares About Girls?
- Who Does She Think She Is?
- Who Needs Hollywood?
- Women and the Badge
- The World According to Paris
- Worst.Post.Ever, with Frankie Grande
- Worth the Risk
- X-Chromosome
- You're on TV

==== Syndicated ====
- Absolutely Fabulous
- America's Got Talent (2011–2012)
- America's Next Top Model (2007–2015)
- Buffy the Vampire Slayer (2010–2012)
- Burn Notice (2013-2016)
- Chicago P.D. (2015–2017)
- CSI: Crime Scene Investigation (2012–2016)
- Cybill (2005–2008)
- A Different World (2006–2009)
- Ellen (2002–2007)
- The Ellen DeGeneres Show (2005–2007)
- Glee (2012–2015)
- Grace Under Fire (2003–2006)
- House (2011–2013)
- Kate & Allie (2001–2004)
- La Femme Nikita (2001–2004)
- Law & Order: Criminal Intent (2009–2012)
- Living Single (2005–2013)
- Mad About You (2007–2010)
- Minute to Win It (2012–2013)
- My Wife and Kids (2014–2017)
- NCIS (2009–2016)
- Ned and Stacey (2004–2008)
- Nighty Night
- Roseanne (2003–2012)
- Suburban Shootout
- Xena: Warrior Princess (2002–2007)

== Over-the-air affiliates ==
On May 2, 2022, NBC Owned Television Stations began to carry Oxygen as a subchannel on digital terrestrial television, primarily on NBC and Telemundo owned and operated stations. With Oxygen's spinoff to Versant, it is unknown if NBC Owned Television Stations will continue carrying the channel.

List of Oxygen affiliates
Media market	State/District	Station	Channel
Birmingham	Alabama	WBRC-DT4	6.4
Mobile	Alabama	WALA-DT6	10.6
Montgomery	Alabama	WSFA-DT6	12.6
Phoenix	Arizona	KTAZ-DT5	39.5
Tucson	Arizona	KHRR-DT4	40.4
Little Rock	Arkansas	KWMO-LD6	34.6
Bakersfield	California	KTLD-CD4	8.4
Fresno	California	KNSO-DT5	51.5
Los Angeles	California	KNBC-DT3	4.3
Sacramento	California	KCSO-LD6	33.6
San Diego	California	KNSD-DT4	39.4
San Francisco	California	KSTS-DT6	48.6
Denver	Colorado	KDEN-DT5	25.5
Hartford–New Haven	Connecticut	WVIT-DT4	30.4
Washington	District of Columbia	WRC-DT4	4.4
Jacksonville	Florida	WODH-LD5	34.5
Miami–Fort Lauderdale	Florida	WTVJ-DT4	6.4
Tampa	Florida	WRMD-CD4	49.4
West Palm Beach	Florida	WFLX-DT4	29.4
Atlanta	Georgia	WXIA-DT5	11.5
Columbus	Georgia	WTVM-DT7	9.7
Savannah	Georgia	WDID-LD7	26.7
Honolulu	Hawaii	KHNL-DT4	13.4
Boise	Idaho	KFLL-LD3	25.3
Boise	Idaho	KNIN-DT3	9.3
Chicago	Illinois	WMAQ-DT3	5.3
Springfield	Illinois	WCQA-LD8	16.8
Evansville	Indiana	WEHT	25.4
Evansville	Indiana	WEIN-LD3	40.3
Fort Wayne	Indiana	WCUH-LD5	16.5
Indianapolis	Indiana	WUDZ-LD6	28.6
South Bend	Indiana	WNDU-DT6	16.6
Des Moines	Iowa	KAJR-LD7	36.7
Topeka	Kansas	WIBW-DT7	13.7
Wichita	Kansas	KFVT-LD4	34.4
Bowling Green	Kentucky	WBKO-DT5	13.5
Alexandria	Louisiana	KALB-DT5	5.6
Baton Rouge	Louisiana	WAFB-DT7	9.7
New Orleans	Louisiana	WTNO-CD4	22.4
New Orleans	Louisiana	WVUE-DT5	8.5
Boston	Massachusetts	WNEU-DT4	15.4
Detroit	Michigan	WDWO-CD3	18.3
Marquette	Michigan	WLUC-DT5	6.5
Midland	Michigan	W35DQ-D6	24.6
Traverse City	Michigan	W36FH-D3	36.3
Mankato	Minnesota	KEYC-DT5	12.5
Cape Girardeau	Missouri	KFVS-DT6	15.6
Jefferson City	Missouri	K35OY-D3	35.3
Joplin	Missouri	KRLJ-LD6	45.6
Kansas City	Missouri	KAJF-LD6	21.6
Springfield	Missouri	KOZL-DT4	27.4
Springfield	Missouri	KCNH-LD3	47.3
St. Louis	Missouri	KSDK-DT6	5.6
Hastings	Nebraska	KNHL-DT5	5.5
Lincoln	Nebraska	KSNB-DT5	4.5
Omaha	Nebraska	KAJS-LD5	33.5
Las Vegas	Nevada	KBLR-DT5	39.5
Reno	Nevada	K07AAI-D2	12.2
Albuquerque	New Mexico	KUPT-LD4	2.4
Buffalo	New York	WGRZ-DT5	2.5
New York City	New York	WNBC-DT4	4.4
Saranac Lake	New York	WYCI-DT5	40.5
Watertown	New York	WWNY-DT5	7.5
Charlotte	North Carolina	WBTV-DT5	3.5
Washington	North Carolina	WITN-DT7	7.7
Wilmington	North Carolina	WECT-DT7	6.7
Fargo	North Dakota	K15MR-D2	51.2
Cleveland	Ohio	WUAB-DT3	43.3
Columbus	Ohio	WDEM-CD2	17.2
Oklahoma City	Oklahoma	KOPX-DT7	62.7
Tulsa	Oklahoma	KZLL-LD6	39.6
Tulsa	Oklahoma	KUOC-LD6	48.6
Portland	Oregon	KPTV-DT4	12.4
Portland	Oregon	KOXI-CD5	20.5
Philadelphia	Pennsylvania	WCAU-DT4	10.4
Pittsburgh	Pennsylvania	WJMB-CD2	60.2
Pittsburgh	Pennsylvania	WMVH-CD3	26.3
Pittsburgh	Pennsylvania	WWKH-CD3	35.3
Pittsburgh	Pennsylvania	WWLM-CD3	20.3
Providence	Rhode Island	WRIW-CD3	51.3
Columbia	South Carolina	WIS-DT5	10.5
Florence	South Carolina	W33DN-D3	16.3
Rapid City	South Dakota	KHME-DT5	23.5
Knoxville	Tennessee	WVLT-DT5	8.5
Memphis	Tennessee	WMC-DT4	5.4
Nashville	Tennessee	WSMV-DT4	4.4
Amarillo	Texas	KFDA-DT6	10.6
Austin	Texas	KVAT-LD8	17.8
Corpus Christi	Texas	K21OC-D5	54.5
Corpus Christi	Texas	K32OC-D7	29.7
Dallas–Fort Worth	Texas	KXAS-DT4	5.4
El Paso	Texas	KTDO-DT5	48.5
Houston	Texas	KTMD-DT3	47.3
Lubbock	Texas	KNKC-LD4	29.4
Harlingen–McAllen	Texas	KTLM-DT5	40.5
San Antonio	Texas	KVDA-DT5	60.5
Tyler	Texas	KLTV-DT6	7.6
Waco	Texas	KWTX-DT5	10.5
Salt Lake City	Utah	KTMW-DT3	20.5
Richmond	Virginia	WZTD-LD3	45.3
Pasco	Washington	K28QK-D2	22.2
Seattle–Tacoma	Washington	KUSE-LD5	46.5
Charleston–Huntington	West Virginia	WOCW-LD7	21.7
Clarksburg	West Virginia	WVFX-DT6	10.6
Green Bay–Milwaukee	Wisconsin	WIWN-DT5	68.5
Madison	Wisconsin	W23BW-D7	23.7
Casper	Wyoming	KCWY-DT6	13.6
