= Santa Claus, Georgia =

- City
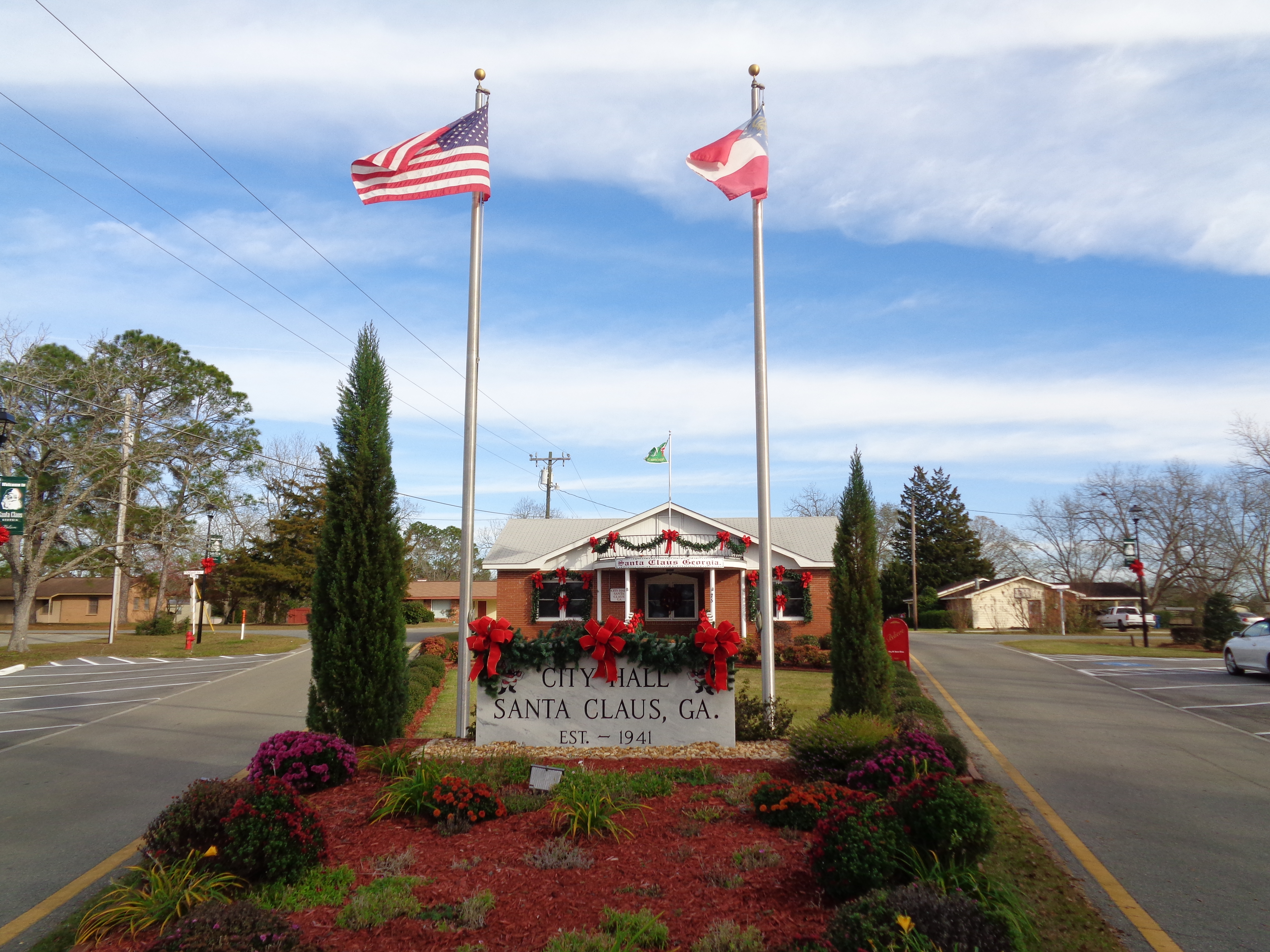
- Santa Claus City Hall

- Flag Seal

- Location in Toombs County and the state of Georgia
- Coordinates: 32°10′15″N 82°19′52″W
- Country: United States
- State: Georgia
- County: Toombs

Area
  - Total: 0.19 sq mi (0.48 km^{2})
  - Land: 0.19 sq mi (0.48 km^{2})
  - Water: 0 sq mi (0.00 km^{2})
- Elevation: 236 ft (72 m)

Population (2020)
  - Total: 204
  - Density: 1,106.5/sq mi (427.23/km^{2})
- Time zone: UTC-5 (Eastern (EST))
  - Summer (DST): UTC-4 (EDT)
- ZIP code: 30436
- Area code: 912
- FIPS code: 13-68600
- GNIS feature ID: 0322506
- Website: https://cityofsantaclaus.org/

Santa Claus is a city in Toombs County, Georgia, United States. The population was 204 at the 2020 census. It is part of the Vidalia micropolitan area.

The city has several Christmas-themed street names: Candy Cane Road, December Drive, Rudolph Way, Dancer Street, Prancer Street, and Sleigh Street.

== History ==
A local entrepreneur named the community after Santa Claus, the Christmas figure, with the aim of attracting tourists to his pecan business and adjacent motel. Santa Claus was incorporated as a city in 1941.

== Geography ==
Santa Claus is located at 32°10′15″N 82°19′52″W (32.170863, -82.331129). It is just off U.S. Route 1.

According to the United States Census Bureau, the city has a total area of 0.2 square mile (0.5 km^{2}), all land.

== Demographics ==
Historical population
Census	Pop.	Note	%±
1960	5		—
1970	118		2,260.0%
1980	167		41.5%
1990	154		−7.8%
2000	237		53.9%
2010	165		−30.4%
2020	204		23.6%
U.S. Decennial Census

As of the census of 2000, there were 250 people, 92 households, and 66 families residing in the city. By 2020, its population declined to 204.
