= Jupiter Thanksgiving murders =

Mass shooting in Florida, U.S.

2009 Thanksgiving murders
- Location: Jupiter, Florida, U.S.
- Date: November 26, 2009
- Attack type: Mass shooting, Familicide
- Weapons: .308 Remington 700 bolt-action rifle w/ scope; .40-caliber semi-automatic handgun; .22-caliber handgun
- Deaths: 4
- Injuries: 1
- Perpetrator: Paul Merhige

On November 26, 2009, a man killed four members of his family in Jupiter, Florida, United States.

== Shooting ==
35-year-old Paul Michael Merhige waited three hours after eating before opening fire at his family's Thanksgiving dinner, shooting multiple family members. He began the shooting by muttering "I've been waiting 20 years to do this." His aunt, Raymonde Joseph, his twin sisters, Carla Merhige and Lisa Knight, as well as his 6-year-old cousin, Makayla Sitton, were killed in the shooting. Lisa Knight was pregnant at the time of the shooting. Her husband, Patrick Knight, was severely injured and spent three months in a coma.

== Background ==
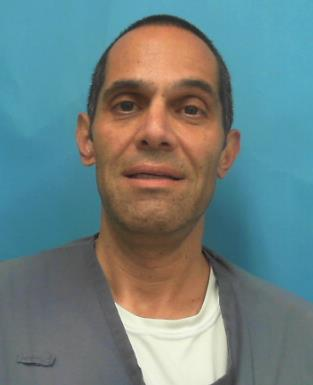
Paul Merhige FDOC photo

The family had a troubled past. In July 1973, Paul Merhige's aunt, Salwa Merrige-Abrams, murdered her ex-husband and two children before committing suicide by taking barbiturates.

Merhige's presence at the Thanksgiving gathering was seen as a surprise by the family, as he had been estranged for several years and even had a restraining order placed on him temporarily by one of his sisters. Merhige's parents had invited him to Thanksgiving without telling the Sittons, who were hosting the party.

== Aftermath ==
A manhunt for Merhige followed, with a $25,000 reward offered for information leading to his arrest.

On January 2, 2010, Merhige was arrested. On October 27, 2011, Paul Merhige pleaded guilty to all charges, and was sentenced to seven consecutive life sentences without parole.

The same year, on September 15, Jim and Muriel Sitton sued Paul's parents, with their reasoning being that they could have prevented the murders. The Sittons are Makayla's parents, and Muriel is Raymonde Joseph's daughter. In 2014, 4th District Court of Appeal ruled that Merhige's parents could not be held liable for the massacre.
