= Jill Avery =

Senior lecturer at Harvard Business School

Jill Avery is a senior lecturer of business administration at Harvard Business School and an expert on customer relationship management. She is also a teacher and a designer teaching MBA courses. Avery co-authored the Harvard Business Review's tool Go To Market Tools. In the 2016–17 academic year, The Case Centre named Avery a top 40 bestselling case author. She graduated from Wharton School of the University of Pennsylvania and Harvard Business School.

Avery was among the top 40 case authors consistently, since the list was first published in 2016 by The Case Centre. She ranked 14th In 2018/19, 16th in 2017/18, 28th in 2016/17 and 37th in 2015/16.
