= Jackson Guthy =

American singer-songwriter (born 1996)

- Born: March 19, 1996 (age 29)
- Origin: Los Angeles, California, United States
- Genres: Pop, rock
- Years active: 2011–present
- Labels: Velvet Hammer Music Management Group

Jackson Guthy (born March 19, 1996) is an American singer-songwriter.

== Biography ==
His is the son of Victoria Jackson and Bill Guthy. He started playing piano at age four when his older sister lost interest in her piano lessons and he picked them up; then began writing songs at age seven.

Guthy performed his debut single "Loving" on The Ellen DeGeneres Show in April 2011, and later released its video in August 2011. He was an opening act on Big Time Rush's "Better With U" North American Tour along with One Direction in 2012, and he performed his song "Make Up Your Mind" on that tour.

In April 2013, Guthy performed his latest singles "Roll" and "Everything You Do" on The Ellen DeGeneres Show in support of his new EP titled "Launch," which is due out later in 2013. The video for "Roll" was released on May 29, 2013, and currently has over 27,000 views on YouTube. Guthy opened for Big Time Rush and Victoria Justice on the 38-stop Summer Break Tour that kicked off on June 21, 2013. After, he opened for Cher Lloyd on her I Wish Tour through North America in September–October 2013. Jackson has also been on tour with Emblem3 and MKTO which started in February 2014 and the tour, #Bandlife, which ended in March 2014.

== North of Nine ==
After Guthy's tour with Emblem3 and MKTO, he was taken under Randy Jackson's wing and started looking for members to start a rock band. Together, Guthy and Jackson recruited roommates Rob and Michael, and shortly Nolan and Edison. Their first single released was titled "We Ride."

After the release of "We Ride," the band began writing for their EP released their first single off their EP titled "Can It Be You." The music video was exclusively featured on AskMen. On February 27, 2015, Billboard exclusively premiered a live studio version of their single "Can It Be You?".

North of Nine released their debut EP 'Alive' executively produced by Randy Jackson and Gavin Brown on March 10, 2015. On March 21, 2015, the band made their SXSW debut.

== Discography ==
Writing/Producing credits

- "Sensitive" – The Heavy Entertainment Show – Robbie Williams (2016) Co Writer

Singles

- "Loving" (2011)
- "Make Up Your Mind" (2012)
- "One of These Days" (2012)
- "Roll" (2013)
- "Everything You Do" (2013)
- "Bad Boy" (2013)
- "Brothers & Sisters" (2013)
- "Young & Single" (2014)
- "Two Little Lights" (2019)
- "Giants" (2019)
- "Giants (Fairlane Remix)" (2019)
- "what if it's not" (2020)
- "Like I did" (2022)
