= Miva (company) =

US ecommerce shopping cart software and hosting company

Miva, Inc.
- Industry: Ecommerce Software
- Predecessor: HTMLScript Corporation; Miva Merchant; Miva, Inc.
- Founded: 1996; 30 years ago
- Headquarters: San Diego, California, United States
- Website: www.miva.com

Miva, Inc. is a privately owned ecommerce shopping cart software and hosting company with headquarters in San Diego, California, and a data center in Tampa, Florida. Miva Merchant's ecommerce software runs on its proprietary scripting language, MIVA Script.

Rick Wilson has been CEO of the company since April 2017.

== History ==
Miva Merchant began in 1996 as the HTMLScript Corporation. In 1997, the company released its first catalogue-based ecommerce product, KoolKat. Shortly after KoolKat's release, the name of the company was changed to Miva, Inc, and KoolKat was renamed Miva Merchant. Since that time, there have been several updates to Miva Merchant's core software, leading up to the most recent version, Miva Merchant 9. Just prior to the release of MM9, the company name returned to Miva, Inc.

In 2003 the company was purchased by FindWhat.com which changed its name to Miva, Inc in 2005.

== Present day ==
In 2007, the company underwent significant management changes, and was acquired by a group of investors and original Miva, Inc employees. The company name was changed to Miva Merchant, Inc. at that time in order to differentiate itself from the original Miva, Inc.

In 2008, Miva Merchant released Miva Merchant 5.5, a core software update that added improved features and functionality.

In 2009, Miva Merchant became a certified provider with Chase Paymentech Orbital Gateway, which allows merchants to accept real-time credit card transactions and multiple payment types via Chase with their Miva Merchant-powered storefront.

In 2011, Miva Merchant released an add-on mobile framework, and a streaming update for current customers (PR8), both of which were mentioned by Miva Merchant President and COO Rick Wilson in a July 19 interview with Practical Ecommerce.

In January 2012, Miva Merchant was named one of the top ten e-commerce technology companies by BuiltWith Technology Usage Statistics.

Over the years, Miva Merchant has formed a number of strategic partnerships with businesses specializing in email marketing, product reviews, and related ecommerce applications.

Each March, Miva Merchant hosts a conference in San Diego, California, for developers, store owners, and other Miva Merchant community members.

In September 2014, Miva Merchant changed its company name back to Miva.

== Awards and recognitions ==
Miva ranked 15 out of the Union Tribune's Top 40 Workplaces in San Diego.

== See also ==
- Comparison of shopping cart software
- MIVA Script
