= Victoria Jackson (entrepreneur) =

American entrepreneur and writer

- Born: August 31, 1955 (age 70); New York City, New York, US
- Occupations: Entrepreneur, writer
- Spouse: Bill Guthy
- Children: 3, including Jackson

Victoria Jackson is an American entrepreneur and writer who ran the cosmetics business Victoria Jackson Cosmetics for many years. In 2008, after her daughter was diagnosed with neuromyelitis optica (NMO), Jackson and her husband established the Guthy-Jackson Charitable Foundation, funding research into NMO treatment and cures. In 2017, she was inducted into the National Women's Hall of Fame in Seneca Falls, New York.

Her son is singer and songwriter Jackson Guthy.

== Publications ==
- Jackson, Victoria; Yeaman, Micahel (2017). The power of rare: a blueprint for a medical revolution. New York: Villabella Press. ISBN 9780692928998. OCLC 1007728301.
- Jackson, Victoria; Guthy, Ali; Rivas, Mim Eichler (2012). Saving each other: a mystery illness, a search for a cure : a mother-daughter love story. New York: Vanguard Press. ISBN 9781593157340. OCLC 820817170.
- Jackson, Victoria; Calistro, Paddy (1993). Redefining beauty: discovering your individual beauty, enhancing your self-esteem. New York: Warner Books. ISBN 9780446517409.
- Jackson, Victoria; Cagan, Andrea; Kirkland, Douglas (2000). Make up your life: every woman's guide to the power of makeup. New York: HarperCollins. ISBN 9780060196394.
