= Mike Posner discography =

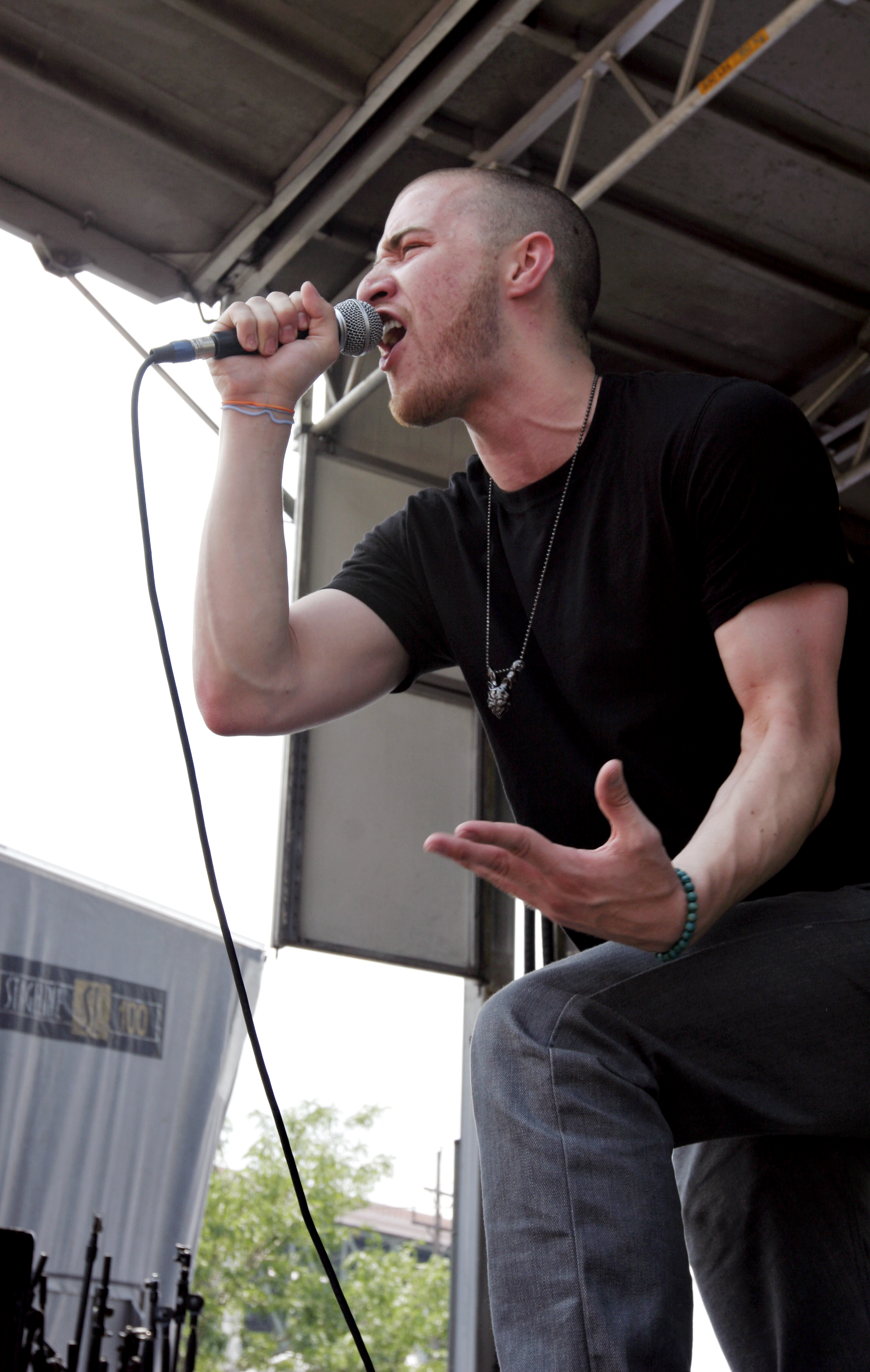
- Mike Posner, July 2010.
- Studio albums: 5
- Extended plays: 2
- Compilation albums: 1
- Singles: 42
- Music videos: 15
- Mixtapes: 4
- Poetry albums: 2

American singer and songwriter Mike Posner has released five studio albums, two extended plays, four mixtapes, two poetry albums, 42 singles (including eight as a featured artist), and 15 music videos (including one as a featured artist). Posner has written songs for Justin Bieber, Maroon 5, Labrinth, Nick Jonas, Nelly, Big Sean, Avicii, Austin Mahone and others.

Posner's debut studio album 31 Minutes to Takeoff was released on August 10, 2010. "Cooler than Me" was released as the lead single from the album on April 16, 2010. The song reached the top ten in the US peaking at number six, the song also peaked to number three in New Zealand and number three in Canada. It sold over 3,000,000 downloads in the US. "Please Don't Go" was released as the second single from the album on June 9, 2010, peaking at number 16 in the US. "Bow Chicka Wow Wow" was released as the third single from the album on February 3, 2011, and features vocals from American rapper Lil Wayne, peaking at number 30 in the US.

In 2016, his 2015 single "I Took a Pill in Ibiza" was remixed by Seeb and became his comeback hit after five years.

In 2025, Mike released the album The Beginning, containing songs about his life and self-reflection.

== Albums ==
=== Studio albums ===
Title	Details	Peak chart positions										Certifications
Title	Details	US	AUS	BEL (WA)	CAN	FRA	IRE	NOR	SWE	SWI	UK	Certifications
31 Minutes to Takeoff	Released: August 10, 2010; Format: CD, digital download; Label: J	8	—	—	32	120	—	—	—	—	178	RIAA: Platinum
At Night, Alone	Released: May 6, 2016; Format: CD, digital download, LP; Label: Island	12	60	96	6	184	87	11	18	63	79	GLF: Gold
A Real Good Kid	Released: January 18, 2019; Format: Digital download, CD, LP; Label: Island	—	—	—	—	—	—	—	—	—	—	
Operation: Wake Up	Released: December 18, 2020; Format: Digital download, CD, LP; Label: Island	—	—	—	—	—	—	—	—	—	—	
The Beginning	Released: February 21, 2025; Format: Digital; Label: Arista	—	—	—	—	—	—	—	—	—	—	
"—" denotes releases that did not chart or were not released in that territory.

=== Collaboration albums ===
Title	Details	Peak chart positions
Title	Details	US
Mansionz (with Blackbear)	Released: March 24, 2017; Format: Digital download, LP; Label: Beartrap, Monster Mountain, Island	67
Mansionz 2 (with Blackbear)	Released: October 31, 2023; Format: Digital download, LP; Label: Beartrap, Monster Mountain, Island	—
"—" denotes releases that did not chart or were not released in that territory.

=== Mixtapes ===
Title	Details
A Matter of Time	Released: February 28, 2009; Format: Digital download; Label: Independent
One Foot Out the Door	Released: October 28, 2009; Format: Digital download; Label: Independent
The Layover	Released: November 21, 2011; Format: Digital download; Label: Independent
Keep Going	Released: October 9, 2019; Format: Digital download; Label: Island

=== Poetry albums ===
Title	Details
I Was Born in Detroit on a Very Very Very Very Very Very Very Cold Day (with the Legendary Mike Posner Band)	Released: January 26, 2018; Format: Digital download; Label: Island
Tear Drops and Balloons	Released: March 7, 2018; Format: Digital download; Label: Monster Mountain

== Extended plays ==
Title	Details	Peak	
Title	Details	US	CAN
Cooler than Me	Release date: August 27, 2010; Format: Digital download; Label: J	—	—
The Truth	Release date: June 22, 2015; Format: Digital download; Label: Island	32	15
"—" denotes releases that did not chart or were not released in that territory.

== Singles ==
=== As lead artist ===
Title	Year	Peak chart positions										Certifications	Album
Title	Year	US	AUS	BEL (WA)	CAN	IRE	NOR	NLD	NZ	SWE	UK	Certifications	Album
"Cooler than Me"	2010	6	4	7	5	4	8	13	3	30	5	RIAA: 6× Platinum; ARIA: 3× Platinum; BPI: 3× Platinum; GLF: Gold; MC: Platinum; RMNZ: Platinum	A Matter of Time and 31 Minutes to Takeoff
"Please Don't Go"	2010	16	51	62	23	—	—	—	19	—	—	RIAA: 3× Platinum; ARIA: Gold; MC: Gold; RMNZ: Gold	31 Minutes to Takeoff
"Bow Chicka Wow Wow" (featuring Lil Wayne)	2011	30	40	—	—	—	—	—	21	—	—	RIAA: Platinum	31 Minutes to Takeoff
"Looks Like Sex"	2011	— (Note: "Looks Like Sex" did not enter the US Billboard Hot 100 but peaked on the Bubbling Under Hot 100 Singles chart at number 18.)	—	54	—	—	—	—	—	—	—		The Layover
"I Took a Pill in Ibiza" (Note: Chart entries are credited solely to Posner.) (solo or remix featuring Seeb)	2015	4	5	1	2	1	1	1	3	7	1	RIAA: 6× Platinum; ARIA: 3× Platinum; BEA: 3× Platinum; BPI: 4× Platinum; GLF: 8× Platinum; IFPI NOR: 3× Platinum; MC: 7× Platinum; NVPI: 6× Platinum; RMNZ: 2× Platinum	At Night, Alone.
"Be as You Are"	2016	—	—	—	—	—	—	—	—	—	—		At Night, Alone.
"Song About You"	2018	— (Note: "Song About You" did not enter the US Billboard Hot 100 but peaked on the Rock & Alternative Airplay chart at number 34.)	—	—	—	—	—	—	—	—	—		A Real Good Kid
"Stuck in the Middle"	2018	—	—	—	—	—	—	—	—	—	—		A Real Good Kid
"Move On"	2019	—	—	—	—	63	—	—	— (Note: "Move On" did not enter the NZ Top 40 Singles Chart, but peaked at number 31 on the NZ Hot Singles Chart.)	—	—		A Real Good Kid
"Noah's Ark"	2019	—	—	—	—	—	—	—	—	—	—		Keep Going
"Look What I've Become" (with Ty Dolla Sign)	2019	—	—	—	—	—	—	—	—	—	—		Keep Going
"Prince Akeem" (featuring Wiz Khalifa)	2019	—	—	—	—	—	—	—	—	—	—		Keep Going
"Slow It Down"	2019	—	—	—	—	—	—	—	—	—	—		Keep Going
"Nothing Is Wrong"	2019	—	—	—	—	—	—	—	—	—	—		Keep Going
"Legacy" (with Talib Kweli)	2019	—	—	—	—	—	—	—	—	—	—		Keep Going
"Live Before I Die" (with Naughty Boy)	2019	—	—	—	—	—	—	—	—	—	—		Non-album single
"Weaponry" (with Jessie J)	2020	—	—	—	—	—	—	—	— (Note: "Weaponry" did not enter the NZ Top 40 Singles Chart, but peaked at number 39 on the NZ Hot Singles Chart.)	—	—		Operation: Wake Up
"Momma Always Told Me" (featuring Stanaj and Yung Bae)	2021	—	—	—	—	—	—	—	—	—	—		Non-album singles
"Jealousy" (featuring Blackbear)	2021	—	—	—	—	—	—	—	— (Note: "Jealousy" did not enter the NZ Top 40 Singles Chart, but peaked at number 39 on the NZ Hot Singles Chart.)	—	—		Non-album singles
"Amor Fati" (featuring James Valentine and Jacob Scesney)	2021	—	—	—	—	—	—	—	—	—	—		Non-album singles
"Home"	2022	—	—	—	—	—	—	—	—	—	—		Non-album singles
"Turn Up" (with The Futuristics)	2022	—	—	—	—	—	—	—	—	—	—		Non-album singles
"I Hate Her Boyfriend's Face" (with PmBata)	2022	—	—	—	—	—	—	—	—	—	—		Non-album singles
"Madhouse" (with Masked Wolf)	2022	—	—	—	—	—	—	—	—	—	—		Non-album singles
"I'm Not Dead Yet"	2022	—	—	—	—	—	—	—	—	—	—		The Beginning
"Howling at the Moon" (with Salem Ilese)	2023	—	—	—	—	—	—	—	—	—	—		Non-album singles
"This Is What a Sad Song Sounds Like" (with The Human Experience)	2023	—	—	—	—	—	—	—	—	—	—		Non-album singles
"iTry" (with Brunchs)	2023	—	—	—	—	—	—	—	—	—	—		Non-album singles
"OMG"	2023	—	—	—	—	—	—	—	—	—	—		Non-album singles
"Is It Just Me?"	2025	—	—	—	—	—	—	—	—	—	—		The Beginning
"I Went Back to Ibiza"	2026	—	—	—	—	—	—	—	—	—	—		Non-album single
"—" denotes releases that did not chart or were not released in that territory.

=== As featured artist ===
Title	Year	Peak chart positions						Certifications	Album
Title	Year	US	AUS	BEL	IRE	NZ	UK	Certifications	Album
"With Ur Love" (Cher Lloyd featuring Mike Posner)	2011	— (Note: "With Ur Love" did not enter the Billboard Hot 100 but peaked on the Bubbling Under Hot 100 Singles chart at number one.)	43	61	5	16	4	ARIA: Platinum; BPI: Silver; RMNZ: Gold	Sticks + Stones
"Switch Lanes" (Rittz featuring Mike Posner)	2013	—	—	—	—	—	—		The Life and Times of Jonny Valiant
"L.A. Story" (Sammy Adams featuring Mike Posner)	2013	— (Note: "L.A. Story" did not enter the Billboard Hot 100 but peaked on the Bubbling Under Hot 100 Singles chart at number 20.)	—	—	—	—	—		Non-album single
"Crown" (Diplo featuring Mike Posner and Boaz van de Beatz)	2013	—	—	—	—	—	—		Revolution
"Told U So" (Yung Luv featuring Mike Posner, Envy and Semi Moto)	2015	—	—	—	—	—	—		Non-album singles
"Lemonade" (Adam Friedman featuring Mike Posner)	2016	—	—	—	—	—	—		Non-album singles
"Remember I Told You" (Nick Jonas featuring Anne-Marie and Mike Posner)	2017	—	89	—	—	—	97		Non-album singles
"—" denotes releases that did not chart or were not released in that territory.

=== Promotional singles ===
Title	Year	Peak chart positions	Album
Title	Year	AUS	Album
"Cheated"	2011	—	31 Minutes to Takeoff
"The Way It Used to Be"	2013	73	Non-album singles
"Top of the World" (featuring Big Sean)	2013	—	Non-album singles
"In the Arms of a Stranger" (Grey remix)	2017	—	At Night, Alone
"—" denotes releases that did not chart or were not released in that territory.

== Guest appearances ==
Title	Year	Other artist(s)	Album
"Ambiguous"	2010	Big Sean and Clinton Sparks	Finally Famous Vol. 3: Big
"On Fire (Drug Dealer Girl Part II)"	2011	Machine Gun Kelly	Rage Pack
"French Inhale"	2011	Snoop Dogg, Wiz Khalifa	Mac & Devin Go to High School
"In Town"	2012	2 Chainz	Based on a T.R.U. Story
"Woke Up"	2012	Big Sean, Early Mac, SayItAintTone and James Fauntleroy	Detroit
"Mittens Up"	2012	Dusty McFly and Elzhi	Buffies & Benihanas 1.5 (The Carryout)
"Flash"	2012	Iggy Azalea	Glory
"What It Is"	2012	Blackbear and Maejor	Sex, The Mixtape
"Anyone But Me"	2012	Blackbear	Sex, The Mixtape
"Switch Lanes"	2013	Rittz	The Life and Times of Jonny Valiant
"Always Gon Be"	2013	Rittz	The Life and Times of Jonny Valiant
"IDKurName"	2013	Clinton Sparks	My Awesome Mixtape 4
"The Spark"	2013	Statik Selektah, Action Bronson and Joey Badass	Extended Play
"We Own It (Fast & Furious)" (Remix)	2013	Travis Mills, Sammy Adams and Niykee Heaton	non-album single
"In My Zone"	2014	Rittz	Next to Nothing
"Going Through Hell"	2014	Rittz	Next to Nothing
"Closer"	2014	Nick Jonas	Nick Jonas
"Maybe You Love Me"	2014	Riff Raff	Neon Icon
"Got That"	2014	SRH	Broke and Happy
"Inside of the Groove"	2016	Rittz	Top of the Line
"Obvious"	2016	Blackbear	Drink Bleach
"On the Door"	2016	Amanda Palmer, Brendan Maclean, Ben Folds, Craig Ferguson, Eugene Mirman, Kirsten Vangsness, Neil Gaiman, Noah Britton, Patton Oswalt, Reggie Watts, Sarah Jones and Sarah Silverman	non-album single
"I Took a Pill in Ibiza"	2019	—N/a	Ninja TED: A benefit for the Vancouver Food Bank
"Let the Sunshine In"	2019	Ninja TED Cast	Ninja TED: A benefit for the Vancouver Food Bank

== Music videos ==
Title	Year	Director
As lead artist
"Drug Dealer Girl"	2009	
"Cooler Than Me"	2010	Jason Beattie
"Please Don't Go"	2010	BBGUN
"Bow Chicka Wow Wow" (Mike Posner featuring Lil Wayne)	2011	Shane Drake
"Looks Like Sex"	2012	Jason Beattie
"A Perfect Mess"	2012	SPIFFTvFilms
"We Own It (Fast & Furious)" (Remix) (featuring Travis Mills, Sammy Adams and Niykee Heaton)	2013	Mike Posner
"The Way It Used to Be"	2013	Marcus Raboy
"Top of the World" (Mike Posner featuring Big Sean)	2013	Jon Jon Augustavo
"My Light"	2014	Lawrence Chen
"Be As You Are"	2015	
"I Took a Pill in Ibiza" (Seeb Remix)	2016	Jon Jon Augustavo
"Song About You"	2018	
"I'm Not Dead Yet"	2022	
As featured artist
"With Ur Love" (Cher Lloyd featuring Mike Posner)	2011	Mike Sharpe

== Writing credits ==
Title	Year	Artist	Album	Role
"Don't Tell Me You Love Me"	2011	Big Sean	Finally Famous	Writer
"Windows Down"	2011	Big Time Rush	Elevate	Writer
"French Inhale"	2011	Wiz Khalifa and Snoop Dogg	Mac & Devin Go to High School	Writer, Artist
"Boyfriend"	2012	Justin Bieber	Believe	Producer, writer
"In Town"	2012	2 Chainz	Based on a T.R.U. Story	Producer, writer, Artist
"Beneath Your Beautiful"	2012	Labrinth	Electronic Earth	Producer, writer
"That Feeling"	2012	Travis Porter	From Day 1	Writer, Artist
"IDGAF"	2013	Nelly / T.I. / Pharrell Williams	M.O.	Writer
"Say Somethin"	2013	Austin Mahone	Extended Play	Writer
"Just Be Mine"	2014	Cher Lloyd	Sorry I'm Late	Writer
"Sugar"	2014	Maroon 5	V	Writer
"Numb"	2014	Nick Jonas	Nick Jonas	Writer
"Closer"	2014	Nick Jonas	Nick Jonas	Writer, Artist
"I Like Girls"	2015	Rixton	Let the Road	Writer
"Grand"	2022	Kane Brown	Different Man	Writer
"Bad Decisions"	2022	Benny Blanco, BTS, and Snoop Dogg	Non-album single	Writer
