= Lemonade (Adam Friedman song) =

Single by Adam Friedman featuring Mike Posner
- Released: June 3, 2016
- Recorded: 2016
- Genre: Pop
- Length: 2:52
- Label: Gold Rush Record
- Songwriters: Adam Friedman; Mike Posner

Music video
- "Lemonade" on YouTube

"Lemonade" is a song by American singer, songwriter and producer Adam Friedman featuring Mike Posner. Friedman and Posner co-wrote the song. But when it was not included after some consideration in Posner's album At Night, Alone, Friedman decided to put it on his own album also personalizing the song by tweaking certain lyrics. For example, Friedman, who lives on the United States West Coast, changed Carolina in the lyrics to California.

Friedman also released a music video on August 1, 2016 for the song.

Friedman was chosen as Elvis Duran's Artist of the Month and performed the song on NBC's Today show with Kathie Lee and Hoda Kotb where Elvis Duran features the artists chosen for interviews and live performance.
