= Gigamesh =

American music producer and DJ

Matthew Thomas Masurka (born May 12, 1983), better known by his stage name Gigamesh, is a Minneapolis-based American music producer and DJ. Gigamesh is most recognized for having produced Mike Posner's track "Cooler Than Me" as well as for his remix of Foster the People's single "Pumped Up Kicks" (which currently has over 172 million plays on YouTube).

Prior to launching his solo career, Masurka was also involved in two other collaborative projects, Discotech and Señor Stereo, both alongside DJs Danny Daze and Joe Maz. Gigamesh's releases include an EP on Kitsuné and a single and two EPs on OurLabel International. In the spring of 2013, he released the single, "Enjoy", on New York City-based house label Nurvous Records. Touring internationally, he has performed in Asia, Australia, Europe and across North America.

== Discography ==
=== Albums ===
- Time Travel (2016) (Hyperreal)

=== Singles and EPs ===
- "When You're Dancing" featuring Induce (2011), OurLabel Intl
- Gigamesh EP (2011), OurLabel Intl
- Remix EP (2011), OurLabel Intl
- All My Life EP (2012), Kitsuné
- "Enjoy" (2013), Nurvous Records

=== Remixes ===
- amour - "afterparty (Gigamesh Remix)" (2020)
- Rihanna - "Love on the Brain (Gigamesh Remix)" (2016)
- Donna Summer - "Bad Girls (Gigamesh Remix)" (2014)
- Crystal Fighters - "You & I (Gigamesh Remix)" (2013)
- Two Door Cinema Club - "Sun (Gigamesh Remix)" (2012)
- Fleetwood Mac - "Dreams (Gigamesh Edit)" (2012)
- Moullinex - "Take My Pain Away (Gigamesh Remix)" (2012)
- The Penelopes - "Summer Life (Gigamesh Remix)" (2012)
- Theme Park - "Jamaica (Gigamesh Remix)" (2012)
- Ladyhawke - "Sunday Drive (Gigamesh Remix)" (2012)
- Punks Jump Up - "Mr. Overtime (Gigamesh Remix)" (2012)
- James Curd - "Guide Me (Gigamesh Remix)" (2012)
- Grouplove - "Tongue Tied (Gigamesh Remix)" (2012)
- Citizens! - "True Romance (Gigamesh Remix)" (2011)
- Foster the People - "Pumped Up Kicks (Gigamesh Remix)" (2011)
- Katy B - "Lights On (Gigamesh Remix)" (2011)
- Theophilus London - "I Stand Alone (Gigamesh Remix)" (2011)
- Popular Peoples Front - "Party Over Here (Gigamesh Rework)" (2011)
- Win Win - "Victim (Gigamesh Remix)" (2011)
- Deee-Lite - "Groove Is in the Heart (Gigamesh Remix)" (2011)
- White Sea - "Ladykiller (Gigamesh Remix)" (2011)
- Mike Posner - "Cooler Than Me (Gigamesh Final Remix)" (2010)
- Michael Jackson - "Don't Stop 'Til You Get Enough (Gigamesh Remix)" (2010)
- Señor Stereo - "Hot Damn! (Gigamesh Remix)" (2010)
- Stephanie Mills - "Put Your Body in It (Gigamesh Master Mix)" (2010)
- RAC - "If You Forget Me (Gigamesh Remix)" (2010)
- Yo La Tengo - "Nuclear War (Version 2) (Gigamesh Remix)" (2010)
- Marching Band - "Another Day (Gigamesh Remix)" (2010)
- Classixx featuring Jeppe - "I'll Get You (Gigamesh Remix)" (2010)
- Jackson 5 - "Dancing Machine (Gigamesh Remix)" (2010)
- Radiohead - "Everything in Its Right Place (Gigamesh Remix)" (2009)
- Estate - "Write to Make (Gigamesh Remix)" (2009)
- The Velvet Underground - "Rock & Roll (Gigamesh Edit)" (2009)
- Alan Braxe - "Time Machine (With the Spimes) (Gigamesh Remix)" (2013)
- Talking Heads - "Once in a Lifetime (Gigamesh Remix)" (2013)

=== Production ===
- Mike Posner - "Cooler Than Me" (2010)
- Outasight - "Tonight Is the Night" (2011)
