= Jean Marc Belkadi =

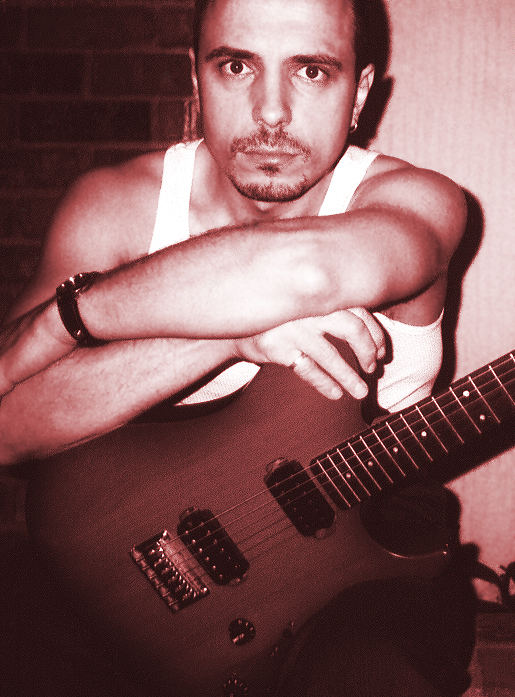

Background information
- Born: Toulouse, France
- Genres: Jazz, jazz fusion, instrumental rock
- Occupations: Musician, composer, author
- Instrument: Guitar
- Years active: 1984–present
- Website: www.jmbelkadi.com

Jean Marc Belkadi is a French-born, American jazz fusion guitarist known for his improvisational soloing technique.

== Career ==
Belkadi studied with Frank Gambale, Scott Henderson, Joe Pass, Joe Diorio, Tal Farlow, and Robben Ford at the Musicians Institute in 1985. The Guitar Institute of Technology class of 1985 had notable alumni such as Jeff Buckley and Paul Gilbert. He taught at the school (GIT) from 1998 to 2007 and at the Los Angeles Music Academy College of Music from 1996 to 2000.

In 2017 Belkadi co-wrote (music) "White Linen" (featuring Cyhi The Prynce) with singer-songwriter Mike Posner, Mat Musto (a.k.a. Blackbear), Cydel Young and Peter Hortaridis. This song was produced by American hip-hop duo Mike Posner and blackbear is from their studio album Mansionz (2017). He plays electric guitar on "Nobody Knows" (Mansionz) composed by Mike Posner, Musto and Soren Bryce. A year later, Belkadi co-wrote (music) "Wide Open" with Mike Posner, Adam Friedman, James Bowen released January 18, 2019. "Wide Open" is track #2 of Mike Posner's third studio album, A Real Good Kid.

Belkadi has recorded the albums Stopover and Toulouse / Los Angeles and written 11 instructional book/CD sets published by Hal Leonard Corporation / Musicians Institute Press. In 2011, he released his first digital E-book with 60 MP3 audio tracks: The Composite Blues Scale for Electric Guitar.

== Personal life ==
Belkadi is married to graphic designer and painter Marie Christine Belkadi. She edited and designed Belkadi's instructional books and CDs.

== Discography ==
- 1998: Stopover - Album
- 1992: The Last Horizon
- 1993: Mr King
- 1997: Stopover
- 1997: Time's Up
- 1997: The Twelve
- 1997: For Some Friends
- 1997: Street Licks
- 2017: Toulouse / Los Angeles - Album
- 2010: Just for the Fun
- 2012: Check Point
- 2012: The Sniper
- 2013: It's Not Difficult
- 2015: Mission Possible
- 2017: Toulouse Groove
- 2017: Party Time

== Instructional book/CD sets ==
- 1997: A Modern Approach to Jazz, Rock & Fusion (Hal Leonard Corporation/Musicians Institute Press)
- 1997: The Diminished Scale for Guitar (Hal Leonard/Musicians Institute)
- 1999: Advanced Scale Concepts & Licks for Guitar (Hal Leonard/Musicians Institute)
- 2000: Jazz–Rock Triad Improvising for Guitar (Hal Leonard/Musicians Institute)
- 2001: Slap & Pop Technique for Guitar (Hal Leonard/Musicians Institute)
- 2002: Outside Guitar Licks (Hal Leonard/Musicians Institute)
- 2003: Progressive Tapping Licks (Hal Leonard/Musicians Institute)
- 2004: Classical Themes for Electric Guitar (Hal Leonard/Musicians Institute)
- 2005: Ethnic Rhythms for Electric Guitar (Hal Leonard/Musicians Institute)
- 2005: Exotic Scales & Licks for Electric Guitar (Hal Leonard/Musicians Institute)
- 2006: Technique Exercises for Guitar (Hal Leonard/Musicians Institute)
- 2011: The Composite Blues Scale for Electric Guitar (Belkadi Publications)
