= Meytal Cohen =

American drummer (born 1983)

Meytal Cohen מיטל כהן
- Born: August 9, 1983 (age 43); Ramat Gan, Israel
- Genres: Hard rock; heavy metal; alternative metal; post-grunge; alternative rock; nu metal
- Occupations: Musician; producer; songwriter
- Instruments: Drums; keyboards; percussion
- Years active: 2007-present
- Label: Light Drop Music
- Website: meytalcohen.com

YouTube information
- Channel: meytalll
- Genre: Music
- Subscribers: 1.63 million
- Views: 368 million
- Last updated: September 14, 2026

Meytal Cohen (Hebrew: מיטל כהן; born August 9, 1983) is an Israeli-American drummer and one of the founding members of the American heavy metal band Meytal. She was born in Ramat Gan, Israel and is the youngest of seven children with four sisters and two brothers. Her online video project, which began in 2010, saw Cohen performing drum covers of popular rock and heavy metal songs, and amassing a huge fan base that has resulted in more than 100 million total views. In August 2015, Meytal's first studio album Alchemy was released. Co-produced by Cohen and Sahaj Ticotin, the album peaked at No.1 on the Billboard Top Heatseekers chart, No.5 on the Hard Rock Albums Chart and No.7 on the Independent Albums chart.

== Early life and education ==
Cohen was born in Ramat Gan, Israel, the seventh child of a large family. Her parents were born in Iraq. She studied tap dance, and graduated with a theater major from Blich High School in Ramat Hen; at the age of 18 she started playing drums and for two years served in the Israel Defense Forces. At the age of 20 she moved to Los Angeles. She studied at Los Angeles Music Academy, majoring in percussion.

== Career ==
After graduation from Los Angeles Music Academy, she played with her band "Metaphor", which also included Tina Guo on cello, Anna Stafford on violin, and Ali Wood on piano, playing concert tours in Australia, the United States, Mexico, South America and Europe in 2007. The all-female Led Zeppelin cover band "Moby Chick" joined their tour in Puerto Rico.

Starting in 2010, Cohen has had an online video project, performing "drum covers" of popular rock songs. This has brought her a fan base and recognition: her 2009 cover of System of a Down's "Toxicity" had approximately 10.9 million views as of 2016; her YouTube drum series had over 60 million views as of 2014. Her number of Facebook followers in 2013 was said to be greater than that of any other Israeli woman with 369,000 likes, outpacing supermodel Bar Refaeli; ahead of President Shimon Peres but behind Prime Minister Benjamin Netanyahu. She was also featured in an American TV show and two Australian shows. She appears playing drums in the video to "Hot-n-Fun" by N.E.R.D..

On 9 July 2013, Cohen started a Kickstarter crowdfunding campaign called "Breaking YouTube" whose purpose was to raise funds to create original music and move beyond covering songs on YouTube. On 10 August 2013, the Kickstarter campaign raised US$144,341 with 3,173 "backers".

In her performances and videos, she uses a DW Performance Series drum kit and Meinl cymbals, and is currently an endorsed artist of both Drum Workshop and Meinl.

== Alchemy ==
Her band's debut album Alchemy was very well received by the critics, with some even calling Alchemy "all of the best elements in a mainstream hard rock band, done better" and reached the #1 position in the Heatseekers chart, as well as #5 in the Hard Rock and #7 in the Independent Artists chart on Billboard in 2015.

== Equipment ==
=== Current kit ===
Cohen uses a drum kit made by DW Drums, with heads by Remo and Meinl cymbals. She uses Vic Firth drumsticks.

== Band members ==
Cohen also plays in a heavy metal band, who support her live shows. The band is commonly referred to as "Meytal", released its first album Alchemy on July 24, 2015, and its members include :

Current members

- Meytal Cohen – drums (2013–present)
- Travis Montgomery – lead guitar (2014–present, also plays in Threat Signal, Jeff Loomis Band and Nociceptor)
- Blake "Anel" Pedrero – bass, backing vocals (2014–present, also plays in Pink Fly)
- Sahaj – lead vocals (2017–present), rhythm guitar (2018–present), lead/rhythm guitar, bass, backing vocals (2013-2014, also plays in Ra)

Former members

- Gil Baram – lead guitar (2013)
- Eric Emery – lead vocals (2013–2017, now sings in Skyharbor)
- Amy Alison Clark – bass (2013)
- Anna Sentina – bass (2014)
- Alex Reyes – rhythm guitar (2014)
- Doc Coyle – rhythm guitar, backing vocals (2014–2018, now plays in Bad Wolves, formerly in God Forbid)

== Discography ==
Studio album

- Alchemy (2015)
- The Witness (2019)

Single

The Witness Album (2019)

- "Dark Side Down" (2014)

Live album

- Alchemy live (2016)
