= Boston's Boy =

EP by Sammy Adams
- Released: March 4, 2010
- Recorded: 2008–2009
- Genre: Hip hop, alternative hip hop, electronica
- Length: 42:45
- Label: 1st Round
- Producer: Sammy Adams, Matty Trump, Jacob Entel, Ski Beatz, Nottz, Austin Woolridge, Anthony "X" Eccleston, Kevin Randolph, Oren Yoel, MP-3, Maestro, Julkeyz, Phunk Dawg

Sammy Adams chronology
Boston's Boy (2010)	Homecoming (2013)

Singles from Boston's Boy
- 1. "Tab Open" Released: November 16, 2009; 2. "Driving Me Crazy" Released: March 4, 2010; 3. "Just Sayin'" Released: August 20, 2010; 4. "Still I Rise" Released: August 31, 2010

Boston's Boy is the debut EP by American rapper Sammy Adams. The EP was released on March 4, 2010, through 1st Round Records.

On July 13, 2010, Adams released four new tracks to make what he called a "deluxe" version of Boston's Boy. These tracks include "Still I Rise", "See Me Now", "Fly Jets Over Boston", and "Just Sayin'". "Still I Rise" features G. Curtis, who recently signed onto Adams' label. "Fly Jets Over Boston" features rapper Curren$y, whom Adams had been working with for a while.

== Controversy ==
Rumors and reports circulated that Adams charged the entirety of his album's first 65,000 purchases to one credit card, which were later proven false with facts that showed all of the purchases were from around the U.S.

== Track listing ==
#	Title	Time	Producer(s)
1	"Comin' Up"	3:44	Jacob Entel (INSTRUM)
2	"Driving Me Crazy"	4:03	Sam Adams, Matty "Trump" Harris
3	"Swang"	3:14	Austin Woolridge
4	"Just Love Here"	4:09	Austin Woolridge, Matty "Trump" Harris
5	"Coast 2 Coast"	3:21	Oren Yoel
6	"You Girl"	3:47	Sam Adams
7	"Tab Open"	3:53	Oren Yoel
8	"I'm So High"	3:13	Matty "Trump" Harris
9	"Still I Rise" (featuring G Curtis)	3:52	Matty "Trump" Harris
10	"See Me Now"	3:29	Austin Woolridge, Matty "Trump" Harris
11	"Fly Jets Over Boston" (featuring Curren$y)	2:44	Xperiment
12	"Just Sayin'"	3:11	MP-3, Phunk Dawg, Anthony "X" Eccleston, Kevin Randolph
13	"Opening Day"	3:47	Sam Adams
14	"Brand New"	2:27	Julkeyz
15	"Better Than You"	3:34	Maestro

== Charts ==
Chart (2013)	Peak position
US Billboard 200	73
