= Homecoming (EP) =

EP by Sammy Adams
- Released: November 19, 2013
- Recorded: 2013
- Genre: Hip hop
- Length: 18:27
- Label: RCA
- Producer: Arthur McArthur, Kevin Figs, Oliver Goldstein, Pops, Sak Pase

Sammy Adams chronology
Boston's Boy (2010)	Homecoming (2013)	The Long Way (2016)

Homecoming is the second EP by Sammy Adams. The EP was released on November 19, 2013, by RCA Records.

== Track listing ==
No.	Title	Producer(s)	Length
1.	"I Wish"		2:53
2.	"Touch"	Arthur McArthur, Pops	3:07
3.	"Kings"	Kevin Figs	3:02
4.	"Awesome"	Sak Pase, Ace Harris	2:35
5.	"Waste"	Arthur McArthur	3:40
6.	"Stop the Music"	Oliver Goldstein	3:10

== Chart positions ==
Chart (2013)	Peak position
US Billboard 200	45
