= Alex Feather Akimov =

Russian–American guitarist and composer (born 1986)

Alex "Feather" Akimov
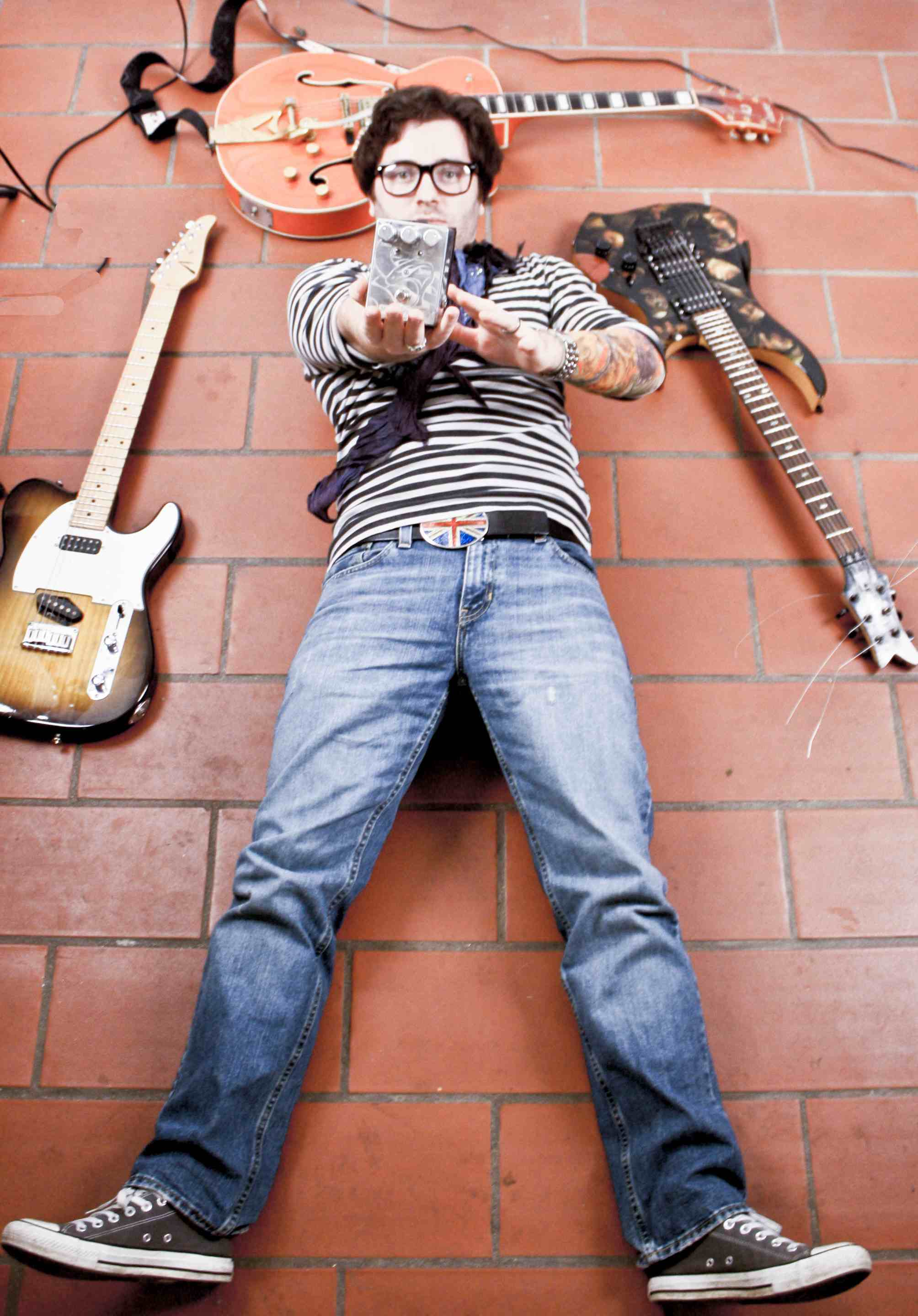

Background information
- Born: Alexey Akimov; May 28, 1986 (age 39)
- Origin: Moscow, Russia
- Genres: Pop, pop rock, jazz fusion, instrumental rock
- Occupation(s): Musician, composer, producer, Manager
- Instrument(s): Electric guitar, guitar synthesizer, keyboard, acoustic guitar
- Years active: 2004–present
- Labels: Bungalo Records, Universal
- Website: Official website

Alex "Feather" Akimov (born May 28, 1986) is a Russian–American guitarist and composer who has worked as a touring musician, a session guitarist and a solo artist. Akimov has appeared on eleven studio albums, has played live, and has collaborated with other artists.

== Education ==
Akimov started playing the guitar when he was 11 years old. In 2006, he graduated from Gnessin State Musical College in Moscow, Russia, with a BA degree in Classical guitar, Jazz guitar and composition. In September 2006, Akimov moved to Los Angeles to study at the Los Angeles Music Academy College of Music (LAMA). After graduating from LAMA in 2008, Akimov started working as a full-time musician.

== Recording, touring and other collaborations ==
In 2008, Akimov was hired to work with Ziv during the band's tour of the United States (US). Akimov appeared on two of Ziv's records, Fearless and Paper & Sound, with the former awarded the "Best Independent Record of the Year" by a music website. Akimov performed more than a hundred shows around the US with Ziv, before ceasing work with the band in 2010. He then started working with a Russian artist, three-time Russian Grammy Award winner, Irene Nelson. Nelson's music video for her debut single, "Sunrise", aired on MTV Russia and Muz-Tv, and eventually placed in the Billboard Dance Charts. In 2011, Akimov toured with the Red Elvises in the US and Russia.

In 2013, Akimov joined Mika Newton project signed to JK Music Group / Friendship Collective label owned by Randy Jackson.

In 2015, he became a manager of a boyband, New District. The band was nominated for the Teen Choice Awards "Choice Next Big Thing" performed shows with Fifth Harmony, Troye Sivan, Ruth B and many others. In 2016, New District won Bravo Otto Award in the category "Superband" The band's first single got a major radio airplay around the U.S. and Canada including Radio Disney and performed at KIIS FM "Next Up"

== Projects ==
2008 – 2009 Ziv – Lead Guitar
2009 – 2010 Irene Nelson – Guitarist, manager
2010 – Eminem FT Rihanna "Love The Way You Lie" Heavy Remix
2010 – Eminem FT Rihanna "Love The Way You Lie" Part 2 – Guitarist 2011 – "Search" Ft Greg Howe
2012 – "Beautiful Lani (featuring Frank Gambale)"
2010 – 2013 Red Elvises Guitar player world tour
2013 "The talented" Sony action cam project
2013 Mika Newton Guitarist/music director
2015 New District Boy Band Manager

== Solo career ==
Akimov appeared as a guitarist in the 2008 film Live Fast, Die Young by Christopher Showerman.

His debut single "All About The Rain" was released in November 2010, produced by Alex Feather Akimov, Brian Duffy, and Brian Garcia. His second single "Search," a collaboration with guitar virtuoso Greg Howe, was released in March 2011. In June 2011, the third single "Troublemaker" and the final video of the trilogy were officially released. The album About the Rain was released on iTunes in July 2011.

The first single "Beautiful Lani (featuring Frank Gambale)" from his album Eatmystrings has been released on iTunes along with an official music video in February 2012.

His second single called "Monsters are Here" was released on iTunes in September 2012
