= Los Angeles College of Music =

Music school in Pasadena, California, United States

Coordinates: 34.140339°N 118.150043°W

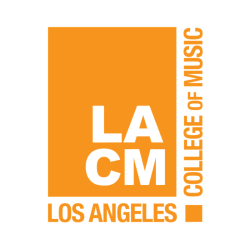
- Type: Private for-profit music college
- Established: 1996
- President: Tom Aylesbury
- Location: Pasadena, California, United States
- Website: lacm.edu

Los Angeles College of Music (LACM, formerly LAMA College for Music Professionals) is a private for-profit music college in Pasadena, in Los Angeles County, California. It has been accredited by the National Association of Schools of Music since 2003. More than 1000 students have graduated from the school, about half of them from outside the United States.

== History ==
LACM was founded in 1996 as LA Music Academy by Hans Peter Becker and co-founded by Tom Aylesbury, who also became president in 2004. Original department Chairs included Frank Gambale (guitar), Dave Carpenter (bass) and co-chairs Joe Porcaro and Ralph Humphrey (drums). The vocal department was established by Kevyn Lettau in 1998. Tierney Sutton took over as chair in 2008. The school changed its name in November 2012 to LAMA College for Music Professionals, and in 2014 to Los Angeles College of Music.

== Accreditation ==
The school has been accredited by the National Association of Schools of Music since 2003. It offers six-quarter Associate of Arts degrees,Bachelor's degrees and Master's Degrees in music performance (drums, guitar, bass or voice) and in music production, music composition and music industry. The associate degrees are classed as "professional" and are not transferable to other colleges or universities.

== Summer courses ==
The school runs one-week summer music courses for children aged 10 or over, with workshops, lessons, clinics and concerts. In partnership with DrumChannel and Guitar Center, it also runs an intensive five-day course for drummers, with clinics, music workshops, instruction, autograph sessions, a musicians' roundtable and a visit to Drum Workshop in Oxnard, CA. Instructors have included Alex Acuña, Peter Erskine, John "JR" Robinson, Terry Bozzio, Efrain Toro and Joe Porcaro.

== Faculty ==
The faculty includes Gordon Goodwin, saxophone, arranging; Wayne Bergeron, trumpet; Tim Landers and Philip Bynoe, bass; Gary Stockdale, Maxayn Lewis, David Joyce, and Teresa James, voice, Andrew Murdock, music production; and Art Alexakis, songwriting.

Past faculty members at the school include Frank Gambale, Jean Marc Belkadi, Gary Hoey and Jerry Donahue, guitar; Sherman Ferguson, John Robinson, Joe Porcaro, Emil Richards, Italo Lamboglia, drums; Dave Carpenter, Alphonso Johnson, Guy Erez and Bunny Brunel, bass; and Kevyn Lettau, Debi Nova, and Tim "Ripper" Owens, vocal.

Master class instructors have included Peter Bernstein, Dean Brown, and Mike Stern, guitar; Patti Austin and Paulette McWilliams, voice; Janek Gwizdala and Alain Caron, bass. Artists in residence at the school have included Abe Laboriel, bass, and Airto Moreira, drums. Many notable musicians have performed clinics at the school.

== Alumni ==
- Jean Dolabella
- Debi Nova
- Tal Wilkenfeld
- Mark Salling
- Alex Feather Akimov
- Joseph E-Shine Mizrachi
- Mayu Wakisaka
- Jesse Krieger
- Meytal Cohen
- Drew Louis
