= L.A. Story (song) =

Single by Sammy Adams featuring Mike Posner
- Released: May 28, 2013
- Recorded: August 2012
- Genre: Pop rap
- Length: 3:28
- Label: RCA Records
- Songwriters: Sammy Adams, Mike Posner, Ryan Tedder, Noel Zancanella
- Producers: Tedder, Zancanella

Sammy Adams singles chronology
"Big Lights" (2013)	"L.A. Story" (2013)	"Remember" (2015)

Mike Posner singles chronology
"Switch Lanes" (2013)	"L.A. Story" (2013)	"I Took a Pill in Ibiza" (2015)

”L.A. Story“ is a song by American rapper Sammy Adams. The song was released on May 28, 2013 through RCA Records. The song features American pop singer Mike Posner. The song was written by Sammy Adams, Mike Posner, Ryan Tedder, Noel Zancanella and Oren Yoel. Tedder and Zancanella also produced the song. Tedder also provides uncredited vocals.

== Music video ==
The official music video, which featured Mike Posner and model Miriam Adler, along with Adams skating through LA in reverse was released on May 14, 2013. The official video dropped July 16, 2013 and was directed by Jon Jon Augustavo.

== Charts ==
Chart (2013)	Peak position
U.S. Billboard Bubbling Under Hot 100	20
US Heatseekers Songs (Billboard)	18
US Pop Digital Songs (Billboard)	25
US Rap Digital Songs (Billboard)	14
