= Operation: Wake Up =

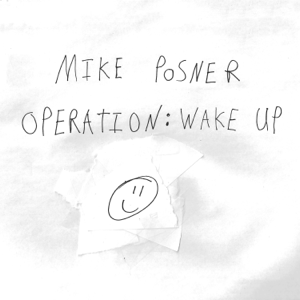

Studio album by Mike Posner
- Released: December 18, 2020
- Genre: Rap opera
- Length: 36:10
- Label: Monster Mountain

Mike Posner chronology
A Real Good Kid (2019)	Operation: Wake Up (2020)

Singles from Operation: Wake Up
- 1. "Weaponry" Released: December 18, 2020

Professional ratings
Review scores
Source	Rating
American Songwriter	3.5/5 stars
Rolling Stone	2.5/5 stars

Operation: Wake Up is the fourth studio album by American singer Mike Posner, released on December 18, 2020. It is a concept album, rapped from the first-person perspective of a fictionalized version of himself. The album features a singular guest appearance from Jessie J.

While his previous three albums all charted to some extent, Operation: Wake Up failed to land on any chart despite receiving positive reviews.

== Recording and release ==
Operation: Wake Up was recorded and written in the basement of Posner's parents' house in Detroit, where he was staying following his father's cancer diagnosis and treatment. His father succumbed to the disease in 2017. The album was released as a surprise album.

== Content ==
Operation: Wake Up shows the mental breakdown experienced by a fictionalized Mike Posner over a 48-hour period, with Posner playing every character. Posner described the album as "a fictional story that blurs the line between reality and performance art." Following the introduction, where Posner insists the album be listened to in a single sitting and encourages those with mental health issues not to listen, the album begins with him staying in a rented mansion in Los Angeles, with the goal of writing songs for "other, more famous artists". He then goes to audition material for Jessie J in the studio, and plays part of an already written song for her, pretending that he just made it up. This is followed by "Weaponry", which features Jessie J. Afterwards he goes to dinner with Blackbear, who throws a party at Posner's rented mansion.

== Track listing ==
Operation: Wake Up track listing
No.	Title	Length
1.	"Introduction"	1:55
2.	"Shave It All Off"	3:59
3.	"Once in a While (Mike Meets Jessie J)"	3:58
4.	"Weaponry" (with Jessie J)	3:12
5.	"Mike Meets Blackbear at Joe's Falafel"	3:58
6.	"Let's Have a Party"	2:39
7.	"Tracy Calls Noelle (Mike's Ex)"	3:39
8.	"Blackbear Throws a Rager in LA"	2:27
9.	"High & Low (On LSD)"	5:43
10.	"Alone in a Mansion"	4:40
Total length:		36:10
