= Michael Wavves =

American rapper and singer

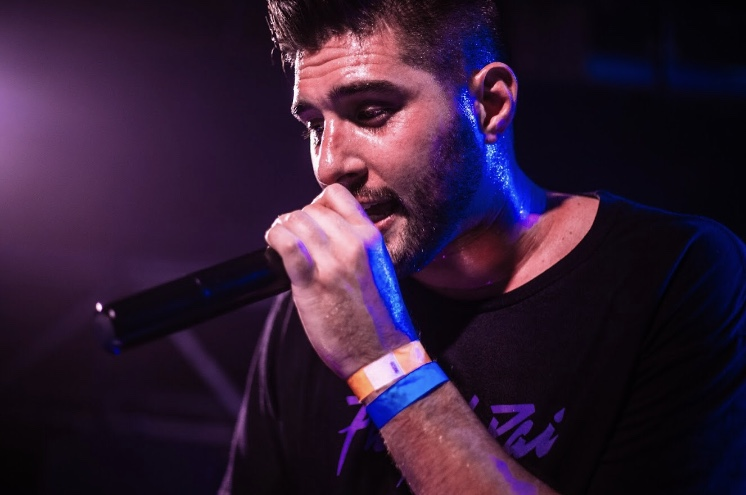
- Bleyer performing in 2020

Background information
- Born: Jordan Michael Bleyer; October 13, 1990 (age 35); Lebanon, Pennsylvania, U.S.
- Genres: Hip hop; pop; R&B
- Occupations: Rapper; singer; songwriter
- Years active: 2012–present
- Label: Michael Wavves Music
- Website: michaelwavves.com

Jordan Michael Bleyer (born October 13, 1990), known professionally as Michael Wavves, is an American rapper, singer, and songwriter from Lebanon, Pennsylvania. He released his first EP, Nights on Vine, in October 2018.

== Career ==
Jordan Michael Bleyer began releasing music in 2015, while working as an eighth grade social studies teacher in Lebanon. In September 2015, he released his first song, "No Pressure." In early 2016, he released the song "Bad" featuring American rapper Sammy Adams. He began 2018 by releasing the song "Ride Out" featuring artists Lilo Key & Danny Asroff. In July 2018, he released the song "On The Low..." featuring rapper Trizzy. Following the release of "On The Low..." he released his first EP, Nights on Vine, in October 2018. For his first release in 2019, he teamed up with artist Kevin Flum and released the song "On Me".

In the summer of 2019, Wavves was interviewed by Respect magazine on the release of his latest EP, Purple Heart. Purple Heart received local media attention by debuting at No. 12 on the iTunes R&B charts. Shortly after the EP's release, he gained local attention by performing the song "Undrwtr" live on news station Good Day PA in Harrisburg, Pennsylvania. In 2020, Wavves released several collaborative singles, including collaborations with international electronic producers Hoober and Noixes.

== Discography ==
=== Albums and EPs ===
List of albums & EPs, with selected details
Title	Details
Nights on Vine EP	Released: October 12, 2018; Label: Self-released; Formats: Digital download
Purple Heart EP	Released: June 15, 2019; Label: Self-Released; Formats: Digital download

=== Singles ===
List of singles, showing year released and album name
Title	Year	Album
"Ride Out feat. Lilo Key & Danny Asroff"	2018	Non-album single
"I Know feat. Dylan Reese"	2018	Non-album single
"On The Low feat. Trizzy"	2018	Non-album single
"Over Everything feat. John Wolf"	2018	Non-album single
"SOS feat. Abstract & Ivan B"	2019	Non-album single
"Magic (feat. Jerome The Prince)"	2020	Non-album single
"Come Back to Me (feat. Jerome The Prince)"	2020	Non-album single
"Excuse Me (feat. J-Wright)"	2020	Non-album single
"All Black (with Noixes)"	2020	Non-album single
"Shepherd's Will (with Heuse)"	2020	Non-album single
"Runaway (with Hoober)"	2020	Non-album single
"Bad (with Hoober & Sammy Adams)"	2020	Non-album single
"Patrick Mahomes (with Level 8)"	2020	Non-album single
"Fun With It (with Noixes & RVPTR")	2021	Non-album single
"What She Told Me (with Onur Ormen & Reaktive)"	2021	Non-album single
