= Sammy Adams =

American rapper, singer and songwriter

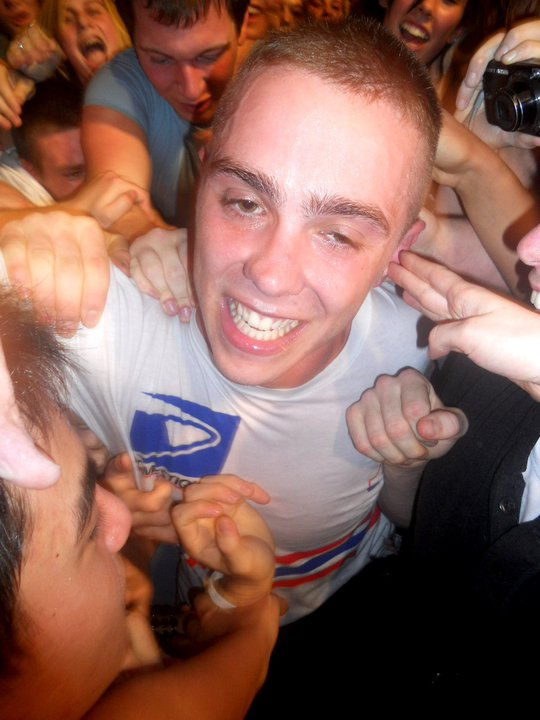
- Adams in 2010

Background information
- Also known as: Initial; Wiz; Wizzy; Boston's Boy; Sam Adams
- Born: Samuel Adams Wisner; August 14, 1987 (age 39); Cambridge, Massachusetts, U.S.
- Genres: Hip hop; electronic; dance
- Occupations: Rapper; singer; songwriter
- Years active: 2005–present
- Labels: 1st Round; RCA
- Website: www.sammyadamsmusic.com

Samuel Adams Wisner (born August 14, 1987) is an American rapper, singer and songwriter. A descendant of U.S. President John Quincy Adams, he rose to prominence in 2010 with his debut EP Boston's Boy, which reached #1 on the iTunes hip-hop chart and #73 on the Billboard 200. He signed with RCA Records in 2011 and released singles including "Only One" and "L.A. Story" before returning to independent releases. His debut studio album, The Long Way, was released in 2016.

== Early life ==
Sammy Adams was born on August 14, 1987, in Cambridge, Massachusetts, to Kata Hull, a painting instructor at the School of the Museum of Fine Arts, and Chuck Wisner, a leadership consultant. His mother is named for her ancestor Louisa Catherine Adams, the wife of President John Quincy Adams, and the family regularly attended the Adams family reunion in Quincy. He and his family moved to Wayland, Massachusetts, when he was in high school. Adams attended several schools, including Cambridge Rindge and Latin School, Proctor Academy, and Beaver Country Day School, before finishing at Wayland High School during his junior and senior years. He went on to attend Hobart College, where he played varsity soccer, before transferring to Trinity College in Hartford, Connecticut, where he majored in political science.

Adams has been involved in music since his childhood; he played piano from the age of 7 and began improvising his own beats and melodies at age 11. He became a fan of rap music in the eighth grade. Adams has stated in interviews that his musical influences have come not only from other rappers, but also from classic rock, classical music, and blues. He began writing raps throughout middle and high school, and started recording songs on his MacBook in 2008 in the dorms of Trinity College.

== Musical career ==
=== 2010: Boston's Boy ===
In September 2009, Adams released "I Hate College (Remix)," a response to rapper Asher Roth's song "I Love College," on YouTube. The video has over 10 million views as of September 2015. He also released "Kimber," "Poker Face Remix," "Hard s***," "Opening Day," and "Rollin," which have combined for over 2 million views as of September 2012. His debut EP, Boston's Boy, topped iTunes' hip-hop charts, driven by the success of "Driving Me Crazy". Boston's Boy was released on March 4, 2010, by 1st Round Records and reached #73 on the Billboard 200 and #1 on iTunes. Adams credited his loyal college fan base for the success of the EP. On July 13, 2010, four extra tracks were released to create a deluxe version of Boston's Boy: "Still I Rise," "See Me Now," "Fly Jets Over Boston," and "Just Sayin'." Two of the songs featured special guests: G. Curtis on "Still I Rise" and Curren$y on "Fly Jets Over Boston".

Adams finished his second mixtape, Party Records Mixtape, in London and released it in September 2010. In the same month, Adams was arrested during a show at Kansas State University. After having his noise permit revoked, Adams yelled "Fuck the police!" and was subsequently handcuffed onstage as he tried to perform "Driving Me Crazy".

=== 2011–2014: Signing with RCA and debut EP ===
He performed at the music festival Lollapalooza in Chicago in August 2011. In late 2011, Adams signed with RCA Records of Sony.

Adams released the promotional singles "Blow Up" and "Summertime" in November 2011 and March 2012, respectively. He made his television debut on the late-night talk show Conan with Conan O'Brien in January 2012, performing "Blow Up". A third single, "Only One", was released in April 2012 and became Adams' first track to receive mainstream radio attention. Teen Vogue named Adams one of five new "Artists To Watch" in 2012, and Artist Direct gave the single 4 out of 5 stars. "Only One" was included in AT&T's 2012 Summer Olympics commercial featuring footballer Alex Morgan.

On August 1, 2012, EW reported that Adams was set to appear as himself on CW's hit teen drama 90210. Adams released a new single, "All Night Longer", for digital download on August 21, 2012. In October 2012, he played himself in a German reality show called Berlin Tag und Nacht. In Fall 2012, Adams went on his "All Night Longer" tour. In November 2012, he joined the remix of American singer-songwriter Taylor Swift's song "I Knew You Were Trouble".

During a charity concert in New Jersey on March 23, 2013, Adams fell ill during his performance and was taken to an ambulance for treatment by paramedics. During April 2013 he went on tour with California rapper T. Mills. On May 10, 2013, Adams released the single "L.A. Story" featuring American singer Mike Posner, produced by OneRepublic frontman Ryan Tedder. The song was released to iTunes on May 28 and to Mainstream Top 40 radio on June 4, 2013. On September 18, 2013, Adams announced on Twitter that his debut album, Homecoming, was to be released in October. He later announced that Homecoming would be released on November 19, 2013, as a digital-only EP.

=== 2015–2016: 1st Round and debut LP ===
In 2015, Adams parted with RCA Records after three years on the label. He announced via Twitter that he would be releasing an album as an independent artist, and soon after rejoined his former independent label, 1st Round Records.

On December 3, 2015, Adams released the lead single "Remember" from his debut studio album The Long Way, which was released through 1st Round Records on March 24, 2016.

=== 2017–present: Independent ===
After the promotional cycle for The Long Way ended, Adams left 1st Round Records. In August 2017, Adams released his tropical house single "Shining".

On July 29, 2017, Adams headlined the inaugural Briggs Fest in Boston.

On November 10, 2017, he released the single "Driving" with Telykast and Basko.

== Personal life ==
Wisner played varsity soccer at Hobart College, where he scored 6 goals and had 4 assists. He then transferred to Trinity College, where he was named soccer captain during his senior year. While playing for Trinity, Wisner tallied 11 goals and 11 assists, leading the team in points in 2008 and starting all 16 games for the Bantams. He was selected to the All-NESCAC First Team at forward in 2008. He is a fan of English club Arsenal.

== Discography ==
=== Studio albums ===
List of studio albums, with selected chart positions
Title	Album details	Peak chart positions
Title	Album details	US Rap
The Long Way	Released: March 24, 2016; Label: 1st Round; Format: CD, digital download	17

=== EPs ===
List of extended plays, with selected chart positions
Title	EP details	Peak chart positions		
Title	EP details	US	US R&B	US Rap
Boston's Boy	Released: March 4, 2010; Label: 1st Round; Format: CD, digital download	73	21	7
Homecoming	Released: November 19, 2013; Label: RCA, 1st Round; Format: Digital download	45	—	5

=== Singles ===
==== As lead artist ====
List of singles by title, year and peak chart positions, and album
Title	Year	Peak chart positions			Certifications	Album
Title	Year	US	US Heat	US Pop	Certifications	Album
"Driving Me Crazy"	2010	90	6	—		Boston's Boy
"Blow Up"	2011	—	—	—		Non-album singles
"Only One"	2012	—	—	33		Non-album singles
"All Night Longer"	2012	—	—	—	RIAA: Platinum	Non-album singles
"Big Lights"	2013	—	—	—		Non-album singles
"L.A. Story" (featuring Mike Posner)	2013	120	18	—		Non-album singles
"Remember"	2015	—	—	—		The Long Way
"Helluva"	2016	—	—	—		The Long Way
"Shining"	2017	—	—	—		Non-album single
"—" denotes releases that did not chart.

==== As featured artist ====
List of singles as featured artist, with selected chart positions, showing year released and album name
Title	Year	Peak chart positions						Album
Title	Year	US	AUS	CAN	ICE	SLO	SPA	Album
"Hiroshima" (Supraliminal featuring Sammy Adams as "Initial")	2005	—	—	—	—	—	—	Methods of Expression Vol.2
"In the Zone" (Supraliminal featuring Sammy Adams)	2008	—	—	—	—	—	—	Vol 3: Most Likely to Be Famous
"No...Yeah" (Michael Africk featuring Sammy Adams)	2010	—	—	—	—	—	—	Non-album single
"Fly So High" (G. Curtis featuring Sammy Adams)	2011	—	—	—	—	—	—	Maximum Volume
"Gamechangerz" (G. Curtis featuring Sammy Adams)	2011	—	—	—	—	—	—	Maximum Volume
"I'm Ragin" (Bei Maejor featuring Sammy Adams)	2011	—	—	—	—	—	—	Maejor Maejor
"Finally Found You" (Enrique Iglesias featuring Sammy Adams)	2012	24	33	11	28	10	31	Sex and Love
"I Knew You Were Trouble" (Remix) (Taylor Swift featuring Sammy Adams)	2012	—	—	—	—	—	—	Non-album singles
"Boston vs. Everybody" (Statik Selektah featuring Various Artists)	2014	—	—	—	—	—	—	Non-album singles
"Wide Awake" (Cam Meekins featuring Sammy Adams)	2015	—	—	—	—	—	—	Stories from the Green Line
"Mine for the Night" (Zak Downtown featuring Sammy Adams)	2015	—	—	—	—	—	—	Winning Means Everything
"Bad" (Michael Wavves featuring Sammy Adams)	2016	—	—	—	—	—	—	Non-album singles
"Mix It Up" (Hi-Rex featuring Sammy Adams)	2016	—	—	—	—	—	—	Non-album singles
"Hangover (Remix)" (Huey Mack featuring Sammy Adams and James Kaye)	2016	—	—	—	—	—	—	The Longest Year of My Life
"Bananas" (Rapta featuring Sammy Adams)	2017	—	—	—	—	—	—	Leo
"—" denotes a recording that did not chart or was not released in that territory.
