= Weaponry (song) =

2020 song by Mike Posner featuring Jessie J

Single by Mike Posner and Jessie J

from the album Operation: Wake Up
- Released: December 18, 2020
- Genre: Pop
- Length: 3:12
- Label: Island
- Songwriter(s): Tom Barnes; Pete Kelleher; Ben Kohn; Mike Posner; Steve Aoki
- Producer(s): MdL; Mike Posner; TMS

Mike Posner singles chronology
"Live Before I Die" (2019)	"Weaponry" (2020)	"Momma Always Told Me" (2021)

Jessie J singles chronology
"One More Try" (2019)	"Weaponry" (2020)	"I Want Love" (2021)

Music video
- "Weaponry" on YouTube

"Weaponry" is a song by American singer Mike Posner, featuring additional vocals by British singer Jessie J. The song interpolates Mike's previously released song with DJ Steve Aoki, "A Lover and a Memory", which appeared on Aoki’s album Neon Future III (2018).

The song was released by Island Records on December 18, 2020, as the lead single from Posner's fourth solo studio album, Operation: Wake Up (2020).

== Writing ==
"Weaponry" is a reworking of the song "A Lover and a Memory", from Steve Aoki's 2018 album Neon Future III.

== Content ==
Mike Wass, writing for Idolator, described the song as a "deeply emotional mid-tempo ballad."

Within the context of Operation: Wake Up, the song is proceeded by "Once In A While (Mike Meets Jessie J)."

== Music video ==
The music video was released on YouTube on December 18, 2020, and directed by Eric Maldin. The video shows that a woman played by American actress Stephanie Pearson tearfully stares at Posner painfully shaving his own hair with a hair trimmer in a white-painted room, cutting himself several times in the process. As of June 2022, the video has been viewed over 1,000,000 times.

== Charts ==
Chart performance for "Weaponry"
Chart (2020)	Peak position
New Zealand Hot Singles (RMNZ)	39
