= Driving Me Crazy =

2010 single by Sammy Adams

Single by Sammy Adams

from the EP Boston's Boy
- Released: March 4, 2010
- Length: 4:03
- Label: 1st Round
- Songwriter(s): Samuel Wisner; Matty Harris
- Producer(s): Adams; Matty Trump

Sammy Adams singles chronology
"Tab Open" (2009)	"Driving Me Crazy" (2010)	"Blow Up" (2011)

Music video
- "Driving Me Crazy" on YouTube

"Driving Me Crazy" is a song by American rapper Sammy Adams, released on March 4, 2010, as the second single from his debut EP Boston's Boy . The song was produced by Adams and Matty Trump and features a sample of "Walking on Broken Glass" by Annie Lennox. The song became Adams' first hit, helping him rise to prominence.

== Background and composition ==
The production of the song is built on a synthesizer vamp from "Walking on Broken Glass". With respect to the sampled song, Sammy Adams stated, "It's interesting because that song doesn't really go hand-in-hand with rap, but it does play into the delivery, where you don't have to rap about negative things or hardships that you have in your life. It's all about feel-good stuff that college kids want to think about." In the lyrics, Adams raps about becoming infatuated with women, especially in pursuit of sex.

== Critical reception ==
Jacob Lewis of HotNewHipHop gave a favorable review, commenting "Sammy Adams's rap artistry continues to improve with every release, something which is most definitely evidenced on Driving Me Crazy."

== Charts ==
Chart (2010)	Peak position
US Billboard Hot 100	90
US Heatseekers Songs (Billboard)	6
