= Cooler than Me =

2010 single by Mike Posner

- Single Mix cover

Single by Mike Posner

from the album 31 Minutes to Takeoff and A Matter of Time
- Released: April 16, 2010
- Recorded: 2009
- Genre: Electropop
- Length: 3:33
- Label: J; RCA
- Songwriters: Mike Posner; Eric Hölljes; Sean Anderson; Jeffrey Oh
- Producer: Gigamesh

Mike Posner singles chronology
"Cooler than Me" (2010)	"Please Don't Go" (2010)

Music video
- "Cooler than Me" by Mike Posner on YouTube

"Cooler than Me" is the debut single by American singer Mike Posner. It was released on April 16, 2010, as the lead single from his debut studio album 31 Minutes to Takeoff (2010). It reached number six on the Billboard Hot 100 and peaked on Billboard's Hot Dance Airplay chart on July 31, 2010. The song was produced and engineered by Gigamesh.

Two demo versions of the song exist: An acoustic pop version which features rapper and fellow Detroit native Big Sean, and a remix version parenthetically labeled "Gigamesh Remix". The former appears on the A Matter of Time mixtape. The latter first appeared on Posner's October 2009 mixtape One Foot Out the Door; its production is largely identical to the final song, although this version's structural arrangement is different, lacking any verses.

== Background ==
Speaking in August 2010 to noted British urban writer Pete Lewis – Assistant Editor of Blues & Soul – Posner described the background to the song: "A lotta people don't know I recorded that song while I was still a student, and that I recorded it in my dorm-room on an extremely cheap microphone! So to now be hearing it on the radio in the States and over here is very special for me, knowing that I made it in such a makeshift manner. And while yes, it is about a specific girl in my class I had a crush on – though I'm not gonna tell you her name, because she doesn't deserve any notoriety – it's also about a specific type of girl. Because there are girls like that everywhere! You know, everybody knows that girl who thinks she's cooler than them, which is why I figured I'd just try to capture that moment of feeling snubbed. Because all my songs are either driven by something that's happened to me, or by something I've felt on the inside."

== Music video ==
In the music video, Posner starts out at a concert singing some of his songs before an enthusiastic audience. After the show he goes driving with his friends, who then drop him off at the Roosevelt Hotel on Los Angeles' Hollywood Blvd. After a short elevator ride, Posner enters a hotel suite, where he finds a party in freeze frame. As soon as Posner dons a pair of sunglasses, the party comes to life.

Throughout the course of the video, Posner tries on different styles of sunglasses including Oakley Razorblades, Holbrooks, Jupiters, Frogskins, and 3D glasses. While he is trying each pair on, it evokes a different perception of the party currently going on in the hotel room. In the end, he is seen leaving the hotel that morning with his old sunglasses back on.

The video, directed by Jason Beattie, features cameos by Louie Vito, Christopher Pfaff, and others.

The music video premiered in early April 2010 and uploaded on May 26, 2010, on Vevo online. It premiered on television in the UK on September 28, 2010.

== Media usage ==
On May 18, 2010, Electronic Arts announced that "Cooler than Me" would be featured in the Sims 3: Ambitions video game. The song was translated into "Simlish", the language of the Sims.

Posner appeared on TBS's Lopez Tonight on May 31, 2010, with a performance of "Cooler than Me" (Gigamesh Remix), as well as America's Got Talent on July 28, 2010. Posner also performed the song on The Ellen DeGeneres Show premiere week in its eighth season.

The song was used to promote a season of Beauty and the Geek Australia, which aired on the Seven Network in Australia throughout 2010.

The song was used as transition music during episodes of the American radio show Loveline that were broadcast in 2010.

On October 2, 2010, the song was performed by Cher Lloyd on the seventh series of the British TV talent competition The X Factor, during the judges' houses stage of the competition, but she was unable to finish the song in front of Cheryl Cole and will.i.am due to a case of tonsillitis. In spite of this, she made it through to the live shows.

On October 16, 2010, the song was covered at the end of an episode of the British TV comedy Harry Hill's TV Burp, by a man and his wife who had appeared on a parodic video on the show earlier in the evening.

For Body Pump 76, "Cooler than Me" has been used for Abs track. On December 8, 2010, the a cappella group Groove for Thought covered the song on the second episode of second season of The Sing-Off.

It was also covered in the 2011 season of the Australian version of The X Factor by boy band Young Men Society, who made it to the top eight before being eliminated.

The song is featured on the remastered edition of Grand Theft Auto V for PlayStation 4, PC and Xbox One versions released on November 18, 2014. It can be heard on Non-Stop-Pop FM.

Posner's later hit "I Took a Pill in Ibiza" references "Cooler than Me" as a "pop song people forgot".

== Charts ==
=== Weekly charts ===
Chart (2010–2011)	Peak position
Australia (ARIA)	4
Austria (Ö3 Austria Top 40)	10
Belgium (Ultratop 50 Flanders)	9
Belgium (Ultratip Bubbling Under Flanders)	1
Belgium (Ultratop 50 Wallonia)	7
Belgium (Ultratip Bubbling Under Wallonia)	4
Canada Hot 100 (Billboard)	5
Czech Republic Airplay (ČNS IFPI)	30
Denmark (Tracklisten)	22
Europe (European Hot 100 Singles)	13
France (SNEP)	13
Germany (GfK)	22
Hungary (Rádiós Top 40)	6
Ireland (IRMA)	4
Italy (FIMI)	50
Netherlands (Dutch Top 40)	23
Netherlands (Single Top 100)	29
New Zealand (Recorded Music NZ)	3
Norway (VG-lista)	8
Poland (Dance Top 50)	48
Poland (Polish Airplay New)	2
Scotland Singles (Official Charts)	6
Slovakia Airplay (ČNS IFPI)	14
Spain (Promusicae)	48
Sweden (Sverigetopplistan)	30
Switzerland (Schweizer Hitparade)	21
UK Singles (Official Charts)	5
US Billboard Hot 100	6
US Adult Contemporary (Billboard)	23
US Adult Pop Airplay (Billboard)	6
US Pop Airplay (Billboard)	3
US Rhythmic Airplay (Billboard)	8

=== Year-end charts ===
Chart (2010)	Position
Australia (ARIA)	21
Austria (Ö3 Austria Top 40)	67
Belgium (Ultratop Flanders)	44
Belgium (Ultratop Wallonia)	98
Canada (Canadian Hot 100)	36
Germany (Official German Charts)	93
Hungary (Rádiós Top 40)	88
New Zealand (Recorded Music NZ)	29
Sweden (Sverigetopplistan)	83
UK Singles (Official Charts Company)	33
US Billboard Hot 100	19
US Adult Top 40 (Billboard)	30
US Mainstream Top 40 (Billboard)	10
US Rhythmic (Billboard)	34

Chart (2011)	Position
France (SNEP)	80
Hungary (Rádiós Top 40)	7
UK Singles (Official Charts Company)	160

== Certifications ==
Region	Certification	Certified units/sales
Australia (ARIA)	3× Platinum	210,000^{^}
Canada (Music Canada)	Platinum	80,000^{*}
Denmark (IFPI Danmark)	Platinum	90,000^{‡}
Germany (BVMI)	Platinum	300,000^{‡}
New Zealand (RMNZ) featuring Big Sean	5× Platinum	150,000^{‡}
Sweden (GLF)	Gold	20,000^{‡}
United Kingdom (BPI)	3× Platinum	1,800,000
United States (RIAA)	6× Platinum	6,000,000^{‡}
^{*} Sales figures based on certification alone.^{^} Shipments figures based on certification alone.^{‡} Sales+streaming figures based on certification alone.

== Release history ==
Region	Format	Date	Label
United States	Digital download	April 16, 2010	J
France	Digital download	April 16, 2010	J
Germany	CD single	August 27, 2010	J
United Kingdom	Digital download	November 8, 2010	RCA

== See also ==
- List of U.S. number-one dance airplay hits of 2010
