= A Matter of Time (mixtape) =

Mixtape by Mike Posner
- Released: February 28, 2009
- Genre: Pop; hip hop; R&B
- Length: 36:25

Mike Posner chronology
A Matter of Time (2009)	One Foot Out the Door (2009)

A Matter of Time is the debut mixtape by American singer-songwriter Mike Posner. It was released on February 28, 2009.

== Background ==
The mixtape was released before Posner was signed to J Records (RCA/Sony). The mixtape features the Brain Trust which includes underground rappers Big Sean, Donnis, Jackie Chain, and singer Eric Holljes. DJ Benzi mixed the mixtape, Don Cannon hosted and shouted out on the mixtape, and Posner did most of all his recordings and writing in his dorm room. His hit single "Cooler Than Me" was debuted on the mixtape before it was released as his first single from his debut studio album, 31 Minutes to Takeoff.

== Style ==
The mixtape has an eclectic range of genres. It combines synthpop, pop, R&B, and hip-hop. The mixtape contains a few covers such as Beyoncé's "Halo" and the rest are original tracks.

== Notable songs ==
"Cooler Than Me" was originally released from the mixtape before being released as the first single from 31 Minutes to Takeoff. "Smoke & Drive" featuring Big Sean, Donnis, and Jackie Chain was another single from the mixtape. This is an extended version off of Big Sean's mixtape "Finally Famous." "Drug Dealer Girl" is one of the most culturally popular songs from the mixtape. The music video for the song featured Dominican model Rosa Acosta and was shot on the Duke University campus where Posner attended.

== Track listing ==
Track listing
No.	Title	Producer(s)	Length
1.	"Tick" (featuring Don Cannon)	Mike Posner	1:18
2.	"Drug Dealer Girl"	Mike Posner, Wrightrax	3:57
3.	"Cooler Than Me" (featuring Big Sean)	Mike Posner	3:47
4.	"Hey Cupid"	Mike Posner	3:52
5.	"Still Not Over You" (featuring Eric Holljes)	Mike Posner, Eric Holljes	3:16
6.	"Evil Woman"	Mike Posner	3:01
7.	"Who Knows?" (featuring Big Sean)	Mike Posner	3:12
8.	"Halo"	Beyoncé Knowles, Ryan Tedder, E. Kidd Bogart, Mike Posner	3:00
9.	"Smoke & Drive" (featuring Big Sean, Donnis, and Jackie Chain)	Mike Posner	3:23
10.	"Losing My Mind"	Drumma Boy	2:48
11.	"A Matter of Time"	Mike Posner	3:38
12.	"Tock" (featuring Don Cannon)	Mike Posner	1:12

== Chart success ==
"A Matter of Time" was in the top number one position of the iTunesU, which is for free lectures by professors.
