= Bow Chicka Wow Wow =

Single by Mike Posner featuring Lil Wayne

from the album 31 Minutes to Takeoff
- Released: February 3, 2011
- Recorded: 2010
- Studio: Downtown, Lotzan Matzan Studios (New York City, New York)
- Genre: R&B
- Length: 3:15 (Album version); 3:43 (Remix feat. Lil Wayne)
- Label: J
- Songwriters: Mike Posner; Bruno Mars; Philip Lawrence; Ari Levine; Christopher Brody Brown
- Producers: The Smeezingtons; Cisse Methods

Mike Posner singles chronology
"Please Don't Go" (2010)	"Bow Chicka Wow Wow" (2011)	"With Ur Love" (2011)

Lil Wayne singles chronology
"Hit the Lights" (2011)	"Bow Chicka Wow Wow" (2011)	"John" (2011)

"Bow Chicka Wow Wow" is a song by American recording artist Mike Posner from his debut album 31 Minutes to Takeoff (2010). The song was co-written by Posner, and produced by Cisse Methods and production teams The Smeezingtons, composed of Bruno Mars, Philip Lawrence and Ari Levine.

A remix of the song, featuring a verse by American rapper Lil Wayne, was released as the album's third single on February 3, 2011. Wayne appeared in the music video of the song as well.

Posner performed the single on The Ellen DeGeneres Show on April 19, 2011.

The song's video is listed in the showcase library of National Geographic Music India.

== Music video ==
Posner posted the music video on Vevo on February 24, 2011. It features Lil Wayne. It takes place where Mike Posner is dating a girl, but fails to impress her. When all else fails to work, he plays "Bow Chicka Wow Wow", and the girl becomes attracted and "turned on" to him. When Lil Wayne undergoes the same problem in the room next to Posner, he plays the song loud enough for both their girls to hear it. The girl in the black dress at the restaurant is Lyla Dee.

== Chart performance ==
Chart (2011)	Peak position
Australia (ARIA)	40
New Zealand (Recorded Music NZ)	21
UK Singles (Official Charts Company)	175
UK Dance (OCC)	28
US Billboard Hot 100	30
US Pop Airplay (Billboard)	21

== Certifications ==
Region	Certification	Certified units/sales
United States (RIAA)	Platinum	1,000,000^{‡}
^{‡} Sales+streaming figures based on certification alone.

== Release history ==
Country	Date	Format
United States	February 3, 2011	Digital download
United States	February 8, 2011	CHR/Top 40 radio
United Kingdom	April 10, 2011	CD single, digital download
