= Please Don't Go (Mike Posner song) =

2010 single by Mike Posner

Single by Mike Posner

from the album 31 Minutes to Takeoff
- Released: June 9, 2010
- Recorded: 2009–2010
- Studio: Downtown, Lotzan Matzan Studios (New York City)
- Genre: Electropop; hip-hop; trance
- Length: 3:17
- Label: J
- Songwriters: Benny Blanco; Mike Posner
- Producers: Benny Blanco; Mike Posner

Mike Posner singles chronology
"Cooler than Me" (2010)	"Please Don't Go" (2010)	"Bow Chicka Wow Wow" (2011)

"Please Don't Go" is a song by American singer-songwriter Mike Posner, released as the second single from his debut album 31 Minutes to Takeoff (2010). Posner co-wrote and co-produced the song with Benny Blanco. J Records released the single to contemporary hit radio in the United States on June 9, 2010. The song peaked at number 16 on the Billboard Hot 100, giving Posner his second top 40 hit on that chart. It also peaked at numbers 9, 18, and 30, on the Mainstream Top 40, Rhythmic, and Adult Top 40 charts, respectively. It managed to peak within the top 40 in countries like Austria, Canada, Germany and New Zealand. A remix of the song features American rapper Waka Flocka Flame.

== Composition and lyrics ==
"Please Don't Go" is an uptempo electropop, hip-hop and trance song, with elements of R&B. Posner co-wrote and produced the song alongside Benny Blanco. Posner's lyrics plead for his girlfriend not to leave him. Blanco provides background vocals in the chorus. The song was mixed by Serban Ghenea and engineered by John Hanes and Tim Roberts.

== Commercial performance ==
In the United States, the song debuted at number 94 on the Billboard Hot 100 and reached number 16. It also reached number 9 on the Billboard Pop Songs chart. As of January 2011, 1,000,000 copies had been purchased. It also charted on the New Zealand charts and on the Canadian charts. It peaked at number 23 in Canada and reached number 19 in New Zealand, making it his second top 20 single of that country along with "Cooler Than Me". In the UK, the song charted poorly.

In 2021, the song experienced a resurgence on TikTok where users would wear a scarf and glasses and drive in a car. This got the attention of Posner himself who would repost the videos on to his official page.‘Please Don't Go' Driving With Headscarf TikTok Trend

== Credits and personnel ==
Credits adapted from the liner notes of 31 Minutes to Takeoff.

- Mike Posner – vocals, songwriting, production, drums, keyboards and programming
- Benny Blanco – background vocals, songwriting, production, drums, keyboards, programming, vocal editing and engineering
- Rob Murray – vocal editing assistant
- Serban Ghenea – audio mixing
- John Hanes – engineering
- Tim Roberts – engineering assistant

== Charts ==
=== Weekly charts ===
Chart (2010–2011)	Peak position
Australia (ARIA)	51
Austria (Ö3 Austria Top 40)	27
Belgium (Ultratip Bubbling Under Flanders)	13
Belgium (Ultratip Bubbling Under Wallonia)	12
Canada Hot 100 (Billboard)	23
German Singles Chart	40
Hungary (Rádiós Top 40)	40
New Zealand (Recorded Music NZ)	19
UK Singles (Official Charts Company)	194
US Billboard Hot 100	16
US Adult Pop Airplay (Billboard)	30
US Pop Airplay (Billboard)	9
US Rhythmic Airplay (Billboard)	18

=== Year-end charts ===
Chart (2011)	Position
US Billboard Hot 100	91

== Certifications ==
Region	Certification	Certified units/sales
Australia (ARIA)	Gold	35,000^{^}
Canada (Music Canada)	Gold	40,000^{*}
New Zealand (RMNZ)	Platinum	30,000^{‡}
United States (RIAA)	3× Platinum	3,000,000^{‡}
^{*} Sales figures based on certification alone.^{^} Shipments figures based on certification alone.^{‡} Sales+streaming figures based on certification alone.

== Release history ==
Country	Date	Format
United States	June 9, 2010	Contemporary hit radio; Rhythmic radio
