= I Took a Pill in Ibiza =

Single by Mike Posner

from the EP The Truth and from the album At Night, Alone
- Released: June 8, 2015 (original version); September 18, 2015 (SeeB remix)
- Recorded: 2014–2015
- Genre: Folk pop; tropical house (Note: SeeB remix only)
- Length: 4:40 (original version); 3:19 (SeeB remix)
- Label: Island
- Songwriter: Mike Posner
- Producers: Mike Posner; SeeB; Martin Terefe

Mike Posner singles chronology
"L.A. Story" (2011)	"I Took a Pill in Ibiza" (2015)	"Looks Like Sex" (2016)
- Be as You Are

"I Took a Pill in Ibiza" (Note: In the censored versions, it is also known as "In Ibiza" or its clean title "I Took a Plane to Ibiza") is a song by American singer Mike Posner. The song was originally acoustic guitar-based and released digitally as a single in the United States in April 2015 before being remixed a few months later by Norwegian production duo Seeb. The original version is on Posner's second EP The Truth, while both versions are on his second studio album At Night, Alone. The title references the Spanish island of Ibiza, while the pill was a "mystery" drug according to Posner; he later confirmed it was ecstasy.

The SeeB remix of the song peaked within the top ten of the charts in twenty-seven countries, including number one in Belgium, Israel, Netherlands, Norway, the Republic of Ireland, and the United Kingdom. In the latter country, the song remained at the top of the UK Singles Chart for four weeks.

That version of the song also achieved high chart positions in the US, where it peaked at number four on the Billboard Hot 100 chart on May 21, 2016, and landed at number 15 for the year-end list of 2016. It also reached number one on both the Billboard Dance/Mix Show Airplay Chart and the Billboard Pop Songs chart. The song became Posner's biggest single, and was nominated for a Grammy Award for Song of the Year. In May 2016, it was incorporated into the official soundtrack album for MTV's Scream Season 2, appearing throughout the season, and re-released with Scream: Music from Season Two on July 29, 2016, under Island Records.

In March 2026, Posner returned to make a sequel to the song titled "I Went Back to Ibiza", followed by a remix version by David Guetta.

== Background ==
It was sort of a mystery pill. I was already under the influence of alcohol at the time. I had written a song with Avicii that week in Sweden called "Stay with You" and he was playing in Ibiza so I said, 'I will just go there with you,' because I was already in Europe. I don't have like a regular 9–5 job ... so might as well go to Ibiza, right? I had never been there before. So I went. We were at his show and I was drinking at the time. I just sort of moseyed out into the audience to watch Avicii spin from their point of view. I would go back and forth between the backstage and the VIP area and then where the actual kids were. And most people didn't know who the heck I was in Ibiza except for this one guy who recognized me. He was like, 'Are you Mike Posner?' and he was all excited. He holds up this little bag of pills and is like, 'You want one?' And drunk Mike Posner was like, 'Fuck it, yeah.' So I took one and I had never done that before, and then I felt amazing. Then when I came down I felt 10 years older.

— Mike Posner explaining the inspiration for the song, August 2015

The song presents a self reflection by Posner on how, his fame having long since faded, he has been left completely empty inside and unable to feel any kind of fulfillment, causing him to attempt to fill the void with rampant hedonism and material possessions. Posner's lyrics state he took the eponymous "pill" to impress Avicii, (real name Tim Bergling) a Swedish DJ who wrote a song with Posner called "Stay with You" in 2012. Bergling committed suicide in 2018 after years of struggling with drug and alcohol addiction.

Regarding their remix, SeeB told Official Charts: "We got it from Matt D'Arduini, VP A&R at Island Records. It was really slow and we only listened to the vocals on it. Matt sent us the multitrack of Mike's new EP and we picked Ibiza right away. Such a brilliant lyric and melody but it needed a new soundscape to be a hit." Posner has called the success of the remix version both "ironic" and "beautiful": "I wrote this sad thing, and it was me processing some dark and heavy emotion, and now people seem to be having their own joyous memories out of my sadness. That’s a very beautiful thing as an artist."

In March 2026, approaching the 11th anniversary of the song's release, Posner released "I Went Back to Ibiza" alongside its accompanying music video, serving as a reflective follow-up that retains most of the composition of the original track but contains rewritten lyrics detailing his transformative reflection of his life and his career.

== Composition ==
The original version of "I Took a Pill in Ibiza" by Posner is a folk pop song, and is written in the key of B ♭ major.

SeeB's remix is a tropical house song, and is written in the key of G minor in half time with a faster tempo of 102 beats per minute. It follows a chord progression of Gm – F – E♭maj7 – B♭, and Posner's vocals span from B♭_{2} to D_{4}.

== Critical reception ==
Billboard ranked "I Took a Pill in Ibiza" #30 on its "100 Best Pop Songs of 2016: Critics' Picks" list, writing, "The weirdness of 2016 might be best encapsulated by Mike Posner earning his first Hot 100 top 10 in nearly six years—and ending the year with a Grammy nomination for Song of the Year—for a song lamenting his status as 'a singer who already blew his shot.' That's due in part to the power of SeeB's buoyant, tropical house-flavored remix, but the cautionary tale of post-fame and excess drives it home, even as it ironically became Posner’s biggest hit yet."

Time was more negative toward the remix, stating, "Originally conceived as a folksy pop song in the vein of Jason Mraz, there was something clever about Posner's withering takedown of drug-taking EDM bro culture. But the much more popular SeeB remix sapped it of its wit, turning it into the exact thing it was satirizing. What a comedown."

== Controversy ==
In April 2016, it was reported that tourism officials in Ibiza, Spain, were "annoyed" by the song as they felt it contributed to Ibiza's reputation for drug-related debauchery due to lyrics in the song such as "I took a pill in Ibiza" and "You don't want to be high like me". The island's tourism director, Vicent Ferrer, stated, "We have invited the author of this song to discover Ibiza because we have much more to offer besides the nightlife which is known worldwide," and said that the island had been "typecast" due to its reputation for nightlife and as a partying destination.

== Music videos ==
The music video for the SeeB remix was launched first, via Posner's YouTube Vevo account, on February 26, 2016. It features Posner taking an unknown pill which transforms his face into a smiling papier-mâchéd mask representing himself. Posner spends the video becoming increasingly intoxicated as he mingles with girls and male friends at a crowded nightclub, before ending with Posner, back to his normal self, staring in silence at the reflection in a mirror of his empty papier-mâché form.

The music video for the original version was released on March 15, 2016. The black-and-white video features Posner standing silently with sheets of paper depicting lyrics of the song in a style similar to Bob Dylan's 1965 electric folk song, "Subterranean Homesick Blues". The music video was shot in Bateman's Buildings in London, an alleyway to the south of Soho Square Gardens, just off Oxford Street. As of May 2023, this music video has received over 44 million views on YouTube.

== Cover versions ==
In 2016, British jazz musician Jamie Cullum published a piano/bass/drums version of the Seeb remix as the sixth entry in his pop covers project The Song Society. According to Cullum, the trio learnt and recorded the song live "within 20 minutes", taking it "somewhere between the original acoustic version and the Seeb remix".

== Track listing ==
Digital download
No.	Title	Length
1.	"I Took a Pill in Ibiza" (SeeB Remix)	3:19

CD single
No.	Title	Length
1.	"I Took a Pill in Ibiza" (SeeB Remix)	3:18
2.	"I Took a Pill in Ibiza"	4:43
Total length:		8:01

Promotional CD single
No.	Title	Length
1.	"I Took a Pill in Ibiza" (SeeB Radio Edit) (Clean)	3:18
2.	"I Took a Pill in Ibiza" (SeeB Remix) (Clean)	4:00
3.	"I Took a Pill in Ibiza" (SeeB Radio Edit) (Dirty)	3:18
4.	"I Took a Pill in Ibiza" (SeeB Remix) (Dirty)	4:00
5.	"I Took a Plane to Ibiza" (SeeB Radio Edit) (Clean)	3:18
Total length:		17:54

== Charts ==
=== Weekly charts ===
2015–2016 weekly chart performance
Chart (2015–2016)	Peak position
Argentina Airplay (Monitor Latino)	3
Australia (ARIA)	5
Austria (Ö3 Austria Top 40)	4
Belgium (Ultratop 50 Flanders)	1
Belgium (Ultratop 50 Wallonia)	1
Belgium Dance (Ultratop Flanders)	1
Brazil Airplay (Brasil Hot 100)	5
Canada Hot 100 (Billboard)	2
Canada AC (Billboard)	21
Canada CHR/Top 40 (Billboard)	1
Canada Hot AC (Billboard)	7
CIS Airplay (TopHit)	14
Czech Republic Airplay (ČNS IFPI)	1
Czech Republic Singles Digital (ČNS IFPI)	3
Denmark (Tracklisten)	4
Ecuador Airplay (National-Report)	1
Euro Digital Songs (Billboard)	1
Finland (Suomen virallinen lista)	7
France (SNEP)	6
Germany (GfK)	5
Hungary (Dance Top 40)	10
Hungary (Rádiós Top 40)	10
Hungary (Single Top 40)	5
Hungary (Stream Top 40)	2
Ireland (IRMA)	1
Israel International Airplay (Media Forest)	1
Italy (FIMI)	7
Luxembourg Digital Song Sales (Billboard)	9
Netherlands (Dutch Top 40)	1
Netherlands (Single Top 100)	1
New Zealand (Recorded Music NZ)	3
Norway (VG-lista)	1
Poland Airplay (ZPAV)	2
Portugal (AFP)	2
Russia Airplay (TopHit)	10
Scottish Singles Sales (Official Charts)	1
Serbia Airplay (Radiomonitor)	3
Slovakia Airplay (ČNS IFPI)	2
Slovakia Singles Digital (ČNS IFPI)	1
Slovenia Airplay (SloTop50)	3
South Africa Airplay (EMA)	9
Spain (Promusicae)	4
Sweden (Sverigetopplistan)	7
Switzerland (Schweizer Hitparade)	4
Ukraine Airplay (TopHit)	37
UK Singles (Official Charts)	1
UK Dance (Official Charts)	1
US Billboard Hot 100	4
US Adult Contemporary (Billboard)	23
US Adult Pop Airplay (Billboard)	5
US Dance Club Songs (Billboard)	22
US Dance Airplay (Billboard)	1
US Pop Airplay (Billboard)	1
US Rhythmic Airplay (Billboard)	4

2017 weekly chart performance
Chart (2017)	Peak position
CIS Airplay (TopHit)	55
Russia Airplay (TopHit)	59
Ukraine Airplay (TopHit)	40

2018 weekly chart performance
Chart (2018)	Peak position
CIS Airplay (TopHit)	154
Russia Airplay (TopHit)	156

2019 weekly chart performance
Chart (2019)	Peak position
CIS Airplay (TopHit)	113
Russia Airplay (TopHit)	107
Ukraine Airplay (TopHit)	169

2023 weekly chart performance
Chart (2023)	Peak position
Romania Airplay (TopHit)	163

2025 weekly chart performance
Chart (2025)	Peak position
Belarus Airplay (TopHit)	174

2026 weekly chart performance
Chart (2026)	Peak position
Belarus Airplay (TopHit)	156
Lithuania Airplay (TopHit)	167

Weekly chart performance for "I Went Back to Ibiza"
Chart (2026)	Peak position
CIS Airplay (TopHit)	183
Latvia Airplay (LaIPA)	17
Lithuania Airplay (TopHit)	23
Moldova Airplay (TopHit)	193
Nigeria Bubbling Under Hot 100 (TurnTable)	16
Nigeria Airplay (TurnTable)	69
Romania Airplay (TopHit)	64
Romania TV Airplay (Media Forest)	20

=== Monthly charts ===
Monthly chart performance for "I Went Back to Ibiza"
Chart (2026)	Peak position
Lithuania Airplay (TopHit)	38
Romania Airplay (TopHit)	75

=== Year-end charts ===
Chart (2015–2016)	Position
Sweden (Sverigetopplistan)	76

Chart (2016)	Position
Argentina Airplay (Monitor Latino)	11
Australia (ARIA)	16
Austria (Ö3 Austria Top 40)	11
Belgium (Ultratop Flanders)	3
Belgium (Ultratop Wallonia)	6
Brazil (Brasil Hot 100)	27
Canada (Canadian Hot 100)	5
CIS (Tophit)	41
Denmark (Tracklisten)	11
France (SNEP)	19
Germany (Official German Charts)	11
Hungary (Dance Top 40)	32
Hungary (Rádiós Top 40)	46
Hungary (Single Top 40)	11
Iceland (Plötutíóindi)	17
Israel (Media Forest)	14
Italy (FIMI)	7
Netherlands (Dutch Top 40)	1
Netherlands (Single Top 100)	2
New Zealand (Recorded Music NZ)	12
Poland (ZPAV)	5
Russia Airplay (Tophit)	42
Slovenia (SloTop50)	17
Spain (PROMUSICAE)	10
Sweden (Sverigetopplistan)	7
Switzerland (Schweizer Hitparade)	7
Ukraine Airplay (Tophit)	78
UK Singles (Official Charts Company)	4
US Billboard Hot 100	15
US Adult Top 40 (Billboard)	25
US Dance/Mix Show Airplay (Billboard)	4
US Mainstream Top 40 (Billboard)	5
US Rhythmic (Billboard)	24

Chart (2017)	Position
Brazil (Pro-Música Brasil)	198
Hungary (Dance Top 40)	54
Hungary (Rádiós Top 40)	39

Chart (2022)	Position
Hungary (Rádiós Top 40)	73

Chart (2024)	Position
Hungary (Rádiós Top 40)	78

=== Decade-end charts ===
Chart (2010–2019)	Position
Netherlands (Single Top 100)	31
UK Singles (Official Charts Company)	52

== Certifications ==
Region	Certification	Certified units/sales
Australia (ARIA)	3× Platinum	210,000^{‡}
Belgium (BRMA)	3× Platinum	60,000^{‡}
Brazil (Pro-Música Brasil)	2× Diamond	500,000^{‡}
Canada (Music Canada)	7× Platinum	560,000^{‡}
Denmark (IFPI Danmark)	5× Platinum	450,000^{‡}
France (SNEP)	Diamond	233,333^{‡}
Germany (BVMI)	2× Platinum	800,000^{‡}
Italy (FIMI)	6× Platinum	300,000^{‡}
Netherlands (NVPI)	6× Platinum	180,000^{‡}
New Zealand (RMNZ)	6× Platinum	180,000^{‡}
Norway (IFPI Norway)	3× Platinum	120,000^{‡}
Poland (ZPAV)	Diamond	250,000^{‡}
Portugal (AFP)	3× Platinum	60,000^{‡}
Spain (Promusicae)	3× Platinum	120,000^{‡}
Sweden (GLF)	8× Platinum	320,000^{‡}
United Kingdom (BPI)	5× Platinum	3,000,000^{‡}
United States (RIAA)	6× Platinum	6,000,000^{‡}
^{‡} Sales+streaming figures based on certification alone.

== Release history ==
Region	Date	Format	Label	Ref.
United States	July 24, 2015	Digital download	Island	
United Kingdom	July 24, 2015	Digital download	Island	
