= A Real Good Kid =

Studio album by Mike Posner
- Released: January 18, 2019
- Length: 37:06
- Label: Island
- Producer: Adam Friedman; Pete Kuzma; Ryan Merchant; Nate Mercereau; Mike Posner; Ricky Reed; James Valentine

Mike Posner chronology
At Night, Alone (2016)	A Real Good Kid (2019)	Keep Going (2019)

Singles from A Real Good Kid
- 1. "Song About You" Released: September 10, 2018; 2. "Stuck in the Middle" Released: November 22, 2018; 3. "Move On" Released: January 4, 2019

Professional ratings
Review scores
Source	Rating
AllMusic	4.5/5 stars

A Real Good Kid is the third studio album by American singer Mike Posner, released on January 18, 2019, through Island Records. It was announced by Posner on social media on November 21, 2018. It was recorded by Posner over a two-year period. It was supported by the singles "Song About You", "Stuck in the Middle" and "Move On". To "celebrate" the release of the album, Posner walked across the United States from the Atlantic Ocean to the Pacific Ocean from March 2019.

== Background ==
In the two-year period that the album was recorded, Posner was dealing with the end of a relationship, then moved back to Detroit to care for his terminally ill father, who later died of brain cancer, and his friend Avicii committed suicide. Posner said: "I had to go to the studio everyday and I was trying to just show up and record all the songs and do a good job and I was sad." In a press statement, Posner said the album "deals heavily with love, loss and eventual acceptance". The album includes recordings of Mike's father.

== Track listing ==
No.	Title	Writer(s)	Producer(s)	Length
1.	"Introduction"	Mike Posner	Posner	1:06
2.	"January 11, 2017"	Posner; Pete Kuzma; Adam Friedman	Posner; Friedman; Nate Mercereau	3:07
3.	"Wide Open"	Posner; Friedman; James Bowen Falson; Jean Marc Belkadi	Posner; Ricky Reed; Mercereau; Friedman^{[a]}	2:49
4.	"Song About You"	Posner; Eric Frederic; Dan Wilson	Reed	3:10
5.	"Move On"	Posner; Friedman; Frederic; Wilson; Mercereau	Reed	2:58
6.	"Drip"	Posner; James Valentine	Posner; Reed; Mercereau; Valentine	5:25
7.	"Staring at the Fire"	Posner	Posner; Reed; Mercereau	2:38
8.	"Perfect"	Posner; Kuzma; Ryan Merchant; Mercereau	Reed; Mercereau; Posner; Friedman; Merchant; Kuzma	6:24
9.	"Amen"			0:31
10.	"Stuck in the Middle"	Posner; Friedman	Reed; Mercereau; Friedman	3:21
11.	"One More Song"			0:12
12.	"How It's Supposed to Be"	Posner	Posner; Reed; Mercereau	5:25
Total length:				37:06

Note

- "Introduction" is not included on the CD version of the album.

== Personnel ==
Musicians

- Mike Posner – vocals (tracks 1–8, 10, 12), drum programming (track 2), acoustic guitar (3, 10, 12), electric guitar (3, 5), 808s (7)
- Adam Friedman – backing vocals (tracks 2, 10), chopping (3); bass guitar, drum programming (8); synthesizer (10)
- Nate Mercereau – drum programming (tracks 2, 6), guitar synthesizer (3, 4, 6), French horn (3, 8, 12), percussion (3, 8, 10); electric guitar, synthesizer (5, 7, 8, 10, 12); drop section, bass synthesizer, Wilsonic (6); bass guitar (7, 8, 10, 12); piano, treated piano (7); drop piano, glockenspiel, string synthesizer, string arrangement, trumpet (8); Mellotron (12)
- Pete Kuzna – synthesizer (tracks 2, 8), vocal arrangement (2), transition piano (7), piano (8)
- James Bowen – acoustic guitar (track 3)
- Ricky Reed – drum programming, programming (3–5, 7, 8, 10, 12); synthesizer (3, 4, 7), Wilsonic (3), bass guitar (4, 5), percussion (7)
- Dan Wilson – guitar (track 4)
- Victor Indrizzo – drums (tracks 5, 10, 12), percussion (5)
- Arjun Singh – tabla (track 5)
- James Valentine – acoustic guitar, electric guitar (track 6)
- Daniel Casares – flute (track 7)
- Matthew Schuler – additional vocals (track 8)
- Stewart Cole – trumpet (track 8)
- Shaina Evoniuk – violin (track 8)
- M. Jon Posner – vocals (tracks 9, 11)

Technical

- Chris Gehringer – mastering
- Ricky Reed – mixing (tracks 1–8, 10, 12)
- Ethan Shumaker– engineering (tracks 1–8, 10, 12)
- Nate Mercereau – engineering (tracks 3, 6, 7, 8, 10, 12)
- Bill Melina – engineering (tracks 5, 12)
- Robert Dugan – engineering (track 8)
- Mike Posner – recording (tracks 1, 8, 10)

Visuals

- Eric Gorvin – art direction, design, cover illustration, package production

== Charts ==
Chart (2019)	Peak position
US Top Current Album Sales (Billboard)	73
