= At Night, Alone =

At Night, Alone.

Studio album by Mike Posner
- Released: May 6, 2016
- Recorded: 2015
- Studio: Mike's House (Southfield); Kensaltown Recording (Kensal Rise); EastWest Studios (Hollywood); Hideout (Las Vegas); Mirrorball (North Hollywood)
- Genre: Acoustic pop; electronic
- Length: 58:17
- Label: Island
- Producer: Mike Posner; Martin Terefe; Adam Friedman; MdL

Mike Posner chronology
The Truth (2015)	At Night, Alone. (2016)	A Real Good Kid (2019)

Singles from At Night, Alone
- 1. "I Took a Pill in Ibiza" Released: July 24, 2015; 2. "Be as You Are" Released: July 26, 2016; 3. "In the Arms of a Stranger" Released: February 17, 2017

At Night, Alone. is the second studio album by American singer Mike Posner. It was released on May 6, 2016 by Island Records. The album features guest appearances by Labrinth and Big Sean.

The album received positive reviews from music critics, who celebrated the record's mature sound, and his autobiographic and introspective lyrical content. The album was considered a qualitative big step forward from his previous album 31 Minutes to Takeoff.

== Background ==
Mike Posner released his first single in two years, "The Way It Used to Be" in June 2013, and announced the release of his second album Pages. In October 2013, Posner said in an interview with Billboard: "I've made maybe over 100 songs since the last album, so I've got a good 12, 15 I'm proud of." A second single featuring Big Sean, "Top of the World" was released in December 2013. In March 2014, Billboard reported that Pages would be released later that year, but the release never materialized. Instead, Posner released the extended play, The Truth in June 2015 on Island Records, featuring four tracks later featured on At Night, Alone.

"I Took a Pill in Ibiza" was released as a single on July 24, 2015, and found international success in a remix by Seeb. In August 2015, Posner said that he had recorded two albums (Pages and Sky High) since his debut album, 31 Minutes to Takeoff (2010), which were both shelved by his former label RCA Records because "they didn't have a hit".

Posner said country singer Jake Owen encouraged him to "tell the truth" in his songs" and showed him artists like Willie Nelson and Merle Haggard, which made Posner realize that "you can just literally say the truth and it’s beautiful, and it’s heart-wrenching and it’s funny". The album is inspired by country music according to Posner: "So, like, the way I was inspired by hip-hop when I first started and would sort of sing hip-hop, this new (music) is kind of my take on country music. It doesn't sound country and no one uses the word country to describe it, but it's me trying to do country and it comes out weird and different."

== Singles ==
"I Took a Pill in Ibiza" was first released on Mike Posner's extended play, The Truth, on June 22, 2015. The remix version by Seeb was released on July 24, 2015. The song would become Posner's biggest hit to date, peaking at number four on the US Billboard Hot 100.

=== Promotional singles ===
"Be as You Are" was released as promotional single in the United States on July 26, 2016. On February 17, 2017 a remix of "In the Arms of a Stranger" by Grey was released as promotional single.

== Reception ==
Professional ratings
Review scores
Source	Rating
AllMusic	3.5/5 stars
The Guardian	2/5 stars
Idolator	3.5/5

David Jeffries of AllMusic noted an improvement for Posner in the album, writing, "This might not yet be the ultimate showcase for his talents, but At Night, Alone is both a welcome return and a significant step forward." Jordan Simon of Idolator wrote, "Posner on the album places his bets as pop's 'born-again' countryman," calling the album "not a pop jamboree. It is truth in advertising, an album exclusively optimized for solitude spent immersed in deep thought." Gwilym Mumford of The Guardian wrote, "Some curios apart—the a cappella revolutionary hymn 'Only God Knows' and rowdy folk-punk of 'Jade'—there is little here that lingers long in the memory, with only Posner's braggadocio and pinched vocals distinguishing him from the singer-songwriter crowd."

== Track listing ==
No.	Title	Writer(s)	Producer(s)	Length
1.	"At Night, Alone."	Posner	Posner	0:10
2.	"I Took a Pill in Ibiza"	Posner	Posner; Martin Terefe	4:40
3.	"Not That Simple"	Posner; Adam Friedman; Ely Rise	Posner; Terefe; Friedman	3:54
4.	"Be as You Are"	Posner; Friedman	Posner; Friedman; Terefe^{[a]}	3:53
5.	"In the Arms of a Stranger"	Posner	Posner; Terefe; Friedman; MdL	3:47
6.	"Silence" (featuring Labrinth)	Posner; Timothy McKenzie	Posner; Terefe	4:18
7.	"Iris"	Posner; Friedman	Posner; Friedman; MdL	3:31
8.	"Only God Knows"	Posner	Posner	2:45
9.	"Jade"	Posner	Posner; MdL	3:41
10.	"One Hell of a Song"	Posner	Posner; Friedman; MdL	3:16
11.	"Buried in Detroit"	Posner	Posner; Terefe	4:08
12.	"Thank You"	Posner	Posner	0:08
13.	"I Took a Pill in Ibiza" (SeeB Remix)	Posner	Posner; Terefe; SeeB^{[b]}	3:17
14.	"Not That Simple" (Kyle Tree Remix)	Posner; Adam Friedman; Ely Rise	Posner; Terefe; Friedman; Kyle Tree^{[b]}	3:27
15.	"Be as You Are" (JordanXL Remix)	Posner; Friedman	Posner; Friedman; Terefe^{[a]}; JordanXL^{[b]}	3:23
16.	"In the Arms of a Stranger" (Brian Kierulf Remix)	Posner	Posner; Terefe; Friedman; MdL; Brian Kierulf^{[b]}	3:27
17.	"Silence" (Sluggo x Loote Remix) (featuring Labrinth)	Posner; McKenzie	Posner; Terefe; Dave Katz^{[b]}; Jackson Foote^{[b]}	3:09
18.	"Buried in Detroit" (Lucas Löwe Remix) (featuring Big Sean)	Posner; Sean Anderson	Posner; Terefe; Jordan Orvosh^{[b]}	3:23
Total length:				58:17

Target exclusive edition bonus tracks
No.	Title	Writer(s)	Producer(s)	Length
19.	"Stay with You"	Posner	Posner; Robopop; MdL	2:50
20.	"Miley Cyrus"	Posner	Posner; Terefe; Friedman	6:10
Total length:				1:07:17

Notes

- ^{^[a]} signifies an additional producer
- ^{^[b]} signifies a remixer

== Personnel ==
Adapted from the liner notes:

I Took a Pill in Ibiza

- Mike Posner – lead and background vocals
- Eugene Huang – guitar
- Nikolaj Torp – piano, Wurlitzer electric piano, whistle
- Martin Terefe – bass and background vocals
- Geoff Lea – drums
- Oskar Winberg – additional percussion
- Recorded by Sam Keyte at Kensaltown Recording Studios
- Vocals recorded by Mike Posner at Mike's House
- Mixed by Tony Maserati and Tyler Scott at Mirrorball Studios

Not That Simple

- Mike Posner – lead and background vocals, piano and space echo
- Glen Scott – piano and organ
- Adam Friedman – guitar
- Martin Terefe – bass
- Kristoffer Sonne – drums and percussion
- Forrest D. Gray – string arrangement
- Recorded by Sam Keyte at Kensaltown Recording Studios, assisted by Kristian Larsen
- Vocals recorded by Mike Posner at Mike's House
- Additional recording by Oskar Winberg
- Mixed by Tony Maserati and Tyler Scott at Mirrorball Studios

Be as You Are

- Mike Posner – lead and background vocals
- Adam Friedman – keyboards, guitar, drums and percussion, background vocals
- Simon Huber – bass
- Alex Toff – drums
- Oskar Winberg – percussion
- Ro Rowan – cello
- Vocals recorded by Mike Posner at Mike's House
- Mixed by Tony Maserati and Tyler Scott at Mirrorball Studios

In the Arms of a Stranger

- Mike Posner – lead and background vocals, keyboards, space echo
- Glen Scott – keyboards
- Adam Friedman – guitar
- Martin Terefe – bass
- Kristoffer Sonne – drums
- Recorded by Sam Keyte at Kensaltown Recording Studios, assisted by Kristian Larsen
- Vocals recorded by Mike Posner at Mike's House
- Additional recording by Oskar Winberg
- Mixed by Tony Maserati and Tyler Scott at Mirrorball Studios

Silence

- Mike Posner – lead and background vocals, keyboards, piano and space echo
- Glen Scott – keyboards
- Adam Friedman – guitar
- Martin Terefe – bass
- Kristoffer Sonne – drums
- Recorded by Sam Keyte at Kensaltown Recording Studios, assisted by Kristian Larsen
- Vocals recorded by Mike Posner at Mike's House
- Additional recording by Oskar Winberg
- Mixed by Tony Maserati and Tyler Scott at Mirrorball Studios

Iris

- Mike Posner – lead and background vocals
- Adam Friedman – guitar, keyboards, drums, percussion, background vocals
- Erick "Jesus" Coomes – bass
- MdL – drums and percussion
- Recorded by Adam Friedman, MdL and Mike Posner at Mike's House
- Mixed by Tony Maserati and Tyler Scott at Mirrorball Studios

Only God Knows

- Mike Posner – lead and background vocals
- Norman Henry Mamey – "words of wisdom"
- Recorded by Mike Posner at Mike's House
- Mixed by Tony Maserati and Tyler Scott at Mirrorball Studios

Jade

- Mike Posner – lead and background vocals
- Ely "The Creep" Rise – keyboards, organ
- Nick Maybury – guitar
- Bana Haffar – bass
- MdL – drums and percussion, programming
- Recorded by Mike Posner and Mason Levy at Mike's House
- Mixed by Tony Maserati and Tyler Scott at Mirrorball Studios

One Hell of a Song

- Mike Posner – lead and background vocals
- James Valentine – guitar
- Erick "Jesus" Coomes – bass
- Adam Friedman – drums, percussion, background vocals
- MdL – drums
- Recorded by Mike Posner and Adam Friedman at Mike's House
- Mixed by Tony Maserati and Tyler Scott at Mirrorball Studios

Buried in Detroit

- Mike Posner – lead and background vocals, piano
- Glenn Scott – Rhodes piano
- Martin Terefe – bass
- Kristoffer Sonne – drums and percussion
- Steven Pemberton – drums
- Oskar Winberg, John Magnussen – additional percussion
- Norman Henry Mamey – orchestral arrangement and conductor
- Bob O'Donnell – orchestra contractor
- Michael Markman, Neil Sample, Leslie Katz, Rebecca Chung, Lisa Dondlinger, Lorand Lokuszta, Lorenz Gamma, Tamaa Chernyak-Pepp, Marisa Sorajja, Radu Pieptka – violins
- Nancy Roth, Pamela Goldsmith – violas
- Dennis Karamazyn, Paul Hochhalter – cellos
- Kevin Axt – brass
- Brian Scanlon, Jeff Driskhill, Phillip Feather, John Carr – woodwinds
- Gary Halopoff, Chris Tedesco – trumpets
- Charles Morillas, David Ryan, Craig Ware – trombones
- Amy Wilkins – harp
- Recorded by Sam Keyte at Kensaltown Recording Studios, assisted by Kristian Larsen
- Orchestra recorded by Dennis Sands at EastWest Studios
- Piano and additional vocals recorded by Josh Connolly, Dominic Jordan, Jimmy Giannos at the Hideout Recording Studio
- Additional recording by Oskar Winberg
- Mixed by Tony Maserati and Tyler Scott at Mirrorball Studios

== Charts ==
=== Weekly charts ===
Weekly chart performance for At Night, Alone
Chart (2016)	Peak position
Australian Albums (ARIA)	60
Belgian Albums (Ultratop Flanders)	120
Belgian Albums (Ultratop Wallonia)	96
Canadian Albums (Billboard)	6
Finnish Albums (Suomen virallinen lista)	19
French Albums (SNEP)	184
Irish Albums (IRMA)	87
Norwegian Albums (VG-lista)	11
Swedish Albums (Sverigetopplistan)	18
Swiss Albums (Schweizer Hitparade)	63
UK Albums (OCC)	79
US Billboard 200	12

=== Year-end charts ===
Year-end chart performance for At Night, Alone
Chart (2016)	Position
Swedish Albums (Sverigetopplistan)	96
US Billboard 200	163

== Certifications ==
Certifications for At Night, Alone
Region	Certification	Certified units/sales
Brazil (Pro-Música Brasil)	Gold	20,000^{‡}
Denmark (IFPI Danmark)	Gold	10,000^{‡}
New Zealand (RMNZ)	Gold	7,500^{‡}
Poland (ZPAV)	Gold	10,000^{‡}
Singapore (RIAS)	Gold	5,000^{*}
Sweden (GLF)	Gold	20,000^{‡}
^{*} Sales figures based on certification alone.^{‡} Sales+streaming figures based on certification alone.
