= 31 Minutes to Takeoff =

Studio album by Mike Posner
- Released: 10 August 2010
- Recorded: 2009–2010
- Genre: Electropop
- Length: 37:57
- Label: J
- Producers: Mike Posner; Gigamesh; Benny Blanco; The Smeezingtons; Cisco Adler; Greg Kurstin; Raw Talent

Mike Posner chronology
One Foot Out the Door (2009)	31 Minutes to Takeoff (2010)	At Night, Alone (2016)

Singles from 31 Minutes To Takeoff
- 1. "Cooler Than Me" Released: 16 April 2010; 2. "Please Don't Go" Released: 9 June 2010; 3. "Bow Chicka Wow Wow" Released: 3 February 2011

31 Minutes to Takeoff is the debut studio album by American singer Mike Posner. It was released on 10 August 2010, by J Records. The album includes the singles "Cooler Than Me", "Please Don't Go" and "Bow Chicka Wow Wow".

== Background ==
Posner's idea for the album was to make something that didn't sound like anything that was already out. In an interview with Billboard, Posner argues: "My music doesn't sound like anyone else's, and it's important for me that it stays that way", and that "I want to make songs that will bring people together", Posner has stated that he draws a great deal of influence for his music from his hometown "Where I grew up was a huge influence on my music." He also said that "A lot of people have trouble putting into words what my music is, and it's because of where I grew up". Meanwhile, speaking to Blues & Soul about the album's stylistic diversity, he described it as "A 21st Century album – meaning that, instead of listening to 12 different artists on your iPod, with my record you can just listen to ONE! Because every song is refreshing and different from the one before, and at the same time BETTER than the one before!"

The title of the album, 31 Minutes to Takeoff, is in fact a reference to something that occurs exactly 31 minutes into the record. As Posner himself describes it "Something happens 31 minutes into the record ... All I can say is that both the listener and I will be in a higher place when it's over". 31 minutes into the CD, during "Synthesizer", there is a sound of an airplane taking off.

== Music and lyrics ==
Musically, 31 Minutes to Takeoff consists of a blend of pop, R&B, and dance songs with heavy use of synthesizers straight out of the 1980s, influences of hip hop music while also incorporating electronic music with clever hooks and catchy beats. Songs like "Please Don't Go", "Cooler Than Me", and "Cheated", are up-tempo dance songs. "Please Don't Go" is an electropop song with an R&B infused beat and heavy-use "video game" like synths in its chorus. "Cheated" follows a similar path, with a more dance oriented beat and repetitive hook, and "Cooler Than Me", is electropop based with nu-disco influences. "Bow Chicka Wow Wow", "Déjà Vu", and "Do You Wanna?" are mid-tempo songs carrying R&B sounds, with "Delta 1406" following the same path with a faded beat. "Bow Chicka Wow Wow" carries its R&B sound with a rock music feel, while "Déjà Vu", a song written with Teddy Riley, blends 1990s R&B sound with contemporary pop and features Boyz II Men on background vocals. "Do You Wanna?" is a hip hop old-school R&B song, with stax horns, whistles, over a bluesy guitar that samples Ray LaMontagne "You Are The Best Thing". "Gone In September" is a pop acoustic-rock tune, while "Save Your Goodbye," and "Synthesizer" are synthpop ballads.

Lyrically, the album references Posner's personal experiences, ranging from love and rise to fame at age 22. Its first single "Cooler Than Me" is about a girl who thinks she's cooler than anybody and "needs everyone's eyes just to feel seen." In an interview with US Weekly, Posner says the "song was inspired by a girl [I] went to Duke with, but she doesn't deserve any notoriety". "Bow Chicka Wow Wow" is a song 'to reel a woman in.' "Cheated" sees Posner singing about his regret at not cheating on a former flame who cheated on him with lyrics like "I should have cheated on you/ I was everything you wanted and more/ I should have cheated on you / nobody told me I was dating a whore", while later calls out his ex by name. "Gone In September" is a song about Posner breaking up with a woman. "Delta 1406" is a song about Posner's current rise to fame, written on his flight back home to Detroit, after spending 5 months in Los Angeles, (“I’ve got to book hotels for my Detroit shows”) says Posner as a reflection of what he was dealing with at the time. "Please Don't Go" shows Posner begging a girl to stay.

== Promotion ==
Posner was part of Warped Tour which takes a North American leg. 42 Tour dates were announced via Mike's official MySpace account, and will take place through the summer of 2010. On May 31, 2010, Posner appeared on Lopez Tonight with a performance of "Cooler Than Me". Fifteen days later, he appeared on America's Got Talent with a performance of "Cooler Than Me".

== Singles ==
"Cooler Than Me" was released as the album's lead single. The song reached the top ten in the US, peaking at number six, and the top five peaking at number three in New Zealand and number five in Canada. The song's video was released on YouTube and features Posner in a party with girls wearing sunglasses. Snowboarder Louie Vito makes a cameo appearance in the video. It sold over 2,000,000 downloads in the US. "Please Don't Go" was released on iTunes on July 19, 2010, and was confirmed as the album's second single. It debuted at number ninety-four on the Billboard Hot 100 and has peaked at number sixteen. It sold over 1,000,000 downloads in the US.

"Bow Chicka Wow Wow" was released as the third single on February 3, 2011, and features American rapper Lil Wayne. The song was released on the radio on February 22, 2011. It debuted at number eighty-two on the Billboard Hot 100 and has reached number thirty. It sold over 500,000 downloads in the US.

== Critical response ==
Professional ratings
Review scores
Source	Rating
The A.V. Club	C+
Boston Globe	mixed
Entertainment Weekly	B
The New York Times	unfavorable
Rolling Stone	2.5/5 stars
Slant Magazine	2.5/5 stars
The Washington Post	unfavorable
Allmusic	3.5/5 stars

The album has received mixed reviews from critics, with some complimenting the electro-pop sound, while others felt it was neither new nor fresh. According to Metacritic, which assigns a normalized rating out of 100 to reviews from mainstream critics, the album holds a score of 58 out of 100, indicating "mixed or average reviews", based on 8 reviews. Leah Greenblatt of Entertainment Weekly gave the album a B, praising Posner's breezy anthems. David Jeffries of Allmusic also wrote favorably of the album, stating, "Posner’s entertaining debut is right in line with his reported Duke grade point average of B+".

== Commercial performance ==
The album debuted at number eight on the US Billboard 200, with first-week sales of 29,000 copies. The album has sold 177,000 copies in the US as of April 2016.

== Track listing ==
All lyrics are written by Mike Posner, except "Déjà Vu" co-written by Nathan Morris, Wanya Morris and Shawn Stockman.

No.	Title	Music	Producer(s)	Length
1.	"31 Minutes to Takeoff"	Mike Posner	Mike Posner	0:54
2.	"Please Don't Go"	Posner; Benjamin Levin	Posner; Benny Blanco	3:17
3.	"Bow Chicka Wow Wow"	Posner; Bruno Mars; Philip Lawrence; Ari Levine; Christopher Steven Brown	The Smeezingtons; Cisse Methods	3:15
4.	"Cooler Than Me (Gigamesh Remix)"	Posner; Eric Holljes	Gigamesh; Jordan J. Sirhan	3:36
5.	"Déjà Vu" (featuring Boyz II Men)	Posner; Teddy Riley	Posner	3:05
6.	"Do U Wanna?"	Posner; Cisco Adler; Ray LaMontagne	Cisco Adler	2:31
7.	"Cheated"	Posner; Levin	Posner; Blanco	3:20
8.	"Gone in September" (featuring Travis Barker)	Posner; Adler; Travis Barker	Posner; Cisco Adler	3:39
9.	"Save Your Goodbye"	Posner; Greg Kurstin	Greg Kurstin	3:35
10.	"Synthesizer"	Posner; Kurstin	Posner; Kurstin	4:11
11.	"Delta 1406"	Posner; Emmanuel Griggs; Roderick A. Marshall	Posner; Raw Talent	3:05
12.	"Falling"	Posner; Kurstin	Posner; Kurstin	3:39

iTunes Store bonus track
No.	Title	Producer(s)	Length
13.	"Another Love Song"	Mike Posner	2:54

United Kingdom and Brazilian bonus track
No.	Title	Music	Length
13.	"XO"	Posner; Jesse Rogg	3:03

German bonus tracks
No.	Title	Music	Producer(s)	Length
13.	"XO"	Posner; Jesse Rogg		3:03
14.	"Evil Woman"	Jeff Lynne	Mike Posner	2:57

== Charts ==
Chart performance for 31 Minutes to Takeoff
Chart (2010)	Peak position
Australian Hitseekers Albums (ARIA)	2
Belgian Alternative Albums (Ultratop Flanders)	49
Belgian Heatseekers Albums (Ultratop Flanders)	17
Belgian Heatseekers Albums (Ultratop Wallonia)	14
Canadian Albums (Nielsen SoundScan)	32
French Albums (SNEP)	120
Greek Albums (IFPI)	36
UK Albums (Official Charts)	178
UK Dance Albums (Official Charts)	6
US Billboard 200	8

== Certifications ==
Certifications for 31 Minutes to Takeoff
Region	Certification	Certified units/sales
New Zealand (RMNZ)	Platinum	15,000^{‡}
United States (RIAA)	Platinum	1,000,000^{‡}
^{‡} Sales+streaming figures based on certification alone.
