= Mike Posner =

American singer (born 1988)

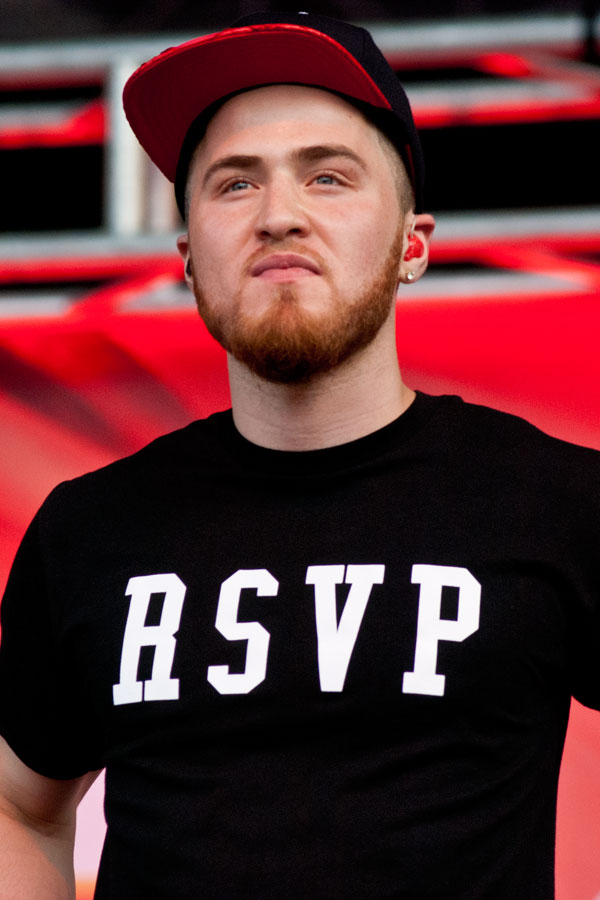
- Posner at the B96 Pepsi SummerBash in 2012

Background information
- Born: Michael Robert Henrion Posner; February 12, 1988 (age 38); Detroit, Michigan, U.S.
- Origin: Southfield, Michigan, U.S.
- Genres: Pop; electronic; folk; hip-hop; R&B
- Occupations: Singer; rapper; songwriter; record producer; poet
- Instruments: Vocals; guitar; keyboards
- Works: Mike Posner discography
- Years active: 2007–present
- Labels: J; RCA; Island; Arista; Monster Mountain; Warner
- Member of: Mansionz
- Website: mikeposner.com

Michael Robert Henrion Posner (/ˈpoʊznər/ POHZ-nər; born February 12, 1988) is an American singer, rapper, songwriter, poet, and record producer from Detroit. He signed with J Records in 2009 and released his debut single "Cooler Than Me" the following year. The song peaked at number six on the Billboard Hot 100 and received septuple platinum certification by the Recording Industry Association of America (RIAA). His follow-up single, "Please Don't Go" peaked within the top 20 of the chart and received triple platinum certification; both songs preceded the release of his debut album, 31 Minutes to Takeoff (2010), which peaked at number 12 on the Billboard 200 and received mixed critical reception. In 2014, Posner parted ways with J Records in favor of Island Records.

In 2015, an EDM remix of Posner's song "I Took a Pill in Ibiza" peaked within the top ten on the charts in 27 countries, and the top five of the Billboard Hot 100. Its success led to the release of his second studio album, At Night, Alone (2016), which peaked at number eight on the Billboard 200 and was met with positive critical reception. His third album, A Real Good Kid was released in 2019. His fourth album Operation: Wake Up (2020), was met with continued praise despite failing to chart.

Along with his recording career, he has served as a record producer and songwriter for acts including Justin Bieber, Big Sean, Maroon 5, Iggy Azalea, Big Time Rush, Austin Mahone, Nick Jonas, Cher Lloyd, and Labrinth; he co-wrote "Boyfriend" by Justin Bieber and "Sugar" by Maroon 5, among others. In 2017, Posner released his first book of poetry, Tear Drops & Balloons. He is also one-half of alternative hip-hop duo Mansionz, completed by Florida rapper blackbear.

== Early life ==
Michael Robert Henrion Posner was born on February 12, 1988, in Detroit. He grew up in Southfield, a western suburb of Detroit. He has a sister who is six years older. His father was a criminal defense lawyer who was Jewish and his mother is Catholic. Posner attended Bingham Farms Elementary School, Berkshire Middle School, and graduated from Groves High School where he ran varsity track and cross-country. He attended Duke University, where he was a member of the Sigma Nu fraternity. He graduated with a B.A. degree in sociology with a 3.6 GPA.

Posner's father, Jon, died on January 11, 2017; his mother is Roberta Henrion; and his sister, Emily Henrion Posner, is a civil rights attorney.

== Career ==
=== 2008–2010: 31 Minutes to Takeoff ===
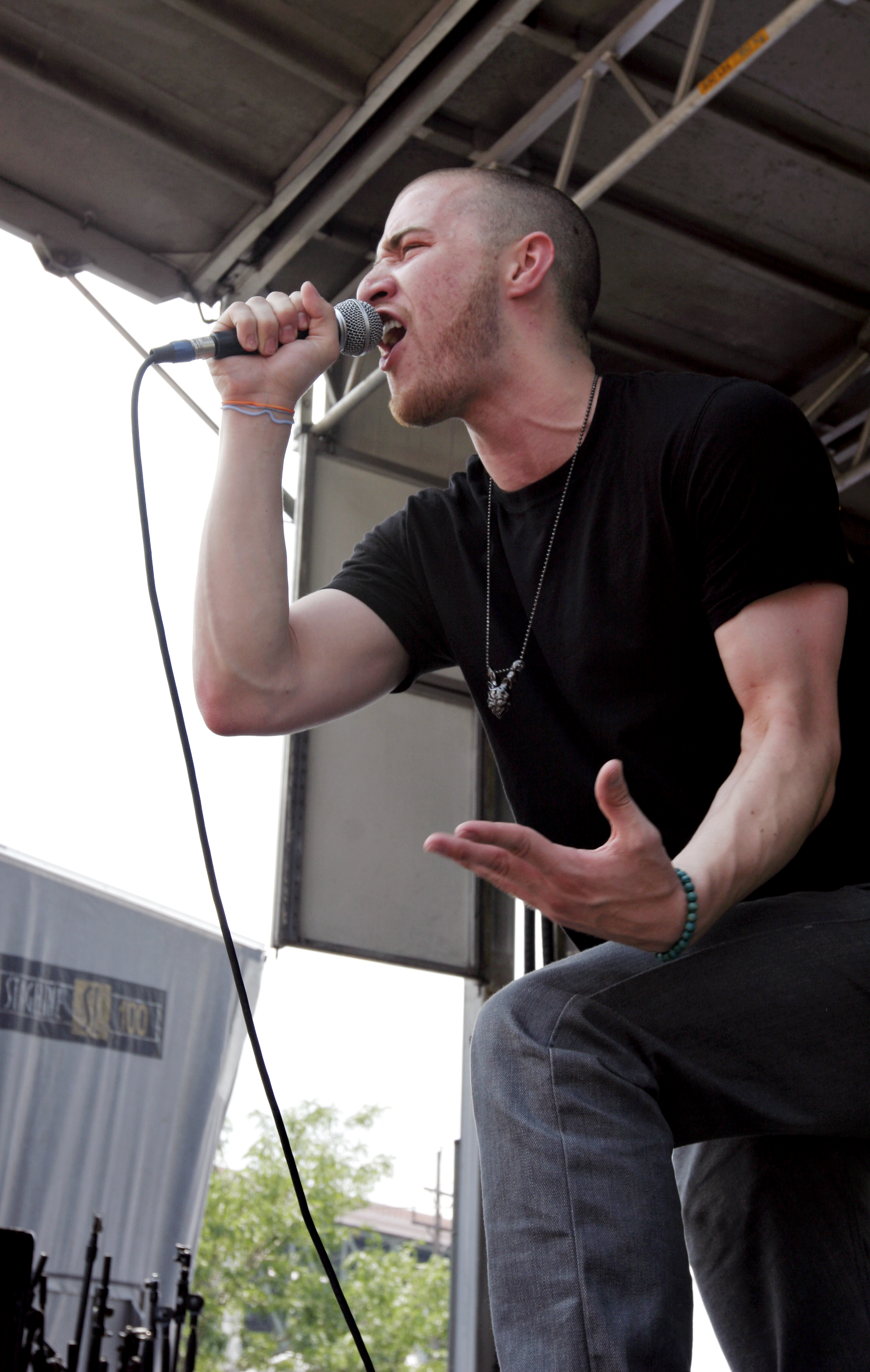
Posner in 2010

Posner started out as a record producer, working on some tracks with his hometown friend Big Sean. Posner's second mixtape, A Matter of Time (his first mixtape was Reflections of a Lost Teen) started attracting industry attention in 2009. Working with Don Cannon and DJ Benzi, the mixtape was recorded at Duke University in March 2009 under the name "Mike Posner & the Brain Trust", the Brain Trust referring to Posner's supporters. The release was unusual for being distributed for free through iTunes U, a channel designed for educational audio content. Although Posner was not the only artist to take advantage of this loophole, his release was the most organized and high profile, and attracted the largest response, immediately reaching the number one position on the iTunes U chart. Posner signed a record deal with J Records (RCA/Sony) in July 2009, after his junior year at Duke University. He chose to return to Duke after signing and toured on the weekends while at the same time recording for his debut album.

Posner's third mixtape One Foot Out the Door was released in October 2009. The mixtape was accompanied by a web series of the same name which aired bi-weekly from September to December. His debut album, 31 Minutes to Takeoff was released in August 2010. The first single, "Cooler Than Me" peaked at number 6 on the US Billboard Hot 100. He performed at Bonnaroo, a music festival, and on the 2010s Warped Tour. The second and third singles, "Please Don't Go" and "Bow Chicka Wow Wow" reached the top 20 and 30 on the Hot 100 respectively. The latter was released with an added verse by rapper Lil Wayne. Posner won a 2011's ASCAP Award from the publishing organization for "Cooler Than Me". On October 7, 2011, RCA Music Group announced that it was disbanding J Records along with Arista Records and Jive Records. With the shutdown, Posner (and all other artists previously signed to the three labels) would release his future material on the RCA Records brand.

=== 2011–2014: The Layover ===
After the release of his debut album, Posner began working on his second studio album under the title Sky High and released the single "Looks Like Sex" to digital outlets on December 2, 2011. As a prelude to the release of the album, he released a third mixtape, The Layover. However, with the success of his first album, he began to feel uncomfortable with being in the spotlight and struggled with depression. He took a break from making music to write and produce songs for other artists. He later announced via Twitter that his next upcoming album would be titled Pages and would be released in early June or late in the summer of 2013. His single "The Way It Used To Be" premiered on digital outlets on June 11, 2013. In September 2013, it was announced that he had filmed a music video for his new single "Top of the World" which would appear on his upcoming Page 1 EP, set for release in October. The song was originally used for a Reebok campaign, and made available as a free download under the title "Tapada World" as a special remix. The song was released on December 17, 2013, featuring Big Sean; the music video came out on December 19.

On March 4, 2014, Posner announced the Unplugged tour. Running seven dates in the major US markets, the tour highlighted music new and old from his discography, including some new material from Pages, while also giving fans a shot at learning new information from him through the stories and Q&A sessions interspersed with the tunes. The unplugged sets featured little more than him on predominantly acoustic instruments, save for the potential live production on "a song or two"—much like, he says, how much of his music starts. Posner began the tour on March 31 at the World Cafe in Philadelphia, wrapping up on April 10 at The Mint in Los Angeles. The string of dates included a hometown show in Posner's native Detroit, his first such show, he says, in around two years. In an interview with Billboard, Mike revealed that he had signed with Island Records and that Pages would be replaced with another project. He also said that he would like to let the world hear his recordings from Sky High and Pages.

=== 2015–2020: At Night, Alone, Mansionz, A Real Good Kid, and The Walk Across America ===
On April 15, 2015, Posner released a stripped-down single, "I Took a Pill in Ibiza", on his Vevo account. The song was shared in an exclusive EP titled The Truth that Posner made available to fans through his email signup list. He later confirmed that the EP would be made available to purchase from online retailers on June 22. In addition, Posner said that his second studio album would be released after the EP.

"I Took a Pill in Ibiza" was remixed by Norwegian production duo SeeB, whose version of the song has over one billion streams on Spotify and a charting position of two on the Global Top 50 Chart and five on the USA Top 50 Chart. The SeeB remix topped the charts in the Netherlands, Ireland, Norway, the United Kingdom, and the Dance/Mix Show Airplay of American Billboard; it peaked within the top ten of the charts in Australia, Austria, Canada, Denmark, Finland, New Zealand, Sweden, Switzerland, and the United States.

On December 18, 2015, a remix EP of The Truth was released. It featured SeeB's remix of "I Took a Pill in Ibiza", as well as a remix by JordanXL of the single "Be As You Are". On March 17, 2016, Posner announced his second album, At Night, Alone, which was released on May 6, 2016, and featured both originals and remixes of "I Took a Pill in Ibiza" and "Be As You Are". David Jeffries of AllMusic noted an improvement for Posner in the album, writing "this might not yet be the ultimate showcase for his talents, but At Night, Alone is both a welcome return and a significant step forward." On February 17, 2017, Posner announced that the third single from the album would be a remix by American electronic duo Grey of his song "In the Arms of a Stranger". In 2017, he began to explore new ground. Not only did he release a book of poetry, Teardrops and Balloons, on March 17, but he also put out a new collaboration with American singer blackbear under the name Mansionz. A soulful hip hop project with spoken word influence, the song was a collaboration with rapper Spark Master Tape titled "Stfu". Mansionz is signed to Island Records and has released three singles, "Stfu" (featuring Spark Master Tape), "Rich White Girls", and "Dennis Rodman" (featuring Dennis Rodman). The duo's self-titled debut full-length album was released on March 24, 2017, and featured appearances from Soren Bryce, G-Eazy, Cyhi The Prynce, Snooze God, Spark Master Tape, and Rodman.

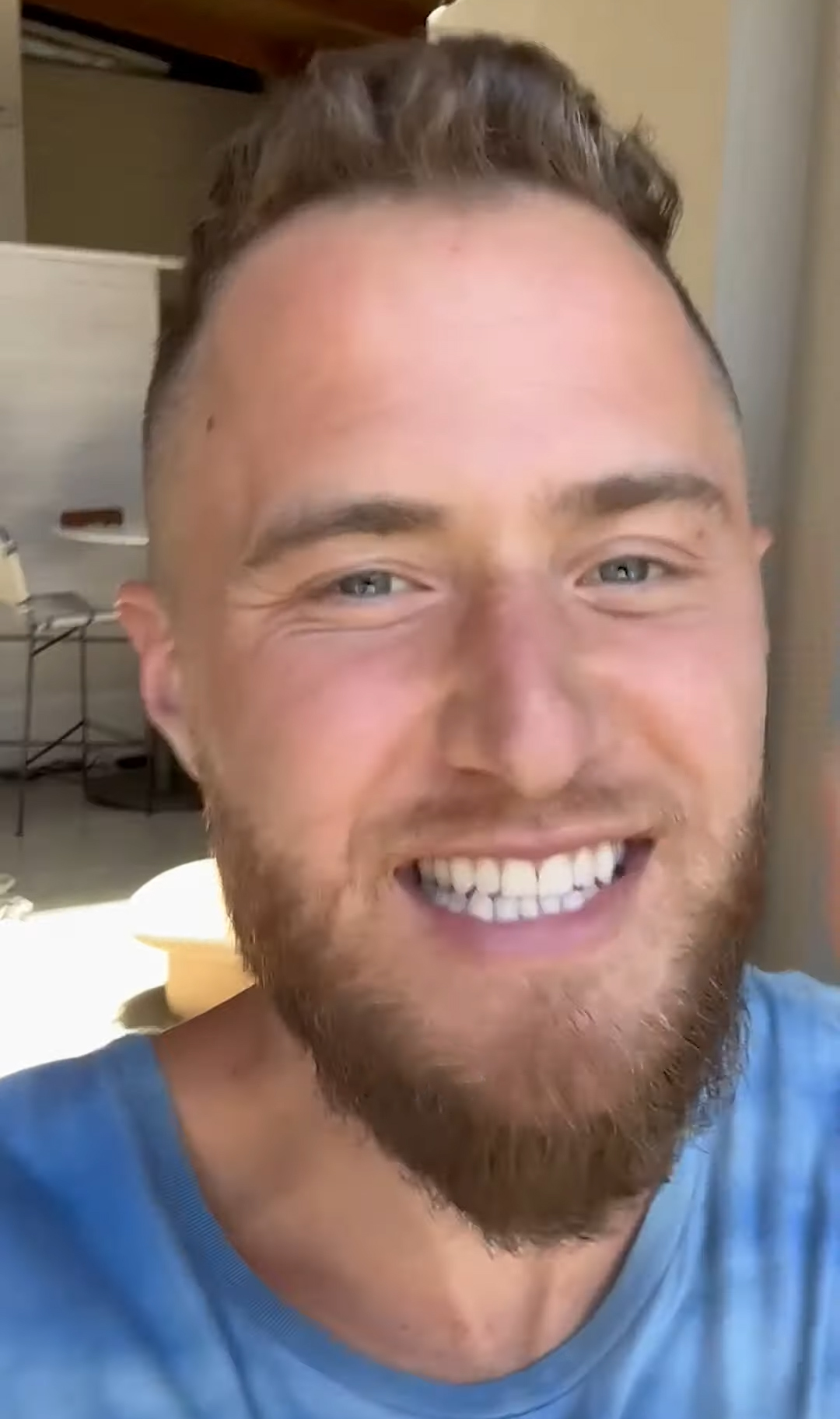
Posner in 2023

Posner was featured on Nick Jonas' 2017 single "Remember I Told You", the second collaboration between Posner and Jonas. The track also featured English singer Anne-Marie. On January 22, 2018, Posner announced a poetry album entitled I was born in detroit on a very, very, very, very, very, very, very cold day, which was released on January 26, 2018. In September 2018, he released "Song About You", the lead single from his third studio album, A Real Good Kid; the album was released on January 18, 2019. He released a fourth mixtape, Keep Going, on October 9, 2019, to commemorate his trek across the country. On December 18, 2020, he released his fourth studio album, a rap-opera type album titled Operation: Wake Up.

=== 2022–present: The Beginning ===
Mike Posner released his fifth studio album, The Beginning, on February 21, 2025. Described by Posner as a “reclamation of self” and a journey of transforming pain into joy, the album delves into themes of spiritual growth and resilience while celebrating life's beauty amid challenges. The album features 13 tracks, including singles such as “I’m Not Dead Yet,” released on September 23, 2022, which reflects on Posner's near-death experience during his ascent of Mount Everest; “Beautiful Day,” released on September 9, 2024, an ode to gratitude and survival; and “Beautiful Day (Acoustic),” an intimate version of the single released on October 18, 2024. Most recently, Posner released “Is It Just Me?,” an ethereal and psychedelic pop track about the cosmic nature of falling in love on January 24, 2025.

In March 2026, he released the single "I Went Back To Ibiza," which serves as a reflective follow-up to his 2015 hit "I Took a Pill in Ibiza".

== Personal life ==
On January 4, 2019, Posner announced that starting on March 1, 2019, he would begin a walk across America, with a support tour bus, indicating that the journey would take "most of my 31st year." He received a significant amount of press and fandom surrounding the walk, including an interview on CBS This Morning. On April 15, 2019, he set out from Asbury Park, New Jersey to begin the 3,000+ mile trip across the country. On August 7, his walk was delayed a few weeks after he was bitten by a rattlesnake in Colorado and airlifted to a local hospital. He finished his walk across the US on October 18, 2019, in Venice Beach in Los Angeles. He traveled more than 2,800 miles in the six-month trip.

On March 6, 2020, Posner endorsed Bernie Sanders for president in the 2020 Democratic Party presidential primaries. In May 2021, Posner traveled to Nepal although a US State Department travel advisory warned people of a massive COVID-19 outbreak in the country. In Nepal, he traveled to the base camp of Mount Everest and sang for climbers in the midst of a localized COVID-19 outbreak at base camp. He was described in Outside as "flaunt[ing] the rules with abandon" and being part of "a major super-spreader event". On June 1, 2021, at 4:35am, he summited Mount Everest with a team composed of guide Jon Kedrowski and two Sherpas (locals who serve as porters and guides) Dawa Chirring Sherpa and Dawa Dorje Sherpa. Posner used his climb to raise $250,000 for the Detroit Justice Center.

In January 2024, Posner announced he was Christian.

On July 28, 2025, Posner began hiking the Continental Divide Trail — a 3,100-mile route from Canada to Mexico — alongside Dr. Jon Kedrowski, who previously guided him on his 2021 Mount Everest climb. The project, informally known as The Long F*cking Walk, follows the Rocky Mountains and is being documented through Posner's social media channels.

== Discography ==
- 31 Minutes to Takeoff (2010)
- At Night, Alone. (2016)
- A Real Good Kid (2019)
- Operation: Wake Up (2020)
- The Beginning (2025)

== Concert tours ==
Headlining

- Warped Tour (2010)
- Up in the Air Tour (2010)
- The Layover Tour (2011–12)
- Unplugged Tour (2014)
- The Legendary Mike Posner Band Tour (2015–17)

Promotional

- European Tour (2011)
- MTVU VMA Tour (2011)

Opening act

- Believe Tour (Justin Bieber) (2013)
- Warrior Tour (Kesha) (2013)
- Future Now Tour (Demi Lovato and Nick Jonas) (2016)

== Awards and nominations ==
Year	Award	Category	Nominee	Result	Ref.
2010	Z Awards	Best New Artist	Himself	Nominated	
2010	MTV Europe Music Awards	Best Push Act	Himself	Nominated	
2016	MTV Video Music Award	Best Electronic Video	"I Took a Pill in Ibiza"	Nominated	
2016	MTV Europe Music Awards	Best Song	"I Took a Pill in Ibiza"	Nominated	
2017	Grammy Awards	Song of the Year	"I Took a Pill in Ibiza"	Nominated	
2017	iHeartRadio Music Awards	Dance Song of the Year	"I Took a Pill in Ibiza"	Nominated	
2017	iHeartRadio Music Awards	Best Music Video	"I Took a Pill in Ibiza"	Nominated	
