= Cher Lloyd discography =

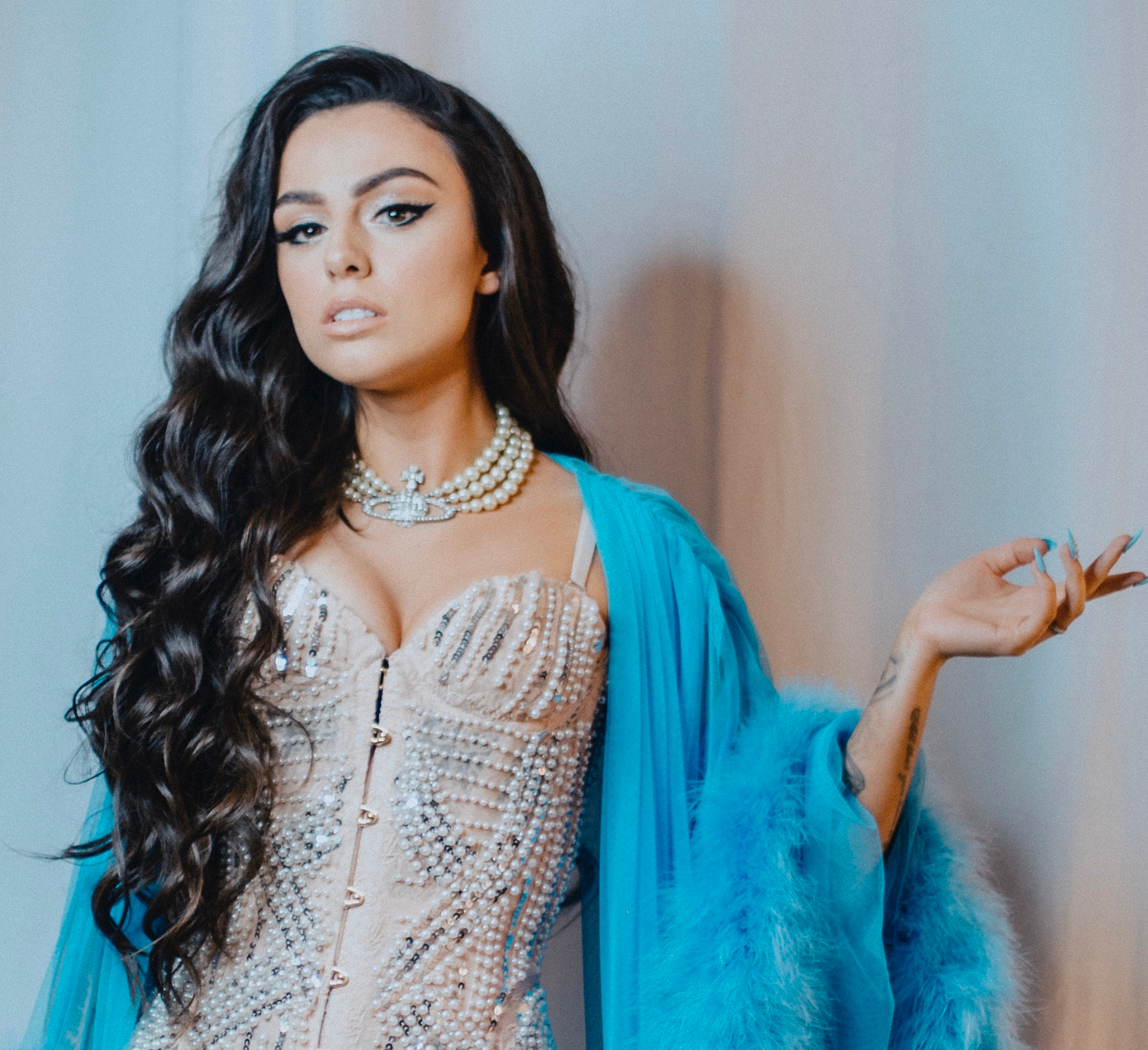
- Lloyd in 2020
- Studio albums: 2
- Singles: 12
- Music videos: 17
- Promotional singles: 8
- Featured singles: 5

The discography of English singer Cher Lloyd consists of two studio albums, ten singles, five featured singles, and eight promotional singles.

Lloyd rose to fame in 2010 when she participated in reality TV series The X Factor, to which she finished in fourth place. Shortly afterward, Lloyd was signed by Simon Cowell to Sony Records subsidiary Syco Music, releasing her debut single "Swagger Jagger" in June 2011. "Swagger Jagger" entered at number one on the UK Singles Chart and number two on the Irish Singles Chart. Her second single "With Ur Love" was released on 31 October, featuring Mike Posner, and reached number four in the UK, and number five in Ireland, preceding her debut album Sticks + Stones, which reached number four on the UK Albums Chart and number seven on the Irish Albums Chart. "Want U Back", featuring American rapper Astro, served as the album's third single and was released on 13 February 2012.

== Studio albums ==
Title	Album details	Peak chart positions											Certifications
Title	Album details	UK	AUS	BEL	CAN	IRE	JPN	NZ	SCO	SPA	NL	US	Certifications
Sticks + Stones	Released: 4 November 2011; Label: Syco, Epic; Format: CD, LP, digital download	4	30	—	11	7	46	31	2	—	—	9	BPI: Gold; IRMA: Platinum
Sorry I'm Late	Released: 27 May 2014; Label: Epic; Format: CD, digital download	21	23	103	16	58	83	26	24	52	94	12	
"—" denotes releases that did not chart or were not released in that territory.

== Singles ==
=== As lead artist ===
Title	Year	Peak chart positions										Certifications	Album
Title	Year	UK	AUS	BEL (UBU)	CAN	IRE	JPN	NZ	SCO	US	US Pop	Certifications	Album
"Swagger Jagger"	2011	1	—	43	—	2	5	—	1	—	—	BPI: Silver	Sticks + Stones
"With Ur Love" (featuring Mike Posner) (Note: The UK version features Mike Posner, but the US version remained a solo version)	2011	4	43	61	—	5	67	16	3	— (Note: "With Ur Love" did not enter the Billboard Hot 100, but peaked at number 1 on the Bubbling Under Hot 100 chart.)	27	BPI: Silver; ARIA: Platinum; RMNZ: Gold	Sticks + Stones
"Want U Back" (Note: The European and Australian version of "Want U Back" features US rapper Astro.)	2012	25	36	38	11	18	33	3	23	12	9	BPI: Gold; ARIA: Platinum; RIAA: 2× Platinum; RMNZ: Platinum	Sticks + Stones
"Oath" (featuring Becky G)	2012	—	58	—	58	—	—	13	—	73	30	RIAA: Gold; RMNZ: Gold	Sticks + Stones
"I Wish" (featuring T.I.)	2013	160	40	34	—	—	—	16	—	— (Note: "I Wish" did not enter the Billboard Hot 100, but peaked at number 16 on the Bubbling Under Hot 100 chart.)	—		Sorry I'm Late
"Sirens"	2014	59	—	—	—	53	—	—	20	—	—		Sorry I'm Late
"None of My Business"	2018	— (Note: "None of My Business" did not enter the UK Singles Chart, but peaked at number 62 on the UK Singles Downloads Chart.)	—	—	—	—	—	—	58	—	—		Non-album singles
"M.I.A"	2019	—	—	58	—	—	—	—	—	—	—		Non-album singles
"Lost"	2020	—	—	—	—	—	—	—	89	—	—		Non-album singles
"One Drink Away"	2020	—	—	—	—	—	—	—	—	—	—		Non-album singles
"Baddest" (with Imanbek)	2021	—	—	—	—	—	—	—	—	—	—		Non-album singles
"Head Down"	2025	— (Note: "Head Down" entered the UK Downloads Chart at number 26.)	—	—	—	—	—	—	—	—	—		TBA
"Green Light"	2025	—	—	—	—	—	—	—	—	—	—		TBA
"Sweet Devotion" (with Fuzion)	2026	—	—	—	—	—	—	—	—	—	—		TBA
"Time Feels Right" (with Niall T)	2026	—	—	—	—	—	—	—	—	—	—		TBA
"—" denotes releases that did not chart or were not released in that territory.

=== As featured artist ===
Title	Year	Peak chart positions									Certifications	Album
Title	Year	UK	BEL	CAN	GER	IRE	SCO	NZ	US	US Pop	Certifications	Album
"Heroes" (with The X Factor finalists)	2010	1	—	—	—	1	1	—	—	—	BPI: Silver	non-album singles
"Rum and Raybans" (Sean Kingston featuring Cher Lloyd)	2012	—	—	68	99	—	—	—	—	—		non-album singles
"Really Don't Care" (Demi Lovato featuring Cher Lloyd)	2014	92	13	24	—	82	50	36	26	7	BPI: Silver; IFPI NOR: Platinum; RIAA: 2× Platinum	Demi
"4U" (Joakim Molitor featuring Cher Lloyd)	2018	—	—	—	—	—	—	—	—	—		non-album single
"Don't Lose Love" (Quintino and Afsheen featuring Cher Lloyd)	2019	—	—	—	—	—	—	—	—	—		Bright Nights
"—" denotes releases that did not chart or were not released in that territory.

=== Promotional singles ===
Title	Year	Album
"Dirty Love"	2014	Sorry I'm Late
"Human"	2014	Sorry I'm Late
"Bind Your Love"	2014	Sorry I'm Late
"M.F.P.O.T.Y."	2014	Sorry I'm Late
"Activated"	2016	Non-album promotional single

== Other charted songs ==
Title	Year	Peak positions	Album
Title	Year	KOR For. Download	Album
"Killin' It"	2014	76	Sorry I'm Late

== Music videos ==
Title	Year	Director
"Swagger Jagger"	2011	Barney Steel and Mike Sharpe
"With Ur Love" (featuring Mike Posner)	2011	Barney Steel and Mike Sharpe
"Dub on the Track" (featuring Mic Righteous, Dot Rotten and Ghetts)	2011	Paris Zarcilla
"Want U Back" (featuring Astro)	2012	Parris
"Want U Back" (US version)	2012	Ciarra Pardo
"Oath" (featuring Becky G)	2012	Hannah Lux Davis
"With Ur Love" (US version)	2013	Hannah Lux Davis
"It's All Good" (featuring Ne-Yo)	2013	Vitaliy Kuzmenko
"I Wish" (featuring T.I.)	2013	Gil Green
"Sirens"	2014	Darren Craig
"Really Don't Care" (Demi Lovato featuring Cher Lloyd)	2014	Ryan Pallotta
"Activated"	2016	Cala3reeze
"None of My Business"	2018	Myles Whittingham
"M.I.A"	2019	Raja Virdi
"Lost"	2020	Raja Virdi
"One Drink Away"	2020	Raja Virdi
"Head Down"	2025	Raja Virdi
