= Just Dance 4 =

2012 video game

- North American cover art for the PlayStation 3
- Developers: Ubisoft Paris; Ubisoft Reflections; Ubisoft Bucharest; Ubisoft Pune; Ubisoft Milan
- Publisher: Ubisoft
- Series: Just Dance
- Platforms: Wii, Xbox 360, PlayStation 3, Wii U
- Release: Wii, Xbox 360, PlayStation 3: PAL: October 2, 2012; NA: October 9, 2012; Wii U: NA: November 18, 2012; PAL: November 30, 2012
- Genres: Music, rhythm
- Modes: Single-player, multiplayer

Just Dance 4 is a 2012 music rhythm game developed and published by Ubisoft as the fourth main installment of the Just Dance series. Announced at E3 2012 by Flo Rida and Aisha Tyler, it was released on the Wii, the Wii U, the PlayStation 3 (with PlayStation Move), and the Xbox 360 (with Kinect). The Wii, PlayStation Move and Kinect versions were released on October 2, 2012, in Europe and Australia and on October 9, 2012, in North America, The Wii U version was released on November 18, 2012, in North America and on November 30, 2012, in Europe and Australia, as a launch title for the console.

== Gameplay ==
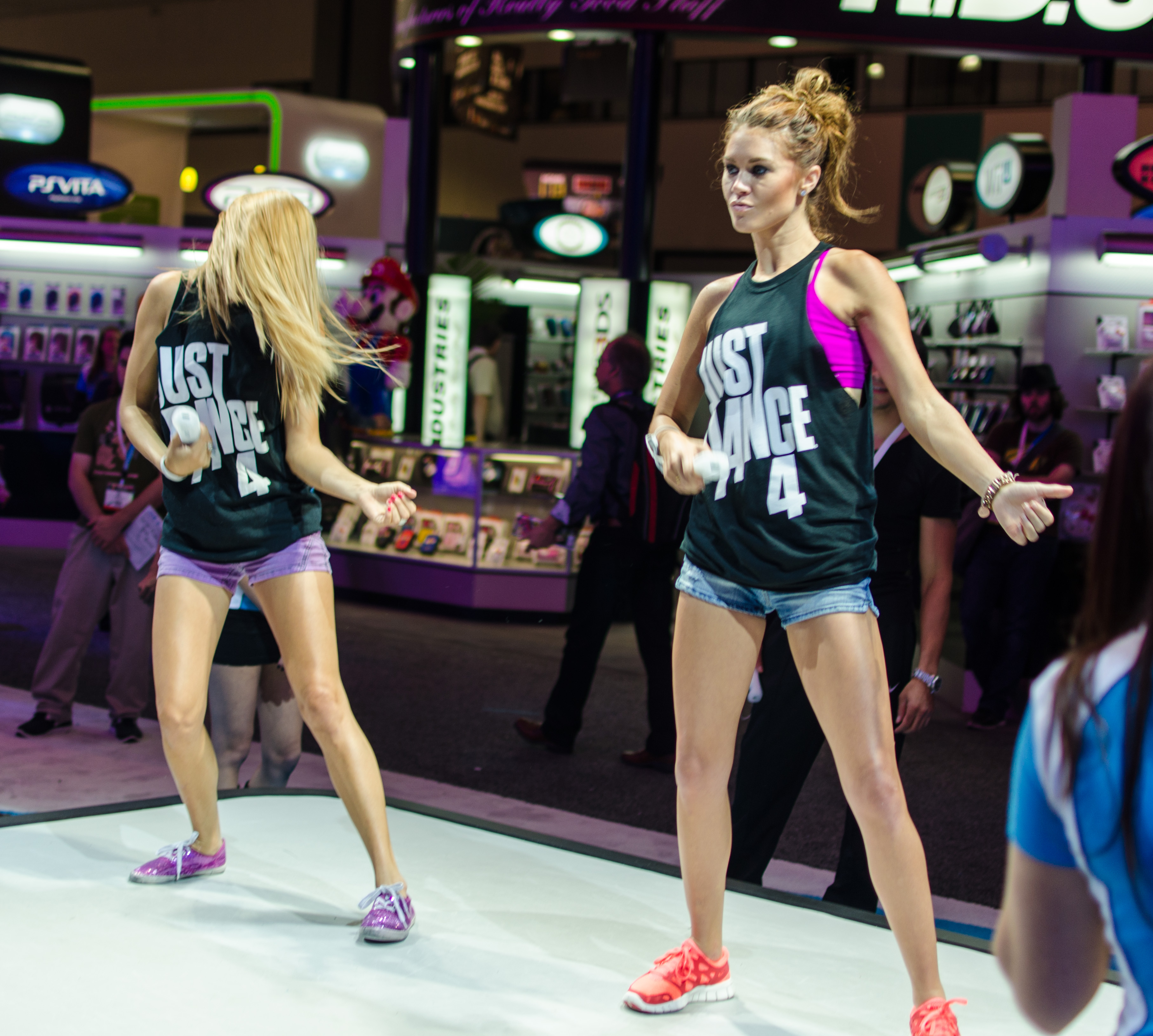
Just Dance 4 at E3 2012

The gameplay remains similar to other previous Just Dance games, as players are judged on their ability to mimic on-screen dancers performing a routine to a chosen song. Karaoke-styled lyrics have been revamped, with lyrics being highlighted in a pre-set color. New features in Just Dance 4 include dance battle routines, which allows up to two teams of two to fight as one of the two dancers from two previous songs, expansions to the game's Just Sweat mode, unlockable alternate routines for songs, and a "Puppet Master" mode exclusive to the Wii U version, which allows a player to use the Wii U GamePad to serve as a "Master" to manipulate the routine and visuals, allowing them to create their own mashups by choosing any of the four dance moves from all four entries in the Just Dance series, as well as the ability to use the "Strike A Pose" mechanic, in which players will have to match the pose shown on the screen, while the "Master" has to choose which player earn a bonus of 1,000 points or decides not to award the bonus points. Additionally, the Wii U Gamepad can also be used to draw during gameplay, as well as the option to display the lyrics on the Gamepad, and choose the next song while the current song is in progress. Previous additional modes (Simon Says Mode, Playlists, Medley, Speed-Shuffle, and Just Create (Xbox 360 only)) have been dropped, besides the "Hold My Hand" mode from the Wii and PS3 versions of Just Dance 3. Additionally, the "On Fire" motive (from mostly Goods and Perfects in a row) and effort ratings have been removed, leaving only difficulty ratings and the "Gold Move" motive, which has been dropped in Mashups. The outfits and hairstyles of the dancers are now colored in a realistic style, rather than just solid colors.

Players have "Dance Quests", six missions for each song, that can be completed. Each quest nets the player Mojo points. Downloadable songs do not have dance quests. Players can also create "Dancer Cards", which can display their favorite songs, best scores, challenges, and more. Personal leaderboards are also available for the Wii version of the game.

== Track list ==
The game features 50 songs.

Note: Several songs, including "Sexy and I Know It" by LMFAO, "Respect" by Aretha Franklin, "Weapon of Choice" by Fatboy Slim featuring Bootsy Collins, "Move Your Body" by Beyoncé, & "So Good" by B.o.B were planned to be featured in the game, but were ultimately scrapped for unknown reasons.

Song	Artist	Year
"(I've Had) The Time of My Life"	Bill Medley and Jennifer Warnes	1987
"Ain't No Other Man" (Note: Wii U exclusive)	The Girly Team (as made famous by Christina Aguilera)	2006
"Asereje (The Ketchup Song)"	Las Ketchup	2002
"Beauty and a Beat"	Justin Bieber featuring Nicki Minaj	2012
"Beware of the Boys (Mundian To Bach Ke)"	Panjabi MC	1998
"Brand New Start" (Note: Can be unlocked using the alphanumeric codes found on Cheetos packages.)	Anja	2012
"Call Me Maybe"	Carly Rae Jepsen	2012
"Can't Take My Eyes Off You"	Boys Town Gang	1982
"Cercavo Amore" (Note: PAL regions only.)	Emma	2012
"Crazy Little Thing"	Anja	2012
"Crucified"	Army of Lovers	1991
"Diggin' in the Dirt"	Stefanie Heinzmann	2012
"Disturbia"	Rihanna	2008
"Domino"	Jessie J	2011
"Everybody Needs Somebody to Love"	Dancing Bros. (as made famous by The Blues Brothers)	1980
"Good Feeling"	Flo Rida	2011
"Good Girl" (Note: NTSC only. Available as DLC for PAL regions.)	Carrie Underwood	2012
"Hit 'Em Up Style (Oops!)"	Blu Cantrell	2001
"Hot For Me"	A.K.A	2012
"I Like It"	The Blackout All-Stars	1994
"Istanbul (Not Constantinople)"	They Might Be Giants	1990
"Jailhouse Rock"	Elvis Presley	1957
"Livin' la Vida Loca"	Ricky Martin	1999
"Love You Like A Love Song"	Selena Gomez & the Scene	2011
"Make the Party (Don't Stop)" (Note: Available as DLC for NTSC Wii.)	Bunny Beatz featuring Liquid	2012
"Maneater"	Nelly Furtado	2006
"Mas Que Nada"	Sérgio Mendes featuring The Black Eyed Peas	2006
"Moves Like Jagger"	Maroon 5 featuring Christina Aguilera	2011
"Mr. Saxobeat"	Alexandra Stan	2011
"Never Gonna Give You Up"	Rick Astley	1987
"Oh No!"	Marina and the Diamonds	2010
"On The Floor"	Jennifer Lopez featuring Pitbull	2011
"Oops!... I Did It Again"	The Girly Team (as made famous by Britney Spears)	2000
"Rock Lobster"	The B-52's	1978
"Rock n' Roll (Will Take You to the Mountain)"	Skrillex	2010
"Run The Show"	Kat DeLuna featuring Busta Rhymes	2008
"So What" (Note: Also available on the Xbox 360 demo version of the game.)	P!nk	2008
"Some Catchin' Up to Do"	Sammy	2012
"Super Bass"	Nicki Minaj	2010
"Superstition"	Stevie Wonder	1972
"The Final Countdown"	Europe	1986
"Time Warp"	Halloween Thrills (as made famous by The Cast of The Rocky Horror Picture Show)	1975
"Tribal Dance"	2 Unlimited	1993
"Umbrella" (Note: Only available with the special edition on the Wii for PAL regions, but is included on the main track list otherwise.)	Rihanna featuring Jay-Z	2007
"Want U Back" (Note: Wii U exclusive, but available as DLC for the rest of the platforms.)	Cher Lloyd featuring Astro	2012
"We No Speak Americano"	Hit the Electro Beat (as made famous by Yolanda Be Cool and DCUP)	2010
"What Makes You Beautiful"	One Direction	2011
"Wild Wild West"	Will Smith	1999
"You Make Me Feel..." (Note: Can be unlocked using alphanumeric codes on Cheetos packages, but also available for download for those who haven't unlocked the Cheetos code. The DLC version of "You Make Me Feel..." has a minor adjustment, with the Cheetos mascot, Chester Cheetah, being removed.)	Cobra Starship featuring Sabi	2011
"You're the First, the Last, My Everything"	Barry White	1974

=== Downloadable content ===
==== Wii ====
DLC's for Wii were available from October 18, 2012, until the closure of the Wii Shop Channel on January 30, 2019.

Song	Artist	Year	Release Date
"Part of Me"	Katy Perry	2012	October 18, 2012
"You Make Me Feel..."	Cobra Starship featuring Sabi	2011	November 21, 2012 (PAL), January 22, 2013 (NTSC)
"Gangnam Style"	PSY	2012	November 21, 2012
"Funhouse"	Pink	2009	November 21, 2012
"Make The Party (Don't Stop)"	Bunny Beatz featuring Liquid	2012	November 21, 2012
"Dagomba"	Sorcerer	2010	November 21, 2012 (2 re-release)
"One Thing"	One Direction	2012	December 11, 2012
"Heavy Cross"	Gossip	2009	December 11, 2012
"Hit the Lights"	Selena Gomez & the Scene	2012	December 11, 2012
"So Glamorous"	The Girly Team	2012	December 11, 2012
"Want U Back"	Cher Lloyd featuring Astro	2012	December 11, 2012
"We R Who We R"	Kesha	2010	January 22, 2013
"Oath"	Cher Lloyd featuring Becky G	2012	January 22, 2013
"Boom"	Reggaeton Storm (as made famous by MC Magico and Alex Wilson)	2005	January 22, 2013 (3 re-release)
"The Lazy Song"	Bruno Mars	2010	March 5, 2013
"Gold Dust"	DJ Fresh	2010	March 5, 2013
"Professor Pumplestickle"	Nick Phoenix and Thomas J. Bergersen	2006	March 5, 2013 (2 re-release)
"Die Young"	Kesha	2012	April 2, 2013
"Primadonna"	Marina and the Diamonds	2012	April 2, 2013
"Baby Girl"	Reggaeton	2009	April 2, 2013 (2 re-release)

==== Xbox 360 ====
DLC's for Xbox 360 were also available on the Xbox Live Marketplace until its discontinuation on July 29, 2024.

Song	Artist	Year	Release Date
"Part of Me"	Katy Perry	2012	October 9, 2012
"You Make Me Feel..."	Cobra Starship featuring Sabi	2011	November 21, 2012 (PAL), January 22, 2013 (NTSC)
"Gangnam Style"	PSY	2012	November 21, 2012
"Funhouse"	Pink	2009	November 21, 2012
"Dagomba"	Sorcerer	2010	November 21, 2012 (2 re-release)
"One Thing"	One Direction	2012	December 11, 2012
"Heavy Cross"	Gossip	2009	December 11, 2012
"Hit the Lights"	Selena Gomez & the Scene	2012	December 11, 2012
"So Glamorous"	The Girly Team	2012	December 11, 2012
"Good Girl"	Carrie Underwood	2012	December 18, 2012
"Want U Back"	Cher Lloyd featuring Astro	2012	December 11, 2012
"We R Who We R"	Kesha	2010	January 22, 2013
"Oath"	Cher Lloyd featuring Becky G	2012	January 22, 2013
"Boom"	Reggaeton Storm (as made famous by MC Magico and Alex Wilson)	2005	January 22, 2013 (3 re-release)
"The Lazy Song"	Bruno Mars	2010	March 5, 2013
"Gold Dust"	DJ Fresh	2010	March 5, 2013
"Professor Pumplestickle"	Nick Phoenix and Thomas J. Bergersen	2006	March 5, 2013 (2 re-release)
"Die Young"	Kesha	2012	April 2, 2013
"Primadonna"	Marina and the Diamonds	2012	April 2, 2013
"Baby Girl"	Reggaeton	2009	April 2, 2013 (2 re-release)

==== PS3 ====
DLC's for PS3 are region locked (e.g., DLC's bought from US PSN Store will not work on a Region 3 disc).

Song	Artist	Year	Release Date
"Part of Me"	Katy Perry	2012	October 23, 2012
"You Make Me Feel..."	Cobra Starship featuring Sabi	2011	October 23, 2012 (PAL), January 29, 2013 (NTSC)
"Gangnam Style"	PSY	2012	November 27, 2012
"Funhouse"	Pink	2009	November 27, 2012
"Dagomba"	Sorcerer	2010	November 27, 2012 (2 re-release)
"One Thing"	One Direction	2012	December 18, 2012
"Heavy Cross"	Gossip	2009	December 18, 2012
"Hit the Lights"	Selena Gomez & the Scene	2012	December 18, 2012
"So Glamorous"	The Girly Team	2012	December 18, 2012
"Good Girl"	Carrie Underwood	2012	December 18, 2012
"Want U Back"	Cher Lloyd featuring Astro	2012	December 18, 2012
"We R Who We R"	Kesha	2010	January 22, 2013
"Oath"	Cher Lloyd featuring Becky G	2012	January 22, 2013
"Boom"	Reggaeton Storm (as made famous by MC Magico and Alex Wilson)	2005	January 22, 2013 (3 re-release)
"The Lazy Song"	Bruno Mars	2010	March 5, 2013
"Gold Dust"	DJ Fresh	2010	March 5, 2013
"Professor Pumplestickle"	Nick Phoenix and Thomas J. Bergersen	2006	March 5, 2013 (2 re-release)
"Die Young"	Kesha	2012	March 29, 2013 (NTSC), April 2, 2013 (PAL)
"Primadonna"	Marina and the Diamonds	2012	March 29, 2013 (NTSC), April 2, 2013 (PAL)
"Baby Girl"	Reggaeton	2009	March 29, 2013 (NTSC), April 2, 2013 (PAL) (2 re-release)

==== Wii U ====
DLC's on Wii U were only available in the Nintendo eShop until its closure on March 27, 2023.

Song	Artist	Year	Release Date
"Part of Me"	Katy Perry	2012	January 3, 2013 (PAL), January 24, 2013 (NTSC)
"Gangnam Style"	PSY	2012	January 3, 2013 (PAL), January 24, 2013 (NTSC)
"Funhouse"	Pink	2009	January 3, 2013 (PAL), January 24, 2013 (NTSC)
"So Glamorous"	The Girly Team	2012	January 3, 2013 (PAL), January 24, 2013 (NTSC)
"One Thing"	One Direction	2012	February 15, 2013
"Heavy Cross"	Gossip	2009	February 15, 2013
"Hit the Lights"	Selena Gomez & the Scene	2012	February 15, 2013
"Dagomba"	Sorcerer	2010	February 15, 2013 (2 re-release)
"Good Girl"	Carrie Underwood	2012	February 15, 2013
"We R Who We R"	Kesha	2010	February 21, 2013
"You Make Me Feel..."	Cobra Starship featuring Sabi	2011	February 21, 2013
"Oath"	Cher Lloyd featuring Becky G	2012	February 21, 2013
"Boom"	Reggaeton Storm (as made famous by MC Magico and Alex Wilson)	2005	February 21, 2013 (3 re-release)
"The Lazy Song"	Bruno Mars	2010	March 7, 2013
"Gold Dust"	DJ Fresh	2010	March 7, 2013
"Die Young"	Kesha	2012	April 18, 2013
"Primadonna"	Marina and the Diamonds	2012	April 18, 2013

Note: "You Make Me Feel..." is only available as DLC if it has not already been unlocked with a Cheetos code of the exclusive, which had a minor adjustment between the two versions, as the Cheetos mascot, Chester Cheetah, was shown on the Cheetos version, and not on the DLC version.

== Reception ==
Reception

Aggregate scores
Aggregator	Score
GameRankings	77.00% (PS3); 75.40% (X360); 72.50% (Wii); 67.64% (WiiU)
Metacritic	77/100 (PS3); 77/100 (X360); 74/100 (Wii); 66/100 (WiiU)

Review scores
Publication	Score
GameSpot	7.5/10
GamesRadar+	3/5
IGN	5.3/10
Digital Spy	4/5
Hardcore Gamer	4/5

Upon release, Just Dance 4 received positive reviews from video game publications. At the review aggregate websites GameRankings and Metacritic, the Wii U version of the game holds an average review score of 67.64% and 66 out of 100 respectively, the Wii version of the game holds an average review score of 72.50% and 74 out of 100 respectively, the Xbox 360 version of the game holds an average review score of 75.40% and 77 out of 100 respectively, and the PlayStation 3 version of the game holds an average review score of 77.00% and 77 out of 100 respectively.

== Awards and nominations ==
Year	Award	Category	Recipient	Result	Ref.
2013	Kids' Choice Awards	Favorite Video Game	Just Dance 4	Won	
2013	British Academy of Film and Television	Best Family Game	Just Dance 4	Nominated	
2013	16th Annual D.I.C.E. Awards	Family Game of the Year	Just Dance 4	Nominated	
