= Sticks and Stones (Cher Lloyd album) =

Sticks + Stones
- Standard international cover

Studio album by Cher Lloyd
- Released: 4 November 2011
- Recorded: 2011
- Studios: We the Best (Miami, Florida); Boom Boom Boom; Kite; Ealing; The Music Shed (London, United Kingdom); Old Street; Darkchild (Los Angeles, California)
- Genres: Pop; dance-pop
- Labels: Syco; Sony; Epic
- Producers: Toby Gad; Jimmy Joker; Jukebox; Max Martin; The Monarch; Johnny Powers; RedOne; The Runners; Kevin Rudolf; Eric Sanicola; Shellback; Shakespears Sister; Chris Thomas; Chris "Tek" O'Ryan

Cher Lloyd chronology
Sticks + Stones (2011)	Sorry I'm Late (2014)

Sticks and Stones
- North American album cover

Singles from Sticks and Stones
- 1. "Swagger Jagger" Released: 29 July 2011; 2. "With Ur Love" Released: 30 October 2011; 3. "Want U Back" Released: 3 February 2012; 4. "Oath" Released: 2 October 2012

Sticks and Stones (Note: For its European release, the album's title is stylised as Sticks + Stones, while for its American release, it is stylised as Sticks & Stones.) is the debut studio album by English singer Cher Lloyd. It was released on 4 November 2011, through Syco and Sony Music; American version of the record was released through Epic Records. Lloyd co-wrote five songs and worked with various producers and songwriters for her first full-length release, including the Runners, Kevin Rudolf, and Savan Kotecha, among others.

Described by Lloyd as a "jukebox", Sticks and Stones is a pop and dance-pop album. It was preceded by the lead single "Swagger Jagger", which peaked at number two on the Irish Singles Chart and topped the Scottish and the UK Singles Chart. "With Ur Love", the second single, became Lloyd's second consecutive top five single in both countries peaking at number four and five in the United Kingdom and Ireland. "Want U Back" featuring American rapper Astro and "Oath", were released as the album's third and fourth single in 2012.

Sticks + Stones debuted at number four in the United Kingdom, selling 55,668 copies in its first week, and at number nine in the United States, selling around 33,000 copies. The album received mixed reviews from music critics.

== Background and marketing ==
After the final of the seventh series of The X Factor, Lloyd signed a record deal with English businessman Simon Cowell's label Syco Music. In the United States, she signed with Epic Records, and the album's US version was released through the label. American songwriter Autumn Rowe and Moroccan-Swedish producer RedOne were soon rumoured to be working on Lloyd's debut studio album.

On 28 July 2011, Lloyd previewed five tracks from the album during an Ustream session, including tracks featuring musicians Busta Rhymes, Mike Posner, Ghetts, Mic Righteous, and Dot Rotten. Described as "jukebox" by her, Sticks + Stones was promoted by her first headlining concert Sticks and Stones Tour, which began in March 2012 and visitied various venues across the United Kingdom. In September 2012, Lloyd announced that she would release the 21 track deluxe edition; it contains "Oath" featuring Becky G, "Behind the Music", and a studio version of her cover of duo Shakespears Sister's song "Stay". "Dub on the Track", featuring Mic Righteous, Dot Rotten, and Ghetts, received a music video on 13 December.

=== Singles ===
Four singles were released from Sticks + Stones. (Note: "Want U Back" and "Oath" were promoted as the first and second single from the album's US version, respectively.) On 15 June 2011, the lead single "Swagger Jagger" was leaked onto the internet and was released on 29 July. In the United Kingdom, it reached number one in the UK Singles Chart on 7 August, being certicified silver by British Phonographic Industry (BPI) on 13 July 2022. Released on 28 October 2011, the album's second single "With Ur Love" features vocals from American singer Mike Posner. It peaked at number five in Ireland, number four in the United Kingdom and number three in Scotland. Its US version's music video was filmed and released through her YouTube channel.

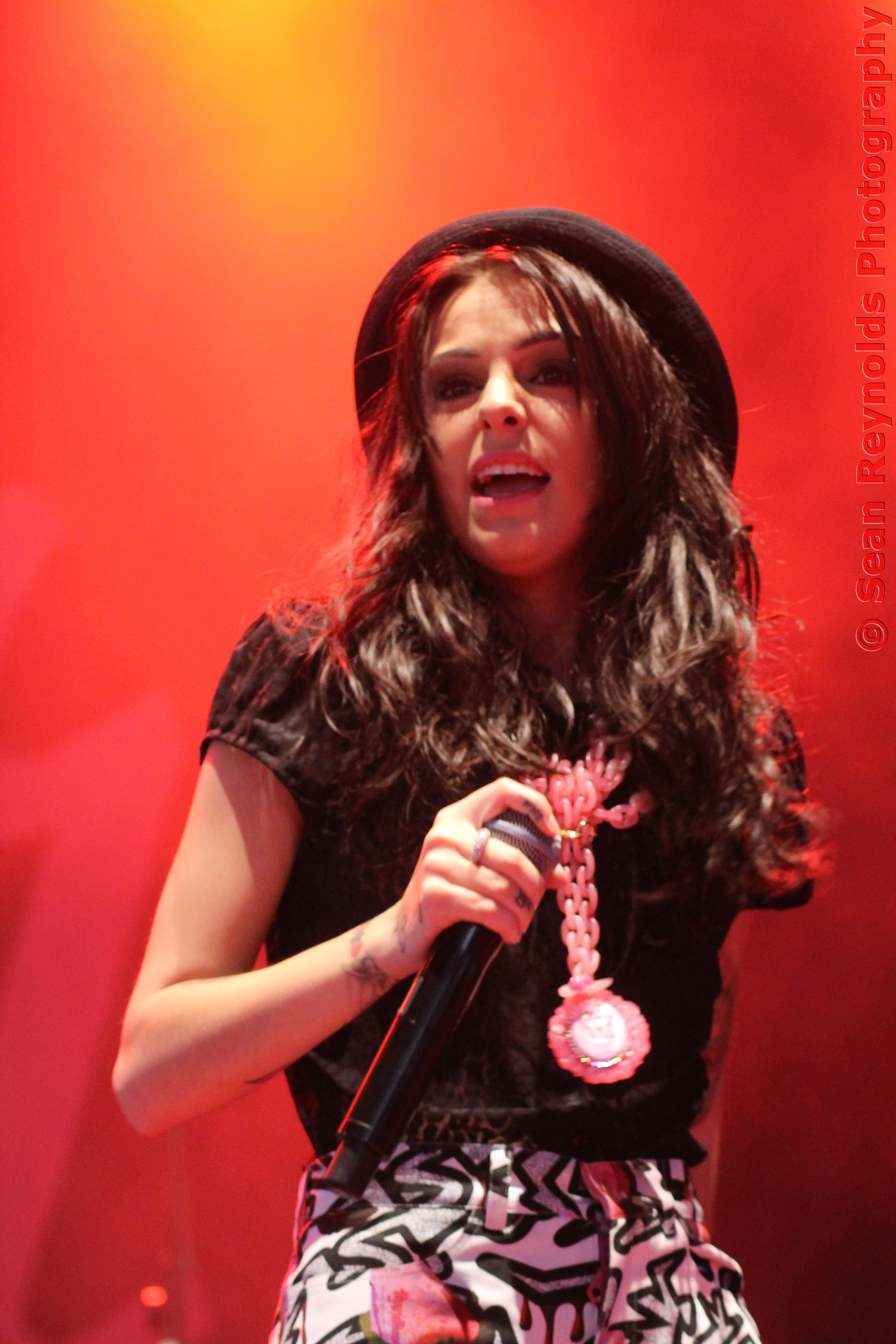
Lloyd in 2012

"Want U Back" was chosen as the third single of Sticks + Stones, being released on 3 February 2012. While the British single version of the song features vocals from American rapper Astro, its US version includes vocals from Lloyd only, and a remix features American rapper Snoop Dogg's vocals. Its music video was directed by Parris. The song sold around 2,000,000 copies, being certified double-platinum by the Recording Industry Association of America (RIAA). "Oath", produced by American producer Dr. Luke and Canadian producer Cirkut, was released on 2 October; it served as the fourth single of UK edition and second single of the US edition. It features vocals from American rapper Becky G, who originally wrote the song. The single sold around 500,000 copies in the United States, being certified Gold by RIAA.

== Critical reception ==
Professional ratings
Aggregate scores
Source	Rating
Metacritic	51/100
Review scores
Source	Rating
4Music	3/5 stars
AllMusic	3/5 stars
Digital Spy	4/5 stars
Entertainment Weekly	B
The Guardian	3/5 stars
Idolator	3.5/5 stars
MuuMuse	4/5 stars
NME	2.5/5 stars
The Observer	3/5 stars
Virgin Media	4/5 stars

Critical reception for Sticks + Stones has been mixed. At Metacritic, which assigns a normalised rating out of 100 to reviews from mainstream critics, the album received an average score of 51, based on 8 reviews, indicating "mixed or average reviews".

Several critics commented on Lloyd's vocal presence and pop appeal. BBC Music described her vocals as having a "natural and charismatic presence throughout", ultimately characterising Sticks + Stones as "a sassy, splashy modern pop album that's much better than its dodgy lead single". Entertainment Weekly echoed this focus on Lloyd herself, writing that her "manic lowbrow sass" could feel "tiresome at length" but was effective on singles such as "Want U Back", and adding that she had "enough charisma for both sides of the Atlantic".

Other reviewers highlighted the album's pop songwriting and individual tracks. Digital Spy identified "Want U Back", "With Ur Love", "Playa Boi" and "Grow Up" as tracks "worthy of downloading", while praising "Dub on the Track" as being "loaded with attitude that few could pull off". Virgin Media focused on the album's energy and cohesion, describing it as "sparky and restless" and commending its quick run of polished pop songs.

Some critics expressed reservations about the album's originality and stylistic choices. AllMusic argued that Lloyd was most compelling when she "stops trying so hard", citing "Want U Back" and "End Up Here" as "infectious examples of cutesy pure pop" that recalled Britney Spears. The review also suggested that parts of the album felt overly calculated, warning that its close adherence to contemporary pop trends could render it dated. NME criticised tracks such as "Grow Up" and "Swagger Jagger", but stated that when the album eased its more aggressive stylistic elements, there was evidence that Lloyd was "actually quite good at this pop malarkey", highlighting "Want U Back" and "End Up Here". Glamour emphasised the album's radio-ready dance-pop sound, describing it as "harmless and infectious", and singled out "Oath" and "Behind the Music" for particular praise.

== Commercial performance ==
In the United Kingdom, Stick + Stones entered the UK Albums Chart at number four behind new releases of Susan Boyle, Florence and the Machine and Michael Bublé, selling 55,668 copies in its opening week. As of September 2013, it was certified Gold by BPI for shipments of 100,000 copies. Sticks and Stones debuted at number nine with 31,000 copies sold in the United States, on the chart dated 20 October 2012. It also debuted at number seven in Ireland.

== Track listing ==
Standard edition
No.	Title	Writer(s)	Producer(s)	Length
1.	"Grow Up" (featuring Busta Rhymes)	Cher Lloyd; Kevin Rudolf; Jacob Kasher; Savan Kotecha; Andrew Harr; Jermaine Jackson; Trevor Smith	Rudolf; The Runners	3:00
2.	"Want U Back"	Kotecha; Shellback	Shellback	3:34
3.	"With Ur Love" (featuring Mike Posner)	Shellback; Max Martin; Kotecha; Mike Posner	Shellback	3:45
4.	"Swagger Jagger"	Lloyd; Autumn Rowe; Jackson; Harr; The Monarch; Marcus Lomax; Clarence Coffee Jr.	The Runners; The Monarch^{[a]}	3:12
5.	"Beautiful People" (featuring Carolina Liar)	Chad Wolfinbarger; Alexander Kronlund; Tom Hamilton	Shellback; Martin	3:31
6.	"Playa Boi"	RedOne; AJ Junior; Johnny Powers; Neneh Cherry; Cameron McVey; James Philip Morgan; Philip Ramocon	RedOne; Johnny Powers	2:52
7.	"Superhero"	Priscilla Renea; Jackson; Gerald Martin; Formetta Gibson	Jukebox	3:28
8.	"Over the Moon"	Lloyd; Kotecha; RedOne; Junior; Bilal Hajji; Eric Sanicola	RedOne; Sanicola; Jimmy Joker	2:58
9.	"Dub on the Track" (featuring Mic Righteous, Dot Rotten and Ghetts)	Lloyd; Livvi Franc; Toby Gad	Gad; TMS^{[a]}	3:53
10.	"End Up Here"	Lloyd; Ronald Jackson	Jukebox	3:30
Total length:				33:41

UK website bonus track
No.	Title	Writer(s)	Producer(s)	Length
11.	"Stay"	Siobhan Fahey; Marcella Detroit; Jean Guiot	Shakespears Sister; Chris Thomas	3:10
Total length:				36:49

UK iTunes Store bonus content
No.	Title	Length
11.	"Behind the Scenes Photo Shoot"	5:04
12.	"With Ur Love" (featuring Mike Posner) (music video)	3:48

North American version
No.	Title	Writer(s)	Producer(s)	Length
1.	"Want U Back"	Kotecha; Shellback	Shellback	3:34
2.	"Grow Up" (featuring Busta Rhymes)	Lloyd; Rudolf; Kasher; Kotecha; Harr; Jackson; Smith	Rudolf; The Runners	3:00
3.	"With Ur Love"	Shellback; Martin; Kotecha	Shellback	3:22
4.	"Behind the Music"	Jon Levine; Anjulie Persaud	Levine; Mike Flynn^{[a]}	3:42
5.	"Oath" (featuring Becky G)	Rebbeca Gomez; Lukasz Gottwald; Ammar Malik; Daniel Omelio; Henry Walter; Emily Wright	Dr Luke; Cirkut; Robopop; Chris O'Ryan^{[b]}	3:38
6.	"Swagger Jagger"	Lloyd; Rowe; Jackson; Harr; Monarch; Lomax; Coffee Jr.	The Runners; The Monarch^{[a]}	3:12
7.	"Beautiful People" (featuring Carolina Liar)	Wolfinbarger; Kronlund; Hamilton	Shellback; Martin	3:31
8.	"Playa Boi"	RedOne; Junior; Powers; Cherry; McVey; Morgan; Ramocon	RedOne; Johnny Powers	2:52
9.	"Superhero"	Renea; Jackson; Martin; Gibson	Jukebox	3:28
10.	"End Up Here"	Lloyd; Jackson	Jukebox	3:30

North American LP release^{[c]}
No.	Title	Writer(s)	Producer(s)	Length
9.	"Dub on the Track"	Lloyd; Franc; Gad	Gad; TMS^{[a]}	3:16

North American iTunes Store bonus track
No.	Title	Writer(s)	Producer(s)	Length
11.	"Riot!"	Jon Levine; Ali Tamposi; Frankie Storm; Marissa Jack	Levine	3:05
Total length:				36:55

US website bonus track
No.	Title	Writer(s)	Producer(s)	Length
11.	"Want U Back" (featuring Snoop Dogg)	Kotecha; Shellback; Calvin Broadus Jr.	Shellback	3:44

Target bonus tracks
No.	Title	Writer(s)	Producer(s)	Length
11.	"Talkin' That"	Lloyd; Harr; Lomax; Rowe; Jackson; Clarence Coffee Jr.	The Runners; The Monarch^{[a]}	3:20
12.	"Over the Moon"	Lloyd; Kotecha; RedOne; Junior; Hajji; Sanicola	RedOne; Sanicola; Joker	2:59

Japanese bonus tracks
No.	Title	Writer(s)	Producer(s)	Length
13.	"Swagger Jagger" (Dillon Francis remix)	Lloyd; Rowe; Jackson; Harr; Monarch; Lomax; Coffee Jr.	The Runners; The Monarch; Francis	5:06
14.	"Swagger Jagger" (Wideboys radio edit)	Lloyd; Rowe; Jackson; Harr; Monarch; Lomax; Coffee Jr.	The Runners; The Monarch; Wideboys	3:03
15.	"Want U Back" (featuring Snoop Dogg)	Kotecha; Shellback; Broadus Jr.	Shellback	3:44
16.	"Want U Back" (acoustic)	Kotecha; Shellback	Shellback	3:28

Japanese iTunes Store bonus track
No.	Title	Writer(s)	Producer(s)	Length
17.	"Riot!"	Levine; Tamposi; Storm; Jack	Levine	3:05

=== Notes ===
- "Playa Boi" interpolates portions of the composition entitled "Buffalo Stance" by Neneh Cherry.
- "Swagger Jagger" interpolates melodic portions of the composition entitled "Oh My Darling Clementine".
- "Behind the Music" is a cover of "Stand Behind the Music" by Anjulie.
- ^{^[a]} signifies a co-producer.
- ^{^[b]} signifies a vocal producer.
- ^{^[c]} "Oath" does not appear on the North American LP edition of Sticks & Stones, so the original tracks six through nine are renumbered one position earlier.

== Personnel ==
Credits were adapted from the album's liner notes.

Recording locations

- We the Best Studio; Miami, Florida (4)
- Boom Boom Boom (7)
- Kite Studios (9)
- Ealing Studios (9)
- The Music Shed; London, United Kingdom (9)
- Old Street Studios (9)
- Darkchild Studios; Los Angeles, California (10)

== Charts ==
=== Weekly charts ===
Weekly chart performance
Chart (2011–12)	Peak position
Australian Albums (ARIA)	30
Canadian Albums (Billboard)	11
Japanese Albums (Oricon)	46
New Zealand Albums (RMNZ)	31
Scottish Albums (Official Charts)	2
Irish Albums (IRMA)	7
UK Albums (Official Charts)	4
US Billboard 200	9
US Digital Albums (Billboard)	6

=== Year-end charts ===
Year-end chart performance
Chart (2011)	Position
UK Albums (OCC)	62

== Certifications ==
List of certifications and sales
Region	Certification	Certified units/sales
Ireland (IRMA)	Gold	7,500^{^}
United Kingdom (BPI)	Gold	233,302
^{^} Shipments figures based on certification alone.

== Release history ==
List of release dates and formats
Region	Date	Format	Edition	Label	Ref.
Australia	4 November 2011	CD; digital download; streaming	Standard	Syco; Sony	
New Zealand	4 November 2011	CD; digital download; streaming	Standard	Syco; Sony	
Japan	4 November 2011	CD; digital download; streaming	Standard	Syco; Sony	
Sweden	7 November 2011	CD; digital download; streaming	Standard	Syco; Sony	
South Africa	7 November 2011	CD; digital download; streaming	Standard	Syco; Sony	
United Kingdom	7 November 2011	CD; digital download; streaming	Standard	Syco; Sony	
United States	25 September 2012	Vinyl	Standard	Syco; Epic; Sony	
United States	2 October 2012	CD; digital download; streaming	Standard; deluxe	Syco; Epic; Sony	
Australia	5 October 2012	CD; digital download; streaming	Standard	Syco; Sony	
New Zealand	5 October 2012	CD; digital download; streaming	Standard	Syco; Sony	
Japan	24 October 2012	CD; digital download; streaming	Deluxe	Syco; Sony	
