= Lost (Cher Lloyd song) =

2020 single by Cher Lloyd

Single by Cher Lloyd
- Released: 24 April 2020
- Length: 2:55
- Label: Universal; Polydor
- Songwriters: Raphaella; Casey Smith; Patrick Jordan-Patrikios; Boy Matthews; Youthonix; Cher Lloyd
- Producer: Hitimpulse

Cher Lloyd singles chronology
"M.I.A" (2019)	"Lost" (2020)	"One Drink Away" (2020)

Music video
- "Lost" on YouTube

"Lost" is a song by English singer Cher Lloyd. It was released on 24 April 2020, through Polydor Records under Universal Music Group. An accompanying video directed by Raja Virdi was released on the same day.

== Background and production ==
After releasing her second album, Sorry I'm Late (2014), Lloyd went on a musical hiatus. She released "None of My Business" in October 2018 and "M.I.A" in October 2019, through Polydor Records and Universal Music Germany. Several months later, she began teasing then-upcoming single "Lost" for a week before being released in April.

A week prior to the release of "Lost", Lloyd expressed strong anticipation for the track, noting her excitement amid growing fan expectation. She said she was "just so excited" about the release, explaining that although she initially questioned whether it was "the right time" to put out new music, she ultimately concluded that music was, alongside her family and friends, "the only thing [...] that is keeping me going" during lockdown. She added that she believed many listeners felt similarly and hoped that continuing to create and release music would offer fans "that message of empowerment".

"Lost" was written by Lloyd along with Raphaella, Casey Smith, Patrick Jordan-Patrikios, Boy Matthews and Youthonix, while it was mixed, mastered by Lex Barkey, and produced by Hitimpulse.

== Music video ==
The music video for "Lost" premiered on Lloyd's YouTube on the day of its release. Produced by Phase Films and directed by Raja Virdi who worked on "M.I.A", the video was shot in a single take with no cuts or edits made, depicting Lloyd on a bed with neon and pastel lights changing behind her as she sings. She wears a pearl-studded corset with a blue puffy sheer robe to match. She is also seen wearing a three-row Swarovski pearl Vivienne Westwood choker.

== Critical reception ==
Pip Williams writing for The Line of Best Fit stated "'Lost' is far and away the strongest release of Lloyd's career to date, blowing those who still reference 'Swagger Jagger' as a career high out of the water. The new cut sees Lloyd embrace languid balladry as a vehicle for a surprisingly hard-hitting lyric. It's still slickly produced and radio-friendly, but there's a heart and soul to it that many mainstream stars would struggle to match." Writing for The Guardian, Leonie Cooper described that "there is something heartening about this largely harmless return."

== Track listing ==
Digital download

1. "Lost" - 2:55

Digital download ("One Drink Away" Spotify B-side)

1. "One Drink Away" – 2:25
2. "Lost" – 2:55

== Personnel ==
Credits were adapted from Apple Music.

- Cher Lloyd – vocals, songwriting
- Hitimpulse – production
- Raphaella Mazaheri-Asadi – songwriting
- Hanni Ibrahim – songwriting
- Patrick Jordan-Patrikios – songwriting
- Casey Smith – songwriting
- Boy Matthews – songwriting
- Lex Barkey – studio personnel, mixing, mastering

== Charts ==
Chart (2020)	Peak position
Scotland Singles (OCC)	89

== Release history ==
Release history
Region	Date	Format	Label	Ref.
Various	24 April 2020	Digital download; streaming	Polydor; Universal	
