= Looks Like Sex =

Single by Mike Posner

from the album The Layover
- Released: December 2, 2011
- Recorded: 2011
- Genre: Synthpop, R&B
- Length: 3:24
- Songwriters: Mike Posner, Mason Levy

Mike Posner singles chronology
"With Ur Love" (2011)	"Looks Like Sex" (2011)	"Switch Lanes" (2013)

"Looks Like Sex" is a song by American recording artist Mike Posner from his third mixtape The Layover, although the version of the song on the tape is merely a snippet. It was released on December 2, 2011, in the United States. The song was written by Mike Posner and Mason Levy, but is heavily derivative of "Midnight City" by French act M83. The song did not enter the Billboard Hot 100 but peaked on the Bubbling Under Hot 100 Singles chart at number 18. A remix version by Internet cartoon band Your Favorite Martian has released on their YouTube channel. Musically, the song contains "slinky electro-pop" characteristics. It was originally intended to be on his second album, then under the name of Sky High, but once Posner stated that his album would be called Pages, he then confirmed that he started over with recording and that the single would not appear on the album.

== Critical reception ==
Scott Shelter of PopCrush gave the song 4/5 stars stating, "Every Mike Posner song seems to have an unquantifiable layer of cool, thanks to his chilled-out, almost effortless vocal delivery, and ‘Looks Like Sex’ is no exception. The catchy melody makes the track a good choice as the lead single from ‘Sky High.’" Katherine St Asaph of Popdust said the song "sounds great" and explained "as an instrumental, the single’s admirable" but criticized the lyrics, "the chorus consists entirely of “she looks like sex, sex, sex, sex.” This strikes us as a little underwritten, not to mention more than a little shameless."

== Music video ==
Posner uploaded a lyric music video on Vevo on December 6, 2011. The official music video premiered on January 9, 2012.

== Track listing ==
Digital download

1. "Looks Like Sex" - 3:24

== Chart performance ==
Chart (2011–12)	Peak position
Austria (Ö3 Austria Top 40)	42
Belgium (Ultratip Bubbling Under Flanders)	2
Belgium (Ultratip Bubbling Under Wallonia)	4
US Bubbling Under Hot 100 Singles (Billboard)	18
US Rhythmic Airplay (Billboard)	38

== Release history ==
Country	Date	Format	Label
United States	December 2, 2011	Digital download	RCA Records
United States	December 6, 2011	Mainstream airplay	RCA Records
United Kingdom	March 4, 2012	Digital download	RCA Records
