= Computer Era =

EP by Astro
- Released: December 2, 2014
- Recorded: 2013–2014
- Genre: Hip hop
- Label: Grade A Tribe Records
- Producer: Boi-1da; brandUn DeShay; The Audible Doctor; IfeFinch; Nico Fazio; Platinum Pat; BMC Beats; GoldDigga; Sammy J

Singles from Computer Era
- 1. "Champion" Released: December 2, 2014

Computer Era is an extended play by American hip hop artist Astro, today known as Stro. The EP was released on December 2, 2014, by Grade A Tribe Records. The EP was supported by the lead single "Champion"

== Release and promotion ==
Astro premiered "Champion" on BET's 106 & Park on December 2.

== Track listing ==
No.	Title	Producer(s)	Length
1.	"Computer Era (Intro)"	The Audible Doctor	2:35
2.	"U Know" (featuring Nathaniel)	brandUn DeShay	2:31
3.	"Just Dreaming"	Boi-1da	3:05
4.	"K.I.N.G (Keeping Ignorant Niggas Glorified)" (featuring Bishop Nehru)	IfeFinch	3:24
5.	"Brother's Keeper"	Sammy J	3:00
6.	"Champion" (featuring Spade)	Platinum Pat	3:14
7.	"Acting Out" (featuring Flash Gordy)	BMC Beats	2:51
8.	"Ghetta Story"	Sammy J	2:57
9.	"Ambitions" (featuring Noelle Flores)	Sammy J	3:23
10.	"Nigga Pls"	Boi-1da	2:59
11.	"Internet Goons"	GoldDigga	3:36

Deluxe Edition Bonus Tracks
No.	Title	Producer(s)	Length
12.	"How It Goes"	Sammy J	2:37
13.	"East Coast G Funk"	Nico Fazio	2:45
