= With Ur Love =

2011 single by Cher Lloyd

Single by Cher Lloyd featuring Mike Posner

from the album Sticks + Stones
- Released: 28 October 2011
- Recorded: 2011
- Genre: Pop; bubblegum pop; R&B
- Length: 3:45 (featured versions); 3:23 (U.S. version)
- Label: Syco Music; Sony; Epic
- Songwriters: Shellback; Savan Kotecha; Max Martin; Mike Posner
- Producer: Shellback

Cher Lloyd singles chronology
"Swagger Jagger" (2011)	"With Ur Love" (2011)	"Want U Back" (2012)

Mike Posner singles chronology
"Bow Chicka Wow Wow" (2011)	"With Ur Love" (2011)	"Looks Like Sex" (2011)

Alternative cover
- North American artwork

Music video
- UK Version on YouTube; US Version on YouTube

"With Ur Love" is a song by English singer Cher Lloyd featuring vocals from American singer Mike Posner. The single was released on 28 October 2011, and was written by Shellback, Savan Kotecha, Max Martin and Posner and was produced by Shellback and Martin. Musically "With Ur Love" is a mid-tempo pop, bubblegum pop and R&B song, that lyrically speaks about the euphoria of being in love. The song debuted at number four in the United Kingdom, becoming Lloyd's second top ten single. It also reached the top ten in Ireland and the top twenty in New Zealand.

In the United States, the song was released as a solo single, without Posner’s vocals but it was released on iTunes in the US on 28 August 2012 as a promotional single from the album. Lloyd confirmed that the song would be the next US single on Today on 30 August 2012, but her label decided to maintain the song as a promotional single to support her album and announced "Oath" as the second US single instead. In January 2013, "With Ur Love" was announced as the third single from the US release, and was released for airplay on 5 February. On 16 April 2013, a remix version of the song featuring American rapper Juicy J was released digitally and to US radio airplay.

== Background and release ==
After the mixed response and the commercial success of her lead single "Swagger Jagger", Lloyd decided to release "With Ur Love" as the album's second single. Lloyd commented about the difference between the tracks: "It's very different. The two songs are miles apart. My first single showed my attitude and aggressive style, while this one is more stripped-back with me being me. It basically gives you a good insight into what the album is going to be like, so I think it was a good choice." It received its first airplay on 21 September 2011. The recording has brought comparisons to Avril Lavigne, and Lloyd herself described the track as one where she, "actually get[s] to sing instead of jumping around like an idiot." Both of the featured artists wrote their own verses. The US version does not feature Posner. The album liner notes of the US version of the album states that Posner did not co-write the solo version of the song. The German digital download features a different cover.

== Composition and recording ==
"With Ur Love" was written by Savan Kotecha, Shellback, Max Martin and Mike Posner, while production was handled by Martin and Shellback. While talking to Digital Spy's Robert Copsey, Lloyd commented about working with Max Martin, stating: "Max is a very private person. He doesn't rant and rave about his music, which is why I loved working with him. I want to be like that - I want to get my music out but not scream and shout about it." Posner commented in an interview for Digital Spy about the collaboration:

"It was a great record. I think if it does get released, I think it could have the same kind of success. Max Martin and Cher did a really strong song. During my time with Cher I worked with an incredible singer, and I don't think she gets enough credit for her singing ability as she deserves. There's no autotune on there. It's just really, really great, but I think people forget about that because she can rap so well also. I don't see why she couldn't compete in the US. She's a great artist."

== Lyrics and style ==
"With Ur Love" is a mid-tempo pop, bubblegum pop and R&B song. It begins with Lloyd singing "da da da da dum dum da dum dum", which according to The Guardian's Alexis Petridis "pinches its opening hook from Ann Peebles' I Can't Stand the Rain." Less than a minute into the song listeners are re-introduced to the concept of "swag". "I used to always think I was bulletproof/ But you got an AK and you're blowing through," Lloyd sings. Lyrically, it talks about Lloyd's feeling of "being on top of the world" with her lover. "I feel like I'm on top of the world with your love," she insists in the chorus. Posner sings "I don't even care if you sing my songs wrong", referring to when Lloyd forgot the words to "Cooler Than Me" at the Judges Houses. Bradley Stern of MuuMuse commented that the groove is reminiscent of Rihanna's "What's My Name" and "Rude Boy", while Katherine St. Asaph of Pop Dust perceived that her vocals on the song has elements of Rihanna, intermittently daubed with shades of The Cardigans' Nina Persson.

== Critical reception ==
The song received favourable reviews from music critics. Robert Copsey from Digital Spy wrote: "It's sweet and sugary with an addictively sharp edge." Nick Levine from BBC Music wrote that the song is "as easy to resist as a pie cooling on your neighbor's windowsill." Jon O'Brien from AllMusic wrote that the song "is a charming M.I.A.-inspired ditty that fuses a lolloping childlike bassline with bouncy beats and some surprisingly sugary-sweet melodies, although Mike Posner's guest rap is the pure definition of 'phoned-in'."

Joe Rivers from No Ripcord agreed, writing: "It's another good, catchy song, save for a hateful Mike Posner guest spot, which paints him to be the kind of lecherous predator you pray doesn't take your daughter to prom." Alexis Petridis of The Guardian stated: "It is a far better pop single than you might expect a former X Factor contestant to dish up." Ben Chalk from MSN Music described it as "a plaintive slice of R&B-infused pop with a big fat shiny chorus, it plays to her strengths far better." Alex Denney from NME commented:

"Another perky tune with crunkin', stutterin' beats and big doe eyes on the chorus from Cher. Also features a 'soulful' turn from Mike Posner (me neither) on the middle eight, in which he talks about getting to third base with his date — possibly Cher, but it doesn't bear thinking about too much."

== Juicy J version ==
A remixed version of the song featuring American rapper Juicy J was released on 16 April 2013 for digital download on the iTunes Store. Juicy J is not featured in the US music video, despite the remix being sent to US radio.

== Music video ==
Lloyd laughing with some friends in the music video.

=== Background and development ===
The UK version of the music video for the song was uploaded to YouTube on 5 October 2011. Lloyd filmed most of the music video for "With Ur Love" in and around Basinghall Avenue, London, England. The U.S. version of the music video was recorded at "The Hollywood Castle" on 15 January 2013 in Los Angeles, California. It was released on 14 February on VEVO.

=== Synopsis ===
==== UK version ====
Lloyd is seen laughing with some friends as she sits in a bedroom. She then goes and walks through the streets of London with her pals as giant heart-shaped balloons float along the streets and many colorful little ones are released into the air. Posner is seen singing from a rooftop with the backdrop of London's skyline behind him.

==== US version ====
In the US version of the music video, Lloyd is seen living in a large castle with her friends, who also seem to have the same supernatural powers as Lloyd. On a rainy day a couple of men are attracted to her castle and are soon invited in by Lloyd. The group sits down to a dinner together. Lloyd then puts a spell on the men for them to act more outgoing and talkative during the meal. Each of the men go to a different part of Lloyd's castle where they are seduced and enchanted by her friends. Lloyd's friends each steal essence from the men which is put in a small bottle. Lloyd and her friends put the essence in a cauldron and she casts a spell on it, which creates her ideal mate.

== Live performances ==
Lloyd performed the song on The X Factor on 30 October 2011, the day of its release in the United Kingdom. She performed "With Ur Love" along with her first single, "Swagger Jagger", on the Ukrainian X Factor on 19 November. In August 2012 it was revealed that "With Ur Love" would serve as Lloyd's third US single. Lloyd then performed the track on 30 August on Today along with "Want U Back". Lloyd performed the single live at the 2013 Radio Disney Music Awards on 27 April.

== Chart performance ==
On 4 November 2011, the song debuted at number five in Ireland, becoming Lloyd's second top ten single in the country. Despite being predicted to debut at number one in the United Kingdom by The Official Charts Company, the song entered the UK Singles Chart at number four with first-week sales of 74,030 copies. The song sold more than her first single, "Swagger Jagger" when it debuted at number one in August 2011, selling 66,316 copies. "With Ur Love" also marks the highest-selling number-four single since Rihanna's "Only Girl (In the World)", which sold 74,248 copies in October 2010. It's estimated to have sold between 300,000 and 400,000 copies in total in the UK. As a promotional single in the US, it has sold over 50,000 copies.

== Track listing ==
UK digital remixes EP
No.	Title	Length
1.	"With Ur Love" (featuring Mike Posner)	3:46
2.	"With Ur Love" (featuring Mike Posner) (Acoustic Version)	3:45
3.	"With Ur Love" (featuring Mike Posner) (Alex Gaudino and Jason Roony Remix)	6:28
4.	"With Ur Love" (featuring Mike Posner) (Digital Dog Radio Edit)	4:28
5.	"With Ur Love" (featuring Mike Posner) (Teka and SoulForce Reggae Remix)	3:48

UK CD single
No.	Title	Length
1.	"With Ur Love" (featuring Mike Posner)	3:46
2.	"With Ur Love" (featuring Mike Posner) (Acoustic Version)	3:45

US digital download
No.	Title	Length
1.	"With Ur Love"	3:23
Total length:		3:23

Juicy J version
No.	Title	Length
1.	"With Ur Love" (featuring Juicy J)	3:45
Total length:		3:45

US promo CD
No.	Title	Length
1.	"With Ur Love"	3:23
2.	"With Ur Love" (featuring Juicy J) (Clean)	3:46
3.	"With Ur Love" (featuring Juicy J) (Super Clean)	3:46
4.	"With Ur Love" (featuring Juicy J) (Explicit Main)	3:46

== Charts ==
=== Weekly charts ===
Chart (2011–2013)	Peak position
Australia (ARIA)	43
Belgium (Ultratip Bubbling Under Flanders)	11
Ireland (IRMA)	5
New Zealand (Recorded Music NZ)	16
Scottish Singles Sales (Official Charts)	3
UK Singles (Official Charts)	4
US Bubbling Under Hot 100 (Billboard)	1
US Pop Airplay (Billboard)	27
Russia Airplay (Tophit)	157

=== Year-end charts ===
Chart (2011)	Position
UK Singles (Official Charts Company)	124

== Certifications ==
Certifications for "With Ur Love"
Region	Certification	Certified units/sales
Australia (ARIA)	Platinum	70,000^{^}
New Zealand (RMNZ)	Platinum	15,000^{*}
United Kingdom (BPI)	Silver	200,000^{*}
^{*} Sales figures based on certification alone.^{^} Shipments figures based on certification alone.

== Release history ==
Country	Date	Format
Australia	28 October 2011	Digital download
New Zealand	28 October 2011	Digital download
Ireland	28 October 2011	Digital download
France	28 October 2011	Digital download
Denmark	28 October 2011	Digital download
United Kingdom	30 October 2011	Digital download
United Kingdom	31 October 2011	CD single
Germany	27 January 2012	Digital download
United States	28 August 2012	Digital download (solo version)
United States	16 April 2013	Digital download (single version)
