= M.I.A (Cher Lloyd song) =

2019 single by Cher Lloyd

Single by Cher Lloyd
- Released: 11 October 2019
- Genre: R&B
- Length: 2:37
- Label: Universal; Polydor
- Songwriters: Cher Lloyd; Gia Koka; Jeremia Jones; Morien van der Tang; Stevie Appleton
- Producers: Morien van der Tang; Faried Arween Jhauw; Hitimpulse; Joznez; Nico TheOwl

Cher Lloyd singles chronology
"Don't Lose Love" (2019)	"M.I.A" (2019)	"Lost" (2020)

Music video
- "M.I.A" on YouTube

"M.I.A" is a song by English singer Cher Lloyd. Released on 11 October 2019, through Polydor Records under Universal Music Group, the song was co-written by Lloyd, Gia Koka, Jeremia Jones, Morien van der Tang, and Stevie Appleton. Its accompanying video directed by Raja Virdi was premiered on the day of the song's release.

== Background and composition ==
Lloyd began teasing "M.I.A" on 3 October 2019, by posting several images of the acronym on her social media spelling out the title. She described it as "a mood" that was intended to capture a particular feeling, and further explained that she wanted its accompanying visuals to feel "playful, expressive and fun" and to reflect her personality. In an interview with Euphoria magazine, Lloyd stated: "The whole concept behind that song was being at a party that you really really don't want to be at, but you want to be with that person and you'd rather be anywhere else if it means that you get to be with that person." An R&B track, "M.I.A" blends elements of pop. Lyrically, the song recounts a disappointing party experience, with Lloyd inviting a romantic interest to leave and escape elsewhere together.

== Promotion ==
Lloyd embarked on a week-long radio tour in the UK from 10–17 November 2019, where she did acoustic sessions and interviews in promotion of the song. She performed the song live once at the German TV show ZDF-Fernsehgarten on 13 October 2019.

Shot at the Barbican Estate, the music video for "M.I.A" premiered on YouTube on the day of its release. It depicts Lloyd and her dancers performing in a tropical outdoor setting and a neon-lit laundromat, while wearing pieces from her recently launched clothing line. The video was produced by Phase Films and directed by Raja Virdi.

== Reception ==
Writing for Vibe, Hannah Ewens felt that "M.I.A." showcased a "more mature" side of Lloyd, suggesting that the song reinforced her place within contemporary British pop. Commercially, "M.I.A" spent for weeks on Ultratip Wallonia under top 50 chart.

== Track listing ==
Digital download / streaming

1. "M.I.A" - 2:37

Digital download / streaming (Cahill Edit)

1. "M.I.A" (Cahill Edit) - 3:00

== Personnel ==
Credits were adapted from Tidal.

- Cher Lloyd – songwriter
- Gia Koka – songwriter
- Jeremia Jones – songwriter
- Morien van der Tang – songwriter, producer, additional producer
- Stevie Appleton – songwriter
- Faried Arween Jhauw – producer, additional producer
- Hitimpulse – producer, additional producer
- Joznez – producer, mixing
- Nico TheOwl – producer
- Dave Kutch – mastering engineer
- Lex Barkey – mixing
- Paul Whalley – recording engineer

== Charts ==
Weekly chart performance
Chart (2019)	Peak position
Belgium (Ultratip Bubbling Under Wallonia)	58

== Release history ==
Release date and formats
Region	Date	Format	Version	Label	Ref.
Various	11 October 2019	Digital download; streaming	Original	Universal; Polydor	
Various	20 December 2019	Digital download; streaming	Cahill edit	Universal; Polydor	
