= Head Down (Cher Lloyd song) =

Single by Cher Lloyd
- Released: 17 January 2025
- Genre: R&B
- Length: 2:55
- Label: Cher Lloyd
- Composers: Cher Lloyd; Tom Mann; Katya Edwards; Edward Sanders
- Lyricist: Cher Lloyd
- Producer: Goldfingers

Cher Lloyd singles chronology
"Baddest" (2021)	"Head Down" (2025)	"Green Light" (2025)

Music video
- "Head Down" on YouTube

"Head Down" is a song by English singer Cher Lloyd, independently released on 17 January 2025. Lloyd co-wrote the track along with Tom Mann, Katya Edwards and Edward Sanders, while Goldfingers produced it. A personal and emotional track, the single had been compared with Jade Thirlwall's 2024 single, "Angel of My Dreams". The music video for "Head Down" was released on the same day.

== Background and release ==
In early 2025, Lloyd shared a photo of her face through Instagram, stating that she would release a new single soon. The single was revealed to be "Head Down", released on 17 January independently. When releasing the single, she wrote in caption that she was "feeling so many different emotions", stating that it was "a long road to get here".

When Lloyd was writing "Head Down", she stated that she felt relief but did not know how to express this. However, writing on paper with a pen became "therapeutic" to her, rather than speaking it. Lloyd also told BBC Newsbeat that the music was her "everything" and she was "spilling the tea" for "Head Down", revealing that she would "keep rolling the songs out". According to her, the song is "a way to do that without blurting it all out and getting in trouble".

== Composition ==
"Head Down" is a "personal" track of Lloyd, which reflects her "struggles and triumphs". According to MXDWN, it contains "introspective and chill R&B vibe". Produced by Goldfingers, the track "seemingly takes a swipe at the fickle nature of fame", as she sings, "I thought I was flying, I was falling / You know, I never saw it coming / Chew me up, spit me out, throw me back on the ground".

== Music video ==
An accompanying music video for "Head Down" premiered at Lloyd's YouTube, on the same day of the single's release. She made her fans available to join in the live chat during its premiere, to appreciate them for supporting her.

== Critical reception ==
Nmesoma Okechukwu from Euphoria magazine compared "Head Down" with Jade Thirlwall's single "Angel of My Dreams" (2024), calling it as "emotional track".

== Charts ==
Weekly chart performance
Chart (2025)	Peak position
UK Singles Sales (OCC)	28
UK Singles Downloads (OCC)	26

== Personnel ==
Credits were adapted from Tidal.

- Cher Lloyd – lead vocals, composer, lyricist
- Goldfingers – producer
- Edward Sanders – composer
- Katya Edwards – composer
- Tom Mann – composer
- Lex Barkey – mastering engineer

== Release history ==
List of release dates and formats
Region	Date	Format	Label	Ref.
Various	17 January 2025	Digital download; streaming	Self-released	
