= Activated =

2016 song by Cher Lloyd

Promotional single by Cher Lloyd
- Released: 22 July 2016
- Genre: R&B
- Length: 2:57
- Label: Vixen
- Songwriters: Cher Lloyd; Louis Bell; Whitney Phillips; Soaky Siren
- Producers: Billy McMillen; Dina Coccitello; Katie Taylor

"Activated" is a song by English singer Cher Lloyd. It was released on 22 July 2016 through Vixen Records. The song was made available to stream exclusively on Rolling Stone a day before to release (on 21 July 2016).

== Background ==
In an interview with Rolling Stone, Lloyd said about the song "I think when we first started writing 'Activated' – in the very beginning stages – I had said that I wanted a song [reflecting] exactly how I feel. [It's] this feeling that I have of just wanting to run as fast as I possibly can and just move. I wasn't going to just record something and release shit for the sake of having a song out, I wanted to feel something when I heard [it], and I wanted to feel like I did when I first started, like when I used to sing in my bedroom when I was 15."

== Critical reception ==
Idolator's Robbie Daw said "Activated is a slinkly, sassy little R&B number, complete with the commanding line 'when I do the damn thing, just watch me.'" Estelle Tang of Elle said that "Activated" has a "slinky air of mystery" and went on to say that "it's a pure feeling-yourself anthem". Writing for Rolling Stone, Angelo Kritikos called the song "fierce" and "revved-up".

Nick Barnes of UnrealityTV UK stated "Activated isn’t a song that will work for everybody – people will either love it, or they just won’t care for it. If anything, 'Activated' shows how versatile an artist Lloyd is, as it's not like any other song we’ve had from her in the past. 'Activated' does have a very mature feel to it, it feels as though Lloyd put a lot of herself into the track, and it definitely feels like she is going for an R&B feel. Having said that, it feels as though she's mashed R&B and pop together, as the chorus is more catchy pop and the verses are R&B-inspired," and went on to claim that although he enjoyed the song, he didn't see "Activated" as lead single material, claiming "when an artist has been away for just over two years like Lloyd has, I listen carefully to the first single they put out from their new album. It's almost like a first impression, and let's face it, people do say first impressions count. A lead single gives us an insight into what we could potentially expect from an album, it's a presentation of what is to come. A lead single needs to be big, it needs to be catchy, it needs to pull people in. For me, 'Activated' is not a lead single, and I just want to reassure you that is not a bad thing when I say that I don't think 'Activated' is lead single material, it's because when I listen to the song, I feel as though Cher is talking to her fans. This is a memo from Cher to her fans to say she is back and she is stronger than ever rather than a lead single for the wider world."

== Music video ==
On 24 August 2016, the music video for the song, directed by Cala3reeze, was released. The visual shows the singer in a warehouse, performing the song with background dancers and in front of several TVs as they show static. In an interview with Elle, Lloyd said "I wanted to make this video especially for my fans because while this track isn't an official single, the reaction has been so incredible that I really wanted to follow it up with something special as thanks for all the support."

== Release history ==
Region	Date	Format	Label	Ref.
Various	22 July 2016	Digital download	Vixen	
