= Cher Lloyd =

English singer (born 1993)

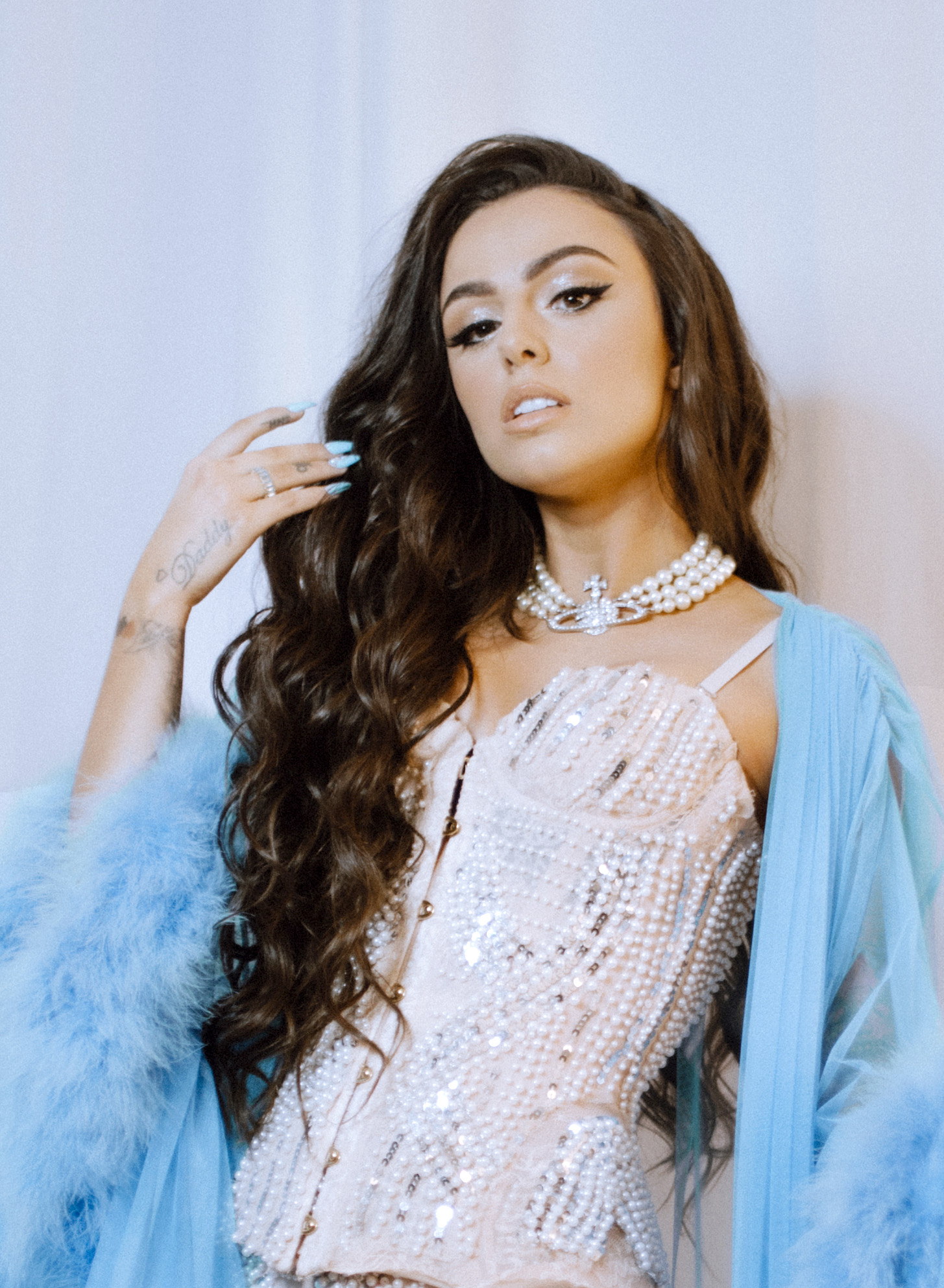
- Lloyd in 2020
- Born: 28 July 1993 (age 33); Malvern, Worcestershire, England
- Occupation: Singer
- Years active: 2010–present
- Works: Discography
- Spouse: Craig Monk (m. 2013)
- Children: 2
- Musical career
- Genres: Pop; R&B; pop-rap; hip hop
- Instruments: Vocals
- Labels: Syco; Epic; Polydor
- Website: cherlloyd.com

Cher Lloyd (born 28 July 1993) is an English singer. She participated on the seventh series of the television talent show The X Factor in 2010, where she finished in fourth place. Following the show, Lloyd was signed to Syco Music in the United Kingdom and Epic Records in the United States. She released her debut studio album, Sticks and Stones, in 2011, which had two releases: its standard edition and a US version. The album peaked at number four on the UK Albums Chart, while the latter version debuted at number nine in the US Billboard 200. It included the successful singles "Swagger Jagger", which entered at number one on the UK Singles Chart, "With Ur Love", and "Want U Back".

Lloyd released her second studio album, Sorry I'm Late, in 2014, preceded by the lead single, "I Wish". The album failed to match the success of its predecessor, peaking at number 21 on the UK Albums Chart and number 12 on the Billboard 200. After a collaboration with American singer Demi Lovato on the single "Really Don't Care", Lloyd had a two-year absence from the music industry.

In July 2016, Lloyd released the single "Activated". She released the singles "None of My Business" and "M.I.A." in 2018 and 2019, respectively. In 2020, Lloyd released two singles, "Lost" and "One Drink Away". A collaboration with Kazakh DJ Imanbek, "Baddest", was released in 2021. After a four-year hiatus, in 2025, Lloyd released "Head Down" and "Green Light". In 2026, she released "Sweet Devotion" with Fuzion.

== Early life ==
Born on 28 July 1993, Cher Lloyd was raised in Malvern, Worcestershire, with her parents Darren and Diane Lloyd, as well as her three younger siblings Sophie, Josh, and Rosie. Her family is of Romani origin, and Lloyd spent the first year of her life travelling around Wales with her young parents in a caravan. Speaking to former Now magazine, her uncle said she was teased and bullied by classmates due to her origins. Lloyd attended the Chase School, Malvern, and later Dyson Perrins High School, where she studied performing arts. At the age of 13, she attended the theatre arts school Stagecoach for 18 months.

== Career ==
=== 2010–2011: The X Factor ===
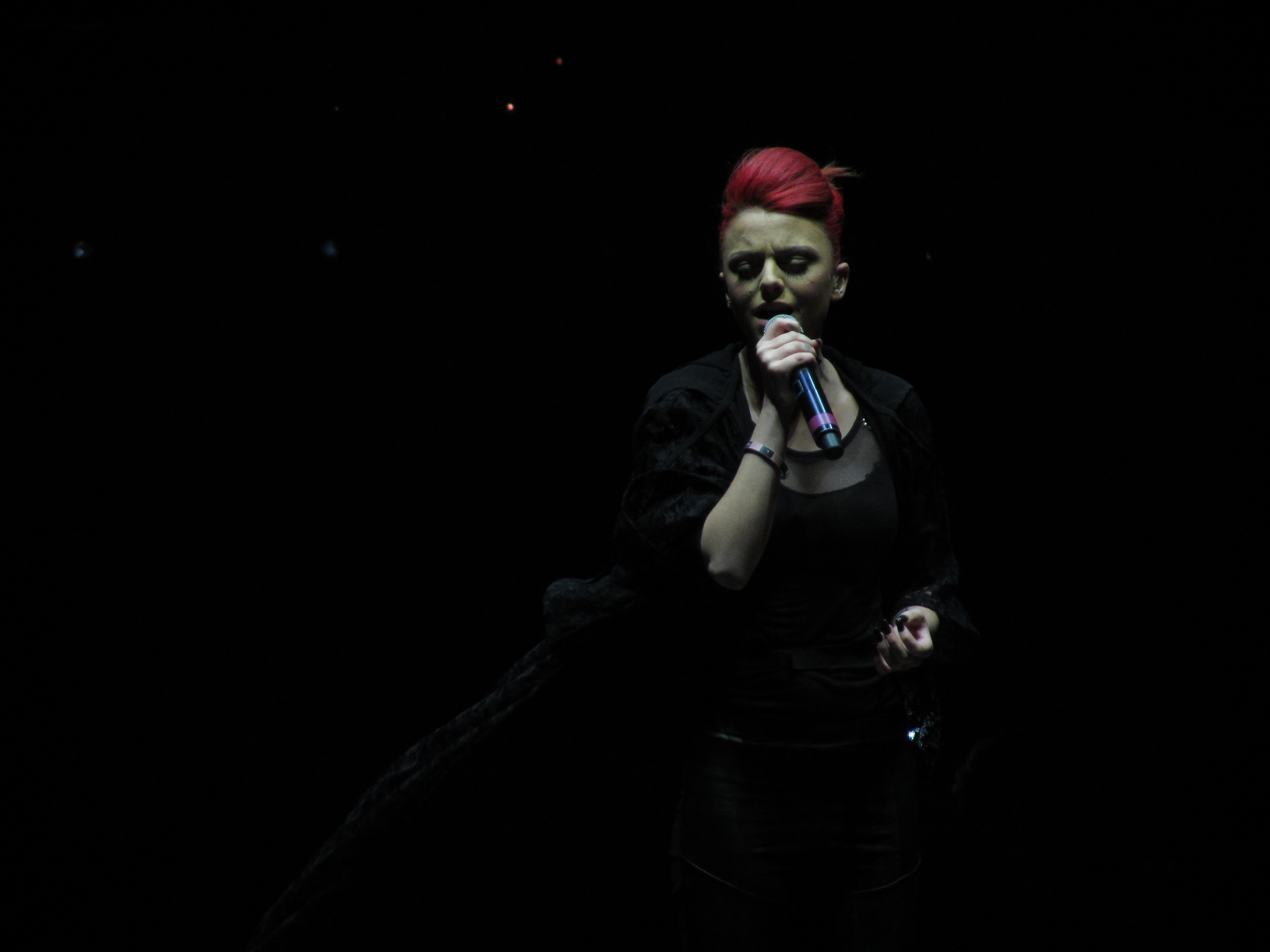
Lloyd performing at The X Factor live in Glasgow on 1 April 2011

Lloyd had previously performed at holiday camps, saying that she had received a mixed reaction to her music; but she was a big hit with The X Factor judges at the time. She auditioned singing the Keri Hilson version of "Turn My Swag On" by American rapper Soulja Boy. At bootcamp, she sang a rap version of "Viva La Vida". She also performed "Cooler than Me" at the judges' houses, but suffered from tonsillitis and was unable to complete the song.

Lloyd sang a rendition of "Just Be Good to Me" in the first of the live shows. In the second live show, she performed "Hard Knock Life (Ghetto Anthem)"; she sang a mashup of "No Diggity" and "Shout" in the third live show. In the fourth, she performed "Stay", the first time Lloyd did not rap in her performance and Cowell called it "the performance of the series". In the fifth week, Lloyd sang "Empire State of Mind", but the judges stated that, after the previous week, they were disappointed. However, they agreed that she redeemed herself with her rendition of "Sorry Seems to Be the Hardest Word" mixed with "Mockingbird" by Elton John and Eminem, respectively, in the sixth week. In the seventh week, Lloyd was in the bottom two with Paije Richardson for the first time after her rendition of "Imagine", although she was convinced to be kept after singing "Stay"; however, Cowell, Cole, and Walsh all saved her in the final showdown. In the following week, she performed "Girlfriend", followed by "Walk This Way". Both performances were credited by the judges, and Lloyd was saved by the public vote the following night, securing her position in the semifinal. In the semifinal, Lloyd performed "Nothin' on You" and "Love the Way You Lie"; she was in the bottom two with Mary Byrne. She was saved by the judges again, and put through to the final. In the final, she performed a mashup of "The Clapping Song" and "Get Ur Freak On", followed by a duet with will.i.am, a mashup of "Where Is the Love?" and "I Gotta Feeling". Lloyd was then became the thirteenth contestant eliminated. From February 2011 to April, Lloyd and nine other contestants from the series participated in the X Factor Live Tour.

The X Factor performances and results
Episode	Theme	Song	Result
Auditions	Free choice	"Turn My Swag On"	Through to bootcamp
Bootcamp	Solo performance	"Viva La Vida"	Through to judges' houses
Judges' houses	Free choice	"Cooler Than Me"	Through to live shows
Live show 1	Number-one singles	"Just Be Good to Me"	Safe (3rd)
Live show 2	Heroes	"It's the Hard Knock Life"/"Hard Knock Life (Ghetto Anthem)"	Safe (6th)
Live show 3	Guilty Pleasures	"No Diggity"/"Shout"	Safe (4th)
Live show 4	Halloween	"Stay"	Safe (2nd)
Live show 5	American anthems	"Empire State of Mind"	Safe (5th)
Live show 6	Songs by Elton John	"Sorry Seems to Be the Hardest Word"/"Mockingbird"	Safe (5th)
Live show 7	Songs by The Beatles	"Imagine"	Bottom two (8th)
Live show 7	Final showdown	"Stay"	Bottom two (8th)
Live show 8	Rock	"Girlfriend"	Safe (3rd)
Live show 8	Rock	"Walk This Way"	Safe (3rd)
Semi-final	Club Classics	"Nothin' on You"	Bottom two (5th)
Semi-final	Song to get you to the final	"Love the Way You Lie"	Bottom two (5th)
Semi-final	Final showdown	"Everytime"	Bottom two (5th)
Final	Free choice	"The Clapping Song"/"Get Ur Freak On"	Eliminated (4th)
Final	Mentor duets	"Where Is the Love?"/"I Gotta Feeling" with will.i.am	Eliminated (4th)

=== 2011–2012: Sticks and Stones ===
After the finale of the seventh series of The X Factor, it was announced that Lloyd had been signed to Syco Music. Shortly after, recording began for her debut studio album with songwriter Autumn Rowe, and producers RedOne, Johnny Powers, and the Runners. On 28 July 2011, Lloyd previewed five tracks from the album during a UStream session, including singles featuring Busta Rhymes, Mike Posner, Ghetts, Mic Righteous, and Dot Rotten.

Lloyd's debut single, "Swagger Jagger", was released in July 2011. It entered at number one on the UK Singles Chart, with sales exceeding 303,000 copies in Britain. In the Republic of Ireland, the single charted at number two on the Irish Singles Chart, while it debuted at number 79 on the Mega Top 100 in the Netherlands. After a performance during the finals of So You Think You Can Dance, the song moved up the chart to number 60. Lloyd released her debut studio album, Sticks + Stones, on 4 November. It entered the UK Albums Chart at number 4, while peaking at number seven in Ireland. The album sold 55,668 copies in its opening week. The second single "With Ur Love", featuring American singer Mike Posner, debuted on the UK Singles Chart at number four with first-week sales of 74,030 copies. It sold more than the predecessor, selling 66,316 copies when "Swagger Jagger" debuted at number one in the United Kingdom in August 2011. "With Ur Love" also marked the highest-selling number-four single since Barbadian singer Rihanna's 2010 single "Only Girl (In the World)", which sold 74,248 copies in 2010. The third single of Sticks + Stones, "Want U Back", featuring American rapper Astro, debuted at number 56, and rose 30 places to number 26 with sales of 9,730.

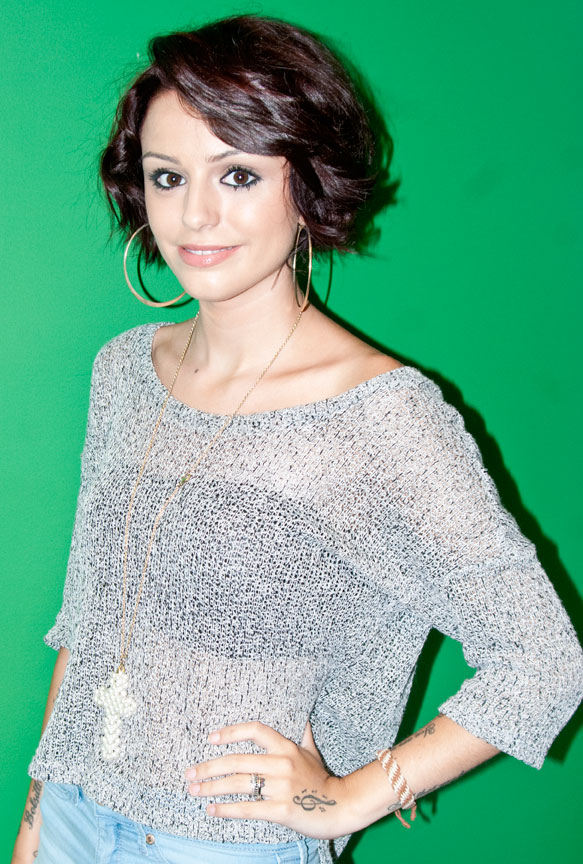
Lloyd at Chicago radio station WKSC-FM in 2012

In November, Lloyd announced her debut headlining UK tour, the Sticks and Stones Tour, which took place in March and April 2012. On 13 December, a music video for "Dub on the Track", featuring underground artists Mic Righteous, Dot Rotten, and Ghetts, who also all appear in the accompanying video, was premiered on SBTV. In December, two more dates were added, due to popular demand for tickets. Same month, Lloyd signed a record deal with L.A. Reid to Epic Records in the United States; a solo version of "Want U Back" was confirmed as Lloyd's debut single in the US and the first one from the American and Australian release of Sticks and Stones. The song was released in May 2012, debuting at number 75 on the US Billboard Hot 100 chart before rising to number 12. It also peaked at number 9 on the US Billboard Pop Songs, number 5 on Digital Songs, number 39 on the Hot 100 Airplay, and number 23 on Adult Pop Songs. In Canada, it debuted at number 95 on the Canadian Hot 100 chart and peaked at number 11. As of February 2013, the track has sold over 2,000,000 copies in the US, and almost 3,000,000 copies worldwide.

The second US single, "Oath", featuring American rapper Becky G, was released in October. However, it failed to match its predecessor's success, peaking at number 73 in the US Billboard Hot 100. In New Zealand, following the major success of "Want U Back" which reached number 3, "Oath" peaked at number 13, becoming Lloyd's third consecutive Top 20 hit in that country. The American and Australian versions of Sticks and Stones were released on 2 October 2012, through Epic Records. The edition peaked at number nine in the US, selling 31,000 copies in its opening week. In Australia, the album reached number thirty. In October 2012, Lloyd supported American band Hot Chelle Rae on the Australian leg of their Whatever World Tour.

=== 2013–2015: Sorry I'm Late and hiatus ===
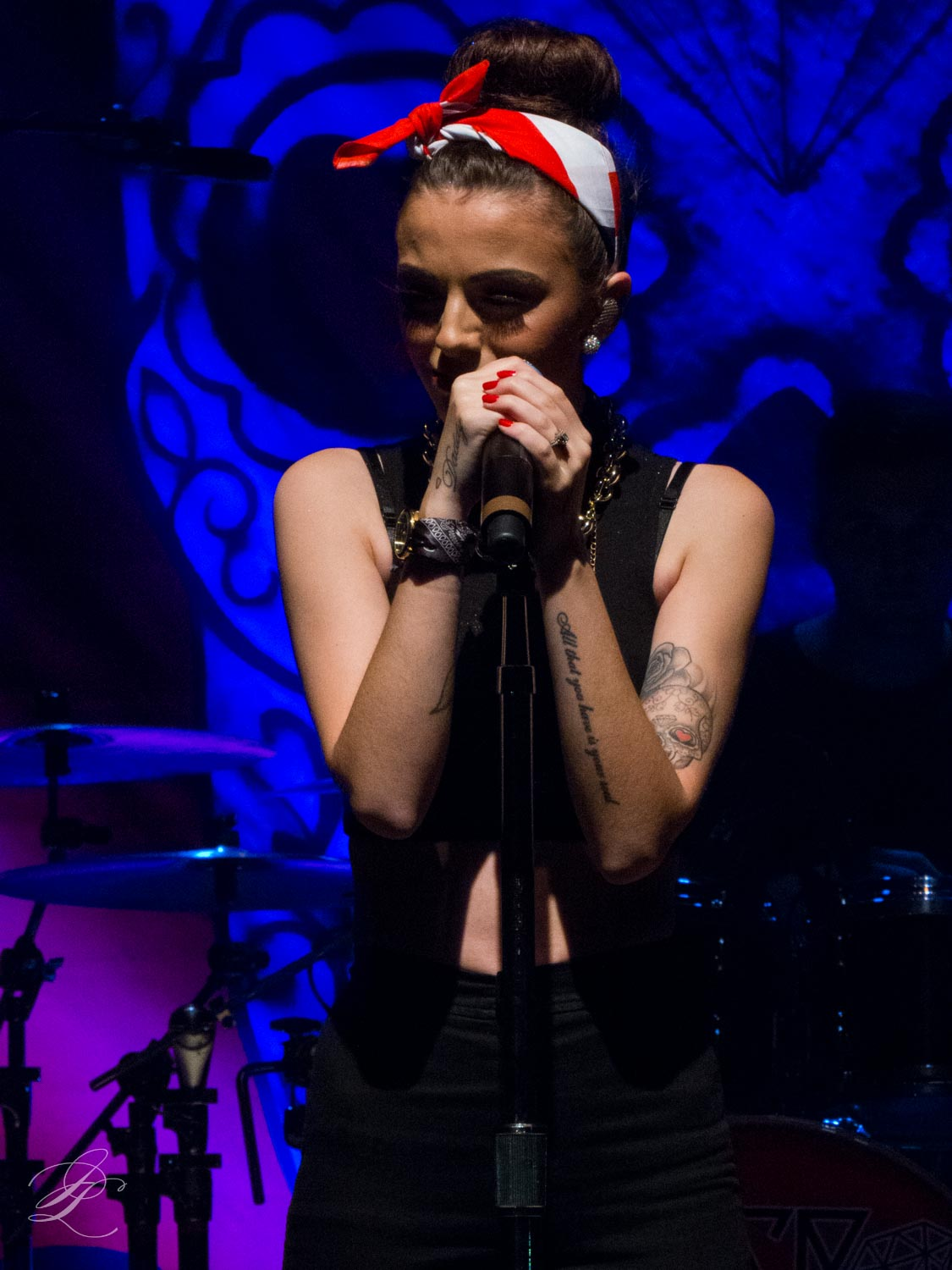
Lloyd performing in 2013 on her I Wish Tour

Months after the release of Sticks + Stones, Lloyd confirmed that recording had begun for her second studio album, with new songwriters and producers such as Beth Ditto and Tove Lo. In January 2013, she announced that she would guest-star on American musical sitcom Big Time Rush. In April, she announced that she would collaborate with American singer Ne-Yo on "It's All Good", premiered in June of that year. In November, during an interview with American radio host Larry King, Lloyd confirmed that she had left Syco Music after she and Cowell disagreed about her career path in music. She also revealed that the album, originally due for release in November, was pushed back until early 2014, despite the record being done.

Lloyd announced that her tour I Wish Tour would take place in the fall of 2013 and that girl group Fifth Harmony would serve as the opening act. In May 2014, Lloyd was featured on "Really Don't Care", the fourth single off American singer Demi Lovato's fourth album Demi. It peaked at numbers 1 and 98 on the US Dance and Billboard Hot 100 charts, respectively. Lloyd's second studio album, Sorry I'm Late, was released on 24 May 2014. It peaked on the US Billboard 200 chart at number 12, with 17,000 copies sold in its first week. In Europe, the album peaked at number 58 on the Irish Albums Chart, while it debuted at number 21 on the UK Albums Chart. Its lead single, "I Wish", featuring American rapper T.I., debuted within the US on the US Bubbling Under Hot 100 Singles chart at number 16. It also charted on the ARIA Singles Chart at number 40 and on New Zealand at number 16. The second single, "Sirens", peaked on the US Pop Digital Songs chart at number 48. The song also charted on the UK Singles Chart at number 41. The album sold 41,000 copies in the US as of December 2014.

Following the release of Sorry I'm Late, Lloyd was removed from Epic's website, leading to the suspicion that she had been dropped by the label. In November 2014, it was revealed that she had signed a new record deal with Universal Music Group in September and was working on her third studio album.

=== 2016–present: Label change and single releases ===
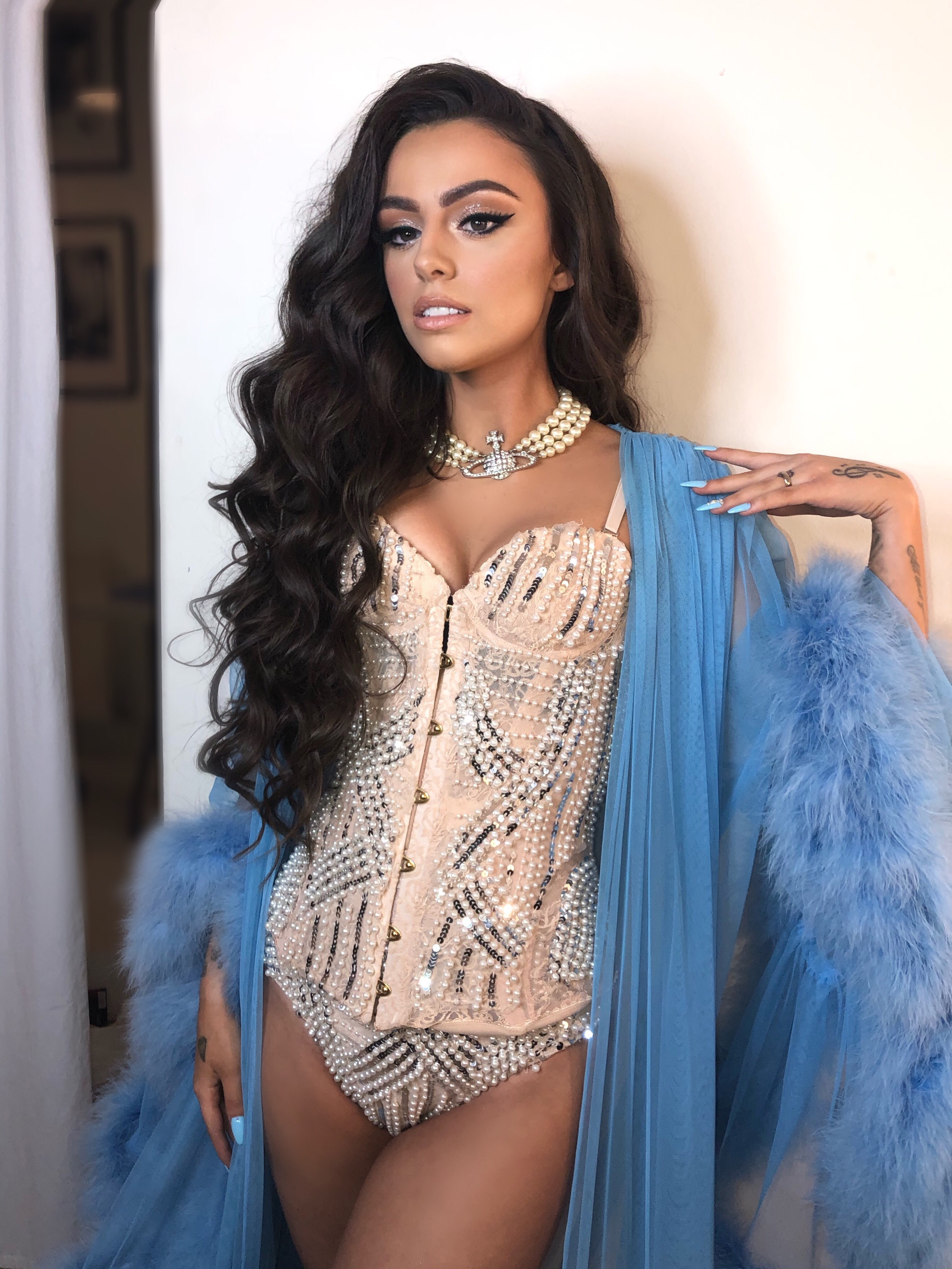
Lloyd in 2020

Lloyd broke her silence in March 2016 by posting a video on her social media pages. In the video, Lloyd states: "I just want to say thank you so much for being so patient. It's been a while but it's definitely worth the wait and I can't wait for everybody to hear it." She also revealed in an interview with New You Media that her third album is almost finished. On 15 July 2016, Lloyd teased the release of her new song "Activated" on social media; the song was premiered a week later. In May 2017, Lloyd announced that she had signed a record deal with Ie:music. The following year, she was the featured vocalist on the track "4U" by Swedish producer Joakim Molitor. On 19 October, Lloyd released the single "None of My Business" along with the music video. A year later, she released the single "M.I.A", which would be the lead single of her upcoming third studio album. On 24 April 2020, Lloyd premiered the single "Lost" alongside a music video. In 2025, she released two singles: "Head Down" on 17 January alongside a music video; "Green Light" on 4 April. Lloyd collaborated with Fuzion on "Sweet Devotion" in 2026.

== Artistry ==
=== Musical style ===
Lloyd's musical style is often described as a pop, R&B, pop-rap, and hip-hop. As a musical artist, she has been described as an "expressive, playful R&B" artist with a "unique blend of pop smarts and urban attitude"; she stated in BBC: "I feel like I've finally entered this new phase of my career where it's totally authentic" in regards to her music career.

Early in her career, Lloyd was known for her "infectious pop-rap, charting hits", ranging from songs such as "Swagger Jagger" and "Want U Back" to her collaborations "Really Don't Care" with Demi Lovato and "Oath" with Becky G. With the release of "None of My Business" and "M.I.A", she began to take a more mature approach to her work in what Brittany Spanos of Rolling Stone described as a "mature phase".

=== Influences ===
Lloyd revealed in an interview that she is a fan of American singer Dolly Parton. Lloyd also cited Trinidadian rapper Nicki Minaj as an influence, saying that she looks up to Minaj for her "attitude" around "doing what you feel like doing and be who you are". She went on to say that Minaj "has helped change pop music ... and there's no denying it".

== Personal life ==
In January 2012, Lloyd announced her engagement to her boyfriend of less than a year, Craig Monk. They were married in 2013. In May 2018, they had their first child, a daughter named Delilah-Rae. In April 2023, Lloyd announced that the couple was expecting their second child together. Their second daughter was born on 9 September 2023.

== Discography ==
- Sticks and Stones (2011)
- Sorry I'm Late (2014)

== Filmography ==
Television
Year	Title	Role	Notes
2010	The X Factor	Contestant	UK version
2011	The X Factor	Performer	UK version
2012	Make Your Mark: Shake It Up Dance Off	Herself/Judge	Disney Channel
2012	The X Factor US	Performer	US version
2013	Big Time Rush	Herself	"Big Time Scandal"
2016	Celebrity Juice	Herself	2016 Halloween Special

== Tours ==
=== Headlining ===
- Sticks and Stones Tour (2012)
- I Wish Tour (2013)

=== Supporting ===
- X Factor Tour 2011
- Whatever World Tour (Hot Chelle Rae)
- The Red Tour (Taylor Swift)
- The Neon Lights Tour (Demi Lovato)

== Awards and nominations ==
Year	Award	Category	Work	Result
2011	UK Music Video Awards	The People's Choice Award	"Swagger Jagger"	Nominated
2013	Radio Disney Music Awards	She's The One – Best Female Artist	Cher Lloyd	Nominated
2013	Radio Disney Music Awards	Funniest Celebrity Take	How To Audition – Cher Lloyd	Nominated
2013	Radio Disney Music Awards	Hit The Road – Best Break Up Song	"Want U Back"	Nominated
2013	Radio Disney Music Awards	The Bestest – Song Of The Year	"Want U Back"	Nominated
2013	MTV Europe Music Awards	Artist on the Rise	Cher Lloyd	Nominated
2014	Teen Choice Awards	Breakup Song	"Really Don't Care" (Demi Lovato featuring Cher Lloyd)	Nominated
2014	Teen Choice Awards	Choice Summer Song	"Really Don't Care" (Demi Lovato featuring Cher Lloyd)	Won
2014	Young Hollywood Awards	Song of the summer/ Dj replay	"Really Don't Care" (Demi Lovato featuring Cher Lloyd)	Nominated
2014	MTV Video Music Awards	Best Lyric Video	"Really Don't Care" (Demi Lovato featuring Cher Lloyd)	Nominated
2015	Radio Disney Music Awards	Hit The Road – Best Breakup Song	"Really Don't Care" (Demi Lovato featuring Cher Lloyd)	Nominated
2015	Radio Disney Music Awards	Musical Mashup – Best Collaboration	"Really Don't Care" (Demi Lovato featuring Cher Lloyd)	Won

== See also ==
- List of artists who reached number one on the UK Singles Chart
