= Want U Back =

2012 single by Cher Lloyd featuring Astro

Single by Cher Lloyd featuring Astro

from the album Sticks and Stones
- Released: 3 February 2012
- Genre: Pop; electropop; R&B; teen pop; new jack swing
- Length: 3:34 (album version); 3:44 (featured versions)
- Label: Syco; Epic; Sony
- Songwriters: Savan Kotecha; Shellback
- Producer: Shellback

Cher Lloyd singles chronology
"With Ur Love" (2011)	"Want U Back" (2012)	"Oath" (2012)

Astro singles chronology
"Want U Back" (2012)	"Deadbeat" (2012)

Snoop Dogg singles chronology
"I Drink I Smoke" (2011)	"Want U Back" (2012)	"Slow Motion" (2012)

Alternative cover
- North American artwork

Music video
- "Want U Back" (featuring Astro) on YouTube "Want U Back" (US Version) on YouTube

"Want U Back" is a song by English singer Cher Lloyd from her debut studio album, Sticks and Stones (2011). It was released as the third single from the album on 3 February 2012, and it was released as the lead single from the US version of the album on 22 May 2012. The UK single release features guest vocals from The X Factor US contestant Astro. In the United States, the song was released as a solo single, without Astro's verses. Its remix features Snoop Dogg. The song was written by Savan Kotecha and Shellback, with production being handled by the latter. Musically, "Want U Back" is a pop song with an electro-pop beat, while lyrically it is about a girl who's jealous of her ex-boyfriend's new relationship, and tries to sabotage the new relationship.

The song received acclaim from most music critics, some praised her sassy attitude on the song and labelled it "infectious". There are two videos for the song: the UK version and the US version. The UK video features Lloyd traipsing through old photographs with her former beau and some with his new girlfriend and wreaking havoc on the happy couple, while the US version features Lloyd at a diner (Cadillac Jack's) wreaking havoc on her ex's new girlfriend. The song reached number three on the New Zealand Singles Chart, number 11 on the Canadian Hot 100, number 18 on the Irish Singles Chart and number 25 on the UK Singles Chart. In the United States, the song peaked at number nine on Billboard's Pop Songs chart, and number 12 on the Billboard Hot 100, making it her first top 40 hit in the United States. To date, it is Lloyd's biggest hit worldwide.

== Background and release ==
On 15 December 2011, it was announced that "Want U Back" would be released as the third single from Lloyd's debut album, Sticks and Stones. The artwork was revealed on 22 December 2011. In an interview with Metro News's Daniella Graham, Lloyd stated that she hoped the track would help her get into the American market, saying "I don’t expect anyone to know who I am because I live in the UK. I'm from The X Factor and I came fourth. It's crazy and it gives me a lot of hope. With the USA, I'm not going to run before I can walk but you never know what's going to happen." The UK single release features The X Factor US season one contestant Astro. L.A. Reid, who mentored Astro, had recently signed Lloyd to Epic Records in the US. A new version of "Want U Back" was released as Lloyd's debut single in the US. Lloyd was reported to have collaborated with rapper Snoop Dogg on "Want U Back" for her US debut. The version with Snoop Dogg was released as a bonus track to Sticks and Stones on Lloyd's online store and on the Japanese edition of the album. The US version of the song appears as one of the 16 main tracks on Now That's What I Call Music! 43.

== Composition ==
"Want U Back" is a pop, electro-pop and R&B song, written by American songwriter Savan Kotecha and Swedish songwriter Shellback and was produced by the latter. Lyrically, it finds Lloyd singing about her jealousy of her former lover and his new girlfriend. While talking about the song, Lloyd stated:

"It's basically a track from lots of different girls' stories out there. A lot of people are telling me they can relate to the track and they've been in that situation, but it's also got an element of fun in it."

The beats and guitar in the song, according to Digital Spy, "give the song an almost caricature quality." There is also some uses of Auto-Tune/pitch correction to go with the synths. Lloyd's vocal spans from the low note of A3 to the high note of F#5.

== Critical reception ==
The song received acclaim from many music critics. Nick Levine from BBC Music wrote a positive review, commenting: "She's a natural and charismatic vocal presence, so much so that Want U Back even creates a recurring hook from – how to put this? – the sound of her ‘frustrated grunts’." Jon O'Brien from AllMusic wrote that the song is "an infectious example of cutesy pure pop that recall Britney before she lost her innocence." Alex Denney from NME considered it "a sassy bit of bubble-drunk pop from Britney songwriter Max Martin." Danner had previously written in another NME review that the song is "a peachy-keen pop number that goes pining after an ex, Cher drawing comfort from the fact that, even if her beloved is going out with someone else now, at least they’re only getting sloppy seconds." Joe Rivers from No Ripcord wrote that "It's packed with hooks and has Cher’s personality stamped all over it."

Lewis Corner of Digital Spy gave the song a positive review stating: "Truth be told, it's quite refreshing for an artist to embrace their perceived public image, but the joke is really on us. Why? Because it's Cher Lloyd who has the last laugh with another hit on her hands." X. Alexander of Idolator said "Instead of blasting us with that 'Swagger Jagger', she's coming at us with the uber-catchy 'Want U Back' — a good choice, since we haven't been able to get it out of our heads since we first heard it." Virgin Media's Matthew Horton wrote that the song has "dynamic catchy bounce." David Griffiths from 4Music praised the track, writing: "It might not sound a million miles away from Miley Cyrus' 'Party in the U.S.A.', but it's got Cher's stamp all over it. From her dead pan delivery ('Please, this ain't even jealousy, she ain't got nothin' on me') to her screams of frustration peppered throughout the track, this has the potential to be an enormous global hit." Bradley Stern from "MuuMuse" commented: "It is one of the album’s catchiest, cutest moments–even if Lloyd’s gritting her teeth and clenching her fists with rage." He further wrote:

"Kicking off with a deliciously angry grunt that plays on loop (UHH!!!) [...] Lloyd sings incredulously on the bouncing electropop beat, dissing the chick’s jeans and denying all charges of jealousy in the process."

In December, popular US teen website Pop Dust called "Want U Back" the 25th Best Song of 2012. They wrote about it saying "An entire timeline of Stockholm syndrome in three-and-a-half minutes: Who is this manic muppet, and why is she grunting? Does she know he doesn't want her back? At least she's honest about her brattiness though, that's refreshing. Do you think she's in on the joke? Huh, it's over already? OK, maybe just one more listen. Wait, why can't I get her voice out of my head? Rimembah ol the things that you an' oi did fuhst? No, stop looking at me like that, I'm just doing my Cher Lloyd impression".

== Chart performance ==
"Want U Back" first appeared on the UK Singles Chart on the week ending 19 November 2011. The track debuted at number 194, following digital downloads from the respective album. The song then re-entered the chart at number 56 on the week ending 21 January 2012 – following the release of the music video and confirmation of its release as a single. On its third charting week, the song rose 30 places to number 26 with sales of 9,730. In New Zealand, "Want U Back" was a massive success, reaching #3.

The song debuted at number 38 on the US Pop Songs chart. It also charted at number 39 on the Hot 100 Airplay chart. On the Billboard Hot 100 chart, it debuted at number 75 on the issue date of 30 June, The next week it rose to number 51, rising to number 35 the following week and climbing to number 27 the next week and still climbing to chart at number 16 on the issue date of 28 July; dropping one position the next week to number 17 and climbing to its peaking position, number 12, the next week. It was last seen on the Billboard Hot 100, close to exiting the top 75, later moving to "recurrent status" after 20 weeks if fallen below position number 50. "Want U Back" dropped to number 73 on the issue date of 10 November to drop the chart the following week. It has since peaked number 9 on Billboard Pop Songs, number 5 on the Digital Songs and number 23 on Adult Pop Songs. It also debuted at number 95 on the Canadian Hot 100 chart and has since peaked at number 11. As of February 2013, the track has sold over 2,000,000 copies in the US, and almost 3,000,000 copies worldwide.

== Music video ==
Lloyd spills popcorn on her ex-boyfriend and his girlfriend in the UK music video.

=== International version ===
The music video for the song was uploaded to YouTube on 6 January 2012. The video was shot in Hollywood, Los Angeles, California.

The clip shows Lloyd being jealous of her ex and his new relationship with another girl, and she tries to sabotage the new pair. Lloyd's shown on her bed looking at old photos of her and her ex-boyfriends, and she comes up with various ideas to separate them. These include Lloyd pouring a water bottle over her ex while they're at the park, and in another scene, she throws popcorn over them at a movie theater. Astro makes an appearance to rap his verse, and the video ends with Lloyd imitating a helicopter.

She also recorded a live acoustic version of the song, the video of which was uploaded to YouTube on 15 December 2011.

=== US version ===
Lloyd being arrested on the US version of the music video.

In 2012, Lloyd recorded an alternate video which was shown in the US. It premiered on 30 April 2012. This new video shows Lloyd confronting her ex-boyfriend and his new girlfriend in California diner Cadillac Jacks, while performing the track on the restaurant's counter top. During the video, she gives her ex-boyfriend a strawberry smoothie and he accidentally spills it on his girlfriend. Lloyd sings with the crowd, and wreaks havoc all around. The police then arrive to arrest Lloyd and take her into custody, where she is getting her mugshot taken and is also seen singing, alone or with her friends who had joined her in the mischief. This version has over 277 million views as of May 2021.

== Live performances ==
Lloyd has performed the track live at every radio station she visited on her radio tour. The majority of these performances were done acoustically. On 25 July 2012 Lloyd made her US television debut after a performance on an America's Got Talent results show. On 30 August 2012, Lloyd performed the song, along with her next single, "With Ur Love", on Today to an audience of hundreds of fans. She sang the song with Taylor Swift on Swift's Red Tour on 19 August 2013.

== Track listing ==
Digital download
No.	Title	Length
1.	"Want U Back" (featuring Astro)	3:44

Digital download
No.	Title	Length
1.	"Want U Back"	3:33

EP
No.	Title	Length
1.	"Want U Back" (featuring Astro)	3:44
2.	"Want U Back" (Radio Edit)	3:33
3.	"Want U Back" (Acoustic)	3:28
4.	"Want U Back" (Cahill Remix)	5:52
5.	"Want U Back" (Pete Phantom Remix)	3:54

== Charts ==
=== Weekly charts ===
Chart (2012)	Peak position
Australia (ARIA)	36
Belgium (Ultratip Bubbling Under Flanders)	88
Belgium (Ultratip Bubbling Under Wallonia)	38
Canada Hot 100 (Billboard)	11
Canada CHR/Top 40 (Billboard)	11
Canada Hot AC (Billboard)	19
Czech Republic Airplay (ČNS IFPI)	44
Ireland (IRMA)	18
Japan Hot 100 (Billboard)	33
New Zealand (Recorded Music NZ)	3
Scottish Singles Sales (Official Charts)	23
UK Singles (Official Charts)	25
US Billboard Hot 100	12
US Adult Pop Airplay (Billboard)	22
US Dance Airplay (Billboard)	15
US Heatseekers Songs (Billboard)	1
US Pop Airplay (Billboard)	9
US Rhythmic Airplay (Billboard)	27
Russia Airplay (Tophit)	238

=== Year-end charts ===
Chart (2012)	Position
Canada (Canadian Hot 100)	63
New Zealand (Recorded Music NZ)	39
UK Singles (OCC)	180
US Billboard Hot 100	55
US Mainstream Top 40 (Billboard)	45

== Certifications ==
Certifications and sales for "Want U Back"
Region	Certification	Certified units/sales
Australia (ARIA)	Platinum	70,000^{^}
New Zealand (RMNZ)	2× Platinum	60,000^{‡}
United Kingdom (BPI)	Gold	400,000^{‡}
United States (RIAA)	2× Platinum	2,000,000^{*}
^{*} Sales figures based on certification alone.^{^} Shipments figures based on certification alone.^{‡} Sales+streaming figures based on certification alone.

== Release history ==
Region	Date	Format	Version	Label(s)	Ref.
Australia	3 February 2012	Digital download	featuring Astro	Syco; Sony	
Europe	17 February 2012	Digital download (EP)	featuring Astro	Syco; Sony	
United States	28 February 2012	Top 40 radio	featuring Astro	Epic	
United States	8 May 2012	Top 40 radio	Solo	Epic	
United States	22 May 2012	Digital download	Solo	Epic; Syco; Sony	
Japan	5 September 2012	Digital download	Solo	Epic; Syco; Sony	
