= Johnny Powers (musician) =

American guitarist, singer, writer and producer (1938–2023)

- Birth name: John Leon Joseph Pavlik
- Born: May 25, 1938; East Detroit, Michigan, U.S.
- Died: January 16, 2023 (aged 84); Michigan, U.S.
- Genres: Rockabilly
- Instrument(s): Guitar, vocal
- Years active: 1953–2023

John Leon Joseph Pavlik (May 25, 1938 – January 16, 2023), known professionally as Johnny Powers, was an American guitar player, singer, writer and producer specializing in rockabilly. Powers was best known for his 1957 recording on the now-defunct Fox Records label entitled "Long Blond Hair".

Powers (as Pavlik) began his professional career in 1953 at age 15, when he joined a local Detroit country band known as Jimmy Williams and the Drifters. Later, having become a fan of Carl Perkins and the young Elvis Presley, Powers began to include rock & roll elements in his music.

Until 1955, Powers performed and recorded under his birth name but, following a studio session for Fortune Records in Detroit, co-owner Devora Brown – seeing Pavlik eating a PowerHouse candy bar – gave him the stage name of Johnny Powers.

Powers released a pair of singles on the Fox Records label (not to be confused with today's 20th Century Fox Records), including "Long Blond Hair". Fox went out of business soon thereafter and in 1959 Powers signed with Sun Records, which released one single under his name. In 1960, Powers met with Berry Gordy and signed on with Motown Records, becoming the first white male musician to do so; he is also thought to be the only recording artist to have ever been under contract to both Sun and Motown Records. In his five year relationship with Motown, Powers devoted most of his energies to producing and writing rather than recording.

Powers was inducted into the Rockabilly Hall of Fame.

Powers died in Michigan on January 16, 2023, at the age of 84.
