= Oath (song) =

2012 single by Cher Lloyd featuring Becky G

Single by Cher Lloyd featuring Becky G

from the album Sticks and Stones
- Released: 2 October 2012
- Recorded: 2012
- Studio: Luke's in the Boo (Malibu, CA); Sarm Studios (London, England); Jungle City Studios (New York, NY)
- Genre: Pop rap; Teen pop
- Length: 3:38
- Label: Syco Music; Sony; Epic Records
- Songwriters: Rebbeca Marie Gomez; Lukasz Gottwald; Ammar Malik; Daniel Omelio; Henry Walter; Emily Wright
- Producers: Dr. Luke; Cirkut; Robopop

Cher Lloyd singles chronology
"Want U Back" (2012)	"Oath" (2012)	"Rum and Raybans" (2012)

Becky G singles chronology
"Wish U Were Here" (2012)	"Oath" (2012)	"Die Young (Remix)" (2012)

Music video
- "Oath" on YouTube

"Oath" is a song by English singer Cher Lloyd, featuring American singer Becky G. The track was released on 2 October 2012, as the second single from the American version of Lloyd's debut studio album, Sticks and Stones, and the fourth single overall. "Oath", produced by Dr. Luke and Cirkut, was played for the first time on New York City radio station Z100. The track was released as a single in the United States, Canada, Australia and New Zealand only. "Oath" was not as successful as Lloyd's previous single, "Want U Back", in the United States, debuting at number 99, and peaking at number 73 on the Billboard Hot 100. The single was certified gold by the Recording Industry Association of America (RIAA) denoting sales of 500,000 in the country. In New Zealand, following the major success of "Want U Back", which reached number three, "Oath" made a respectable impact, peaking at number 13, becoming Lloyd's third consecutive Top 20 hit in that country. On 25 January 2026, the song became available on Spotify in the UK.

== Background ==
"Oath" was originally written by Rebbeca Gomez but was brought to Cher Lloyd by Dr. Luke. It was later modified by songwriters Ammar Malik and Emily Wright, along with help from producers Dr. Luke, Cirkut and Robopop, for inclusion on Lloyd's second studio album, slated for release in 2013. However, when it was revealed that Lloyd's debut album, Sticks and Stones, was set to be revised for the American and Australian markets, Lloyd's producers decided to use the track as one of the record's lead singles, and Lloyd asked Gomez to appear on the track with her to sing one of the verses. Thus, "Oath" was released as the album's second single, following "Want U Back", in both the United States and Australia, and also featured on the version of the album released in Japan. The track itself premiered on New York City radio station Z100 on 7 September 2012.

== Music video ==
The music video for "Oath" was filmed over the course of three days, between 19 and 21 September 2012. The video was directed by Hannah Lux Davis, and was first previewed in a number of images released via Lloyd's Twitter account. The video premiered in full on 4 October 2012, via Lloyd's official VEVO account on YouTube. The music video has over 146 million views on YouTube as of June 2020.

=== Synopsis ===
The video features Lloyd as a student in a high school who is kept behind in detention. Lloyd taps her pencil similar to the scene in "...Baby One More Time" by Britney Spears. This scene is cut multiple times by Lloyd sitting on the hood of a red classic convertible. Lloyd and her friends walk to a car filled with pool toys after getting out of school. Gomez begins her verses as she is seen in front of several lockers, with "OATH" written on them. After Gomez's first two lines, the scene cuts to two girls who stare at the two singers walking into a laundromat. They pass a young man playing "Want U Back" on Just Dance 4 and push him aside, and they both pick up a Wii remote to play the game; these scenes are spliced with the girls playing with carts full of clothes. They then walk outside while people look at the group of friends, the men being attracted. The singers dance around the red convertible and a green jeep. The cars drive down a highway to the beach where the friends are seen dancing and playing.

== Live performances ==
Lloyd performed the song live for the first time on On Air with Ryan Seacrest on 1 October 2012. She performed the song on Today on 5 October, and on Live! with Kelly and Michael on 28 October 2012. Cher also sang the song with Becky G on the American broadcast of The X Factor, on the Top 10 results show on 22 November 2012. Lloyd also performed the song while she was a supporting act on Demi Lovato's The Neon Lights Tour.

== Track listing ==
Digital download
No.	Title	Length
1.	"Oath" (featuring Becky G)	3:38
Total length:		3:38

== Charts and certifications ==
=== Weekly charts ===
Chart (2012–13)	Peak position
Australia (ARIA)	58
Canada Hot 100 (Billboard)	58
New Zealand (Recorded Music NZ)	13
Slovakia Airplay (ČNS IFPI)	66
US Billboard Hot 100	73
US Pop Airplay (Billboard)	30

=== Certifications ===
Region	Certification	Certified units/sales
New Zealand (RMNZ)	Platinum	15,000^{*}
United States (RIAA)	Gold	500,000^{‡}
^{*} Sales figures based on certification alone.^{‡} Sales+streaming figures based on certification alone.

== Release history ==
Country	Date	Format	Label
United States	2 October 2012	Digital download	Syco Music, Epic
United States	2 October 2012	Mainstream airplay	Syco Music, Epic
Australia	5 October 2012	Digital download	Syco Music, Epic
New Zealand	26 October 2012	Digital download	Syco Music, Epic
United Kingdom	25 January 2026	Digital download	Syco Music, Epic
