= None of My Business =

Single by Cher Lloyd
- Released: 19 October 2018
- Length: 3:04
- Label: Universal; Polydor
- Songwriters: Alexsej Vlasenko; Jeremy Chacon; Jonas Kalisch; Henrik Meinke; Kate Morgan
- Producer: Hitimpulse

Cher Lloyd singles chronology
"4U" (2018)	"None of My Business" (2018)	"Don't Lose Love" (2019)

"None of My Business" is a song by English singer and songwriter Cher Lloyd, released on 19 October 2018 through Universal Music Group. The song was announced in a video posted to Lloyd's social media platforms on 16 October 2018, revealing an introduction clip and release date for the single.

== Background ==
The song is Lloyd's first single in two years. In a press release for the song, Lloyd stated, "I've waited so long for people to finally listen to my new music, which I've worked so hard for a long time, and think 'None Of My Business' is a perfect taste for what's to come - I have never been so excited in my life to present my new music."

The single was considered a 'warm-up' track. Despite the lack of promotion, the single received over 500 million streams across platforms, with 57 million streams on Spotify along with 47 million views on YouTube as of October 2021.

== Composition ==
Musically, "None of My Business" has a length of three minutes and four seconds and moves at a tempo of 134 beats per minute. It incorporates "breezy production courtesy of Hitimpulse" and lyrically features Lloyd making it "very clear that she has moved on from a former flame". During the chorus she sings, "Damn, I heard that you and her been having issues/I wish you the best, I hope that she can fix you/You'll be calling me the second that it hits you, but baby, this is none of my business." The song has been described as "sassy and charismatic".

== Critical reception ==
Mike Nied of Idolator called the song Lloyd "at her most liberated, and she has rarely sounded better." Writing for The Guardian, Kate Solomon wrote that the "sing-songy nursery rhyme feel and breezy delivery don't hide the cutting tone", and compared it to anyone who has "spent an hour scrolling through an ex's Insta feed before sending 600 screengrabs to the group chat".

== Music video ==
The music video for the song was released through YouTube on 19 October 2018 in the United Kingdom, and in the United States on 22 October 2018. The video was filmed in Margate on the beach and in Dreamland amusement park. In the week of 9 November 2018 the video charted for one week at 94 on the UK Official Video Streaming Chart Top 100.

== Personnel ==
Credits adapted from Tidal.

- Cher Lloyd – vocals
- Hitimpulse – production, mixer
- Alexsej Vlasenko – songwriting, drums
- Jeremy Chacon – songwriting, bass guitar
- Jonas Kalisch – songwriting, keyboards
- Henrik Meinke – songwriting, synthesizing
- Kate Morgan – songwriting
- iamBaddluck – songwriting
- Lex Barkey – mastering

== Charts ==
Chart performance for "None of My Business"
Chart (2018)	Peak position
Scotland Singles (OCC)	58
UK Singles Downloads (OCC)	62

== Release history ==
Release history for "None of My Business"
Region	Date	Format	Label
Various	19 October 2018	Digital download; streaming	Universal
