= Swagger Jagger =

2011 single by Cher Lloyd

Single by Cher Lloyd

from the album Sticks and Stones
- Released: 29 July 2011
- Recorded: Beat Studio, Miami, Florida, United States
- Genre: Hip hop; dance-pop; electro-R&B
- Length: 3:12
- Label: Syco; Sony
- Songwriters: Cher Lloyd; Autumn Rowe; Jermaine Jackson; Andrew Harr; Andre Davidson; Sean Davidson; the Strangerz
- Producers: the Runners; the Monarch

Cher Lloyd singles chronology
"Swagger Jagger" (2011)	"With Ur Love" (2011)

Music video
- "Swagger Jagger" on YouTube

"Swagger Jagger" is the debut single by English singer and rapper Cher Lloyd, taken from her debut studio album, Sticks and Stones (2011). It was released as the album's lead single on 29 July 2011 by both Syco and Sony. The song was written by the two production teams The Runners and The Monarch with Lloyd, Autumn Rowe, Marcus Lomax and Clarence Coffee Jr. and is composed to the tune of "Oh My Darling, Clementine". The music video was released on 26 June 2011. It was also used in the movie Identity Thief with Melissa McCarthy.

Despite receiving negative reviews from music critics, the song debuted at number one on the UK Singles Chart, and at number two in Ireland, becoming her biggest hit to date in these countries. It also reached number five in Japan. The Guardian chose the song as the best number one single of 2011, along with the Official Charts listing the track as the 35th biggest song of the summer of 2011 in the UK.

== Background ==
"Swagger Jagger" received its first airplay on 20 June 2011. The single was leaked onto the internet on 15 June, but this version was later confirmed as only the demo of the track on Lloyd's Twitter account. Lloyd performed the song on T4 on the Beach and also performed at the Leeds Aire FM Party in the Park and Key 103 Live Manchester, both on the day of release of "Swagger Jagger".

== Critical reception ==
Initial reviews compared the song to the Christmas carol "Little Donkey". However, in a positive review, Robert Copsey of Digital Spy gave the song four out of five stars. He noted similarities between the song's chorus and the American western folk ballad "Oh My Darling, Clementine", an opinion shared by WhoSampled users. In a negative review, Sabotage Times said of the "abominable" track: "Coming across like a sink estate answer to the Black Eyed Peas, the track combines a shouty, tuneless verse with a chorus that riffs on 'Oh My Darling Clementine'".

== Chart performance ==
"Swagger Jagger" debuted at number one on the UK Singles Chart on 7 August 2011 ― for the week ending dated 13 August 2011. As of 12 August 2021, the single's sales have exceeded 300,000 copies in Britain. In Ireland, the single charted at number two on the Irish Singles Chart. The single debuted at number seventy-nine on the Mega Top 100 in the Netherlands. After a performance during the finals of So You Think You Can Dance, the song re-entered the chart at number sixty.

== Track listing ==
- UK digital EP
1. "Swagger Jagger" – 3:14
2. "Swagger Jagger" (Wideboys Radio Edit) – 3:03
3. "Swagger Jagger" (Dillon Francis Remix) – 5:06
4. "Swagger Jagger" (Eyes Remix) – 4:27
- UK CD single
1. "Swagger Jagger" – 3:12
2. "Swagger Jagger" (HyGrade Pecan Pie Mix) – 3:35
- US digital download
1. "Swagger Jagger" – 3:12

== Credits and personnel ==
- Cher Lloyd – songwriter, vocals
- Autumn Rowe – songwriter
- The Runners (Andrew Harr and Jermaine Jackson) – songwriter, producer
- The Monarch (Andre Davidson and Sean Davidson) – songwriter, co-producer
- The Monsters & Strangerz (Marcus Lomax and Clarence Coffee Jr.) – songwriter
- Jeff "Supa Jeff" Villanueva – engineer
- Serban Ghenea – mixing
- Alex Delicata – guitar
- Tom Coyne – mastering

== Charts ==
Chart (2011)	Peak position
Belgium (Ultratop 50 Flanders)	43
Ireland (IRMA)	2
Japan Hot 100 (Billboard)	5
Netherlands (Single Top 100)	60
Scotland Singles (Official Charts)	1
UK Singles (Official Charts)	1

=== Year-end charts ===
Year-end chart performance for "Swagger Jagger"
Chart (2011)	Position
UK Singles (OCC)	112

== Certifications ==
Region	Certification	Certified units/sales
United Kingdom (BPI)	Silver	200,000^{^}
^{^} Shipments figures based on certification alone.

== Release history ==
Country	Date	Format
Ireland	29 July 2011	Digital download
United Kingdom	31 July 2011	Digital download
United Kingdom	31 July 2011	Digital download
United Kingdom	1 August 2011	CD single
United States	1 August 2011	Digital download
Australia	2 August 2011	Digital download
