= Stro =

American rapper and actor (born 1996)

- Also known as: Astro; The Astronomical Kid; C.K.O; Coolest Kid Out; Stro the MC
- Born: Brian Vaughn Bradley Jr. September 27, 1996 (age 29); Brooklyn, New York, U.S.
- Genre: Hip hop
- Occupations: Rapper; record producer; songwriter; actor
- Instrument: Vocals
- Years active: 2006–present
- Labels: Grade A Tribe; Mass Appeal

Brian Vaughn Bradley Jr. (born September 27, 1996), known professionally as Stro (formerly Astro and The Astronomical Kid), is an American rapper, producer, and actor. He is known for being a contestant on the first season of The X Factor USA in 2011. Stro took the judges with his original song shot at Simon Cowell, for looking at his mom. His mentor was producer and label executive L.A. Reid. Stro was the seventh contestant eliminated in the competition. After his appearance on The X Factor, he starred in an episode of Person of Interest. In 2014, he co-starred in the major films Earth to Echo and A Walk Among the Tombstones, and the Fox series Red Band Society.

== Early life ==
Stro was born Brian Vaughn Bradley Jr. on September 27, 1996 in Brooklyn, New York. There, he lived in a single parent household with his Jamaican mother, and younger sister. He began rapping professionally at the age of ten when his mother promised him studio time if he began to do better in school. He soon released his first single, "Stop Looking at My Mom" and created his first mixtape B.O.A. (Birth of Astro). He later started composing instrumentals of his own that pertained to the hip hop music genre.

== Music career ==
=== 2011–2012: The X Factor USA and Post-X Factor ===
At the age of 14, Bradley went to audition for The X Factor. For his audition, he performed "Stop Looking at My Mom". He gained four yeses and proceeded on to the live shows. In the fourth week, he faced Stacey Francis in the sing-off but survived as Reid, Abdul and Cowell kept him. He got into the top seven before being eliminated.

=== Performances on The X Factor ===
Astro performed the following songs on The X Factor:

Show	Theme	Song	Original artist	Order	Result
Audition	Free Choice	"Stop Looking at My Mom"	Self-written	N/A	Through to bootcamp
Bootcamp 1	Group performance 1				Advanced
Bootcamp 2	Group performance 2	"Wishing On a Star" (with Tinuke Oyefule, Jennifay Nichols, Lauren Ashley and Tatiana "Reina" Williams)	Jay-Z		Advanced
Bootcamp 3	Solo performance	Not aired		N/A	Through to judges' houses
Judges' houses	Free choice	"Can't Nobody Hold Me Down"	Puff Daddy feat. Mase		Advanced
Live show 1	Free choice	"Jump"	Kris Kross	1	Safe
Live show 2	Free choice	"Hip Hop Hooray", "Get Ur Freak On"	Naughty by Nature/Missy Elliott	8	Safe
Live show 3	Songs from Movies	"Lose Yourself"	Eminem	6	Safe
Live show 4	Rock	"I'll Be Missing You"	Puff Daddy feat. Faith Evans and 112	7	Saved by judges' vote
Live show 5	Giving Thanks	"Show Me What You Got"	Jay-Z	7	Safe
Live show 6	Songs by Michael Jackson	"Black or White"	Michael Jackson	2	Eliminated

After leaving The X Factor, Stro released his fourth mixtape entitled Loser. It was based around his experiences on the show. He also put out two beat tapes called "Masterminds" and "New World Art" under the alias of Basquiat. The tapes included productions from both him and his friend Laron (a.k.a. ThatLoserLaron) who went under the name of Keith for the tapes.

He was then nominated for a BET Award in the Young Stars category, asked to present an award at the 43rd Annual NAACP Image Award Show with Keke Palmer, and featured in an episode of Person of Interest.

He put out many singles. One of them was "Stop Looking at My Mom", released under the name The Astronomical Kid. The music video was released on YouTube.

=== 2013–present: Deadbeats & Lazy Lyrics and Starvin' Like Marvin ===
For most of 2012, Bradley went on a hiatus. When in an interview with Sway, he mentioned that he used this time to find himself, musically. He returned releasing a song called "Deadbeat" and another called "Methods", then releasing a visual to his song "He Fell Off". Those songs were all included on his mixtape Deadbeats & Lazy Lyrics. He made sure to state that the tape would be nothing like what he has done before with a "gritty hip-hop sound that oozed Brooklyn."

== Acting career ==
Bradley made his acting debut with his role as Darren McGrady in Person of Interest. He then played Tucker "Tuck" Simms in the sci-fi adventure Earth to Echo, which was released on July 2, 2014, and TJ in A Walk Among the Tombstones, a film with Liam Neeson, released on September 19, 2014. He was Dash Hosney in the FOX series Red Band Society, which premiered on September 17, 2014. Most recently, he played Calvin Walker in See You Yesterday, an afrofuturist take on ways that time travel can change the effects of police brutality. See You Yesterday was produced by Spike Lee and directed by Stefon Bristol, and debuted on Netflix on May 17. 2019.

In June 2019, The Hollywood Reporter stated that Bradley was originally set to play Christopher McKay in HBO's Euphoria, but left the show during filming due to its explicit content and was subsequently replaced with Earth to Echo co-star Algee Smith.

== Discography ==
=== Albums ===
- Grade A Frequencies (2017)
- Back On Saratoga (2020)
- Everywhere Your Not (2021) (instrumental production album collaborated alongside Mixsa)

=== Extended plays ===
- The Astronomical Kid - EP (2009)
- Computer Era (2014)
- Nice 2 Meet You, Again (2018)
- Last Friday (2019)
- T.H.U.G.S (2026)

=== Singles ===
Year	Title	Album or EP
2010	"Stop Looking at My Mom"	The Astronomical Kid
2014	"Champion"	Computer Era
2015	"Mighty Healthy '16"	Mighty Healthy '16
2017	"Cut That Sh*t Off"	Cut That Sh*t Off
2017	"Apollonia"	Apollonia
2017	"From Me"	Grade A Frequencies
2017	"Aura"	Grade A Frequencies
2018	"Waters"	Nice 2 Meet You, Again
2019	"I'm Up"	Last Friday
2019	"Mansions"	Last Friday
2020	"Lace Up" (featuring Dave East)	Back on Saratoga

=== Features ===
Year	Title	Artist	Peak chart positions	
Year	Title	Artist	US	CAN
2009	"Hang On"	Sha Stimuli	—	—
2012	"Want U Back (UK Version)"	Cher Lloyd	12	11
2012	"Ghostin'"	Torion	—	—
2013	"Workaholics"	Curtiss King	—	—
2013	"Who's Next?"	Shadow the Great	—	—
2014	"Out Here Gettin' Money"	Termanology	—	—
2014	"Around the World"	Ransom	—	—
2016	"Every Damn Dolla"	Ill Neil	—	—
2016	"3 Man Weave"	Logan Cage	—	—
2016	"New York Nights"	Taylor Bennet	—	—
2018	"Flights"	LNDN DRGS, Jay Worthy	—	—

== Filmography ==
=== Film ===
Year	Name	Role	Notes
2014	Earth to Echo	Tucker "Tuck" Simms	
2014	A Walk Among the Tombstones	TJ	as Brian 'Astro' Bradley
2016	Billy Lynn's Long Halftime Walk	Lodis	
2019	Luce	DeShaun Meeks	
2019	See You Yesterday	Calvin Walker	as Brian 'Stro' Bradley

=== Television ===
Year	Name	Role	Notes
2011	The X Factor	Himself	Contestant: seventh place
2012	Person of Interest	Darren McGrady	Episode, "Wolf and Cub"
2014–2015	Red Band Society	Dash Hosney	Main role
2019	Bull	Darius Lambert	Episode: "Forfeiture"; as Brian Bradley
2020	FBI: Most Wanted	Anttwon Perry	Episode: "Caesar"; as Brian Bradley Jr.

== Awards and nominations ==
Year	Result	Award	Notes	Ref.
2012	Won	BET Award	BET Young Stars Award	
