= List of awards and nominations received by Alan Walker =

Alan Walker awards and nominations
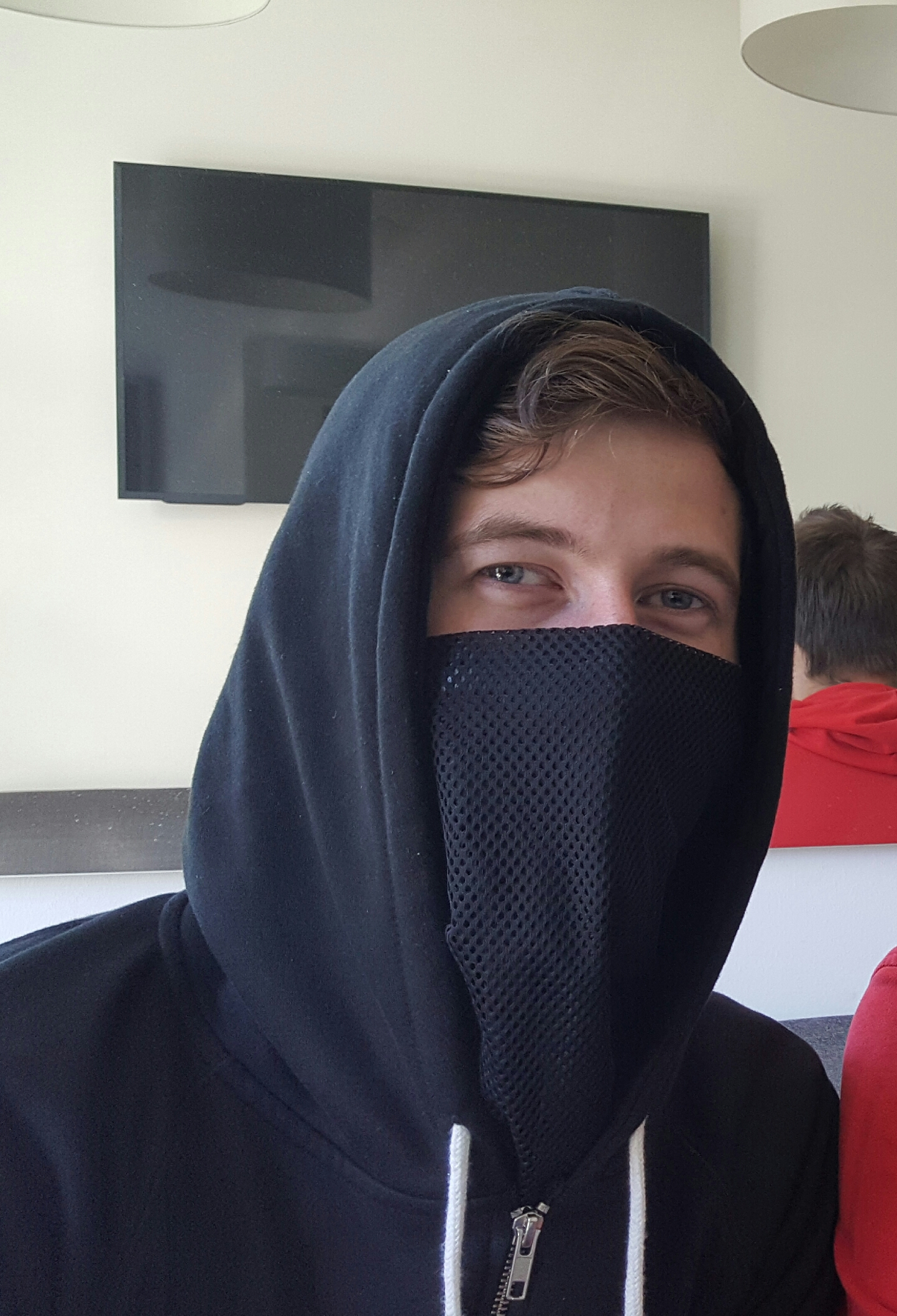
- Walker during an interview in Germany
Awards and nominations
Award	Wins	Nominations
Billboard	0	1
Brit	0	1
Echo	0	2
MTV Europe	3	4
NRJ	1	1
Gullsnutten	2	2
P3 Gull	0	2
Cannes Lions International Festival of Creativity	1	1
Eska Music Awards	1	1
EBBA Awards	1	2
Spellemannprisen	2	6
KKBox Music Awards	2	2
WDM Radio Awards	1	4
Swiss Music Awards	1	1
Berlin Music Video Awards	0	2
Music Norway	1	1
International Dance Music Awards	1	1
Electronic Dance Music Awards	4	10

Totals (Note: Certain award groups do not simply award one winner. They acknowledge several different recipients, have runners-up, and have third place. Since this is a specific recognition and is different from losing an award, runner-up mentions are considered wins in this award tally. For simplification and to avoid errors, each award in this list has been presumed to have had a prior nomination.)
- Wins: 21
- Nominations: 44

This is a list of awards and nominations received by Norwegian music producer and DJ Alan Walker. Walker has received a total of 20 awards from 40 nominations across various international and national music awards. Notably, at the MTV Europe Music Awards, he has won the Best Norwegian Act award three times from four nominations. At the Spellemannprisen, he has received two awards from six nominations, including the Årets Låt (Song of the Year) and Årets Spellemann (Spellemann of the Year). He has also won four awards from ten nominations at the Electronic Dance Music Awards (EDMAs), including the Album Of The Year.

In addition, Walker won the Årets Norske Låt (Norwegian Song of the Year) at the NRJ Music Awards Norge. His single "Faded" received awards at the Cannes Lions International Festival of Creativity and the Eska Music Awards, including Best International Hit. He has also received awards at the EBBA Awards, Swiss Music Awards, and the International Dance Music Awards (IDMAs). He has additionally been nominated once each for a Billboard Music Awards and a Brit Awards, and twice each for the Echo Music Prize and Berlin Music Video Awards.

== Awards and nominations ==
Award	Year	Category	Recipient(s)	Result	Ref.
Billboard Music Awards	2020	Top Dance/Electronic Album	Different World	Nominated	
Berlin Music Video Awards	2017	Best Editor	"Sing Me to Sleep" (music video)	Nominated	
Berlin Music Video Awards	2019	Best Cinematography	"Diamond Heart" (music video)	Nominated	
Brit Awards	2017	Song of the Year	"Faded"	Nominated	
Cannes Lions International Festival of Creativity	2016	The Cannes Lions Award	"Faded"	Won	
Clio Awards	2026	Music Marketing: Social Media	Alan Walker - From Classroom to Center Stage	Bronze	
EBBA Awards by Eurosonic Noorderslag	2016	European Border Breakers Award	Alan Walker	Won	
EBBA Awards by Eurosonic Noorderslag	2017	Public Choice Award	Alan Walker	Nominated	
Echo Awards	2017	Best International Newcomer	Alan Walker	Nominated	
Echo Awards	2017	Song of the Year	"Faded"	Nominated	
Electronic Dance Music Awards	2022	Dance Song of The Year (Radio)	"Sweet Dreams" (shared with Imanbek)	Nominated	
Electronic Dance Music Awards	2024	Male Artist Of The Year	Alan Walker	Nominated	
Electronic Dance Music Awards	2024	Album Of The Year	Walkerworld	Won	
Electronic Dance Music Awards	2024	Best Fan Army	Walkers	Won	
Electronic Dance Music Awards	2024	Best Instrumental Non-Vocal Release	"Dreamer"	Won	
Electronic Dance Music Awards	2025	Best Fan Army	Walkers	Nominated	
Electronic Dance Music Awards	2026	Favorite Album	Quantum Beats	Nominated	
Electronic Dance Music Awards	2026	Best Collaboration	"Welcome to Lonely Club" (shared with Steve Aoki)	Nominated	
Electronic Dance Music Awards	2026	Best Fan Army	Walkers	Won	
Electronic Dance Music Awards	2026	Best Performance	Tomorrowland Belgium 2025	Nominated	
Eska Music Awards	2016	Best International Hit	"Faded"	Won	
Gullsnutten	2016	Årets Musikk (Music of the Year)	Alan Walker	Won	
Gullsnutten	2017	Årets Musikk (Music of the Year)	Alan Walker	Won	
International Dance Music Awards	2018	Best Breakthrough Artist	Alan Walker	Won	
KKBox Music Awards	2017	Best Western Artist of the Year	Alan Walker	Won	
KKBox Music Awards	2017	Best Western Single of the Year	"Faded"	Won	
MTV Europe Music Awards	2016	Best Norwegian Act	Alan Walker	Won	
MTV Europe Music Awards	2017	Best Norwegian Act	Alan Walker	Won	
MTV Europe Music Awards	2018	Best Norwegian Act	Alan Walker	Won	
MTV Europe Music Awards	2019	Best Norwegian Act	Alan Walker	Nominated	
NRJ Music Awards Norge	2016	Årets Norske Låt (Norwegian Song of the Year)	"Sing Me to Sleep"	Won	
P3 Gull	2016	Årets Nykommer (Newcomer of the Year)	Alan Walker	Nominated	
P3 Gull	2016	Årets Låt (Song of the Year)	"Faded"	Nominated	
Spellemannprisen	2017	Årets Låt (Song of the Year)	"Faded"	Won	
Spellemannprisen	2018	Årets Låt (Song of the Year)	"Alone"	Nominated	
Spellemannprisen	2019	Årets Låt (Song of the Year)	"Darkside" (shared with Tomine Harket & Au/Ra)	Nominated	
Spellemannprisen	2019	Årets Låt (Song of the Year)	"Ignite" (shared with K-391, Julie Bergan & Seungri)	Nominated	
Spellemannprisen	2019	Årets Spellemann (Spellemann of the Year)	Alan Walker	Won	
Spellemannprisen	2020	Årets Låt (Song of the Year)	"Alone, Pt. II" (shared with Ava Max)	Nominated	
Spellemann and Music Norway	2017	Eksportprisen '16 (The Export Prize '16)	Alan Walker	Won	
Swiss Music Awards	2017	Best International Hit	"Faded"	Won	
WDM Radio Awards	2017	Best New Talent	Alan Walker	Won	
WDM Radio Awards	2018	Best Bass Track	"All Falls Down" (shared with Noah Cyrus & Digital Farm Animals)	Nominated	
WDM Radio Awards	2018	Best Trending Track	"Tired"	Nominated	
WDM Radio Awards	2018	Best Remix	"Issues"	Nominated	

== Other accolades ==
=== DJ Magazine Top 100 DJs ===
Year	Position	Notes	Ref.
2016	55	New Entry	
2017	17	Up 38	
2018	36	Down 19	
2019	27	Up 9	
2020	26	Up 1	
2021	22	Up 4	
2022	17	Up 5	
2023	11	Up 6	
2024	13	Down 2	
2025	24	Down 11	

=== Listicles ===
Name of publisher, name of listicle, year(s) listed, and placement result
Publisher	Listicle	Year(s)	Result	Ref.
Billboard	Billboard Dance’s 15 Artists to Watch in 2017	2017	Placed	
Billboard	Billboard 21 Under 21	2017	13th	
Billboard	Billboard’s 50 Best Dance/Electronic Songs of 2017	2017	17th ("Tired")	
Billboard	Billboard Dance 100 Artists of 2018	2018	33rd	
Billboard	Billboard Dance 100 Artists of 2019	2019	32nd	
Dancing Astronaut	Dancing Astronaut’s Top 100 Songs of the Decade	2020	78th ("Faded")	
Forbes	30 Under 30 Europe	2025	Placed	
Nettavisen	The 100 Best Norwegian Hit Songs Ever	2024	19th ("Faded")	
Spin	The 50 Best EDM Songs You've Heard at Every Summer Festival	2017	10th ("Faded")	
Vice	The 101 Best EDM Songs of All Time	2017	93rd ("Faded")	

=== State and cultural honors ===
Name of country, year given, and name of honor
Country	Year	Honor	Ref.
Norway	2019	Bergen Walk of Fame	
