= Walkerverse: The Tour =

2022–2023 concert tour by Alan Walker

Walkerverse World Tour
- Tour by Alan Walker
- Associated album: Walkerverse Pt. I & II
- Start date: 9 September 2022
- End date: 17 September 2023

Alan Walker concert chronology
- Aviation Tour (2019); Walkerverse World Tour (2022–2023); Walkerworld Tour (2024–2025)

Walkerverse: The Tour is a concert tour by Norwegian music producer and DJ Alan Walker in support of his third studio album Walkerverse Pt. I & II (2022).

== Background ==
The Walkerverse: The Tour began in September 2022. The tour kicked off in the UK in September and ended in December in San Francisco, California, playing 29 dates and hitting large venues such as Washington D.C.'s Echo Stage, Chicago's Radius, and San Francisco's Bill Graham Civic Auditorium. A tour teaser for Walkerverse Tour 2022 was also released.

The tour doubled its concert dates in three cities after the first performance sold out. A second performance took place in Brooklyn on 10 November, followed by additional performances in Vancouver on 24 November and Los Angeles on 1 December. "Dear Walker, I finally had the opportunity to play some of the songs I've been working on over the past few months and reunite with some of you," Walker previously wrote about the tour. "Today we'd like to give you a glimpse of what we have in store for us this year. We look forward to embarking on a new tour and reuniting once again. See you soon."

== Set list ==
1. "Alone"
2. "Get Down"
3. "Different World"
4. "Tired"
5. "Put Ya Fuckin Hands Up"
6. "Not You"
7. "Heading Home"
8. "Diamond Heart"
9. "Are You Lonely"
10. "Lonely"
11. "Sweet Dreams"
12. "The Drum"
13. "Extremes"
14. "Somebody Like U"
15. "Play"
16. "Sing Me to Sleep"
17. "Hello World"
18. "Alone, Pt. II"
19. "PS5"
20. "Lily"
21. "The Spectre"
22. "All Falls Down"
23. "Time"
24. "Ignite"
25. "Man on the Moon"
26. "On My Way"
27. "Darkside"
28. "Faded"

== Tour dates ==
List of concerts
Date	City	Country	Venue
9 September 2022	Singapore		Sands Expo and Convention Centre
10 September 2022 (Note: The concert in Kuching on 10 September 2022 was part of the Borneo Music Festival.)	Kuching	Malaysia	Sarawak Cultural Village
14 September 2022	Seoul	South Korea	Jamsil Indoor Stadium
23 September 2022	Hyderabad	India	Sunburn Arena Hyderabad
24 September 2022	Chennai	India	Sunburn Arena Chennai
26 September 2022	Ahmedabad	India	Sunburn Arena Ahmedabad
28 September 2022	Manchester	England	Manchester Academy
28 September 2022	London	England	O2 Academy Brixton
1 October 2022	Merksem	Belgium	Lotto Arena
6 October 2022	Hamburg	Germany	Sporthalle Hamburg
7 October 2022	Düsseldorf	Germany	Mitsubishi Electric Halle
8 October 2022	Kraków	Poland	Tauron Arena
12 October 2022	Vienna	Austria	St Marx Hallen
14 October 2022	Zürich	Switzerland	Halle 622
15 October 2022	Milan	Italy	Fabrique
19 October 2022	Amsterdam	Netherlands	AFAS Live
20 October 2022	Paris	France	Zenith
21 October 2022	Esch-sur-Alzette	Luxembourg	Rockhal
22 October 2022	Frankfurt	Germany	Jahrhunderthalle
3 November 2022	Dallas	United States	South Side Ballroom
4 November 2022	Austin	United States	Concourse
5 November 2022	Houston	United States	Bayou Music Center
8 November 2022	Atlanta	United States	Buckhead Theater
9 November 2022	Washington D.C.	United States	Echostage
10 November 2022	Brooklyn	United States	The Great Hall, Avant Gardner
11 November 2022	Brooklyn	United States	The Great Hall, Avant Gardner
15 November 2022	Boston	United States	House of Blues
16 November 2022	Montreal	Canada	MTELUS
17 November 2022	Montreal	Canada	MTELUS
18 November 2022	Toronto	Canada	REBEL
19 November 2022	Chicago	United States	Radius
24 November 2022	Vancouver	Canada	Harbour Event & Convention Centre
25 November 2022	Vancouver	Canada	Harbour Event & Convention Centre
26 November 2022	Portland	United States	Roseland Theater
29 November 2022	Denver	United States	Mission Ballroom
1 December 2022	Los Angeles	United States	Hollywood Palladium
2 December 2022	Los Angeles	United States	Hollywood Palladium
3 December 2022	San Francisco	United States	Bill Graham Civic Auditorium
6 January 2023	Lantau Island	Hong Kong	Asia-World Arena
15 July 2023	Lantau Island	Hong Kong	Asia-World Arena
17 September 2023	Kuala Lumpur	Malaysia	Axiata Arena
