= Walkerworld 2.0 =

Studio album by Alan Walker
- Released: 10 January 2025
- Label: Kreatell Music
- Producers: Alan Walker (exec.); Gunnar Greve (exec.); kasper; STATE; Jesper Borgen; Mood Melodies; Michael Fatkin; William Wiik Larsen; Digital Farm Animals; Joey Parki; Carl Hovind; Jon Bellion; Pete Nappi; Tenroc; Chris "Tek" O'Ryan; Vishal Mishra; Jon Letzig; Steve Aoki; Vikkstar; Dash Berlin

Alan Walker chronology
Neon Nights (2024)	Walkerworld 2.0 (2025)	World of Walker, Season One: Rise of the Drones (2026)

Singles from Walkerworld 2.0
- 1. "Fire" Released: 22 December 2023; 2. "Who I Am" Released: 5 January 2024; 3. "Unsure" Released: 3 May 2024; 4. "Barcelona" Released: 14 June 2024; 5. "Thick of It All" Released: 6 September 2024; 6. "Children of the Sun" Released: 27 September 2024; 7. "Avalon" Released: 11 November 2024; 8. "Dancing in Love" Released: 20 December 2024

Walkerworld 2.0 is the fifth studio album by Norwegian DJ and record producer Alan Walker. The album was released on 10 January 2025 and peaked at number 17 on the Norwegian VG-lista album chart.

Eight songs, (tracks 15 through 22) were previously released on Walkerworld in 2023.

== Track listing ==
Walkerworld 2.0 track listing
No.	Title	Writer(s)	Producer(s)	Length
1.	"Old Habits"	Alan Walker; Gunnar Greve Pettersen; Jesper Borgen; Anders Frøen; Marcus Arnbekk; Fredrik Borch Olsen; Mats Lie Skåre; Sarah Blanchard; Sophie Tweed-Simmons	Walker; kasper; Borgen; Mood Melodies	2:48
2.	"Last Song" (with Faouzia)	Walker; Pettersen; Arnbekk; Olsen; Skåre; Edvard Normann; Kristoffer Haugan; Tweed-Simmons; Michael Fatkin; Faouzia Ouihya	Walker; kasper; STATE; Fatkin; Borgen	2:33
3.	"Incommunicado" (with AR/CO)	Pettersen; Arnbekk; Olsen; Skåre; Eagle-Eye Cherry; Jamie Hartman; Mali-Koa Hood; Leo Stannard; Toby Le Messurier Scott; Paul Harris	Walker; kasper	2:58
4.	"War Paint" (with Voli Contra)	Walker; Pettersen; Arnbekk; Olsen; Skåre; William Wiik Larsen; Douglas "Voli" Martung; Fabbien Nahaounou	Walker; kasper; Larsen	3:08
5.	"Barcelona" (with Ina Wroldsen)	Walker; Pettersen; Nicholas Gale; Arnbekk; Olsen; Skåre; Ina Wroldsen	Walker; kasper; Digital Farm Animals	3:25
6.	"Avalon" (with Anne Gudrun)	Walker; Pettersen; Borgen; Lars Rosness; Arnbekk; Olsen; Skåre; Normann; Haugan; Jonathan Haugen; Tweed-Simmons	Walker; kasper; STATE	2:16
7.	"Who I Am" (with Putri Ariani and Peder Elias)	Walker; Pettersen; Arnbekk; Olsen; Skåre; Christian Hartmann	Walker; kasper	3:13
8.	"By Your Side" (with The Walkers)	Walker; Pettersen; Arnbekk; Olsen; Skåre; The Walkers	Walker; kasper; Joey Parki^{[c]}	2:40
9.	"Dancing in Love" (with MEEK)	Walker; Pettersen; Arnbekk; Olsen; Skåre; Nathan Nicholson; Andrew Bullimore; Lewis Jankel; Georgia Meek	Walker; kasper; Carl Hovind	2:36
10.	"Thick of It All" (with Joe Jonas and Julia Michaels)	Walker; Pettersen; Arnbekk; Olsen; Skåre; Julia Michaels; Jonathan Bellion; Peter Nappi; Jason "Tenroc" Cornet	Walker; Jon Bellion; Nappi; Tenroc; Chris "Tek" O'Ryan^{[v]}	3:19
11.	"Fire!" (with Yuqi and Jvke)	Walker; Pettersen; Arnbekk; Olsen; Skåre; Helge Moen; Jim Bergsted; Jacob Lawson; Zachary Lawson	Walker; kasper	2:03
12.	"Unsure" (with Kylie Cantrall)	Walker; Skåre; Normann; Haugan; Jordan Miller	Walker; STATE	2:48
13.	"Children of the Sun" (with Pritam and Vishal Mishra)	Walker; Pettersen; Arnbekk; Olsen; Skåre; Kent Sundberg; Cato Sundberg; Pritam Chakraborty	Walker; kasper; Pritam Chakraborty	3:17
14.	"Old Habits"	Walker; Pettersen; Arnbekk; Olsen; Skåre; Tweed-Simmons	Walker; kasper	2:48
15.	"Spectrum"	Pettersen; Arnbekk; Olsen; Skåre; Cherry; Hartman; Hood; Stannard; Scott; Harris	Walker; kasper; Jon Letzig	1:32
16.	"Heart Over Mind" (with Daya)	Walker; Pettersen; Carl Hovind; Arnbekk; Olsen; Skåre; Kristin Carpenter	Walker; kasper	3:09
17.	"Spectre 2.0" (with Steve Aoki and Lonely Club)	Walker; Pettersen; Steven Aoki; Borgen; Frøen; Lars Rosnes; Arnbekk; Olsen; Skåre; Normann; Haugan; Thomas La Verdi	Walker; kasper; STATE; Steve Aoki	2:56
18.	"Better Off (Alone, Pt. III)" (with Dash Berlin and Vikkstar)	Walker; Pettersen; Vikram Singh Barn; Arnbekk; Olsen; Skåre; Ida Martinsen Botten; Eelke Kalberg; Sebastiaan Molijn	Walker; kasper; Vikkstar; Dash Berlin	2:31
19.	"Endless Summer" (with Zak Abel)	Walker; Pettersen; Arnbekk; Olsen; Skåre; Zachary Zilesnik; Oliver "OJM" Marland; Ruth-Anne Cunningham; Oliver Green	Walker; kasper	3:07
20.	"Hero" (with Sasha Alex Sloan)	Walker; Pettersen; Arnbekk; Olsen; Skåre; Carpenter; Rasmus Budny	Walker; kasper	2:55
21.	"Born to Ride" (with Sophie Stray)	Walker; Pettersen; Arnbekk; Olsen; Skåre; Moa Pettersson Hammar; Lara Andersson; Gustav Landall; Simon Jonasson	Walker; kasper	2:43
22.	"Yesterday" (with Ali Gatie)	Walker; Pettersen; Arnbekk; Olsen; Skåre; Blanchard; Pablo Bowman; Richard Boardman; Aaron Hibell; Ali Ghati	Walker; kasper	2:41
23.	"Land of the Heroes" (with Sophie Stray)	Walker; Pettersen; Eriksen; Arnbekk; Olsen; Skåre; Nikman	Walker; kasper	2:56
24.	"Creator Circle"	Walker; Pettersen; Borgen; Arnbekk; Olsen; Skåre; Blanchard; Tweed-Simmons	Walker; kasper	2:49

Notes

- ^{^[c]} signifies a co-producer.
- ^{^[v]} signifies a vocal producer.
- The moniker of "kasper" is listed as a collective production alias for producers Marcus Arnbekk, Big Fred and Slipmats.

== Charts ==
Chart performance for Walkerworld 2.0
Chart (2025)	Peak position
Norwegian Albums (VG-lista)	14
