= Alan Walker =

Norwegian DJ and music producer (born 1997)

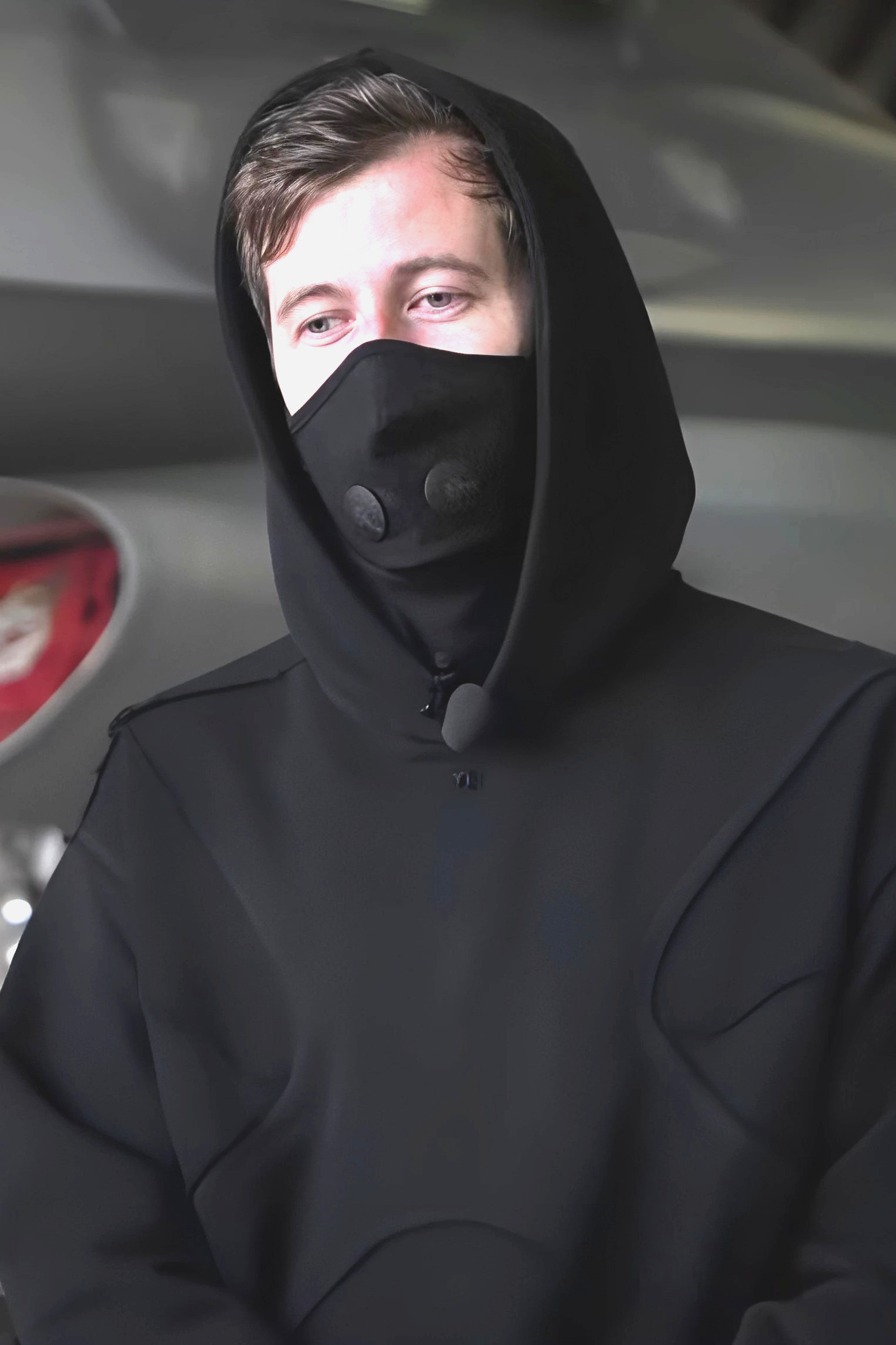
- Walker in 2024
- Born: Alan Olav Walker; 24 August 1997 (age 29); Northampton, England
- Other names: DJ Walkzz; Walkzz
- Citizenship: Norway; United Kingdom
- Occupations: DJ; record producer; YouTuber
- Agent: Gunnar Greve
- Awards: Full list
- Musical career
- Origin: Fana, Bergen, Norway
- Genres: Electro house; future house; future bass; big room house; progressive house
- Years active: 2012–present
- Labels: Kreatell (formerly MER Musikk); Sony; RCA; NCS; Ultra; Corite; Monstercat
- Website: alanwalker.com walkergaming.com worldofwalker.com

YouTube information
- Channels: Alan Walker; Walker Gaming; Alan Walker Shorts
- Years active: 2012–present
- Subscribers: 47.5 million (Alan Walker); 100 thousand (Walker Gaming); 13.7 thousand (Alan Walker Shorts)
- Last updated: 14 July 2025
- Alan Walker's voice Alan Walker talks music Recorded September 2024

Alan Olav Walker (born 24 August 1997) is a Norwegian DJ and record producer. His songs "Faded", "Sing Me to Sleep", "Alone", "All Falls Down", "Ignite", and "Darkside" have each been multi-platinum-certified and reached number 1 on the VG-lista chart in Norway. (Note: Adapted from Alan Walker discography.) Walker values his anonymity and is known to wear a hoodie and mask to remain inconspicuous. His musical style is primarily described as house music, and is characterised by emotionally rich and grandiose melodies.

Walker grew up in Fana, Bergen, Norway, and began making music around 2012. Using feedback from fans online, he later gained recognition by posting several songs on YouTube and SoundCloud. Starting out as a bedroom producer, he was better known as DJ Walkzz before signing a record deal and releasing his debut single "Fade" on NoCopyrightSounds (NCS) at the age of 17. In December 2015, his single "Faded" reached number 80 on the US Billboard Hot 100 and was certified triple platinum by the Recording Industry Association of America (RIAA). He followed it up with the singles "Sing Me to Sleep" and "Alone" in 2016, and "All Falls Down" in 2017, the latter of which reached number one on the Billboard Dance Club Songs chart.

In 2018, Walker released "Darkside" and "Ignite". A few months later, his debut studio album, Different World, topped the Norwegian and Finnish album charts, and charted in the top 20 in Sweden and Switzerland. In 2021, Walker released his second album, World of Walker. The album included the singles "On My Way" and "Alone, Pt. II", both of which reached the top five on the Norwegian VG-lista chart. The following year, he released his third album, Walkerverse Pt. I & II, and supported it with Walkerverse: The Tour, which began in September. In 2023, he released his fourth album, Walkerworld, and in 2025, he released his fifth album, Walkerworld 2.0, and, later in 2025, he collaborated with Steve Aoki to make Quantum Beats.

Walker has won three MTV Europe Music Awards, three Electronic Dance Music Awards, two Spellemannprisen and a NRJ Music Awards Norge. He has been nominated once each for a Billboard Music Awards and a Brit Awards, and twice each for the Echo Music Prize and Berlin Music Video Awards. He has also had seven number one singles on the Norwegian VG-lista charts and is considered one of the most popular Norwegian artist on the world market. Billboard ranked him 13th in their 2017 Billboard 21 Under 21, he was ranked 11th in DJ Mag's "Top 100 DJs" for 2023 and Forbes named him to their 2025 Forbes 30 Under 30 Europe list.

== Early life ==
Alan Olav Walker was born on 24 August 1997, in Northampton, England, to a British father who was a baker and Norwegian mother who worked in elderly care. Walker moved to Fana, Bergen, Norway, with his family when he was two years old. As a child, he was interested in computer games, graphic design, and programming, and spent his childhood playing with Nintendo hardware and home consoles such as the PlayStation and Nintendo GameCube.

In 2010, he went on to Danielsen Middle School, a private Christian middle school of Bergen. When he was in middle school, Walker began learning music and production through YouTube tutorials and began making music. In 2013, he went on to Danielsen High School. During high school, he often wondered whether he could pursue a career in music. After graduating, he planned to either serve in the Norwegian military or work at a nearby grocery store.

== Career ==
=== 2012–2016: Career beginnings and breakthrough ===
In 2012, Walker reached out to Italian music producer DJ Ness, inquiring how he produced his music. In July 2012, Walker began making music on his laptop using FL Studio with the help of friends he met online, and released his first song, "Celebrate" on YouTube. He subsequently posted several more songs on YouTube and SoundCloud. He was inspired by Norwegian music producer K-391 and Dutch music producer Ahrix, as well as film composers Hans Zimmer and Steve Jablonsky. Starting as a bedroom producer, Walker was better known as DJ Walkzz before he signed a record deal, releasing his debut single in 2014.

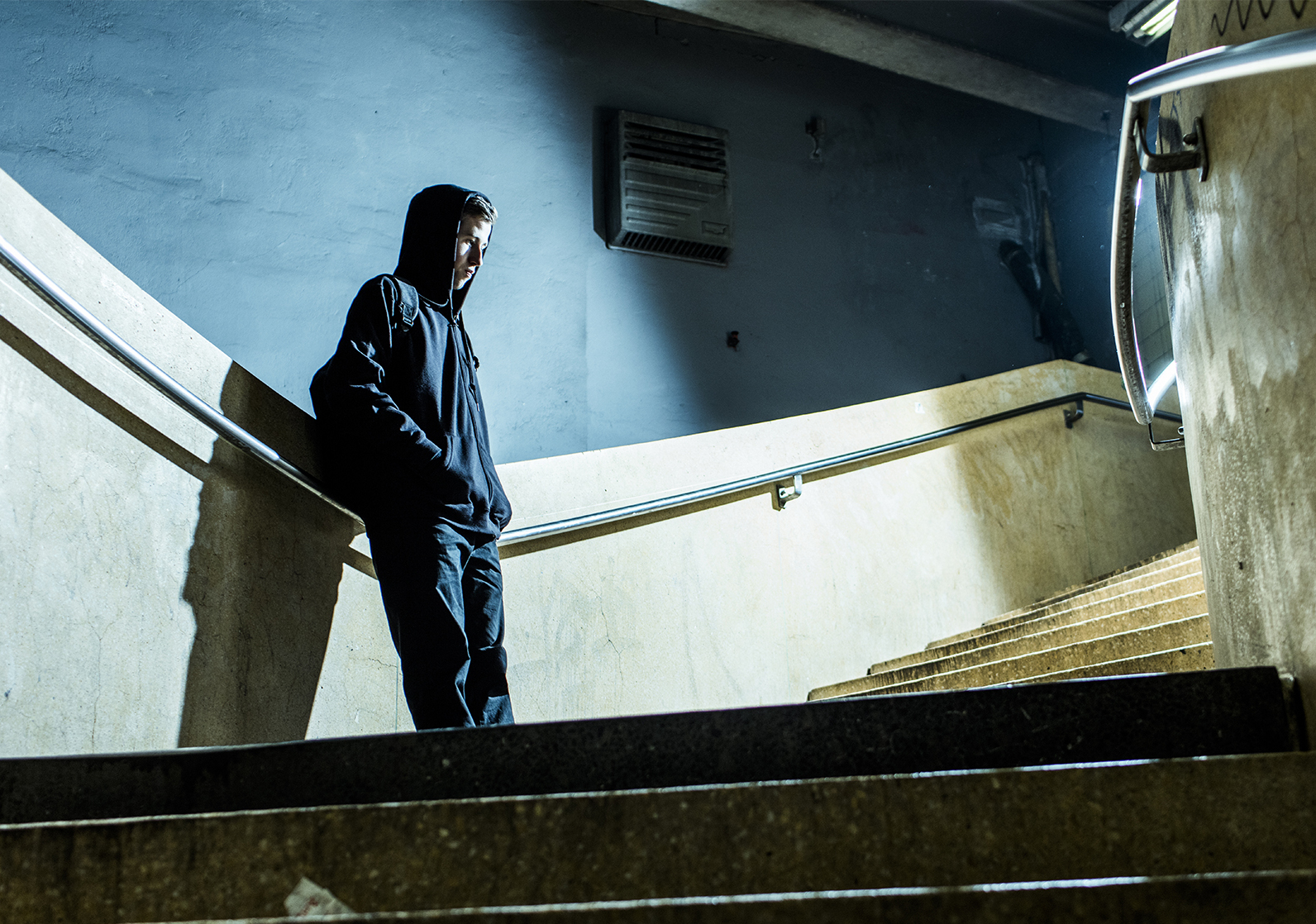
Walker in the 2015 press release photograph

In 2014, Walker released his debut single "Fade" on the British record label NoCopyrightSounds (NCS), which garnered 200 million views on YouTube between 2014 and 2015 and reached number three on the Swedish Heatseekers Chart.

Walker released "Spectre" and "Force" on NCS in 2015. He signed with MER Musikk under Sony Music Sweden and released his next single, "Faded", a remastered vocal version of "Fade", on 3 December 2015. It featured uncredited Naustdal pop singer Iselin Solheim and topped the year-end charts in Austria, Germany, Switzerland and Sweden, was nominated for British Single of the Year at the 2017 Brit Awards, and won Song of the Year at the annual Spellemannprisen. The music video on YouTube reached 1 billion views on 26 March 2017, and by March 2026, it had been viewed over 3.9 billion times, making it the 33rd most-viewed YouTube video. It also became the first EDM song to achieve 3 billion views. As of March 2025, the song has been streamed over 2.1 billion times on Spotify, and was the most Shazamed song in the world in March 2016. "Faded" received official remixes from Tiësto, Dash Berlin, and Hardwell. Walker later released an acoustic version of the song, which did not include any EDM elements.

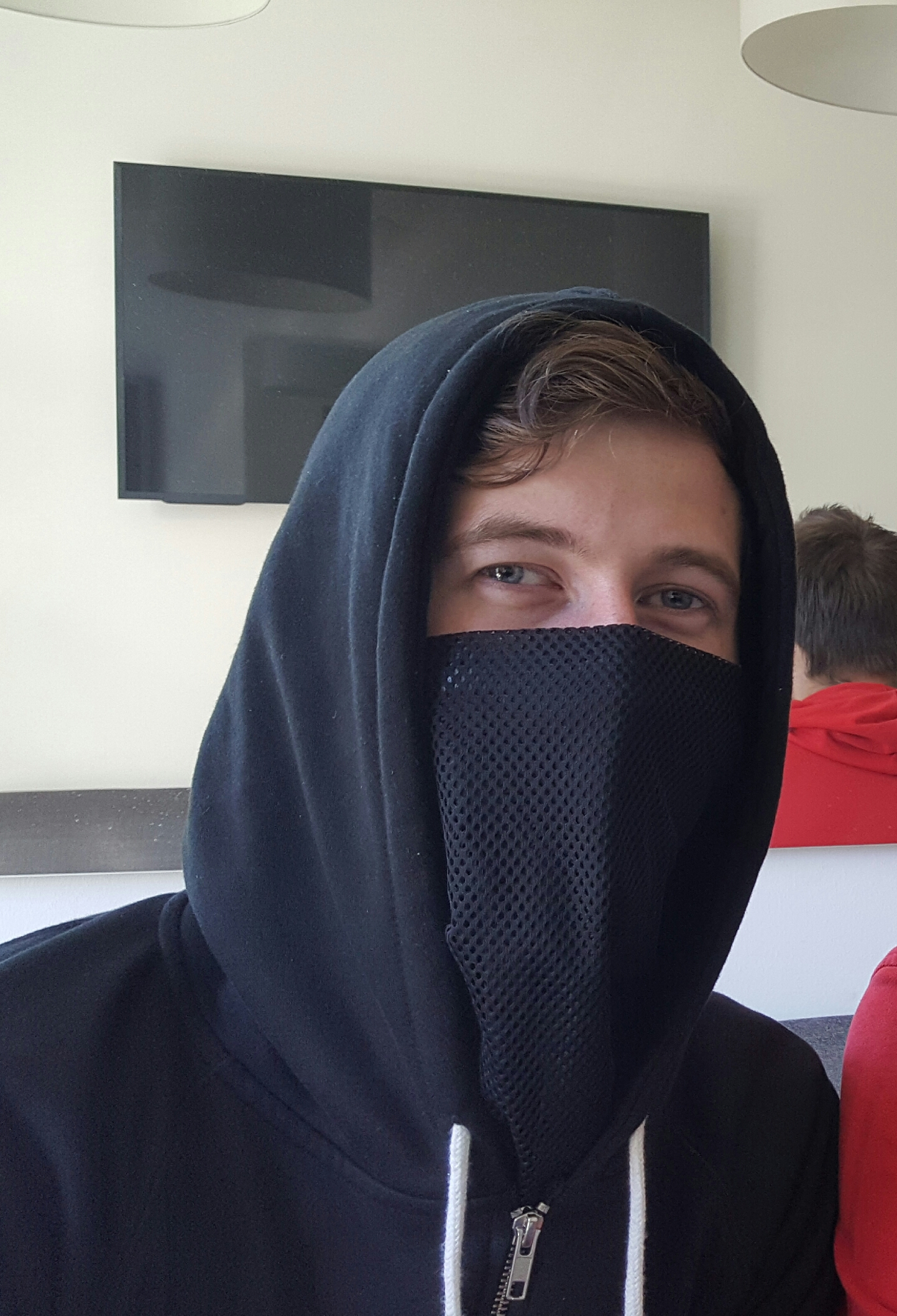
Walker being interviewed by German website Dance-Charts in 2016

After releasing "Faded" in 2015, Walker dropped out of high school. On 27 February 2016, Walker made his debut performance at the Winter X Games XIX held in Oslo. By March, Walker had produced about 30 to 40 songs in total. "Faded" marked his first single with Sony Music Sweden and was his first to attain global success. Additionally, that same month he achieved the first place on the NRJ Euro Hot 30 for the first time, which only has been achieved by one other Norwegian music producer, Kygo. On 7 April, he teamed up with Zara Larsson at the Echo Awards in Germany, where they performed each other's songs "Faded" and "Never Forget You".

The single "Sing Me to Sleep" was released in June 2016 and reached number one on the Norwegian charts, winning Norwegian Song of the Year at that year's NRJ Music Awards Norge. Two months later, a remix of this song by American DJ Marshmello was released. In July, Walker released a remix of Coldplay's "Hymn for the Weekend". In October 2016, Walker released a remix of Sia's song "Move Your Body", which was included in Sia's album This Is Acting (Deluxe Edition) (2016).

Another single titled "Alone" was also released on 2 December of the same year, featuring uncredited Swedish singer Noonie Bao. On 21 and 22 December, Walker held the concert "Alan Walker is Heading Home" in his hometown Bergen at USF Verftet, where he performed 16 songs and tracks together with singers Angelina Jordan, Marius Samuelsen, Alexandra Rotan, Yosef Wolde-Mariam, and Tove Styrke. The concert was officially live-streamed on YouTube.

=== 2017–2018: Different World ===
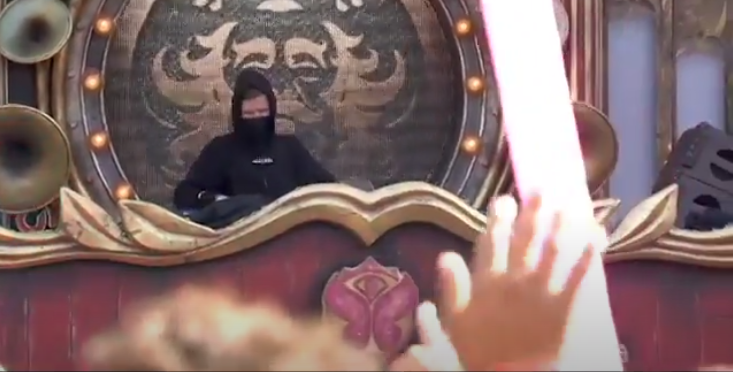
Walker at Tomorrowland 2017

At the beginning of 2017, Walker's YouTube channel became the most subscribed channel registered in Norway, after passing about 4.5 million subscribers, and had the most views among Norwegian YouTubers at around 13.9 billion views as of 12 May 2024. Between February and April, he toured around America, including attending the Euphoria Festival in Texas. In March, Walker was named one of Billboard Dance's 15 Artists to Watch in 2017. The following month, Walker released an instrumental version of the song "Ignite" featuring K-391.

On 19 May 2017, Walker released the song "Tired" featuring Irish singer-songwriter Gavin James. The song reached number 5 on the Norwegian VG-lista charts. He also joined Justin Bieber on his India leg of his Purpose World Tour in May. Succeeding "Tired", the song "Sky" with Danish music producer Alex Skrindo was released on 9 June 2017, and was part of the Insomniac Records Presents: EDC Las Vegas 2017 compilation. On 15 September 2017, Walker released "The Spectre", a vocal and instrumental remake of his 2015 song "Spectre". The song was presented at last year's "Alan Walker is Heading Home" event. The song which the remake is based on was released by Walker on NoCopyrightSounds in January 2015. That same month, Walker was ranked 13th on 2017 Billboard 21 Under 21.

Walker's single "All Falls Down", featuring American singer Noah Cyrus, British DJ and music producer Digital Farm Animals and Swedish singer Juliander, was released on 27 October. It reached number 1 on the Norwegian and the Billboard Dance Club Songs charts, and the top 5 in Sweden and Belgium. Then, on 2 December 2017, to celebrate Walker's YouTube channel reaching 10 million subscribers, a video of him performing with Noah Cyrus and Juliander at YouTube Space NY was released. On 21 October, Walker officially became the biggest climber on DJ Mag's "Top 100 DJs" list, climbing 38 places from last year's 55th place to 17th. On 31 October 2017, Riot Games released the Alan Walker remix to their League of Legends World Championship anthem "Legends Never Die", which formed a collaboration with American rock band Against the Current. On 17 November 2017, Walker released a remix of Swedish DJ Avicii's song "Lonely Together" featuring British singer Rita Ora. The remix is part of Avicii's official remix package.

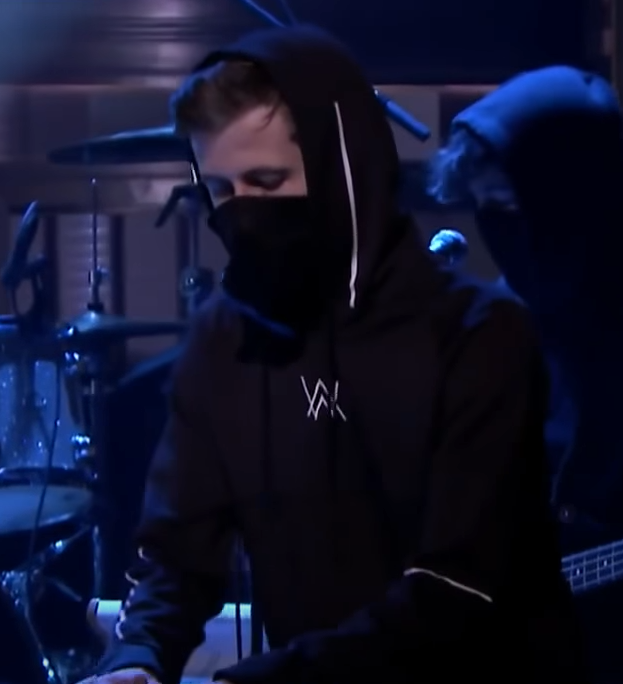
Walker at the 2018 The Tonight Show Starring Jimmy Fallon

On 11 December 2017, Walker was scheduled to perform at the Nobel Peace Prize Concert with Norwegian DJ Matoma, but on 20 November, Walker announced that he would be cancelling the performance. In a press release, his record label MER cited "high work pressures and activity levels" as the reason for the cancellation. On 15 December, Walker's single "Tired" was ranked 17th on Billboard's "50 Best Dance/Electronic Songs of 2017" list.

In January 2018, Walker appeared on The Tonight Show Starring Jimmy Fallon and performed his 2017 single "All Falls Down" with Noah Cyrus. That same month, Walker became a member of Liquid State, an EDM label jointly established by Sony Music Entertainment and Tencent Music. In March, Walker released a remix of the 2017 collaboration track "All Night" by American DJ Steve Aoki and American singer Lauren Jauregui. In the same month, he was ranked 33rd on Billboard's "Dance 100 Artists of 2018" list. In April, Walker performed at the Coachella Music Festival 2018 in Indio, California.

On 11 May, K-391 and Walker released a vocal version of their instrumental track "Ignite", which had been released the previous year, as the first collaboration with Liquid State. The vocals are by Norwegian singer Julie Bergan and South Korean singer Seungri. The song was performed at VG-lista 2018 with Julie Bergen and Norwegian rapper Vinni and reached number one on the Norwegian charts.

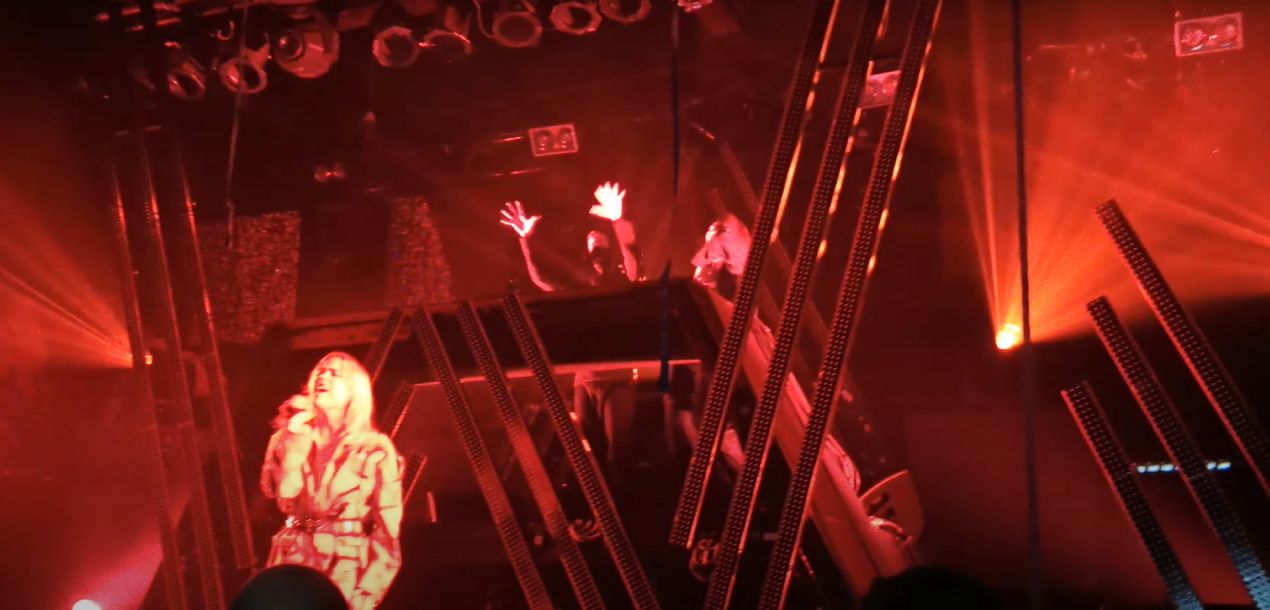
Walker at the 2018 Different World Tour

On 27 July, Walker released the song "Darkside" featuring Antiguan-German singer-songwriter Au/Ra and Norwegian singer Tomine Harket. The song reached number 1 on the Norwegian charts and number 10 on the Swedish charts. At the end of August, Walker released a remix of Chinese rapper Lay's song "Sheep" from his solo album Lay 02 Sheep. Prior to the release of the remix, Walker performed a remix of the song with Lay on 3 August 2018, at Lollapalooza in Chicago, Illinois.

The single "Diamond Heart" featuring Swedish singer-songwriter Sophia Somajo was released on 28 September 2018. The song nominated for Best Cinematography at the 2019 Berlin Music Video Awards. The single also became Walker's seventh number one single on the VG-lista chart. In November, Walker won Best Norwegian Act at the MTV Europe Music Awards, his third win since last year. In December, Walker released his debut album Different World. It included previous songs, such as "Faded" and "Alone", as well as new songs, such as "Lonely", a collaboration with American DJ Steve Aoki. The album topped the charts in Norway and Finland and was nominated for Top Dance/Electronic Album at the 2020 Billboard Music Awards.

=== 2019–2021: World of Walker, Walker Racing League and collaboration with PUBG Mobile ===
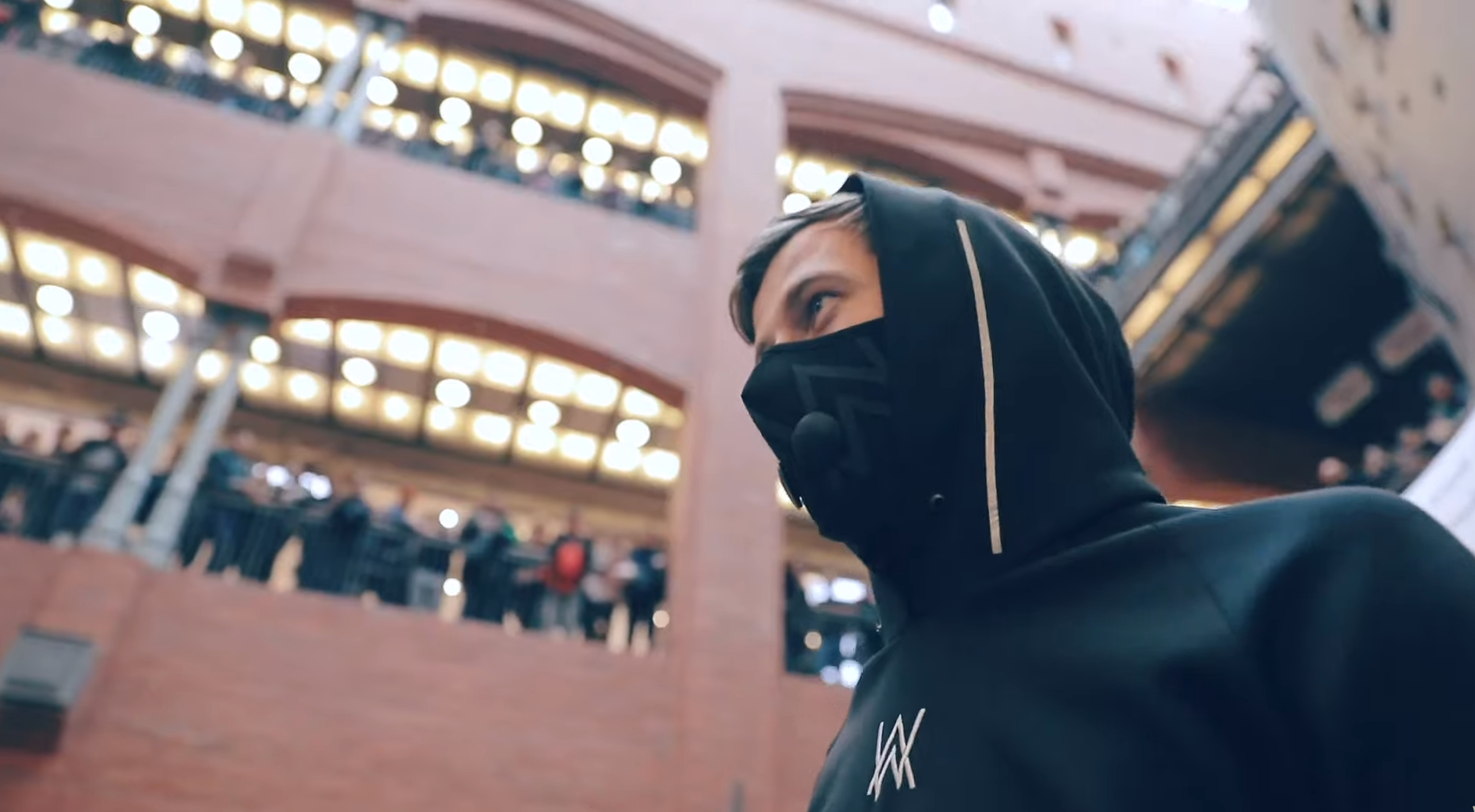
Walker in 2019

In early 2019, Walker released "Are You Lonely" with American DJ Steve Aoki featuring Norwegian band Isák, a remake of Walker's song "Lonely" from Different World.

He released the single "On My Way", a collaboration with American singer Sabrina Carpenter and Puerto Rican singer Farruko, to commemorate the first anniversary of the US-based battle royale game PUBG Mobile. A cover challenge for the song was also announced and performed during the Good Morning America summer concert series. This song peaked at number 3 on the Norwegian VG-lista chart. In April, Walker's single "Faded" surpassed one billion streams on Spotify, making him the first Norwegian artist to reach this milestone. On 25 June 2019, Walker released the song "Live Fast (PUBGM)", which is a collaboration with American rapper ASAP Rocky. The song became a track for the PUBG Mobile eighth season. Walker performed live at the PMCO Spring Split Global Finals in Berlin as a result of the collaboration.

On 30 August 2019, Walker released the single "Play", a collaboration with K-391 and Norwegian music producer Tungevaag. The song is a remake of Swedish DJ and producer Mangoo's 2000 song "Eurodancer." 3 months later, Walker launched The Walker Excavations project on mobile and on his website. The project was a game which featured Easter Eggs that teased fans of upcoming music and content.

On 7 November 2019, Walker joined Antiguan-German singer/songwriter Au/Ra on the Death Stranding: Timefall soundtrack for the action game Death Stranding and a new song from the soundtrack, "Ghost" was released. He then released "Alone, Pt. II" with American singer Ava Max. The song follows Walker's 2016 single "Alone". Numerous remixes of the song have been released, including those by Niviro, Toby Romeo, RetroVision, and Da Tweekaz, as well as Alex Skrindo's collaboration with Sebastian Wiebe. The song entered the top 10 of the charts in Belgium, Norway, Poland and Romania.

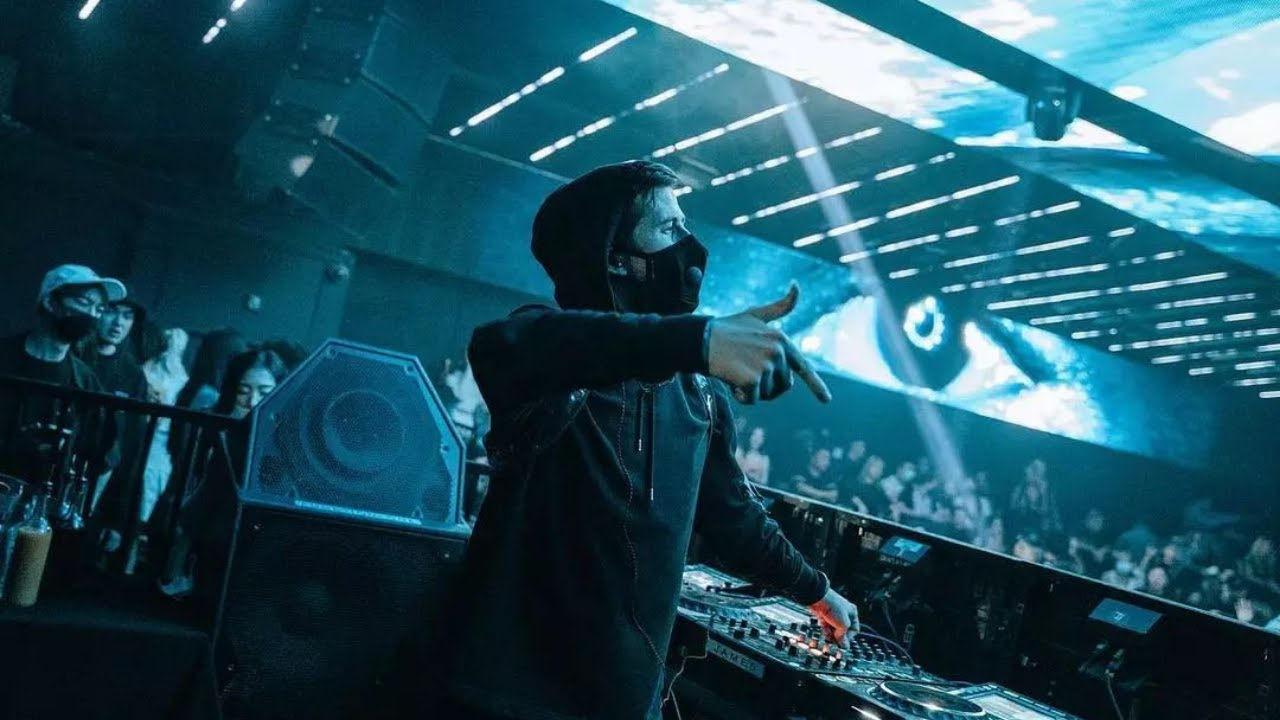
Walker at Houston Live in 2021

In 2020, Walker performed "End of Time" with K-391 and Ahrix at X Games Norway. He also appeared at Tomorrowland Around the World, the virtual replacement for Tomorrowland 2020, which was cancelled due to COVID-19. In April 2020, Walker released the single "Heading Home". The song premiered at Walker's debut live show, X Games Norway, in 2016. On 15 May 2020, Walker released a remix of Hans Zimmer's "Time" from the 2010 film Inception. The song charted in Germany Dance, Hungary, and Switzerland.

In May 2021, Walker released a concert film, "The Aviation Movie", on YouTube. The concert film is a hybrid of a concert film and a music video. In tandem with the film, he also released the app "The Aviation Game", which he co-created with indie studio Hello There Games.

On 11 June 2021, Walker released the song "Sweet Dreams", a collaboration with Kazakh record producer Imanbek. The song samples Scatman John's song "Scatman (Ski-Ba-Bop-Ba-Dop-Bop)". He also released a remix package titled "Sweet Dreams Remixes" featuring remixes by Brazilian DJ and producer Alok and Dutch DJ Brooks, among others, which reached the top 10 in the airplay charts of both Ukraine and Slovakia. The next single, "Don't You Hold Me Down", featuring English singer Georgia Ku, was released on 27 August and marked Walker's third collaboration with PUBG Mobile. The following month, the single "Paradise" with K-391 and Swedish singer-songwriter Boy in Space, also a collaboration with PUBG Mobile, reached number 31 on the Norwegian VG-lista chart.

On 18 August 2021, Walker launched the "ROG Zephyrus G14 Alan Walker Special Edition" a custom gaming laptop created in partnership with Asus and Republic of Gamers (ROG). It included Walker's logo engraved into the laptop and custom startup sounds and animations created by Walker. The collaboration also centered on Walker's single "Fake a Smile" featuring American singer Salem Ilese.

On 10 September 2021, Walker released the EP Walker Racing League. On 13 November, his contract with NoCopyrightSounds expired and his releases on the label ("Fade", "Spectre", and "Force") were removed from its catalogue and from streaming platforms. In December, Walker released his second studio album, World of Walker, consisting of 15 tracks built around electro-pop and EDM. The album reached number 6 in Norway and number 24 in Finland.

=== 2022–2023: Walkerverse Pt. I & II and Walkerworld ===
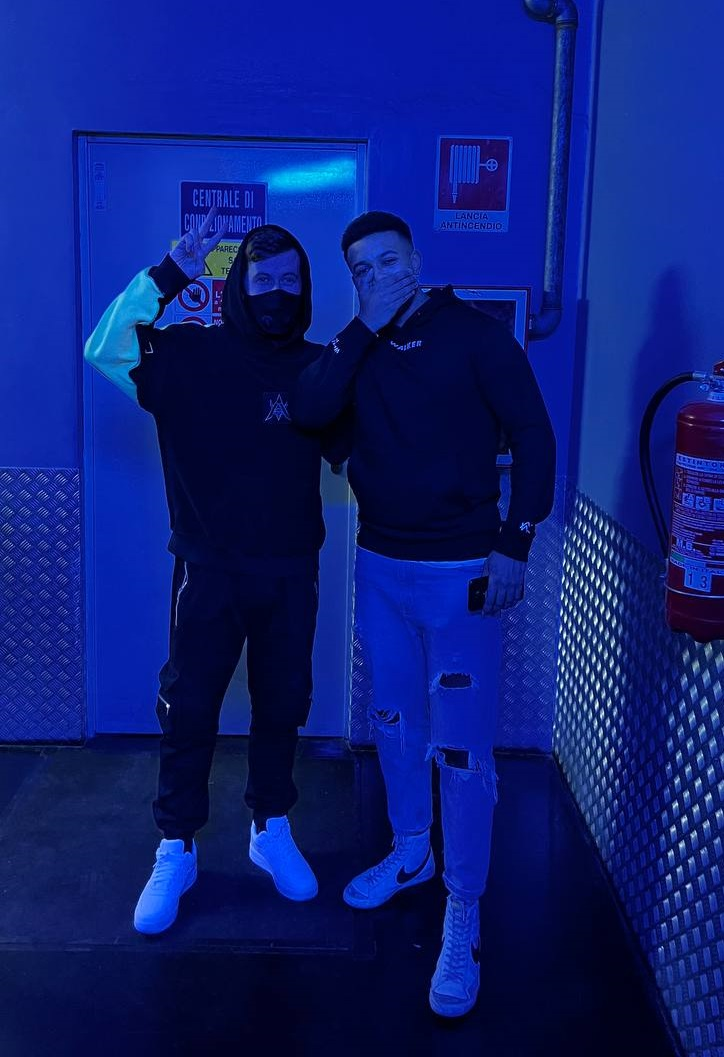
Walker in 2022

In early 2022, he collaborated with Brazilian music producer and DJ Alok to release a remix of Alok's song "Wherever You Go" featuring Swedish singer John Martin, and the single "Headlights" featuring singer Kiddo. "Headlights" was certified gold in Brazil and Poland.

In April 2022, Walker signed with the Swedish crowdfunding website Corite, raising over $100,000 from fans for his next musical projects, the first being a compilation EP called Origins, while the second was a collaboration with his online community of fans known as The Walkers, called "Unity". The following month, Walker released the single "The Drum", featuring uncredited Norwegian singer Kristin Carpenter.

His next album, Walkerverse Pt. I & II, was published in two parts and was promoted by Walkerverse: The Tour, which began in September 2022. The tour, which visited venues such as Echostage in Washington, D.C., Radius in Chicago, and the Bill Graham Civic Auditorium in San Francisco, began in the UK in September and ended in December in San Francisco, California, running for 29 shows.

In April 2023, he re-signed with NoCopyrightSounds and "Dreamer" was released. This was Walker's first NoCopyrightSounds release in eight years, and his first since his original contract expired. The song reached number 47 on the US Billboard Hot Dance/Electronic Songs charts. The next single, "Hero" with American singer Sasha Alex Sloan, was released on 4 May and reached number 1 on the Hungarian radio chart and number 18 on US Billboard Hot Dance/Electronic Songs chart.

His single with British singer Zak Abel, "Endless Summer", was released in July 2023 and ranked 10th on TikTok's "TikTok's Global Songs of the Summer 2023" list. On 28 September 2023, Walker collaborated with Dutch electronic music group Dash Berlin and English YouTuber and musician Vikkstar on the song "Better Off (Alone, Pt. III)". It is part of Walker's suite of songs including his 2016 single "Alone" and collaborative single "Alone, Pt. II".

On 10 November 2023, Walker released his fourth studio album, Walkerworld. This album includes the songs "Spectre 2.0" with Steve Aoki and "Land of The Heroes" with Sophie Stray. The album peaked at number 18 on the Norwegian VG-lista album chart. The single "Heart Over Mind", released at the same time as the album, reached number one on the Belarusian year-end charts and number two on the Russian year-end charts. That same month, Walker ranked number 11 on DJ Mag's Top 100 DJs.

=== 2024–present: Walkerworld 2.0 and Walkerworld Tour ===
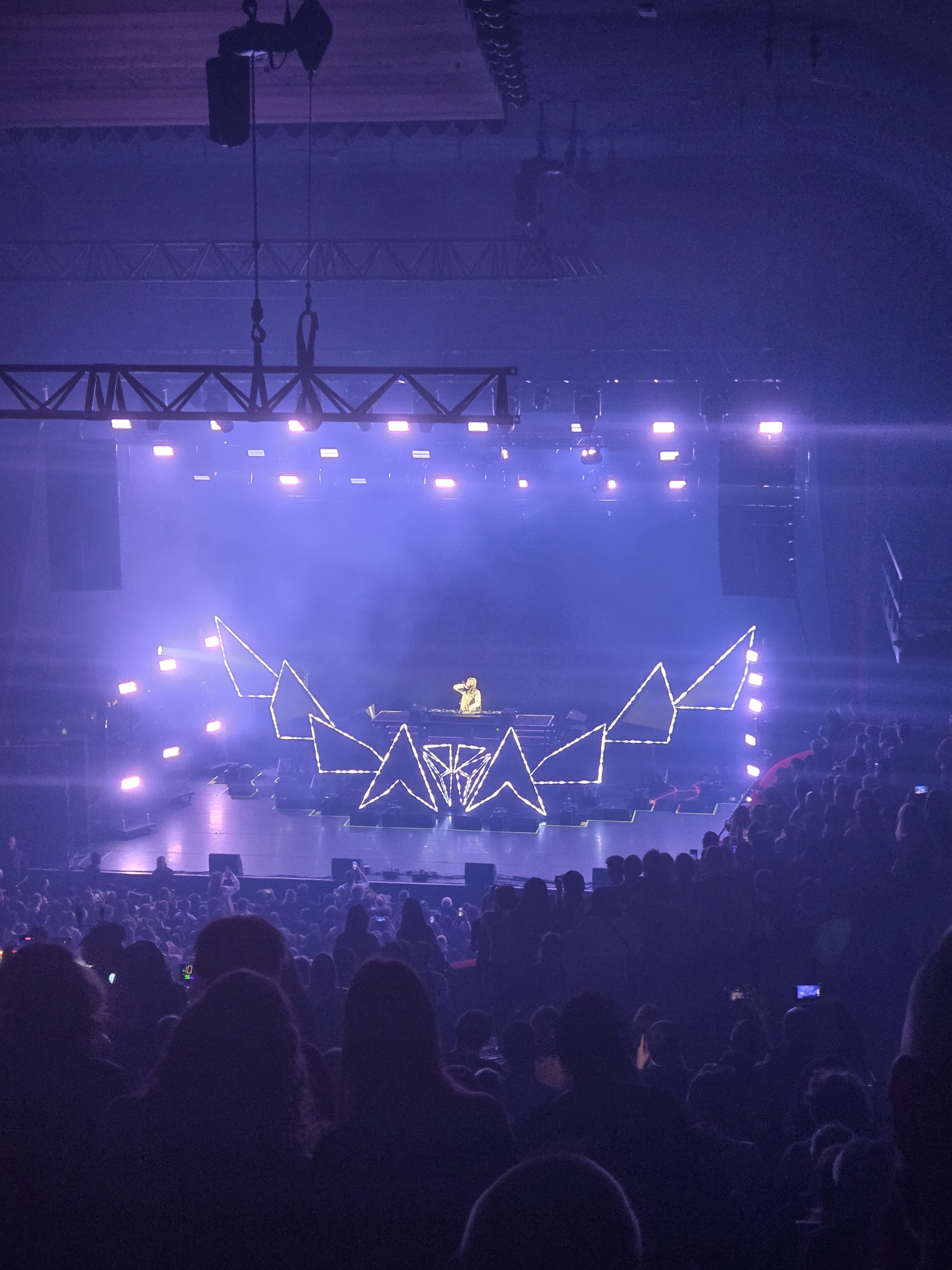
Walker at the Olympia in Paris, France on 24 March 2025

On 4 January 2024, Walker released "Who I Am" with Norwegian singer Peder Elias and Indonesian singer Putri Ariani. In March, Walker collaborated with Royal Challengers Bangalore (RCB) to release a song for the team, "Team Side" ahead of the 2024 Indian Premier League (IPL 17) season. The vocals were provided by Norwegian singer Sofiloud. On 2 May, Walker released the song "Unsure" with American singer Kylie Cantrall.

This was followed by a series of tours called "Walkerworld Tour" starting in June 2024. The first tour, "Walkerworld Asia Tour Pt. I", began in June 2024 and took place in 10 cities, including Singapore, Jakarta, Macau, and Kuala Lumpur. "Walkerworld India Tour" began in September and took place in 10 cities, including Mumbai, Bangalore, and Delhi. He also collaborated with the vehicle soccer video game Rocket League to make songs from the EP available in the game as player anthems during the in-game music festival "Neon Nights", which began on 7 August and ended on 21 August.

On 26 September, before the tour began, Walker collaborated with Indian composer Pritam on the single "Children of the Sun," released through Indian record label Warner Music India. The song also features the voice of Indian singer Vishal Mishra and incorporates a children's choir.

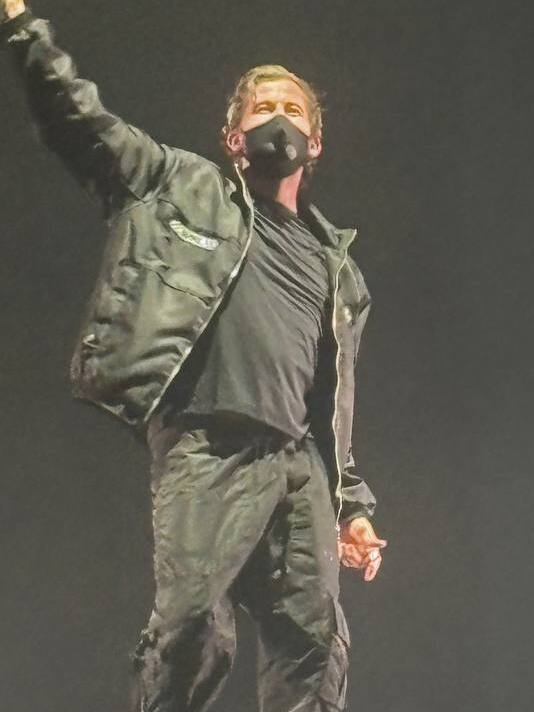
Walker at the Marina Bay Street Circuit on 4 October 2025

Walker also performed "Chal Kudiye" a collaboration between Diljit Dosanjh and Alia Bhatt from the film Jigra featuring Bhatt, during a performance in Bangalore on 4 October. Alia Bhatt then came onstage to greet Walker, which drew mixed reactions online. The tour ultimately sold approximately 120,000 tickets in nine Indian cities and grossed over $5 million, making it the highest-grossing international tour in India's history. "Walkerworld Asia Tour Pt. II" began in November, with performances in Malaysia, South Korea, and Japan.

On 10 January 2025, Walker released his fifth studio album, Walkerworld 2.0. The album peaked at number 14 on the Norwegian VG-lista album chart. That same month, Walker was also named to the Forbes 30 Under 30 Europe list. From January to February 2025, the "Walkerworld North American Tour" took place. Starting in March 2025, Walker performed in cities such as Barcelona, London, Berlin, and Paris as part of his "Walkerworld European Tour". The "Walkerworld India Pt. II" tour began in April 2025, performing in Guwahati, Bhuvaneshwar, Hyderabad, and Jaipur. On 19 April, during a performance in Bhubaneswar as part of the tour, he debuted his collaboration with Indian singer King, "Story of a Bird".

On 29 May, in an interview with Billboard, Walker announced the release of his fan app, "World of Walker" on 8 August. The app offers fans an immersive experience, premium content (including Walker's entire song and video catalogue), behind-the-scenes footage, exclusive weekly livestreams, and direct chat. On 5 August, Dagens Næringsliv reported that Walker had signed an exclusive collaboration deal with his manager Gunnar Greve until 2031. On 20 September, Walker performed at Sphere Las Vegas as the headliner for "Unity", a collaboration between American EDM event promoter Insomniac and Belgian festival Tomorrowland. On 4 October, Walker performed at the Marina Bay Street Circuit, site of the 2025 Formula One Singapore Grand Prix.

On March 27, 2026, Walker released his sixth album, World Of Walker, Season One: Rise Of The Drones, which reached number 51 on Norway's VG-lista chart. On June 26, Walker released the single "Fate", a collaboration with Ava Max. This marked his second collaboration with Max, following their 2019 single "Alone, Pt. II". In early November, he collaborated with Pakistani singer-songwriter Hamza Malik, Pakistani music group Zain Zohaib, and British singer James Arthur to release "Alfaaz (Alan Walker Relight)", a remix version of the song "Alfaaz" by Hamza Malik and Zain Zohaib. On the 9th of the same month, he announced that he would release a song titled "Yume" on November 20th, featuring Raul—a member of the Japanese idol group Snow Man. This marked his first-ever collaboration with a Japanese artist. On the same day as the release, he also appeared on TV Asahi’s Music Station and performed the song alongside Raul.

== Artistry ==
=== Influences ===
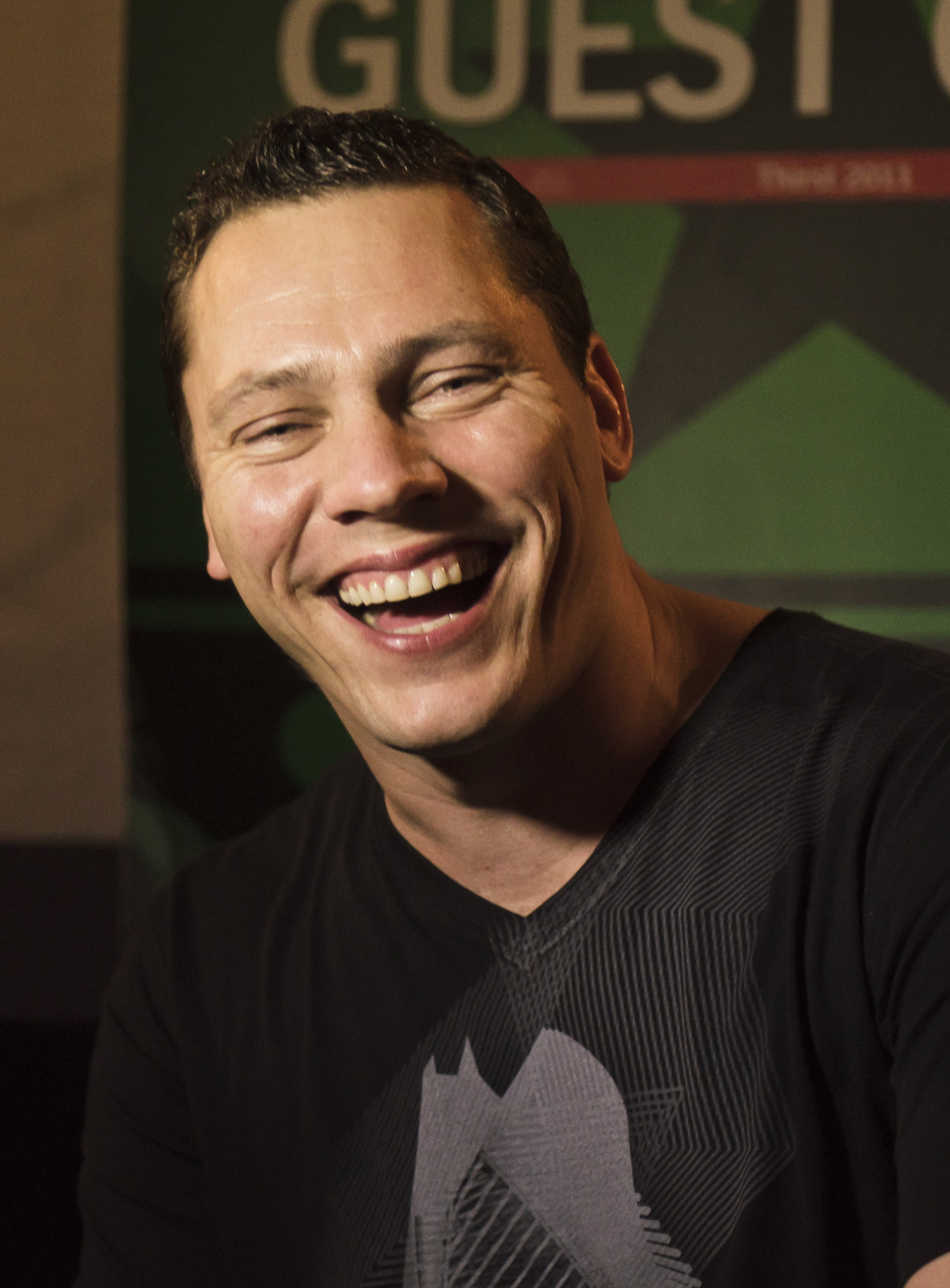
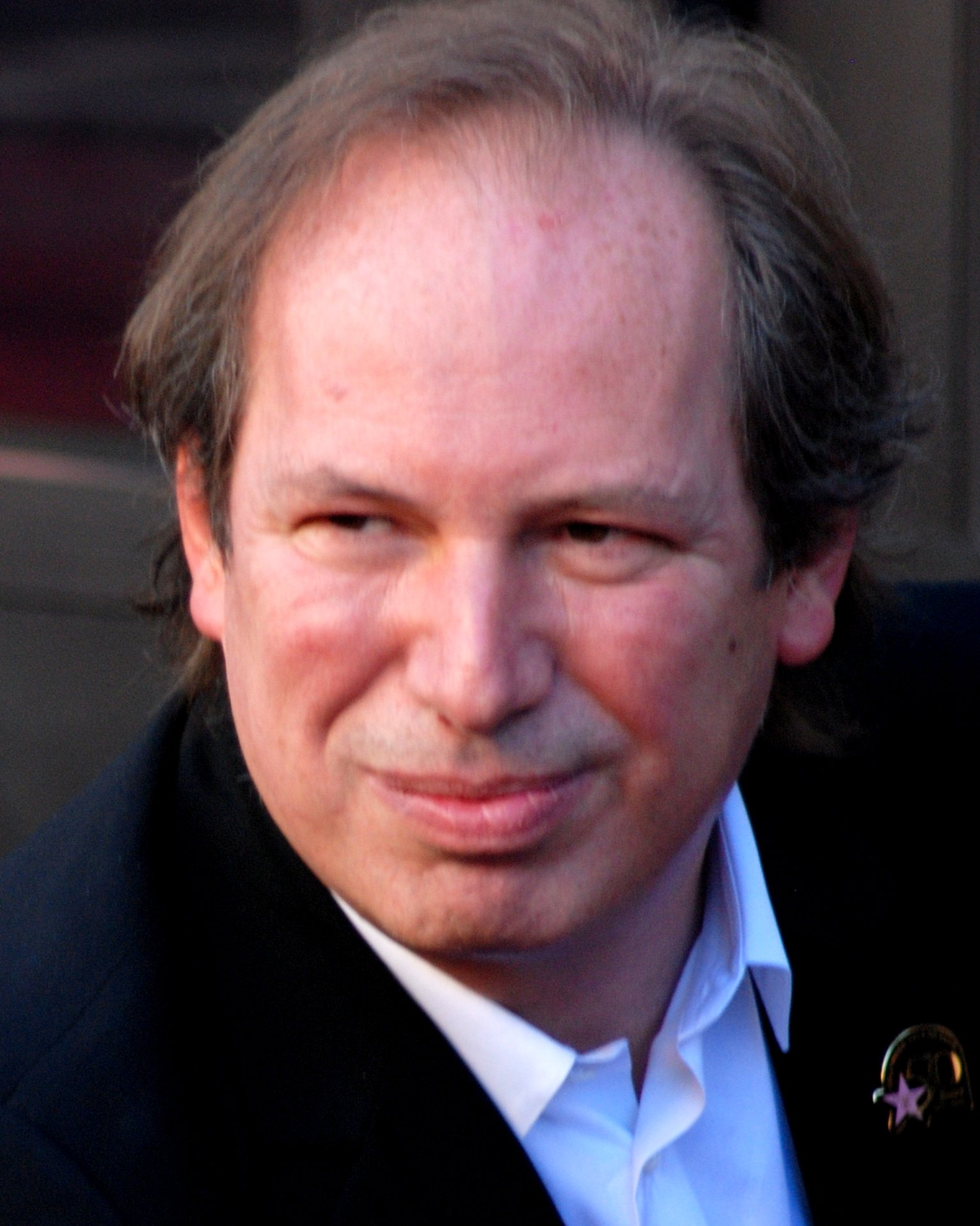
Walker drew inspiration from producers such as Tiësto and film composers such as Hans Zimmer.

Walker was inspired to start producing by Italian music producer DJ Ness. When making his debut single "Fade", Walker was influenced by the sound of the song "Nova" by Dutch music producer Ahrix. He has often spoken about the influence of Dutch music producer Tiësto. He is also inspired by music producers such as K-391, Kygo and Avicii, as well as film composers such as Hans Zimmer and Steve Jablonsky.

Walker is also influenced by video game music, drawing inspiration from The Legend of Zelda series, as well as classic games like Tetris. After playing a remix of a music track from the game Old School RuneScape, on Tomorrowland in 2025, he was invited to create two new tracks to be added to that game, in the game's music style. Other influences include the Call of Duty series and movie music.

=== Musical style ===
"Faded"
"Faded" is an electro house EDM song. The song features a melancholic and emotional melody and a tempo of 90 bpm, which makes the song often categorised as "downtempo". This style is characteristic of Walker's earlier music and is the sound that propelled him into the mainstream.

"On My Way"
"On My Way" is a departure from Walker's previous style, with a focus on future bass.

Walker's musical style has been described as house, future house, future bass, electropop, electro house, big room house, and progressive house. Walker's music was described by DJ Mag in March 2018 as "a mix of youthful styles like big room house, progressive, and electro", characterised by emotionally rich, grandiose melodies. It is also noted as being significantly darker and closer to minor keys compared to the upbeat rhythms of contemporary tropical house. He incorporates elements like video game music into his tracks. He has stated that the Nexus plugin in FL Studio defines the entirety of his sound.

Walker has stated that he focuses on melody and vocals over elements such as drums or bass. His production process begins with exchanging ideas to and reaching out to other vocalists or producers. Walker himself sometimes writes his lyrics, while other times the vocalist does. In other cases, melody and lyric ideas already exist before a vocalist is considered. When creating melodies, he draws inspiration from what he hears or from ideas that suddenly pop into his head, which he either records as voice memo or writes the melody down immediately. He sees artificial intelligence (AI) as an essential tool for music production.

== Public image and influence ==
Walker at Red Rocks Amphitheatre, with an outfit resembling a black bloc protester or a computer hacker.

Symbol consisting of intertwined letters "A" and "W" used by Walker as a logo

A former bedroom producer, Walker has been featured in multiple publications as a YouTube success story. He is also considered one of the most popular Norwegian artists on the world market. Naman Ramachandran of Variety described Walker as "one of electronic music's most celebrated producers." Audun Vinger of Dagens Næringsliv called Walker "one of the most successful artists in the Norwegian and Nordic music industry in recent years".

To protect his image, he uses a hoodie and face mask. In the first promo pictures his management handed out, Walker's face was barely visible, and in the music video for his single "Alone", he is dressed as a black shadow figure. This is, according to Walker, a carefully planned image drawn up together with his record company Sony. On stage, he is accompanied by two other men who are also masked. On occasion, Walker also sometimes wears a white mask and hoodie, explaining that, without headlights, artists in black could be difficult to see on stage. Furthermore, the current logo is composed of the initials "A" and "W" from Walker's real name, and was designed by Walker himself in 2013.

According to a YouGov poll, as of January 2025, roughly half of Americans have heard of Alan Walker. He is most well-known and popular among Millennials and Generation Z, with 60% having heard of him. He is known by 30% of Generation X and 19% of Baby Boomers.

As of November 2026, Walker has 150 million followers across his social media channels and has generated over 100 billion streams of his audio and video content. As of November 2026, his YouTube channel has over 47.9 million subscribers, making it the most subscribed YouTube channel in Norway. Walker's channel also surpassed 20 million subscribers in December 2018, making him the first Nordic artist to do so. His music videos have been viewed more than 17 billion times in total, with those for "Faded", "Alone" and "The Spectre", reaching over 1 billion views. As of March 2026, "Faded" has exceeded 3.9 billion views, making it the 33rd most viewed video on YouTube. Walker's Spotify profile has over 42.7 million followers, making him the 45th most followed artist and the most followed electronic dance music artist. Additionally, Walker's TikTok account has over 15 million followers, making him the most followed DJ on TikTok and the only DJ in the world with over 10 million followers. According to Billboard, as of May 2025, Walker's Instagram account has 10.4 million followers.

Walker's songs have been criticised for having too many composers credited. Walker received criticism for a walkthrough video on the YouTube channel Future Music Magazine about the making of his song "Alone". Because his co-producer Mood Melodies was heavily involved in the song's production, the video drew backlash from many of Walker's fans, who considered Mood Melodies to be his ghost producer. Norwegian newspaper Bergens Tidende also criticised Walker's song "On My Way" for having 12 composers and nine lyricists credited.

=== Julie Bergan dispute ===
Walker and Julie Bergan first collaborated on the song "Ignite", released in 2018. Bergan also sang on Walker's song "I Don't Wanna Go". For both this song and "Ignite", she served as a vocalist rather than a songwriter. In 2022, work progressed on the new song "Ritual", with Bergan participating as a lyricist and vocalist. During final negotiations for the release of "Ritual", a disagreement arose over the distribution percentage of the songwriting credits. Walker's management company, MER, offered Bergan a 5% share, but Bergan demanded 10%. Negotiations broke down, and a version without Bergan's vocals was released.

This decision prompted Bergan's management company, Circle, to prepare a lawsuit against MER seeking damages for breach of contract and unfair use. MER stated the damages could amount to millions of dollars; however, MER's attorneys completely denied Bergan's claims. Additionally, despite requests that she not appear, the music video for "Ritual" included footage of Bergan. Although the video was later removed from Walker's YouTube channel, no new footage was released, leaving only a version with audio and still images.

== Philanthropy ==
On 1 April 2017, Walker posted on Facebook that he would donate to the Norwegian Children's Cancer Society depending on the number of likes, shares, and comments he received, resulting in a total of 62,564 likes, 24,648 comments, and 6,840 shares, for a total of NOK 254,204 (about $23,000). In 2019, Walker donated $100,001 to Team Trees, a community fundraiser launched by American YouTubers MrBeast and Mark Rober to plant 20 million trees. On 4 December 2023, Walker donated 500,000 NOK (about $45,000) to Norwegian presenter and footballer Mads Hansen's fundraising campaign, which aims to bring a bright Christmas to families in need across Norway.

== Personal life ==
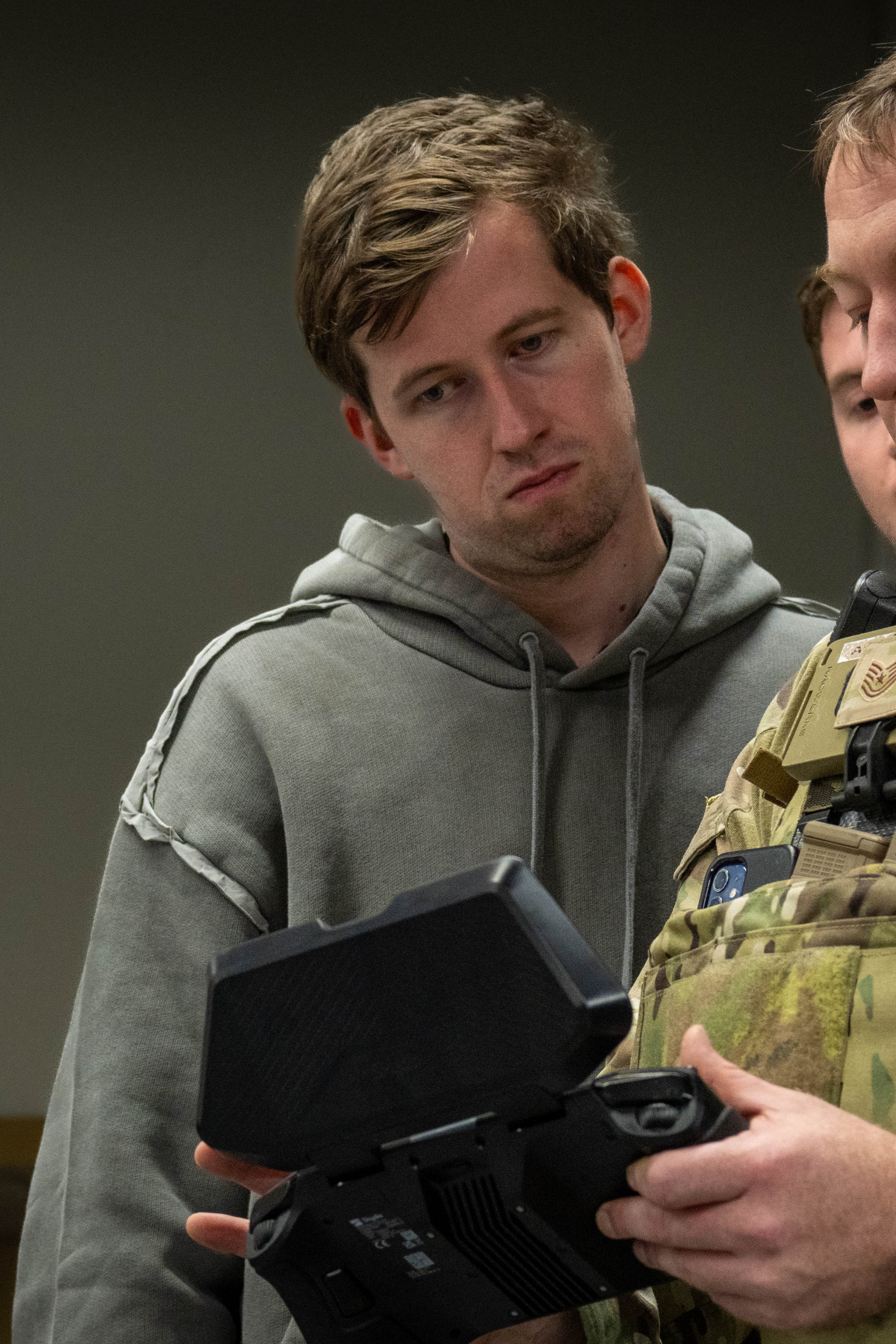
Walker, unmasked, 2024

In 2016, Walker adopted a dog named Happy. In September 2019, Walker purchased an apartment in Nordåsvatnet for $8.2 million. In February 2021, Walker adopted a cat named Peanut. In July 2021, Walker purchased a villa in Homansbyen, Oslo, Norway for NOK 35 million (about $3.4 million) to be used as both a residence, studio and office. In 2026, he got engaged to his Finnish girlfriend, Viivi Niemi.

Walker has purchased various cars, including an Audi R8 Spyder, a black Ferrari 488 Spider, a 2017 Lamborghini Aventador, and a Lamborghini Urus.

In February 2023, the BBC estimated Walker's net worth to be $20 million. In September 2023, Walker purchased the luxury villa "Skjöltn" in Bergen, Norway, for approximately NOK 40 million (about $3.5 million). On 4 September 2025, Walker posted on Instagram that his dog, Happy, had died.

== Discography ==
- Different World (2018)
- World of Walker (2021)
- Walkerverse Pt. I & II (2022)
- Walkerworld (2023)
- Walkerworld 2.0 (2025)
- World of Walker, Season One: Rise of the Drones (2026)

== Tours ==
Headlining

- Walker Tour (2016–2018)
- The World of Walker Tour (2018)
- Different World Tour (2018–2019)
- Aviation Tour (2019)
- Walkerverse: The Tour (2022–2023)
- Walkerworld Tour (2024–2025)

Supporting

- Rihanna – Anti World Tour (2016)
- Justin Bieber – Purpose World Tour (2017)
- Martin Garrix – Thursdays at Ushuaïa (2017)
- Kygo – Ushuaïa Beach Hotel for Summer (2017)
- Stargate – Olavsfestdagene (2017)
- Kygo – World Tour (México City) (2025)

== Accolades ==
Walker was nominated for a wide variety of accolades including Music of the Year from Gullsnutten, Best Norwegian Act at the MTV Europe Music Awards, the Public Choice Award and Best Norwegian Act at the European Border Breakers Award, Best New Talent at the WDM Radio Awards and Swiss Music Awards, the Export Award at the 2017 Spellemannprisen/Music Norway, Best Norwegian Act at the MTV Europe Music Awards, and Best Breakthrough Artist at the International Dance Music Awards, as well as being named Spellemann of the Year at the 2019 Spellemannprisen. His song "Faded" was awarded the Cannes Lions Award at the Cannes Lions International Festival of Creativity, Best International Hit at the Eska Music Awards, and the 2017 Spellemann Award for Song of the Year. At the NRJ Music Awards Norge, the song "Sing Me to Sleep" won Norwegian Song of the Year.
