= Walkerverse Pt. I & II =

- digital cover art

Studio album by Alan Walker
- Released: 25 November 2022
- Label: MER Musikk
- Producer: Alan Walker (exec.); Gunnar Greve (exec.); kasper; Joey Parki; Chris "Tek" O'Ryan; Mood Melodies; Carl Hovind; Mårten Fohlin; Magnus Gangstad Jørgensen; Johan Lindbrandt; Robin Stjernberg; James Njie; Johnny Goldstein; Sander Meland; Jim Bergsted; Philter

Alan Walker chronology
Walkerverse Pt. II (2022)	Walkerverse Pt. I & II (2022)	Walkerworld (2023)

Singles from Walkerverse Pt. I & II
- 1. "Hello World" Released: 4 March 2022; 2. "The Drum" Released: 29 April 2022; 3. "Extremes" Released: 30 September 2022; 4. "Lovesick" Released: 4 November 2022; 5. "Shut Up" Released: 18 November 2022; 6. "Ritual" Released: 25 November 2022

Walkerverse Pt. I & II is the third studio album by Norwegian record producer Alan Walker. The album contains nine tracks released on the preceding extended plays, Walkerverse Pt. I and Walkerverse Pt. II, released in June 2022 and November 2022 respectively. "Ritual" is the solo exclusive track to the album and released as a single. The album was released on 25 November 2022 through MER Musikk, and peaked at number 17 on the Norwegian VG-lista album chart.

The album was released physically in Japan in January 2023 under the title Walkerverse: Complete Edition.

== Track listing ==
Walkerverse Pt. I & II track listing
No.	Title	Writer(s)	Producer(s)	Length
1.	"Shut Up" (with Upsahl)	Alan Walker; Gunnar Greve Pettersen; Marcus Arnbekk; Fredrik Borch Olsen; Øyvind Sauvik; Mats Lie Skåre; Jamie Stenzel; Taylor Upsahl	Walker; kasper; Chris "Tek" O'Ryan^{[v]}	2:12
2.	"Ritual"	Walker; PettersenJoseph Parki; Arnbekk; Olsen; Sauvik; Skåre; Alexander Pavelich; Yasmin Moosavi; Eyelar Mirzazadeh; Edvard Førre Erfjord	Walker; kasper; Joey Parki^{[c]}; O'Ryan^{[v]}	2:25
3.	"The Drum"	Walker; Arnbekk; Olsen; Sauvik; Carl Hovind; Mårten Fohlin; Kristin Carpenter	Walker; kasper; Parki; Fohlin	3:09
4.	"Lovesick" (with Sophie Simmons)	Walker; Pettersen; Arnbekk; Olsen; Skåre; Robin Stjernberg; Johan Lindbrandt; Sophie Tweed-Simmons	Walker; kasper; Lindbrandt; Stjernberg	2:09
5.	"Catch Me if You Can" (with Sorana)	Walker; Pettersen; Anders Frøen; Arnbekk; Olsen; Sorana Pacurar; Roland Spreckley; Markus Sepehrmanesh	Walker; kasper; Mood Melodies; Carl Hovind^{[c]}; O'Ryan^{[v]}	2:31
6.	"Blue" (with Ina Wroldsen)	Walker; Kenneth Nilsen; Pettersen; Frøen; Arnbekk; Olsen; Skåre; Hovind; James Eriksen; Ina Wroldsen	Walker; kasper; Hovind; James Njie	2:37
7.	"Somebody Like U" (with Au/Ra)	Walker; Pettersen; Skåre; Arnbekk; Olsen; Sauvik; Jamie Stenzel	Walker; kasper	3:11
8.	"Extremes" (with Trevor Daniel)	Walker; Arnbekk; Olsen; Sauvik; Hovind; Carla Cappa; Janee Bennett; Yonatan Goldstein; Trevor Neill	Walker; Johnny Goldstein; kasper^{[c]}	2:29
9.	"Hello World" (with Torine)	Walker; Pettersen; Arnbekk; Olsen; Sauvik; Skåre; Frøen; Sander Meland; Rosanna Ener; Jim Bergsted; Torine Bjåland	Walker; Mood Melodies; Meland; kasper^{[c]}; Bergsted^{[v]}	2:51
10.	"Adventure Time" (with Philter)	Walker; Pettersen; Magnus Gangstad Jørgensen; Arnbekk; Olsen; Skåre	Walker; kasper; Philter	3:06

Notes

- ^{^[c]} signifies a co-producer.
- ^{^[v]} signifies a vocal producer.
- The moniker of "kasper" is listed as a collective production alias for producers Marcus Arnbekk, Big Fred, Vinni and Slipmats.

== Charts ==
Chart (2022)	Peak position
Finnish Albums (Suomen virallinen lista)	44
Norwegian Albums (VG-lista)	17
