= Sophia Somajo =

Swedish singer-songwriter (born 1985)

- Also known as: Soso
- Born: Sophia Somajo Venai; January 2, 1985 (age 41); Stockholm, Sweden
- Genres: Pop
- Occupations: Singer, songwriter
- Instrument: Vocals
- Years active: 2007–present
- Label: Do It Yourself Bitch Productions
- Website: www.sophiasomajo.com

Sophia Somajo Venai (born 2 January 1985), also known as Soso, is a Swedish songwriter and singer of Hungarian descent. She has released two albums and two extended plays, and worked with music producer Max Martin as a songwriter under her name and a number of pseudonyms.

== Biography ==
Somajo released The Laptop Diaries, her first album, in 2008. The album's musical style has led critics to compare her with singer Robyn.

In 2011, Somajo released the song "Wristcutters Inc.", featuring Pelle Almqvist from The Hives, then intended to be the lead single from her major-label debut album. After leaving a record deal with her record label in 2012, Somajo started her own label, named Do It Yourself Bitch Productions, and released T.T.I.D.S.D.I.E.U.I.C (That Time I Dug So Deep I Ended Up in China), her second album. The album was made available for free download via file sharing website The Pirate Bay. Somajo wrote, recorded and produced the album in her living room. Michael Cragg of The Guardian described it as "a brilliant, brutal and often baffling album that deserves wider attention for its raw and uncompromising dissection of a brain on overdrive." In 2013, Somajo released the song "Low" to celebrate Stockholm Pride.

Somajo released Freudian Slip, an extended play, in 2017. It was her first album where she has worked with outside producers, including Patrik Berger, Michel Flygare and Tobias Jimson.

In 2018, Somajo released her cover of Tina Turner's song "Private Dancer", the first new music from Freudian Slip II, her upcoming second EP. Later that year, Somajo was featured as the vocalist in Norwegian DJ Alan Walker's song "Diamond Heart". Kat Bein of Billboard compared her vocals in "Diamond Heart" to those of singer Sia's.

== Songwriting ==
Somajo has written songs under her name for Swedish artists Robyn and Style of Eye, and under a number of pseudonyms for Britney Spears, Christina Aguilera, Backstreet Boys, Alesso, Adam Lambert, and other artists. One of the pseudonyms she has used is Tiffany Amber. She described her use of pseudonyms as a way to manage expectations with her own music. In a 2018 interview with Popjustice, Somajo recalled being expected to work as a singer with teams of male songwriters and music producers. She noted producer Max Martin as an exception to that trend, who saw her as equivalent to male producers and gave her a chance to write and produce music. She described women musicians in pop music as shaped by songwriters writing from a male perspective, saying that "in popular culture when women relate to women, they’re actually relating to women as interpreted by men".
