= Hero (Alan Walker song) =

2023 song by Alan Walker and Sasha Alex Sloan

Single by Alan Walker and Sasha Alex Sloan

from the album Walkerworld
- Released: 4 May 2023
- Genre: Dance
- Label: MER Musikk
- Songwriters: Alan Walker; Slipmats; Big Fred; Marcus Arnebekk; Gunnar Greve; Kristin Carpenter; Rasmus Budny
- Producers: Alan Walker; Kasper

Alan Walker singles chronology
"Dreamer" (2023)	"Hero" (2023)	"Land of the Heroes" (2023)

Sasha Alex Sloan singles chronology
"Adult" (2022)	"Hero" (2023)	"Highlights" (2024)

Music video
- "Hero" on YouTube

"Hero" is a song recorded by British-Norwegian DJ Alan Walker and American singer-songwriter Sasha Alex Sloan, released by MER Musikk on 4 May 2023.

== Background ==
Of the song, Walker said, "I have been looking forward to releasing the song Hero for a long time. It was also a pleasure to work with Sasha Alex Sloan and her amazing voice. This song is about honoring the very important people we see as heroes. Honoring the work they have done to make this world brighter and tougher, Hero hopes to inspire listeners to embrace their inner heroes, live openly, and love deeply." Sasha says, "When Alan asked me to do the vocals on this song, I was so excited. I've been a fan of his since the faded days, so I'm excited to get our song out there."

== Critical reception ==
Soundrive's Darren Bezuidenhout said, "Walker shows off a new softer side of himself with Hero's cinematic melodies and swirling bass lines, and Sloan's excellent vocal performance." Madeleine Amos of RouteNote said, "Hero has a wistful feel with its melancholy strings, but also a hopeful beat. Meanwhile, talented singer Sasha Alex Sloan's gorgeous vocals are haunting and lift the entire song."

== Charts ==
=== Weekly charts ===
Weekly chart performance for "Hero"
Chart (2023–2025)	Peak position
Hungary (Dance Top 40)	8
Hungary (Rádiós Top 40)	1
Netherlands (Dutch Single Tip)	1
Norway (VG-lista)	27
Sweden Heatseeker (Sverigetopplistan)	5
US Hot Dance/Electronic Songs (Billboard)	18

=== Year-end charts ===
2023 year-end chart performance for "Hero"
Chart (2023)	Position
Hungary (Dance Top 40)	92
Hungary (Rádiós Top 40)	57
US Hot Dance/Electronic Songs (Billboard)	97

2024 year-end chart performance for "Hero"
Chart (2024)	Position
Hungary (Dance Top 40)	36

2025 year-end chart performance for "Hero"
Chart (2025)	Position
Hungary (Dance Top 40)	26
