= Bedroom production =

Music production done in a home studio

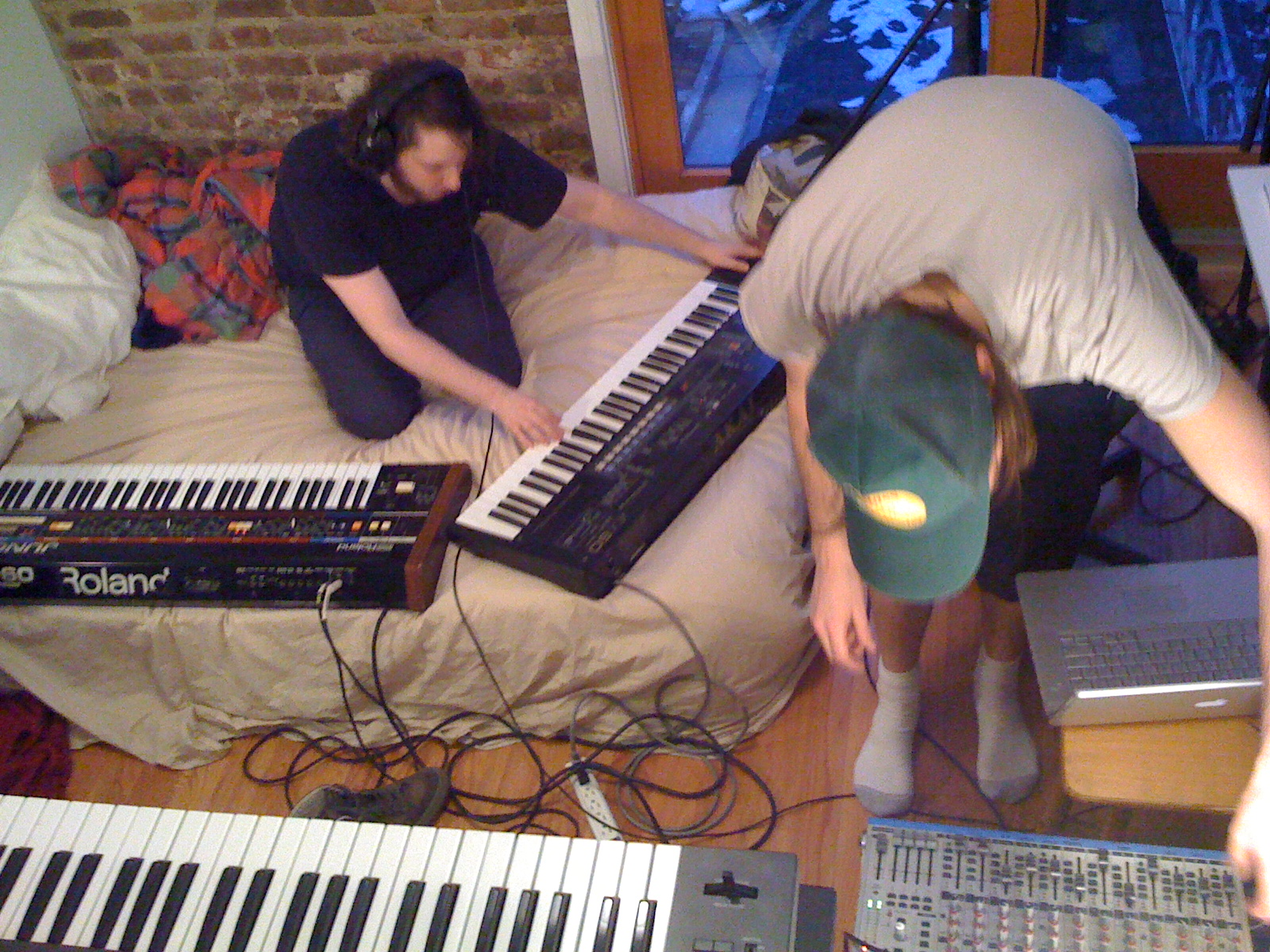
Oneohtrix Point Never producing music on a bed (2010)

A bedroom producer is an amateur musician who creates, performs, and records their music independently using a home studio, often considered a hobbyist opposed to a professional record producer in the recording industry that works in a traditional studio with clients. Typically bedroom producers use accessible digital technology that costs less than the equipment in a professional studio, such as MIDI controller-based instruments and virtual studio technology (software synthesized instruments and digital effects), to create music for release to the world. While a professional record producer oversees and guides the recording process, often working alongside multiple people such as studio musicians, singers, engineers, mixers, songwriters, arrangers, and orchestrators, a bedroom producer does everything independently: creating the ideas, recording them and processing them for release. Bedroom producers are often self-taught, learning sound design, mixing and music theory by reading music production blogs and watching tutorials on the internet. As bedroom producers depend on the accessibility of music technology, bedroom production has been made easier with advances in home computing power and digital audio workstations (DAW).

== Characteristics ==
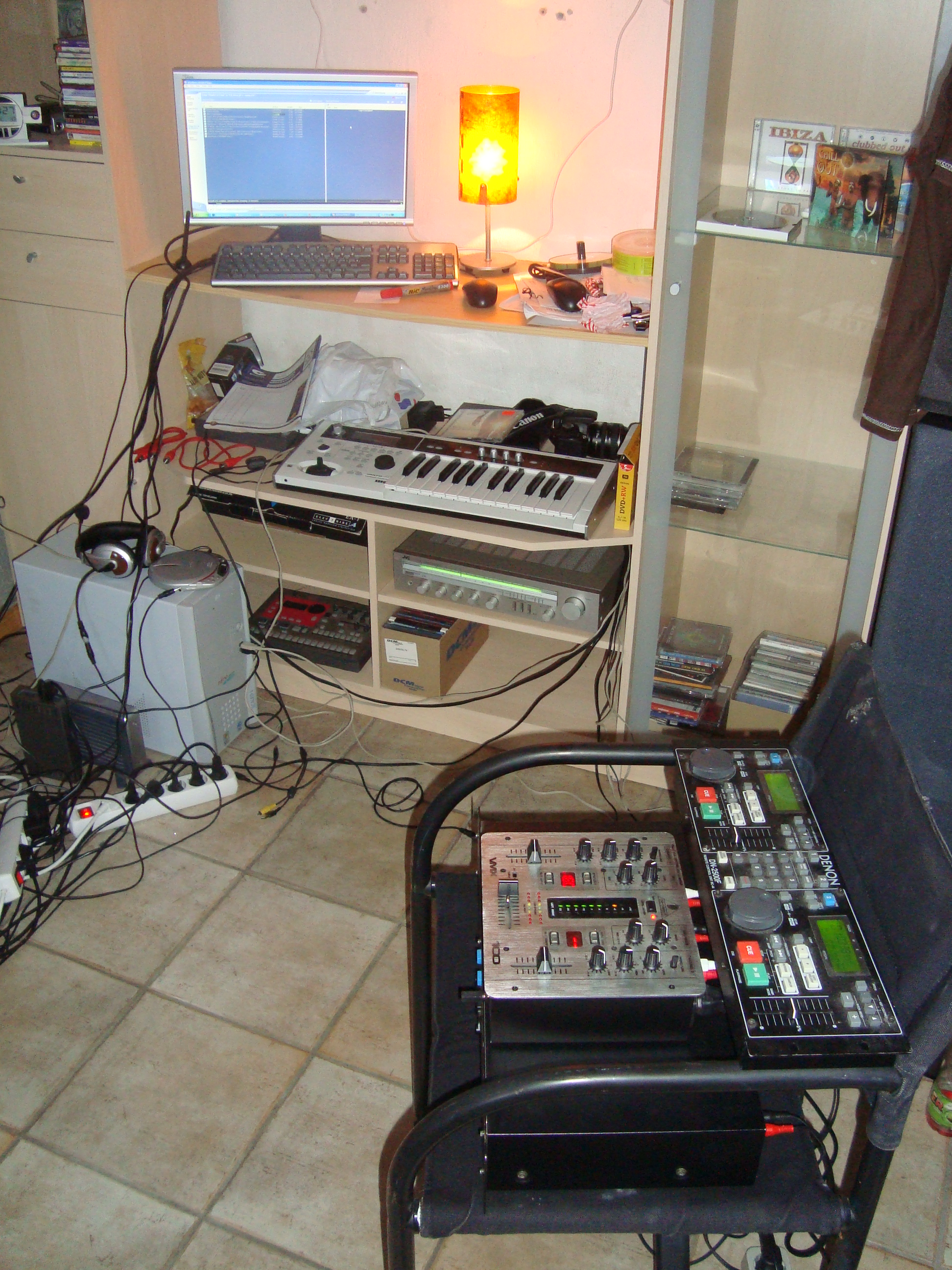
A small home studio with a Korg MicroX synthesizer, a Korg Electribe R (ER-1), Denon DN-2500F & Remote Control Unit RC-44, and a Behringer VMX-100

A majority of bedroom producers employ the MIDI sequencing capabilities of digital audio workstations, in conjunction with recorded sounds, to create musical compositions. These DAWs may be set up alongside high-quality recording equipment such as microphones and USB interfaces which enable bedroom producers to emulate full recording studio environments in a home studio. These home studios can be created for professional and hobbyist use. Despite economic advantages of the home studio, sometimes the more accessible technology may hinder the collaborative creative processes because this recording technology may not be as effective as in traditional recording studios.

While in the 1990s and the 2000s, music that was popular on the radio tended to be highly guitar-centric, over the last decade bedroom producers could create deceptively sophisticated musical productions (with digital string orchestra, for example) which have become prominent on the radio, impacting mainstream culture. While rock musicians would have to perform live to make a name for themselves, bedroom producers often prefer the more intimate solitude of their own homes and using the internet allows them to not only release their music but also have maximum control over their own image as independent artists. This has also led to a rise in independent producing entrepreneurs for the first time since the 1950s/1960s.

The high accessibility of music production software and equipment has led to a "rapid democratisation of the tools in terms of creating music." Today, many young musicians are leaning towards getting into music through software instead of through instruments because of the low startup cost, especially with the piracy of software onto personal laptops. This has created the trend of engineering producers, or at least producers who have basic audio engineering knowledge. Because bedroom produced music is made independently, or in small collaborations, it is often strongly connoted with being DIY. Bedroom produced music is also often referred to as being made "in the box" (when the music production is, either wholly or partially, completed with software processing of samples, VSTs and synths within a DAW). Bedroom produced music relies largely on sharing music through social media. Recorded music, especially bedroom produced and independent music, is regarded as an internet industry.

== History ==
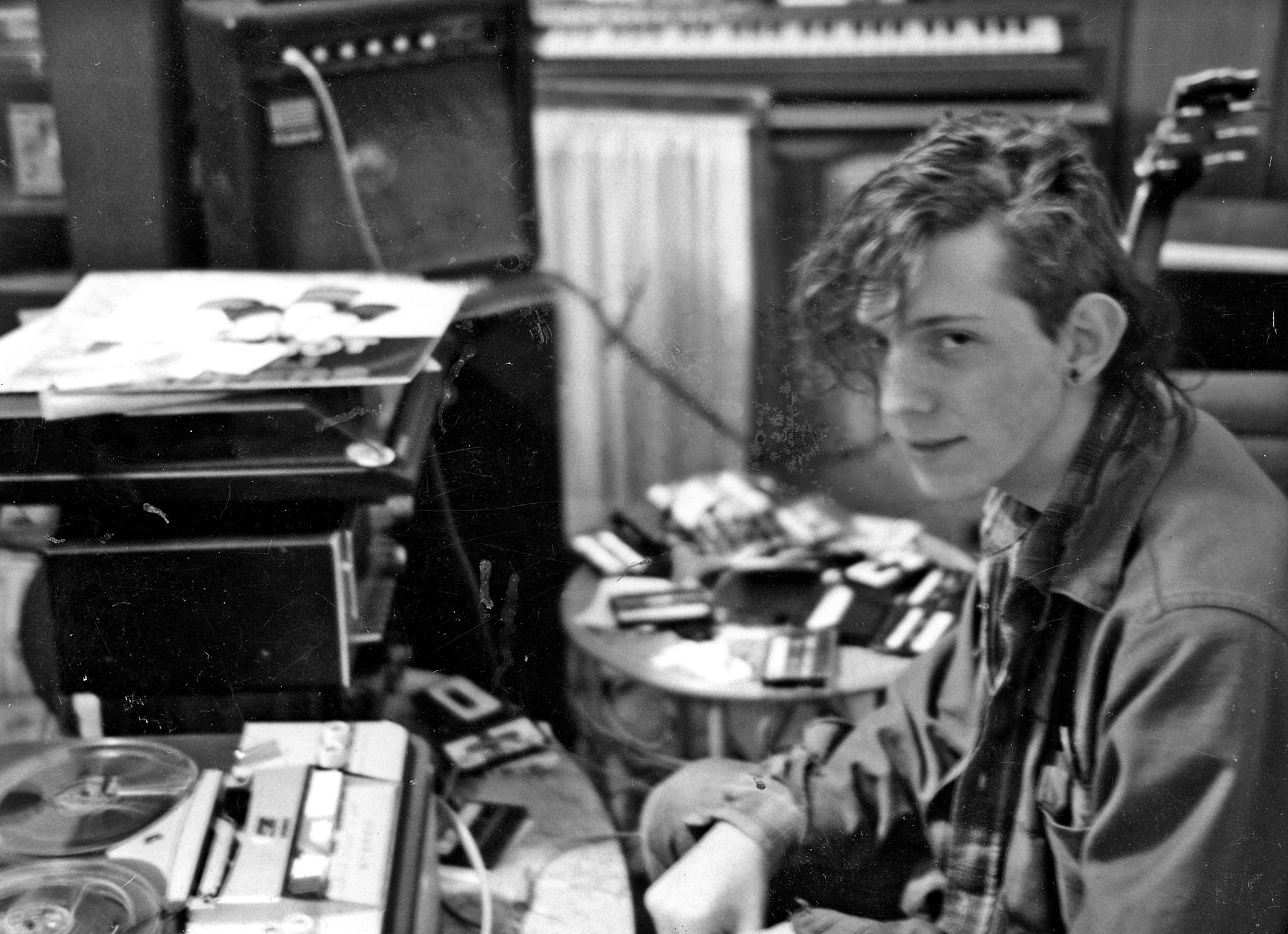
A 1980s home studio with a reel-to-reel tape recorder

Although there was some early bedroom production before the 1990s using hardware instruments and recording to tape, the rise of bedroom production is more often closely related to an increase in computing power and decrease in the cost of music technologies which allowed for DAWs to become more accessible towards the end of the 20th century. In the early 1990s, Steinberg released its DAW; Cubase Audio and in 1996 Steinberg invented the VST and remodeled the Cubase interface to emulate a full hardware recording environment. DAWs today are inexpensive, and most bedroom producers use them to create their music. Even before the invention of DAWs people recorded in home studios on tape. A home studio is simply a music setup in a person's home that has most of the recording capabilities of a traditional recording studio. The invention of MIDI "allowed the first home studios to be born." Despite the term "bedroom producers", they may have their studio in other rooms, such as a basement. Indeed, it may not be necessary to have a home studio at all since a computer device with a DAW is only needed.

Before the invention of DAWs, MIDI could only be utilised through external hardware setups which were very expensive. Since the monetary cost of recording software and technology has decreased and laptops with DAW software have become more available, there has been a huge increase in the number of producers creating music using DAWs as an all in one solution. Because of this massive increase in the number of music producers, some people believe the overall quality of electronic music has increased. In contrast, others say that with the saturation of electronic producers releasing in the music market, it has become significantly difficult for producers to become recognised.

== Software ==
This section will describe the everyday use of DAWs and VST software for creating bedroom-produced music. First, MIDI will be explained to clarify its use in DAW.

MIDI stands for Musical Instrument Digital Interface and is the most common way of connecting musical equipment to various devices and to a central DAW. Because MIDI information is non-acoustic, in the form of data instead of sound waves, it can be used to send musical information from one VST device to another or through external hardware which can be connected to a DAW, such as a MIDI keyboard or other MIDI controller. For example, if a melody is performed on a MIDI keyboard, this melody could be plugged into a synth module so that it might sound like any instrument, from a flute or electric guitar, or even a sampled full orchestra. When MIDI information is sent to different VST devices, new sounds are created from the same musical data. For example, a melody played by a virtual MIDI (VST) piano could be moved into a guitar track in a DAW to have exactly the same passage played by a virtual guitar. Because MIDI is a form of data, it is typically viewed in the form of a piano roll, not as waveforms. MIDI was created in the early 80s by multiple large instrument manufacturers working together to standardise the communication between the devices of different instrument manufacturers.

A DAW (Digital Audio Workstation) is an electronic device or more commonly a musical software used for recording, mixing, editing and processing digital audio. While the structure of a DAW can vary from being a single software to a series of connected hardware, all DAWs have a central interface for processing audio into a final composition on a laptop or desktop computer.

Virtual Studio Technologies or VSTs are devices used to replicate analog effects, instruments and effects that used to be commonly found in studios, for audio processing and synthesis within DAW software. VST instruments and VST effects are most commonly used; however, other types of VSTs also exist, such as various spectrum analysers. Some VSTs also emulate traditional synthesisers and samplers. VST instruments synthesise sound by taking a MIDI input and then sending it to an output or through VST effects via effects chaining.

VSTs are classified into:

- Effects, which manipulate the audio signal of a track or group of tracks. Examples include EQ, compression, and delay.
- Instruments, which generate their own audio signal like a musical instrument. These can be highly manipulated to create synthesised sounds, or they may be samples that imitate the sound of real acoustic instruments.
- MIDI, which manipulates the MIDI information, such as arpeggiation of the notes in a sustained chord.

Bedroom producers may use VSTs such as Massive, Serum, Spire, or Nexus. Flume has said that electronic production techniques have provided expanded creative possibilities.

Bedroom producers may "pirate" their music software using torrenting or "cracking", which leads to an even higher level of access to DAWs and VSTs for bedroom producers. In some cases, the pirating of music software in this way has led to increased sales for these larger companies. However, pirating software can cause problems for less established VST companies.

== Equipment ==
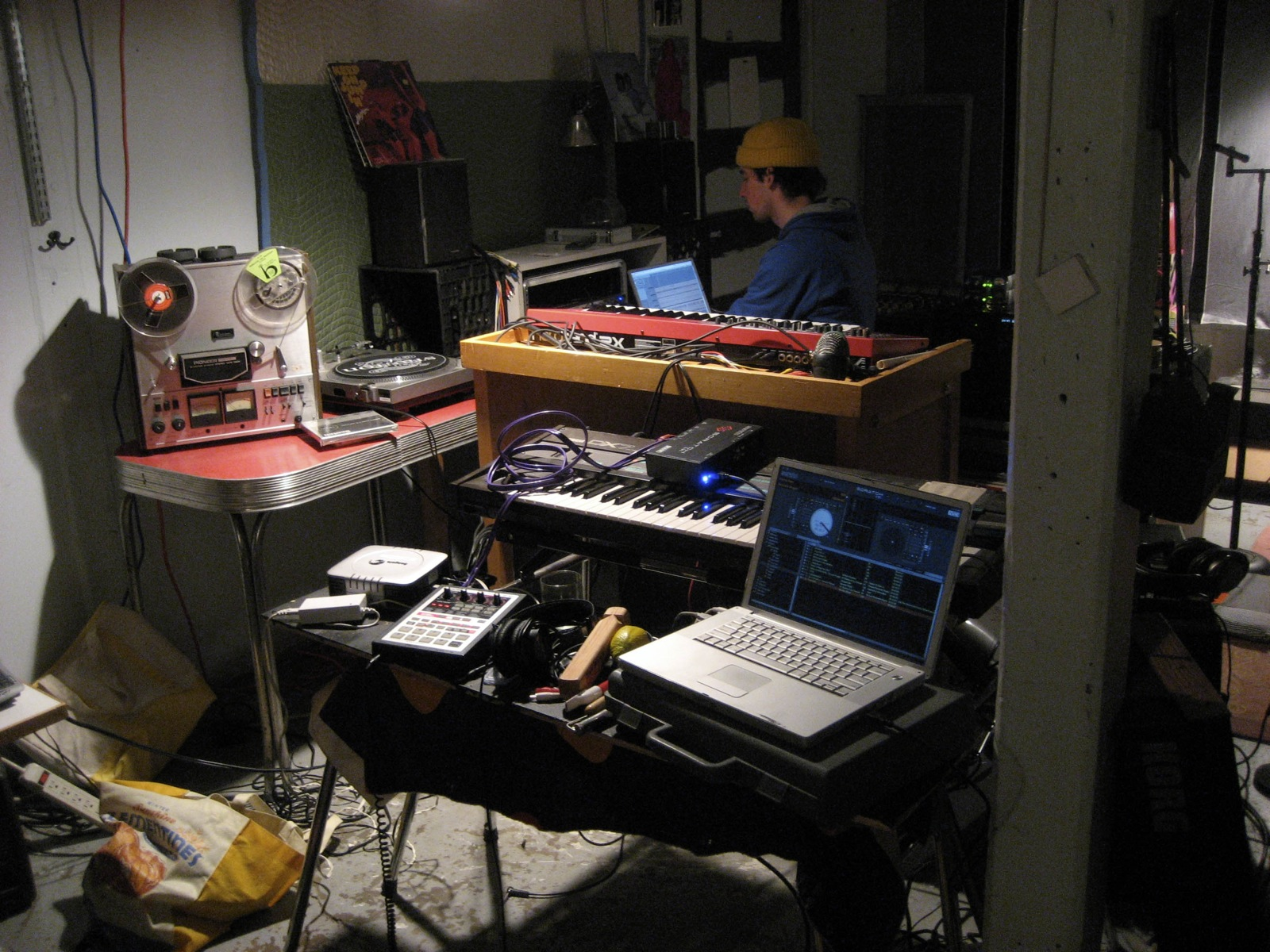
MIDI keyboards, a laptop, a record player, a reel-to-reel tape machine, and electronic devices can be seen in this home studio.

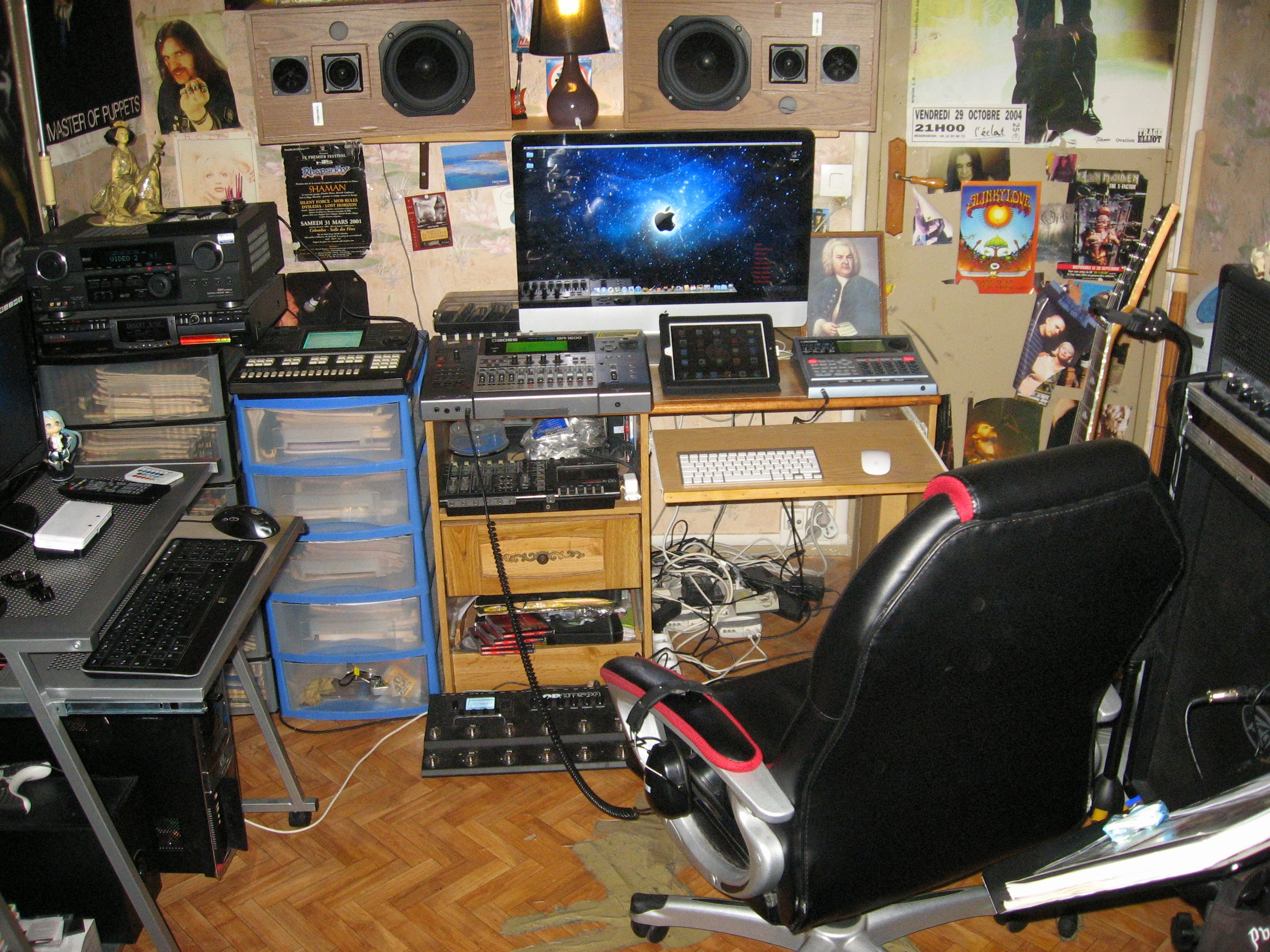
Guitar amp, an iMac, a desktop, a digital recorder, an analogic recorder, a sequencer, an iPad and electronic devices can be seen in this home studio.

While setups between individuals may vary, the basic setup of a bedroom home studio includes: a computer running a DAW, a microphone with a pop filter running through an audio interface, headphones and/or monitors and a MIDI controller such as a MIDI keyboard or drum machine. The microphone will record the vocals, sounds and acoustic instruments that may be used by sending the audio into the DAW through the audio interface. The sound of the music in the DAW is played back through the audio interface in playback. The pop filter is used to reduce the loud signal of word plosions such as when pronouncing words starting with 'p' or 'b' sounds. Headphones and monitors are used to listen to the playback and for mixing. A MIDI controller works as the instrument for producers, to use instead of programming individual notes into sequences in the DAW. While it is common to record in a bedroom studio, Sampling is also widely used in bedroom production. Bedroom producers typically use drum samples as a cheaper alternative to recording drums. However, a vast range of samples are used in bedroom productions, such as chord loops, vocal samples, kit dimples and sometimes even entire sections of songs (although this often infringes copyright).

== Market saturation ==
Deadmau5 claims that the apparent market saturation is because the sounds of popular electronic dance music are easily reproducible so many artists who are seeking mainstream success are making very stylistically similar sounding music. This is especially true for EDM mixing techniques and the trend of mixing for loud volumes instead of mixing for dynamics. From an economic perspective, Forbes believes the EDM industry (now $7.4billion US) still has growth potential and that this growth is not only coming from live performances such as from festivals but also from streaming and downloading, which contributes mainly to the total revenues of EDM. For the broader electronic music genre, many believe that its mostly instrumental nature makes it highly transferable to markets which speak different languages. So, even if saturation is reached in some countries, market growth of the genre will likely continue in others.
