= Dreamer (instrumental) =

2023 single by Alan Walker

Single by Alan Walker
- Released: 7 April 2023
- Genre: House
- Length: 3:45
- Label: NCS
- Songwriters: Alan Walker; Kasper; James Njie; Big Fred; Gunnar Greve; Marcus Ambekk; Slipmats
- Producers: Alan Walker; Kasper

Alan Walker singles chronology
"Ritual" (2022)	"Dreamer" (2023)	"Hero" (2023)

Music video
- "Dreamer" (Alan Walker) on YouTube

Audio video
- "Dreamer" (NCS) on YouTube

"Dreamer" is an instrumental composition recorded by Norwegian DJ and record producer Alan Walker, released by NoCopyrightSounds on 7 April 2023. The song reached number 47 on Billboard Hot Dance/Electronic Songs chart and won the award for Best Instrumental Non-Vocal Release at the 2024 Electronic Dance Music Awards.

== Background ==
Dreamer was Walker's first release on NCS in eight years and also his first since his original contract expired and his previous releases were dropped. According to the press release, the impetus for "Dreamer" came from a Twitter poll in which Walker asked fans, "Can you believe it's been 10 years since I started posting my music on YouTube. Should we take it to the beginning?" After more than 90% responded in the affirmative, Walker began work on "Dreamer." On 4 April 2023, Walker and NCS came to an agreement regarding his re-signing to the former label, with Walker simply posting handshake emoji on Twitter. On 8 April, he posted on Twitter announcing that the official music video for "Dreamer" would be released in 100 hours. Walker said of the song, "Walkers, I’ve completed the challenge and have ended up with my new single ‘Dreamer’ on NCS. A tribute to all of you who supported me since the early days of my career. We’re celebrating you, my community and most dedicated fans. I hope you're equally stoked as I am and I can't wait to see all your creations on the song!"

== Critical reception ==
Dancing Astronaut said, "Like his past masterpieces, 'Dreamer' is beautifully layered with harmonies reminiscent of a choral ensemble, giving the song an otherworldly, transcendent quality. The production, like Walker's past work, is meticulously crafted." EDM Identity's Sheila Lim said, "While the core of the song takes the listener back to the 'Faded' era, 'Dreamer' represents a story of transformation and creative growth that highlights Alan Walker's disruptive storytelling abilities and originality as a producer. He has not forgotten about 'Walkers' and has given fans a compilation of their dedication stitched together in the official music video." EDM.com said, "The layered, textured sound design expertly weaves organic and electronic elements together to create a gritty, ethereal track." Nicole Pepe of We Rave You said, "With digitized elements making you feel like you should be zooming through outer space on an epic quest to save humanity." Jonathan Currinn of CelebMix said, "Taking inspiration from previous hits and using them as the basis for “Dreamer,” he ensures listeners a subtle sense of nostalgia while also laying down an unstoppable current melody that wraps it all up into a deeply moving track."

== Music video ==
The music video zooms by with a group of lucky Walkers performing the song for the first time. The music video released on Walker's channel has 2 million views, and the video released on the NCS channel has 2.5 million views. The first release on the NCS YouTube channel attracted over 2,600 viewers, with over 3,400 likes in the 10 hours leading up to the first release and 618 comments, and reached 1 million views within 13 days of its release.

== Track listing ==
Digital download - single
No.	Title	Length
1.	"Dreamer"	2:35

Digital download - Egzod Remix
No.	Title	Length
1.	"Dreamer" (Egzod Remix)	3:04

Digital download - Alex Skrindo Remix
No.	Title	Length
1.	"Dreamer" (Alex Skrindo Remix)	2:09

Digital download - Rival Remix
No.	Title	Length
1.	"Dreamer" (Rival Remix)	2:18

Digital download - Beauz & Heleen Remix
No.	Title	Length
1.	"Dreamer" (Beauz & Heleen Remix)	2:05

== Charts ==
Chart (2023)	Peak position
US Hot Dance/Electronic Songs (Billboard)	47
