= Magnus Gangstad Jørgensen =

Norwegian electronic music artist

Magnus Gangstad Jørgensen (born 29 September 1985), better known as Philter is a Norwegian electronic music artist. He was born and partially raised in Molde and moved to Bergen at the age of ten.

With the music project Philter, he is the artist on NRKs "urørt-page" (Untouched page) which has most downloads and listenings (over 800,000).

He is signed to Nordic Records.

== Discography ==
- The Lights (single, 2011)
- Revolver (single, 2011)
- The Beautiful Lies (2011)
- The Blossom Chronicles (2012)
- Run Baby Run (single, 2013)
- The Legend Of Iya (Original Gamescore) (2014)
- She Walks Alone (single, 2015)
- We Move Like Wolves (single, 2015)
- The Campfire Tales (2016)
- The Queen of Crows (2019)
- The Lionheart Legacy (2024)
- The Origin Tapes (2025)
