= Ignite (K-391 song) =

Single by K-391 featuring Alan Walker, Julie Bergan and Seungri
- Released: 11 May 2018
- Studio: MER
- Genre: Electronic
- Length: 3:30
- Label: MER (Sony); Liquid State Limited
- Composers: Kenneth Nilsen; Alan Walker
- Lyricists: Kenneth Nilsen; Alan Walker; Gunnar Greve
- Producers: K-391; Alan Walker; Big fred (Fredrik Borch Olsen)

K-391 singles chronology
"Ignite" (2018)	"Mystery" (2018)

Alan Walker singles chronology
"All Falls Down" (2017)	"Ignite" (2018)	"Darkside" (2018)

Seungri singles chronology
"Combo" (2018)	"Ignite" (2018)	"1, 2, 3!" / "Where R U From" (2018)

Audio sample
- "Ignite": file; help

Music video
- "Ignite" on YouTube

"Ignite" is a single by Norwegian music producer K-391 featuring Norwegian DJ Alan Walker, Norwegian singer Julie Bergan, and South Korean singer Seungri. It was released on 11 May 2018.

== Background and composition ==
"Ignite" is a reimagining of K391's 2015 hit "Godzilla" featuring Marvin Divine. In 2017, the track was reworked in collaboration with Alan Walker, for a promotion of the launch of the Sony Xperia XZs smartphone. An article mentioned: ""Ignite", is quite an explosive, and heartwarming concoction. With a full injection of pitched-up, memorable synth progressions and passionate verses by Julie Bergan."

== Music video ==
The music video of Ignite, released on K-391's channel on 11 May 2018 (the same day as the single's release), depicts three young people stuck in various troubles – the first one continually picked on by bullies; another despised their work with waste management; and a third was harassed by a boss about not working hard or fast enough. However, they each found a set of headphones that took them to a destination that relieved them of their struggles and helped them find their true happiness at last.

On 5 November 2023, a breakdown video of Ignite was published on that same channel, detailing the music production of the track.

== Charts ==
=== Weekly charts ===
Weekly chart performance for "Ignite"
Chart (2018–2019)	Peak position
Belgium (Ultratip Bubbling Under Wallonia)	4
Finland (Suomen virallinen lista)	5
Norway (VG-lista)	1
Poland Airplay (ZPAV)	5
Sweden (Sverigetopplistan)	13
US Hot Dance/Electronic Songs (Billboard)	28

=== Year-end charts ===
2018 year-end chart performance for "Ignite"
Chart (2018)	Position
Sweden (Sverigetopplistan)	62

== Certifications ==
Certifications for "Ignite"
Region	Certification	Certified units/sales
Norway (IFPI Norway)	4× Platinum	240,000^{‡}
Poland (ZPAV)	2× Platinum	40,000^{‡}
^{‡} Sales+streaming figures based on certification alone.
