= Darkside (Alan Walker song) =

Single by Alan Walker, Au/Ra and Tomine Harket

from the album Different World
- Released: 27 July 2018
- Recorded: 27 June 2018
- Genre: Electro house; glitch hop
- Length: 3:31
- Label: Mer Musikk; Ultra
- Songwriters: Walker; Frøen; Borgen; Rosness; Arnbekk; Olsen; G. Pettersen; La Verdi; Atle Pettersen; Jamie Stenzel; William Wiik Larsen; Andrew Frampton
- Producers: Walker; Mood Melodies; Olsen; Mere Music

Alan Walker singles chronology
"Ignite" (2018)	"Darkside" (2018)	"Diamond Heart" (2018)

Audio sample
- "Darkside": file; help

Music video
- "Darkside" on YouTube

"Darkside" is a song by Norwegian DJ and record producer Alan Walker, featuring Antiguan-German singer Au/Ra and Norwegian singer Tomine Harket. The song was recorded on 27 June 2018 and released on 27 July via Mer Musikk and Ultra Music as the second single from Walker's debut album, Different World (2018). Two remixes were released, one by Austrian DJ and producer Lumix and one by Afrojack in collaboration with Chasner.

== Background ==
The single is the second installment in the World of Walker trilogy, with the futuristic, post-apocalyptic sci-fi world seen in his previous video "All Falls Down" revisited here with hopeful views for the future with majestic landscapes. The video before "All Falls Down", "Tired" served as a prequel to this trilogy where a solar storm destroyed all technology on Earth, changing the course of humanity forever.

== Music video ==
These videos were directed by MER creative director Kristian Berg. Together with the accompanying music video, "Darkside" is the second song in the World of Walker trilogy, following the previous single "All Falls Down".

The video features several World War II monuments and memorials in Yugoslavia, namely Monument to the Revolution of the People of Moslavina in Podgarić and Valley of Heroes in Tjentište, as well as the Mausoleum of Njegoš on the top of Mount Lovćen and the Kravica waterfall in Ljubuški.

== Charts ==
=== Weekly charts ===
Weekly chart performance
Chart (2018–19)	Peak position
Australia (ARIA)	148
Austria (Ö3 Austria Top 40)	63
Belgium (Ultratip Bubbling Under Flanders)	8
Belgium (Ultratip Bubbling Under Wallonia)	13
Canada Hot 100 (Billboard)	93
Czech Republic Airplay (ČNS IFPI)	11
Finland (Suomen virallinen lista)	6
Finland Airplay (Radiosoittolista)	27
Germany (GfK)	97
Hungary (Rádiós Top 40)	37
Hungary (Single Top 40)	17
Netherlands (Dutch Top 40)	8
Netherlands (Single Top 100)	32
Norway (VG-lista)	1
Norway Airplay (IFPI Norge)	1
Poland Airplay (ZPAV)	8
Sweden (Sverigetopplistan)	10
Switzerland (Schweizer Hitparade)	39
US Hot Dance/Electronic Songs (Billboard)	9

=== Year-end charts ===
Annual chart rankings
Chart (2018)	Position
Netherlands (Dutch Top 40)	48
US Hot Dance/Electronic Songs (Billboard)	48

Chart (2019)	Position
US Hot Dance/Electronic Songs (Billboard)	32

== Certifications ==
Certifications and sales
Region	Certification	Certified units/sales
Austria (IFPI Austria)	Gold	15,000^{‡}
Canada (Music Canada)	Platinum	80,000^{‡}
Denmark (IFPI Danmark)	Gold	45,000^{‡}
France (SNEP)	Gold	100,000^{‡}
Mexico (AMPROFON)	2× Platinum	120,000^{‡}
New Zealand (RMNZ)	Gold	15,000^{‡}
Norway (IFPI Norway)	4× Platinum	240,000^{‡}
Poland (ZPAV)	2× Platinum	40,000^{‡}
Portugal (AFP)	Gold	5,000^{‡}
Spain (Promusicae)	Gold	30,000^{‡}
Switzerland (IFPI Switzerland)	Gold	10,000^{‡}
United Kingdom (BPI)	Silver	200,000^{‡}
United States (RIAA)	Gold	500,000^{‡}
Streaming
Sweden (GLF)	2× Platinum	16,000,000^{†}
^{‡} Sales+streaming figures based on certification alone.^{†} Streaming-only figures based on certification alone.
