= Walkerworld =

Studio album by Alan Walker
- Released: 10 November 2023
- Genre: Dance
- Length: 27:41
- Label: Kreatell
- Producer: Alan Walker (exec.); Gunnar Greve (exec.); kasper; Steve Aoki; Vikkstar; Dash Berlin

Alan Walker chronology
Walkerverse Pt. I & II (2022)	Walkerworld (2023)	Neon Nights (2024)

Singles from Walkerworld
- 1. "Hero" Released: 4 May 2023; 2. "Land of the Heroes" Released: 6 July 2023; 3. "Endless Summer" Released: 13 July 2023; 4. "Better Off (Alone, Pt. III)" Released: 28 September 2023; 5. "Heart Over Mind" Released: 10 November 2023

Walkerworld is the fourth studio album by Norwegian DJ and record producer Alan Walker. It was released on 10 November 2023 through Kreatell (formerly MER Musikk). The album peaked at number 18 on the Norwegian VG-lista album chart.

Upon released, Walker said the album won't end with this current set of tracks, as new tracks will be released in this album monthly until late 2024, starting with "Fire", a collaboration with Jvke and Song Yuqi (from (G)I-dle) released in December 2023.

Walker spoke about the album that: "...heralds the introduction of an innovative and immersive chapter in the World of Walker. Not too long ago, I sat in my childhood bedroom and dreamt of creating music that could touch people's hearts and leave a lasting impact. I am incredibly grateful to continue this journey and step into this new phase with the support of an exceptional group of talented artists, creatives, and community. This release is a milestone for every individual who has joined me on this incredible ride over the past eight years. My hope is that the album brings a sense of happiness to all who listen to it".

== Walkerworld: The Game ==
Walkerworld: The Game is a Fortnite map created with Unreal Editor. It is a playable theme park experience launched in 15 December 2023. Every month, the world will be expanded with new songs, gameplays, and other features. The first chapter is a PvP map, where the main goal is to capture objectives to get points and eliminate enemy players. It is accompanied by a 24-hour giveaway with a $5,000 prize, where the goal is to find song titles throughout the map.

== Track listing ==
Walkerworld track listing
No.	Title	Writer(s)	Producer(s)	Length
1.	"Welcome to Walkerworld"	Alan Walker; Gunnar Greve Pettersen; James "Njie" Eriksen; Marcus Arnbekk; Fredrik Borch Olsen; Mats Lie Skåre; Amanda Delara Nikman; Muna Al Tamini; Faisal Saud	Walker	2:47
2.	"Heart Over Mind" (with Daya)	Walker; Pettersen; Carl Hovind; Arnbekk; Olsen; Skåre; Kristin Carpenter	Walker; kasper	3:09
3.	"Hero" (with Sasha Alex Sloan)	Walker; Pettersen; Arnbekk; Olsen; Skåre; Carpenter; Rasmus Budny	Walker; kasper	2:55
4.	"Spectre 2.0" (with Steve Aoki and Lonely Club)	Walker; Pettersen; Steven Aoki; Jesper Borgen; Anders Frøen; Lars Rosnes; Arnbekk; Olsen; Skåre; Edvard Normann; Kristoffer Haugan; Thomas La Verdi	Walker; kasper; STATE; Steve Aoki	2:57
5.	"Better Off (Alone, Pt. III)" (with Dash Berlin and Vikkstar)	Walker; Pettersen; Vikram Singh Barn; Arnbekk; Olsen; Skåre; Ida Martinsen Botten; Eelke Kalberg; Sebastiaan Molijn	Walker; kasper; Vikkstar; Dash Berlin	2:32
6.	"Endless Summer" (with Zak Abel)	Walker; Pettersen; Arnbekk; Olsen; Skåre; Zachary Zilesnik; Oliver "OJM" Marland; Ruth-Anne Cunningham; Oliver Green	Walker; kasper	3:07
7.	"Born to Ride" (with Sophie Stray)	Walker; Pettersen; Arnbekk; Olsen; Skåre; Moa Pettersson Hammar; Lara Andersson; Gustav Landall; Simon Jonasson	Walker; kasper	2:44
8.	"Yesterday" (with Ali Gatie)	Walker; Pettersen; Arnbekk; Olsen; Skåre; Sarah Blanchard; Pablo Bowman; Richard Boardman; Aaron Hibell; Ali Ghati	Walker; kasper	2:41
9.	"Land of the Heroes" (with Sophie Stray)	Walker; Pettersen; Eriksen; Arnbekk; Olsen; Skåre; Nikman	Walker; kasper	2:56
10.	"Darkride"	Walker; Eriksen	Walker; James Njie	1:53
Total length:				27:41

Notes

- The moniker of "kasper" is listed as a collective production alias for producers Marcus Arnbekk, Big Fred and Slipmats.

== Charts ==
Chart performance for Walkerworld
Chart (2023)	Peak position
Finnish Albums (Suomen virallinen lista)	33
Norwegian Albums (VG-lista)	18
