= Diamond Heart (Alan Walker song) =

2018 single by Alan Walker featuring Sophia Somajo

Single by Alan Walker and Sophia Somajo

from the album Different World
- Released: 28 September 2018
- Recorded: 2017–2018
- Genre: Electro house
- Length: 3:59
- Label: MER Recordings
- Songwriters: Alan Walker; Anders Froen; Edvard Normann; Fredrik Borch Olsen; Gunnar Greve; James Njie; Kristoffer Haugan; Sophia Somajo; Atle Pettersen; Thomas Troelsen; Victor Verpillat; Yann Bargain
- Producers: Alan Walker; Yann Bargain; Victor Verpillat; Mood Melodies

Alan Walker singles chronology
"Darkside" (2018)	"Diamond Heart" (2018)	"Different World" (2018)

Music video
- "Diamond Heart" on YouTube

"Diamond Heart" is a song by Norwegian DJ and record producer Alan Walker, featuring Swedish singer-songwriter Sophia Somajo. The song was released on 28 September 2018 via MER Recordings as the third single from Walker's debut album, Different World (2018). Two remixes were officially released, one by Syn Cole and one by Dzeko.

== Background ==
An early version of the song was debuted performance at Tomorrowland 2017. And 'Diamond Heart' is a lyrically driven track.

== Composition ==
Billboard mentioned: "Walker's bouncing rhythm and Sophia Somajo's bullet-proof performance comes through slightly tropical."

== Critical reception ==
We Rave You commented: "Atmospheric from the very first moments, the track centres around Somajo’s haunting vocals which effortlessly intertwine with the track’s addictive". EDM Sauce say: "Walker's breakthrough hit for a happy, catchy spirit that will hitting repeat as soon as this song ends."

== Music video ==
The video “Diamond Heart” is the third and the final chapter of the World of Walker trilogy. And directed by Kristian Berg.

== Charts ==
=== Weekly charts ===
Chart (2018–19)	Peak position
Austria (Ö3 Austria Top 40)	56
Belgium (Ultratop 50 Flanders)	29
Belgium (Ultratip Bubbling Under Wallonia)	4
Finland (Suomen virallinen lista)	2
Germany (GfK)	89
Hungary (Single Top 40)	12
Netherlands (Dutch Top 40)	9
Netherlands (Single Top 100)	27
Norway (VG-lista)	1
Poland Airplay (ZPAV)	8
Sweden (Sverigetopplistan)	11
US Hot Dance/Electronic Songs (Billboard)	28

=== Year-end charts ===
Chart (2019)	Position
Belgium (Ultratop Flanders)	97
Netherlands (Dutch Top 40)	26
Netherlands (Single Top 100)	73
Norway (VG-lista)	32
Poland (ZPAV)	75
US Hot Dance/Electronic Songs (Billboard)	94

== Certifications ==
Region	Certification	Certified units/sales
Canada (Music Canada)	Gold	40,000^{‡}
Poland (ZPAV)	Platinum	20,000^{‡}
Switzerland (IFPI Switzerland)	Gold	10,000^{‡}
Streaming
Sweden (GLF)	2× Platinum	16,000,000^{†}
^{‡} Sales+streaming figures based on certification alone.^{†} Streaming-only figures based on certification alone.
