= Better Off (Alone, Pt. III) =

2023 single by Alan Walker, Dash Berlin and Vikkstar

Single by Alan Walker, Dash Berlin and Vikkstar

from the album Walkerworld
- Released: 28 September 2023
- Genre: EDM; Eurodance
- Length: 2:31
- Label: MER; Columbia
- Songwriters: Alan Walker; Eelke Kalberg; Fredrik Borch Olsen; Gunnar Greve; Ida Botten; Kasper; Marcus Arnbekk; Ryan Fieret; Mats Lie Skåre; Sebastiaan Molijn; Vikram Barn
- Producers: Alan Walker; Eelke Kalberg; Kasper; Ryan Fieret; Sebastiaan Molijn; Vikram Barn

Alan Walker singles chronology
| "Endless Summer" (2023) | "Better Off (Alone, Pt. III)" (2023) | "Heart Over Mind" (2023) |

Dash Berlin singles chronology
| "Time After Time" (2022) | "Better Off (Alone, Pt. III)" (2023) |

Vikkstar singles chronology
| "Better Off (Alone, Pt. III)" (2023) | "Humans" (2023) |

Music video
- "Better Off (Alone, Pt. III)" on YouTube

"Better Off (Alone, Pt. III)" is a song by British-Norwegian DJ and record producer Alan Walker, Dutch electronic DJ trio Dash Berlin and British YouTuber and DJ Vikram Barn better known as Vikkstar released by MER Musikk and Columbia Records on 28 September 2023. The song is Barn's debut single and is a part of a series of songs by Walker that includes his 2016 single "Alone" and his 2019 collaborative single "Alone, Pt. II" with Ava Max. The song heavily samples the 1998 single "Better Off Alone" written by Dash Berlin founding members Eelke Kalberg and Sebastiaan Molijn as part of Eurodance project Alice Deejay.

== Background ==
Walker and Barn met over five years before the release of the song. Walker stated that working with Dash Berlin and Barn had been a "creative whirlwind" and that they have "reimagined a beloved 90s gem, infusing it with a contemporary twist that's bound to resonate with fans old and new". He added that the collaboration "embodies the magic of music—a fusion of nostalgia and innovation". Barn stated that it had been an honour that his debut single was a collaboration with Walker and Dash Berlin whom he described as having a "legendary reputation". Dash Berlin member Ryan Fieret, who has been the frontman of the group since 2022, said he was "proud to be a part of this momentous team up" in celebrating 25 years since the release of "Better Off Alone".

== Critical reception ==
Malvika Padin of Earmilk said that the song had an "uplifting vibe wrapped around it" and that Walker's Alone series was a "meaningful trilogy built on notes of positivity, unity and encouragement both on and off the dance floor". Niko Sani of EDM.com stated that Alan Walker with the "help of Dash Berlin and Vikkstar [has] crafted a track filled to the brim with intoxicating nostalgia courtesy of its mesmerizing Eurodance beat". RouteNote's Jacca said, "The theme of togetherness and support runs through the foundation of each single, and nowhere is it more evident than in this song. "I think you better come along" puts the aural arm around the listener and takes them along on the journey that Alan Walker, Vikkstar, and Dash Berlin have taken".

== Music video ==
The music video for the song was shot at the Kykkelsrud power plant in Askim, Norway, produced and edited by Miriam Pedersen Eeg and Babatunde Adam Oluwalana, directed by Mads Neset, and executive produced by Gunnar Greve. The music video was released on YouTube on September 28, 2023, and has been viewed over 40 million times. MER's Baba Duwalana said in an interview with the Norwegian newspaper Smaalenenes Avis why they chose a power plant as the filming location: "We chose a power plant because it was a perfect fit for Alan Walker's dystopian poems." Rolf Engen, the power plant's director, said in an interview, "We were thrilled to be able to welcome such a big star to the power plant." MER also recruited local youth to participate in the video. "We needed to fill the venue, and we wanted to bring in new faces. A lot of the values of the Alan Walker community are that anyone can come and you don't have to wear a mask," Duwalana said.

=== Synopsis ===
It starts with Walkers in a room, where they are seen producing many CDs. Suddenly, a Walker chased by Red Nexus soldiers outside alerts them, prompting the others to escape before it gets raided. They passed on the CDs until they eventually reach the Red Nexus building, where Alan Walker, Dash Berlin, and Vikkstar play the song through their speakers and celebrates.

== Track listing ==
Digital download - single
| No. | Title | Length |
|---|---|---|
| 1. | "Better Off (Alone, Pt. III)" | 2:31 |

Digital download - D-Block & S-te-Fan Remix
| No. | Title | Length |
|---|---|---|
| 1. | "Better Off (Alone, Pt. III)" (D-Block & S-te-Fan Remix) | 2:58 |

Digital download - Timmy Trumpet Remix
| No. | Title | Length |
|---|---|---|
| 1. | "Better Off (Alone, Pt. III)" (Timmy Trumpet Remix) | 2:42 |

== Charts ==
=== Weekly charts ===
Weekly chart performance for "Better Off (Alone, Pt. III)"
| Chart (2023–2024) | Peak position |
|---|---|
| Hungary (Dance Top 40) | 3 |
| Hungary (Rádiós Top 40) | 1 |
| New Zealand Hot Singles (RMNZ) | 26 |
| Norway (VG-lista) | 30 |
| South Korea BGM (Circle) | 89 |
| Sweden Heatseeker (Sverigetopplistan) | 3 |
| UK Singles Downloads (Official Charts) | 19 |
| UK Singles Sales (OCC) | 23 |
| US Hot Dance/Electronic Songs (Billboard) | 32 |

=== Year-end charts ===
2024 year-end chart performance for "Better Off (Alone, Pt. III)"
| Chart (2024) | Position |
|---|---|
| Hungary (Dance Top 40) | 8 |
| Hungary (Rádiós Top 40) | 20 |
| US Hot Dance/Electronic Songs (Billboard) | 98 |

2025 year-end chart performance for "Better Off (Alone, Pt. III)"
| Chart (2025) | Position |
|---|---|
| Hungary (Dance Top 40) | 15 |

== Certifications ==
Certifications for "Better Off (Alone, Pt. III)"
| Region | Certification | Certified units/sales |
|---|---|---|
| Canada (Music Canada) | Gold | 40,000^{‡} |
| New Zealand (RMNZ) | Gold | 15,000^{‡} |
| United Kingdom (BPI) | Silver | 200,000^{‡} |
^{‡} Sales+streaming figures based on certification alone.
