= It's My Birthday =

Single by will.i.am featuring Cody Wise
- Released: May 27, 2014
- Recorded: 2014
- Genre: Electro-hop
- Length: 4:14
- Label: Interscope
- Songwriters: William Adams; A. R. Rahman; Keith Harris; Cody Wise; Damien LeRoy
- Producers: will.i.am; DJ Ammo

will.i.am singles chronology
"Feelin' Myself" (2013)	"It's My Birthday" (2014)	"Home" (2014)

Cody Wise singles chronology
"It's My Birthday" (2014)	"I'm So Excited" (2014)

Music video
- "It's My Birthday" on YouTube

"It's My Birthday" (originally "Birthday") is a song by American rapper will.i.am featuring American singer Cody Wise. The song was recorded in 2014 and released as a single on May 27. The song is about celebrating every day as if it's your birthday. The song samples the Indian song "Urvasi Urvasi" from the soundtrack of the 1994 Indian Tamil-language film Kaadhalan, composed by the Academy award winner and Indian composer A. R. Rahman. The song also includes samples of the Jamaican track "Fi Di Jockey" by Aidonia and Di Genius. It received mixed to negative reviews from music critics, with some being negative towards will.i.am's lack of originality.

An accompanying music video was released in May 2014 to YouTube and Vine respectively. "It's My Birthday" topped the charts in the United Kingdom and peaked within the top ten of the charts in Australia. It was certified Platinum in the United Kingdom and Australia. In the former country, will.i.am and Wise performed the song on the eight season of Britain's Got Talent in May 2014.

== Background and composition ==
Wise was spotted by will.i.am after a performance of "Who's Lovin' You" by the Jackson 5 at a concert when he was 13 years old. After will.i.am saw Wise's performance, he flew Wise out and the two met. Wise was signed to Interscope Records in early 2014 through the imprint of will.i.am and he recalled being offered a deal with the label a few days after singing for will.i.am and Interscope co-founder Jimmy Iovine. After developing his musical skills with will.i.am as his protégé, the two recorded "It's My Birthday" in 2014; the song has subsequently become what Wise is best known for.

"It's My Birthday" is a hip hop track that includes usage of Auto-Tune. will.i.am explained the meaning of it during a web exclusive for The Tonight Show Starring Jimmy Fallon on July 29, 2014 where he was joined by Wise, saying: "You get a license to do whatever you want on your birthday. I try to live in that celebrative, who-gives-a-f perspective and celebrate every day as if it was my birthday." The song uses a sample of composer A. R. Rahman's track "Urvasi Urvasi", from the soundtrack of the 1994 Tamil film Kaadhalan, for both its intro and outro. A. R. Rahman revealed on May 21 via Twitter that he was partnering with will.i.am to recreate an early track of his, with will.i.am tweeting out thanks to Rahman the next day. will.i.am spoke about the process of sampling "Urvasi Urvasi" as part of the web exclusive on July 29, saying "We took portions of that song and put it over today's thick, urban electronic-type beat." The song contains an additional sample of the Jamaican track "Fi Di Jockey" by Aidonia and Bounty Killer, with vocals from Aidonia sampled on the chorus and Bounty Killer's chanting of his "Big Ship Sailing" catchphrase also sampled in the song.

"It's My Birthday" is written in the key of F minor and at a tempo of 100 beats per minute (BPM).

== Release and reception ==
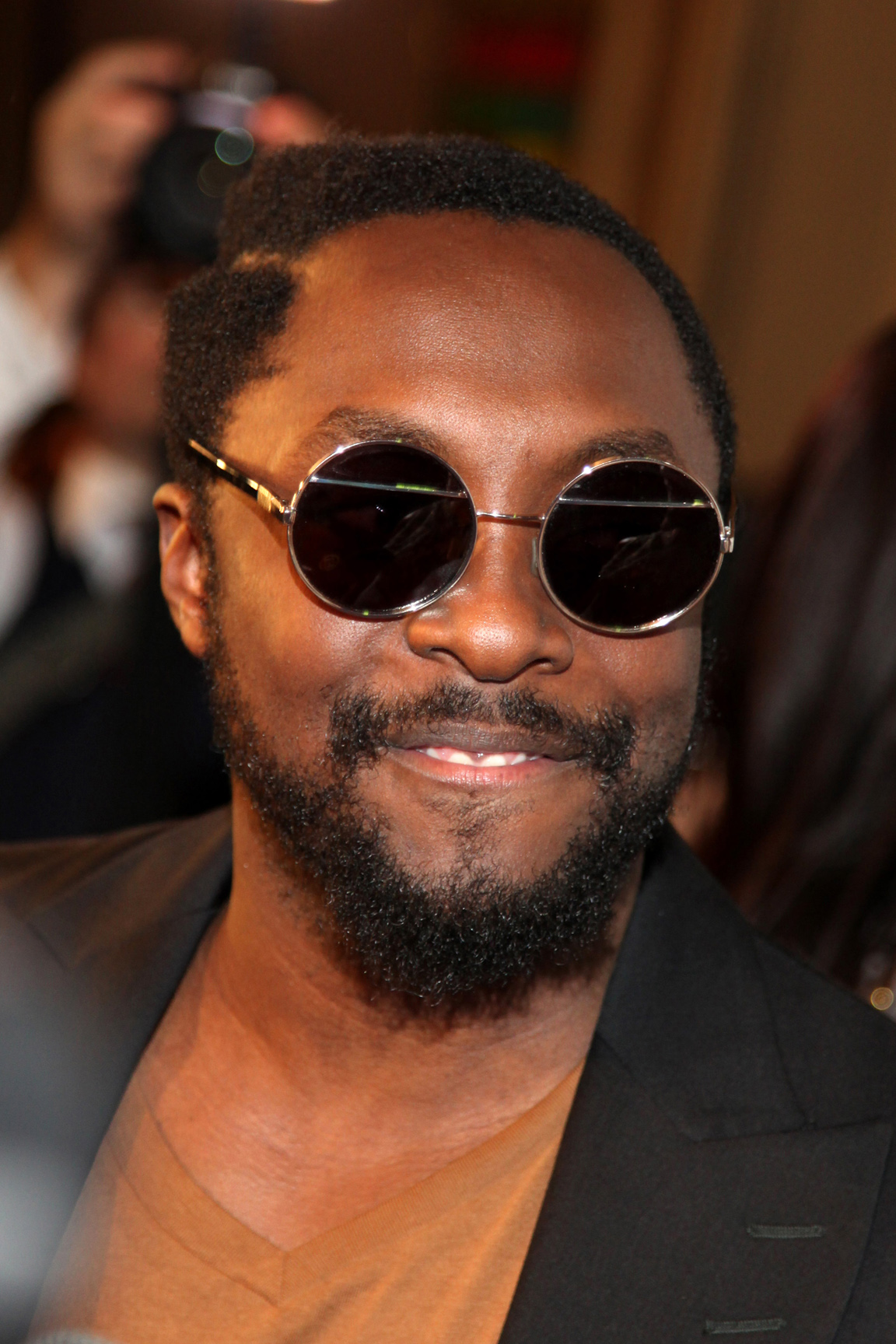
will.i.am announced a single for release with Cody Wise in May 2014.

The song was originally set to be titled "Birthday" when will.i.am announced on May 21, 2014 that he was planning to release it as a single with Wise on July 6. That same day, a snippet was shared of the song. "It's My Birthday" was released for digital download as a single in Australia and the United States on May 27 and May 29 respectively, marking will.i.am's first musical release since the album #willpower in 2013. The song was later serviced to US rhythmic contemporary radio stations on June 24, 2014, and released as a single in the United Kingdom on July 6, as previously announced by will.i.am.

"It's My Birthday" received mixed to negative reviews from music critics, with will.i.am's lack of originality being mostly panned. Lewis Corner of Digital Spy gave the song three out of five stars, stating: "The final result doesn't wander too far away from his recent successful offerings, but with a hint of the new here and there, will.i.am proves once again he can have his cake and eat it whether it's his birthday or not." Christina Lee of Idolator wrote that "it's rather telling that not even the most bizarre parts of 'It's My Birthday' can distract from the cringeworthy lyrics ('Que bonita, que bonita / I can speak in Japanese / Kawaii, kawaii / Kawaii, I want your body')." RouteNote author RouteBot labelled the song as the worst of 2014, writing: "I actually thought that English was the performers second language, but then I realised it was Will.i.am! Terrible! What the hell has happened to pop music..." Trevor Smith of HotNewHipHop wrote in response to the song: "The rapper/producer channels Bollywood on his new cut, which is more a showcase of Cody Wise's vocals than Will's. It also features some instrumental breaks, placing it firmly in more of an EDM sphere."

== Music video ==
The music video was uploaded to YouTube on May 28, 2014, shot in the square aspect ratio of software Vine and directed by Ben Mor. It was uploaded to Vine the next day as over 40 separate clips. The video, which utilizes claymation, features both will.i.am and Wise. Its scenes include a birthday party going wrong, twerking in a room decorated with pizzas and will.i.am posing as a priest and as Jesus. He can be seen at one point in the delivery room taking a selfie while a woman gives birth to a will.i.am lookalike. Popular Viners such as Giovanni Watson, DeStorm Power, King Bach, Alpha Cat and Jerry Purdrank also appear.

== Commercial performance ==
In the United Kingdom, "It's My Birthday" peaked at the top of the UK Singles Chart on July 13, 2014 – for the week ending date July 19, 2014 – becoming will.i.am's tenth chart-topping song in Britain. He scored five of these chart-toppers as a solo artist and five as a member of the Black Eyed Peas respectively, with the first being "Where Is the Love?" in 2003. Liv Moss of the Official Charts Company reported on July 9, 2014 that the song was on track to reach number one on the chart before its position was officially announced. The song's combined sales figure was 42,000 on the day of Moss' report, one percent of which was due to audio streams. "It's My Birthday" became Britain's 51st best-selling song of 2014. On September 17, 2021, it was certified Platinum by the British Phonographic Industry.

In Australia, "It's My Birthday" peaked at number four on the ARIA Singles Chart and spending a total of 16 weeks on the chart. The song was certified Platinum in 2014 by the Australian Recording Industry Association. It ranked at number 74 on the year-end ARIA Singles Chart for 2014.

"It's My Birthday" also debuted within the top 40 of charts in New Zealand, Ireland and Belgium. On the German Top 100 Singles chart, the song peaked at number 41. It reached number 58 and number 71 on the Slovakia Singles Digitál Top 100 and Czech Republic Singles Digitál Top 100 respectively. It performed the worst in France, charting at number 168 on the SNEP chart.

== Live performances ==
will.i.am and Wise performed the song in the United Kingdom on May 29, 2014, appearing on the fourth semi-final of the eight season of Britain's Got Talent, with will.i.am dancing around in pink during the performance. This marked will.i.am's debut appearance on Britain's Got Talent. On July 21, the duo performed "It's My Birthday" with virtual body doubles on The Voice Australia, which was said to be "one of the biggest performances of the whole night." On July 29, 2014, they performed the song on The Tonight Show Starring Jimmy Fallon, accompanied by the Roots, and again at the first ever BBC Music Awards on December 11, 2014.

== Credits and personnel ==
Credits adapted from Tidal.

- Main artist – will.i.am
- Featured artist – Cody Wise
- Associated performer – Cody Wise, will.i.am
- Vocals – Cody Wise, will.i.am
- Producer – Damien LeRoy, will.i.am
- Composer & lyricist – A. R. Rahman, Cody Wise, Damien LeRoy, Keith Harris, will.i.am

== Charts ==
=== Weekly charts ===
Weekly chart performance for "It's My Birthday"
Chart (2014)	Peak position
Australia (ARIA)	4
Belgium (Ultratip Bubbling Under Flanders)	23
Belgium (Ultratop Flanders Urban)	18
Czech Republic Singles Digital (ČNS IFPI)	71
France (SNEP)	167
Germany (GfK)	41
Ireland (IRMA)	25
Netherlands (Single Tip)	22
New Zealand (Recorded Music NZ)	16
Scottish Singles Sales (Official Charts)	2
Slovakia Singles Digital (ČNS IFPI)	58
UK Singles (Official Charts)	1
UK Hip Hop/R&B (Official Charts)	1

=== Year-end charts ===
Annual chart rankings for "It's My Birthday"
Chart (2014)	Position
Australia (ARIA)	74
UK Singles (OCC)	51

== Certifications ==
Region	Certification	Certified units/sales
Australia (ARIA)	Platinum	70,000^{^}
Germany (BVMI)	Gold	150,000^{‡}
New Zealand (RMNZ)	Gold	7,500^{*}
United Kingdom (BPI)	Platinum	600,000^{‡}
^{*} Sales figures based on certification alone.^{^} Shipments figures based on certification alone.^{‡} Sales+streaming figures based on certification alone.

== Release history ==
Region	Date	Format	Label	Ref.
Australia	May 27, 2014	Digital download	Interscope Records	
United States	May 29, 2014	Digital download	Interscope Records	
United States	June 24, 2014	Rhythmic contemporary radio	Interscope Records	
United Kingdom	July 6, 2014	Digital download	Interscope Records	

== See also ==
- List of top 10 singles in 2014 (Australia)
- List of UK Singles Chart number ones of the 2010s
- List of UK R&B Singles Chart number ones of 2014
