= List of UK singles chart number ones of the 2010s =

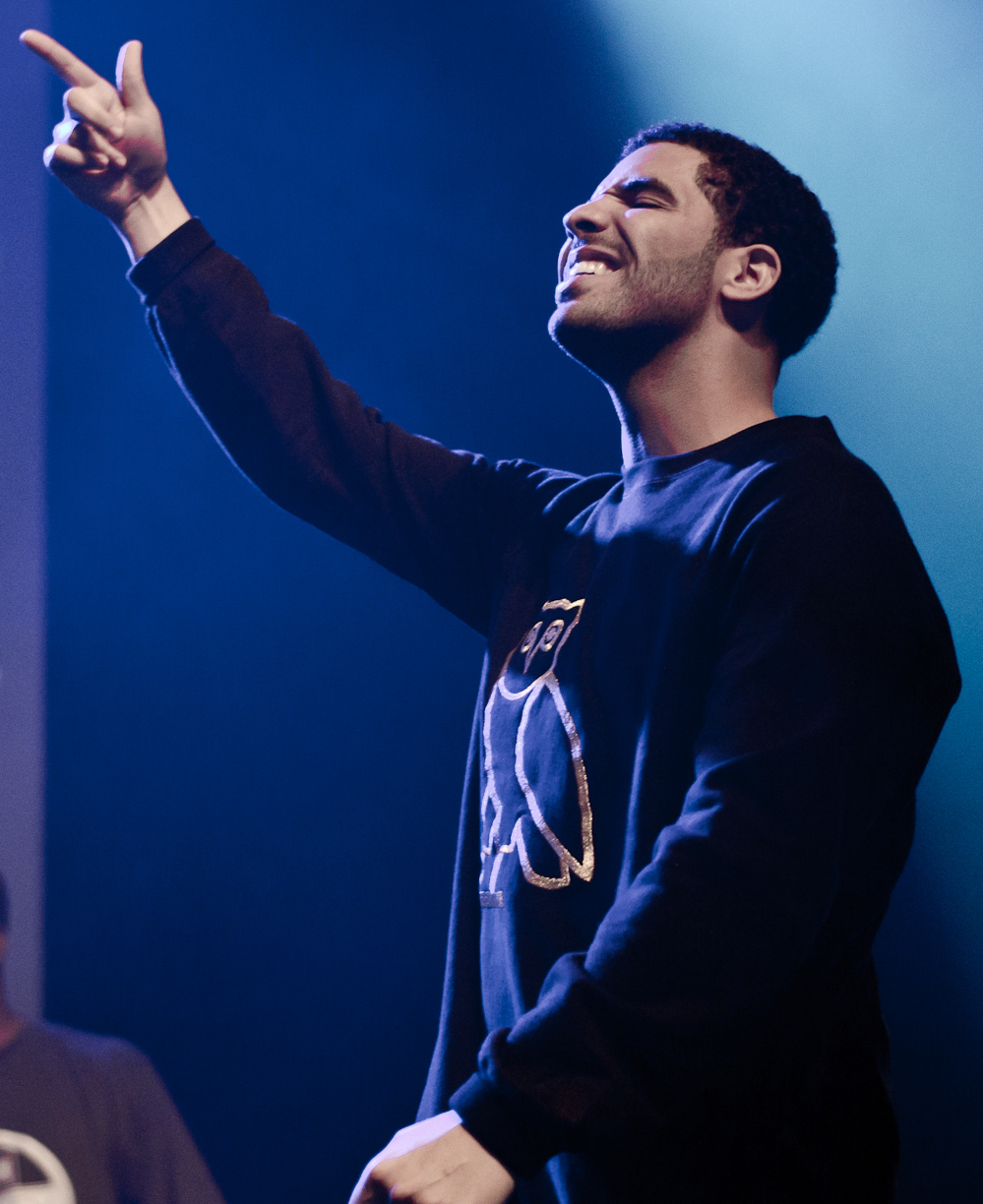
Canadian musician Drake had a 15-week run at the top of the UK singles chart in 2016 with "One Dance", featuring Wizkid and Kyla, the longest number-one since Wet Wet Wet's "Love Is All Around" in 1994. He then spent a further 14 weeks at the top in 2018 with "God's Plan", "Nice for What" and "In My Feelings", the former of which made him the only artist in UK chart history to have two songs spend at least nine weeks at number one.

The UK singles chart is a weekly record chart compiled by the Official Charts Company (OCC) on behalf of the British record industry. As of 10 July 2015, the chart week runs from Friday to Thursday with the chart-date given as the following Thursday. Before this, the chart week ran from Sunday to Saturday, with the chart date given as the following Saturday. During the 2010s, a total of 242 songs reached number one on the UK singles chart. Joe McElderry was the first artist to top the chart in the decade, when "The Climb" replaced "Killing in the Name" by Rage Against the Machine. The final number-one of the decade was the novelty song "I Love Sausage Rolls" by LadBaby.

Digital downloads made up the majority of music sales at the start of the decade. In 2011, singles sales hit an all-time high, a record that was then surpassed in 2012. From July 2014, as download sales began to decline, audio streaming began to be counted at a rate of 100 streams equivalent to a sale, later increased to 150 streams, and later still to 300 streams once a song had spent a certain time on the charts and its consumption had declined.

The following singles were all number one in the United Kingdom during the 2010s.

== Number-one singles ==
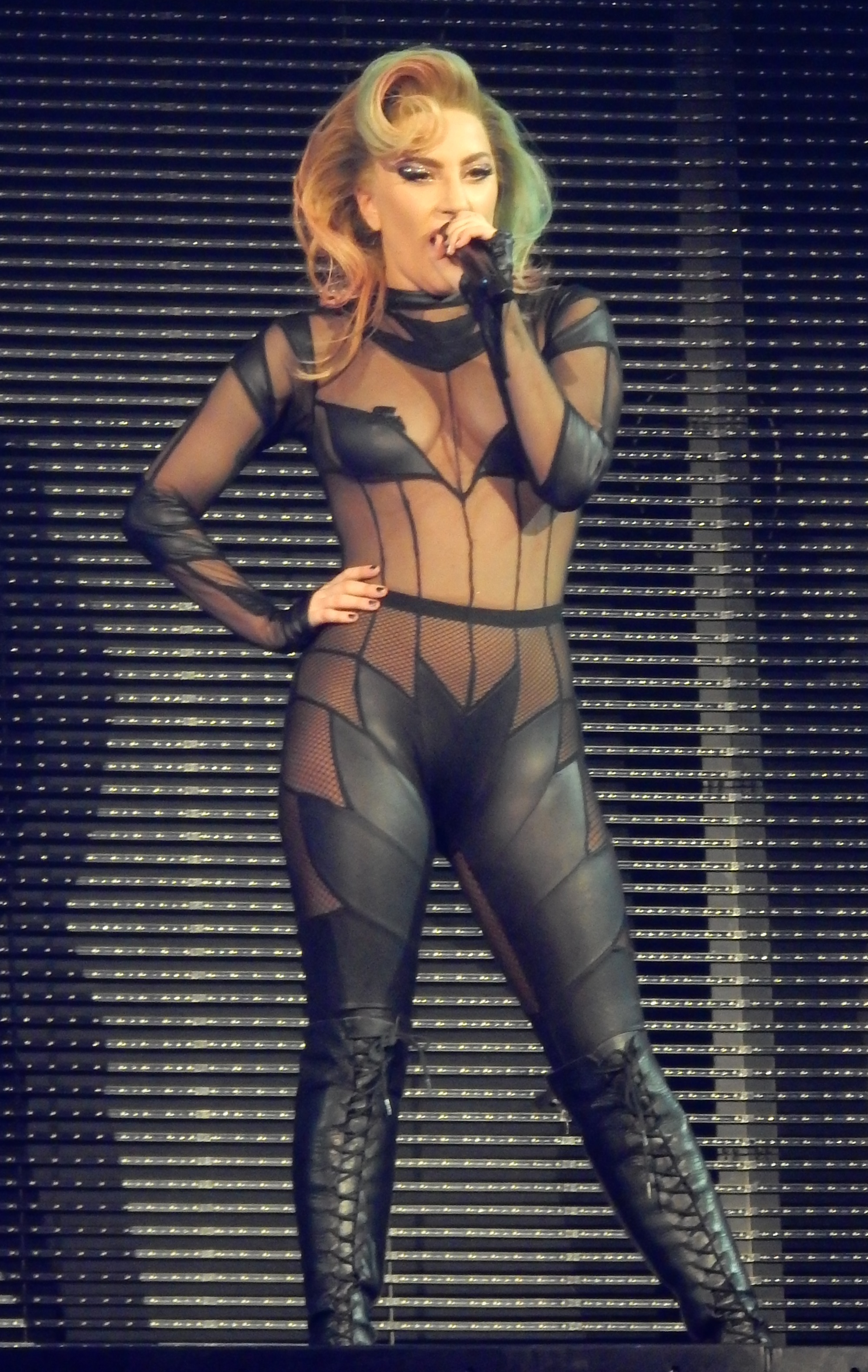
Lady Gaga reached number one with "Telephone" (featuring Beyoncé) in 2010 and "Shallow" (a duet with Bradley Cooper) in 2018.

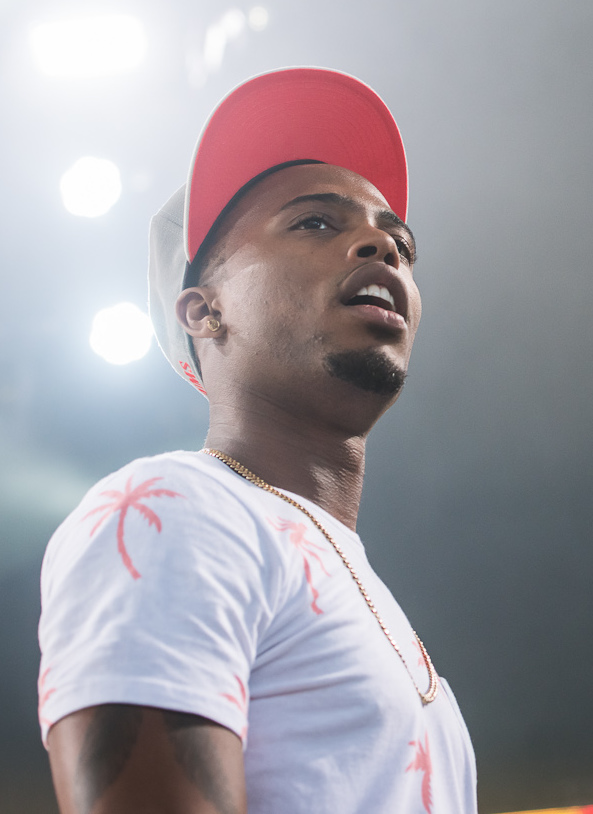
B.o.B achieved his first and second chart-topping singles in 2010 with "Nothin' on You" and "Airplanes". He then scored a third in 2011 with "Price Tag", a collaboration with Jessie J.

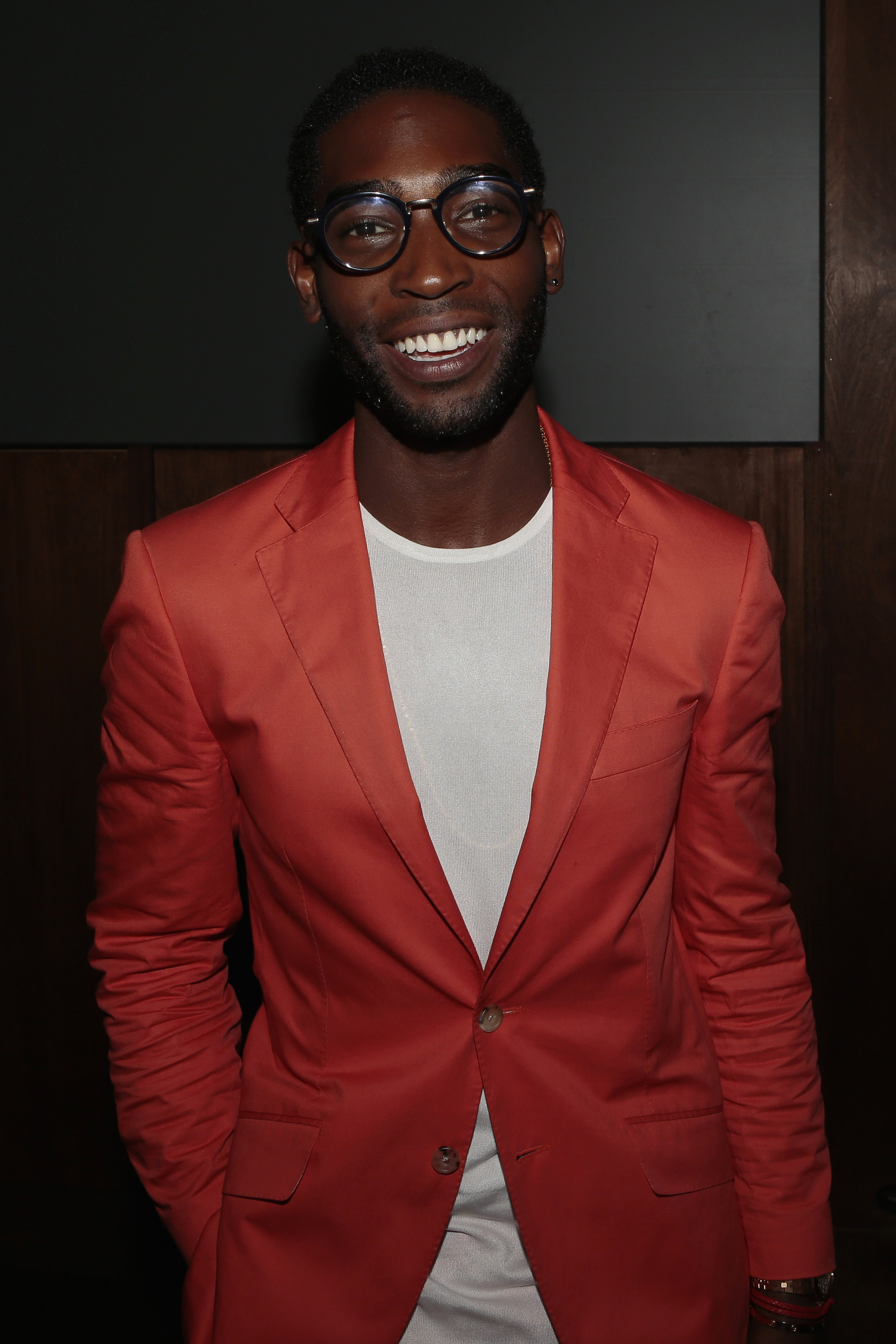
Tinie Tempah achieved his first number-one single in 2010 with "Pass Out", topping the charts again with "Written in the Stars" and "Not Letting Go", and as a featured artist on "R.I.P.", "Tsunami", "Crazy Stupid Love" and "Turn the Music Louder (Rumble)".

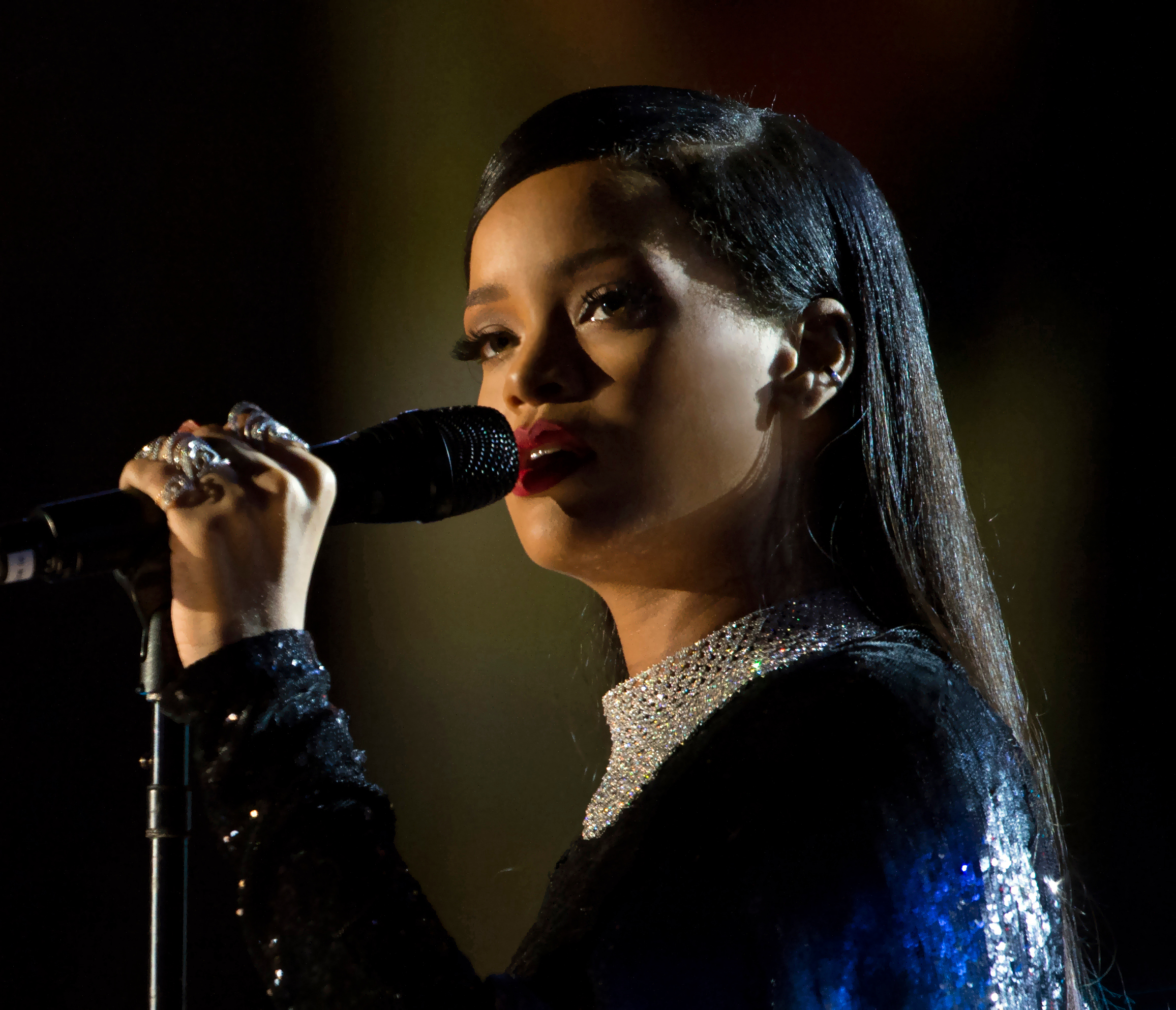
Rihanna broke her own record in 2013 by becoming the first female artist to have number-one singles in seven consecutive years. The singles include "Only Girl (In the World)" (2010), "We Found Love" (2011), "Diamonds" (2012) and "The Monster" (2013).

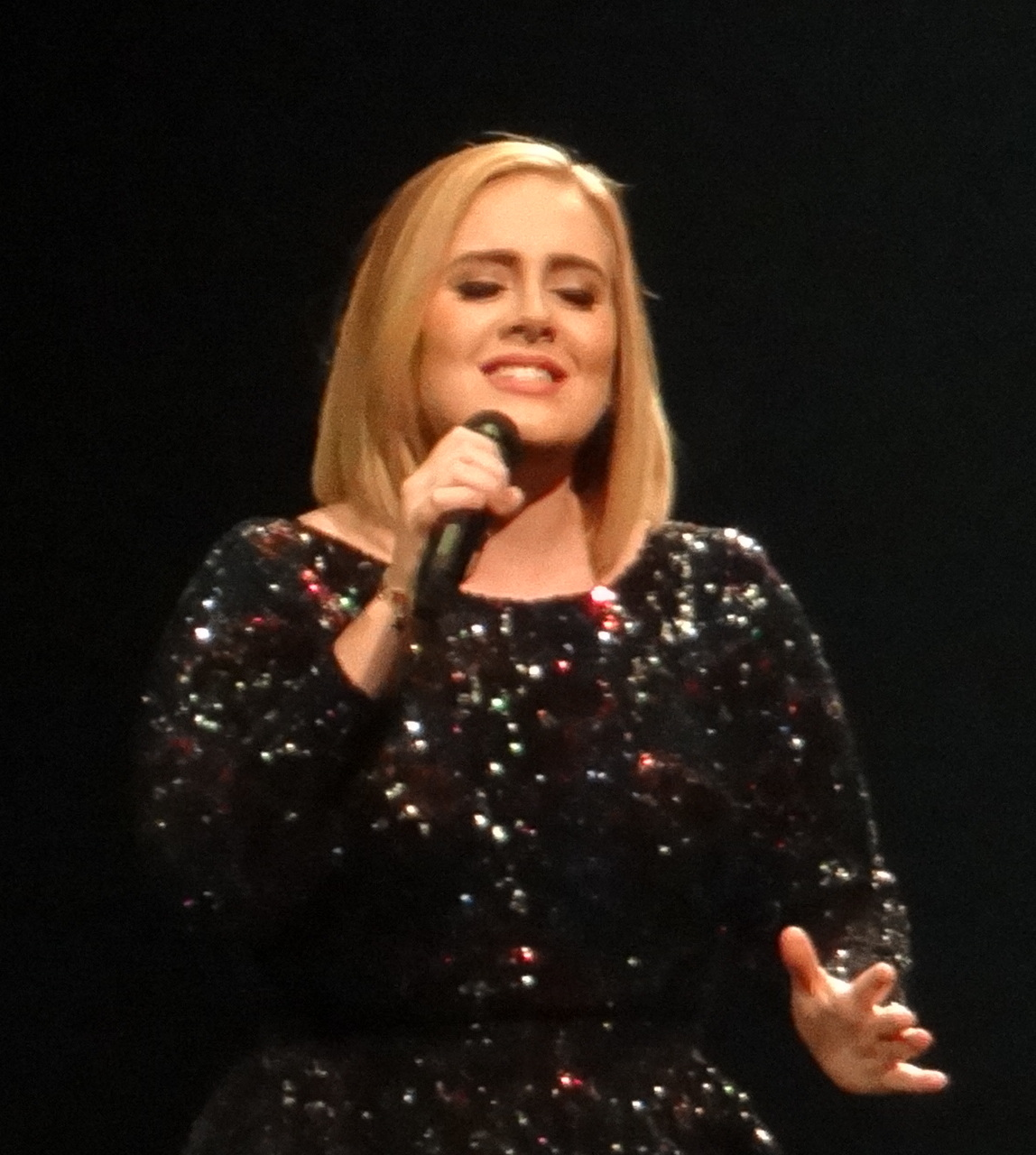
Adele achieved her first number-one single in February 2011 with "Someone like You", which became the year's biggest seller; having spent five weeks at the peak and sold over 1 million copies. The singer later broke records with her comeback single "Hello", which reached the number one spot in November 2015, staying there for three weeks.

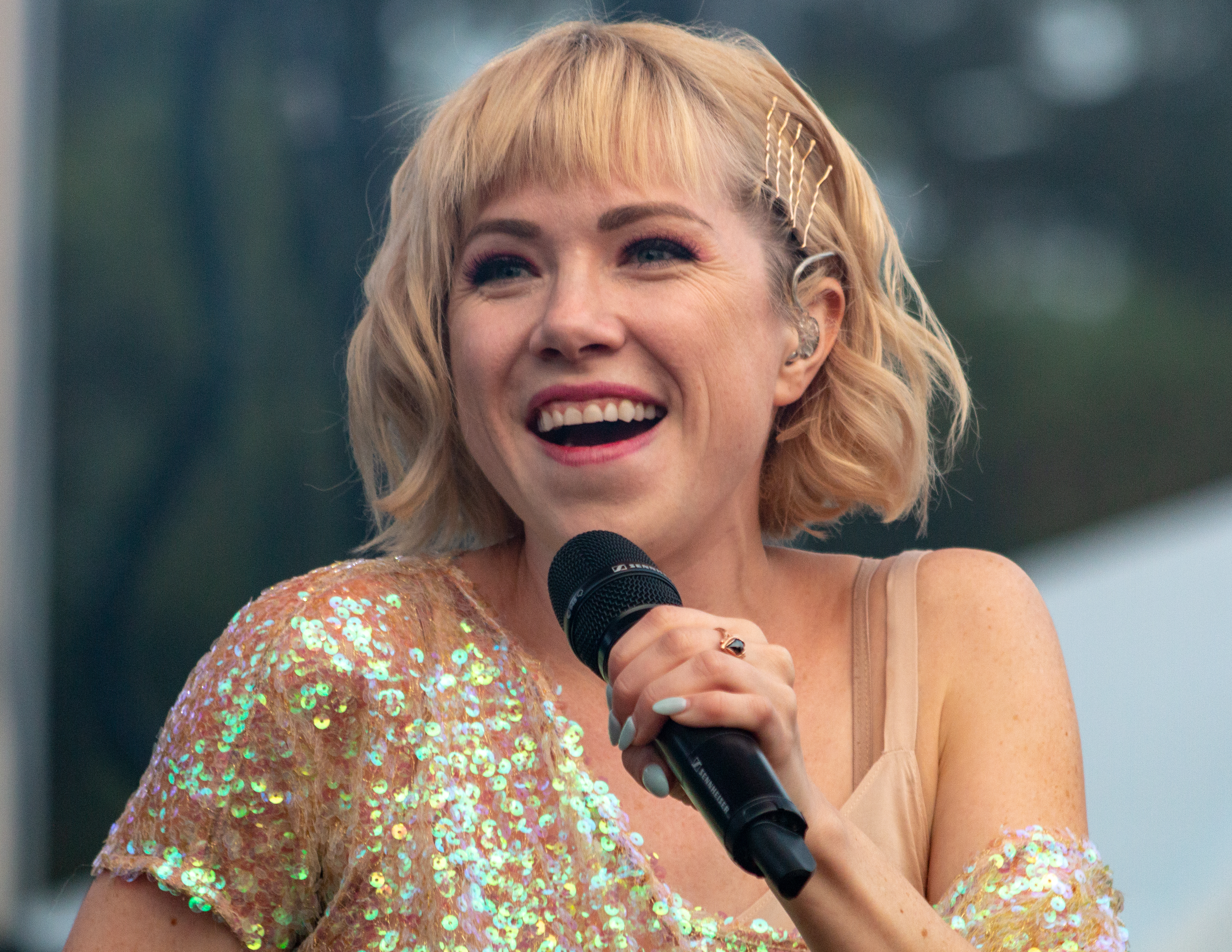
Canadian singer Carly Rae Jepsen achieved her first number-one single in 2012 with the international hit "Call Me Maybe", which spent four consecutive weeks at the summit.

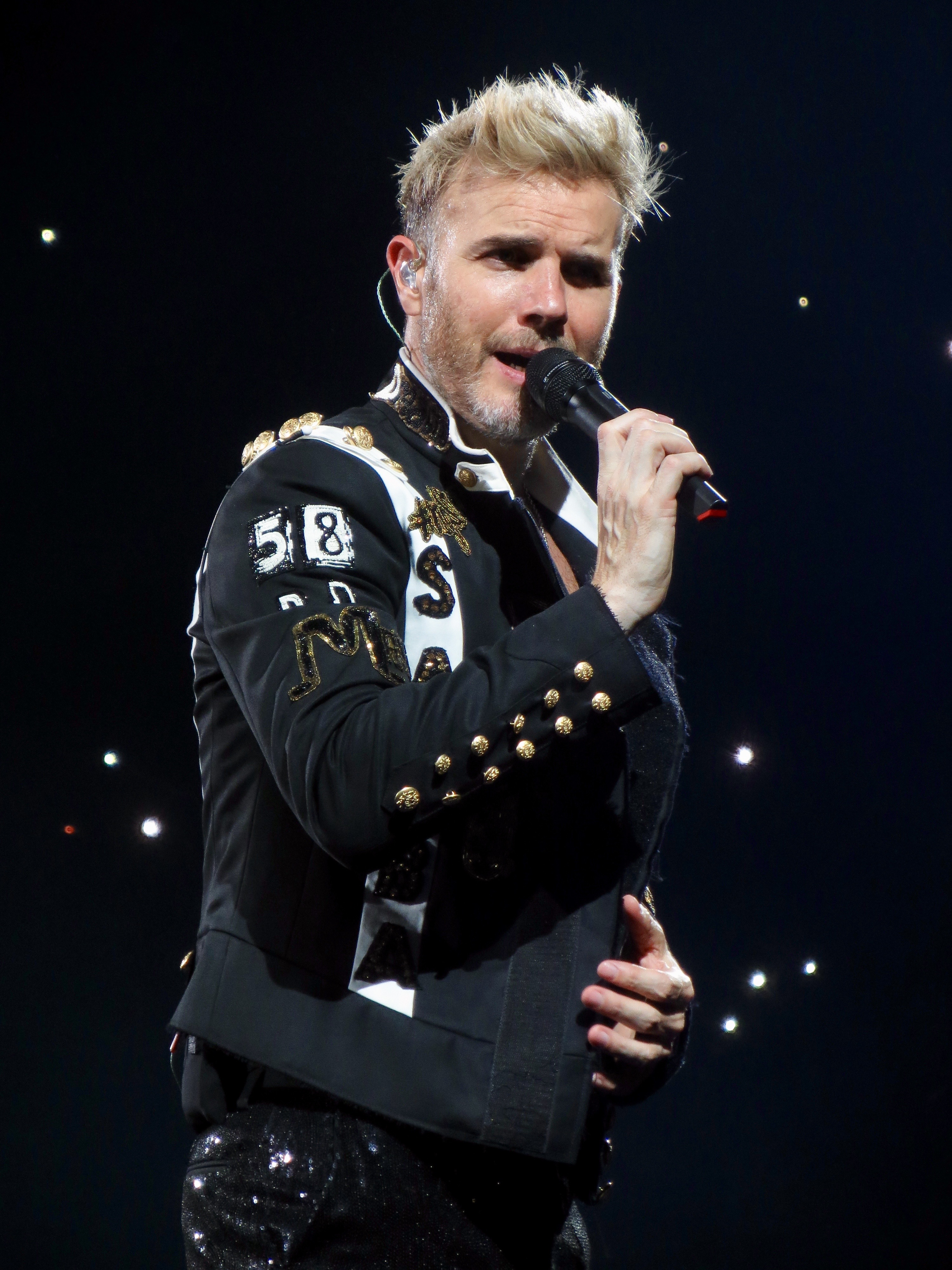
Gary Barlow achieved his fourteenth number-one single with "Sing"—whilst also becoming the first artist in 2012 to have the UK number-one single and album in the same week.

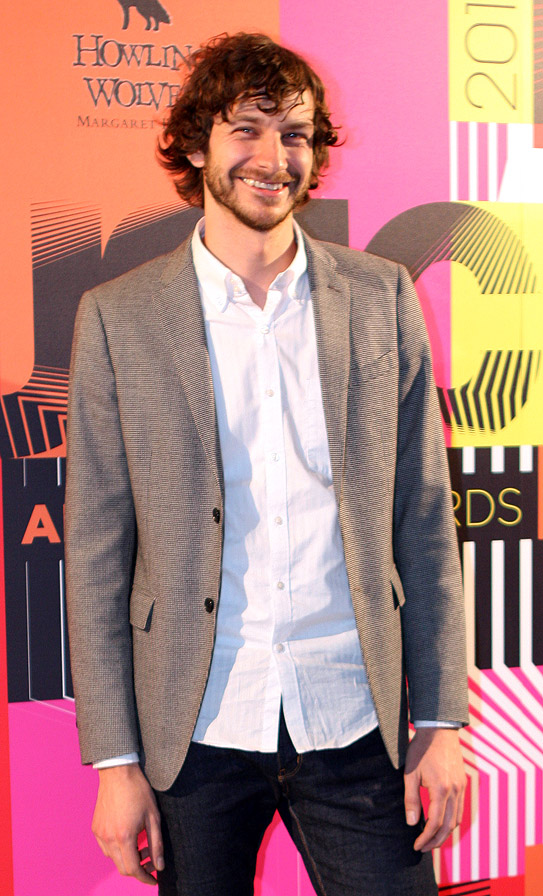
Belgian-Australian singer Gotye held the number-one spot for five weeks in 2012 with the year's biggest selling international hit "Somebody That I Used to Know", which featured Kimbra.

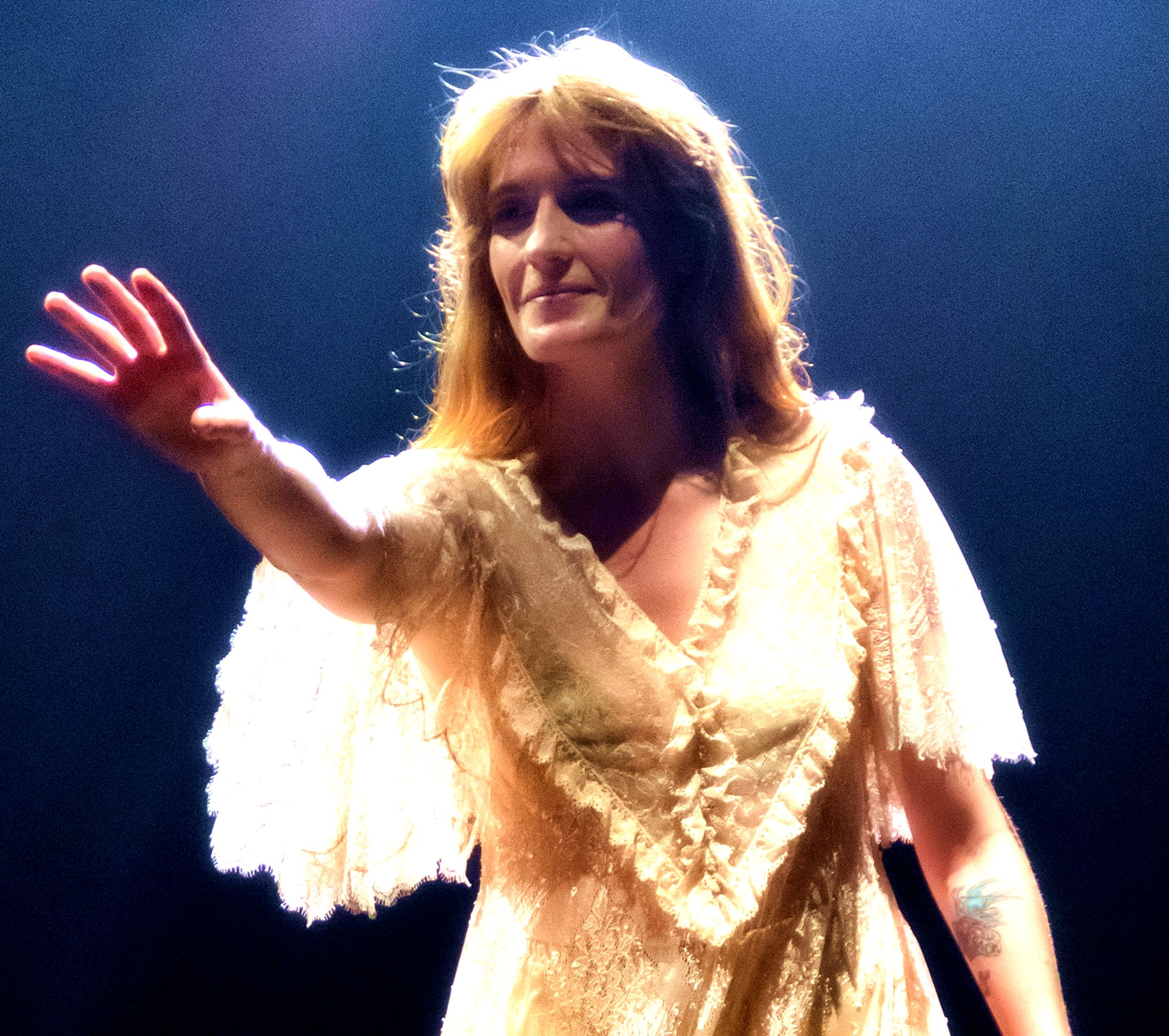
Florence and the Machine scored their first UK number-one single with "Spectrum (Say My Name)" in 2012, spending three weeks at number one.

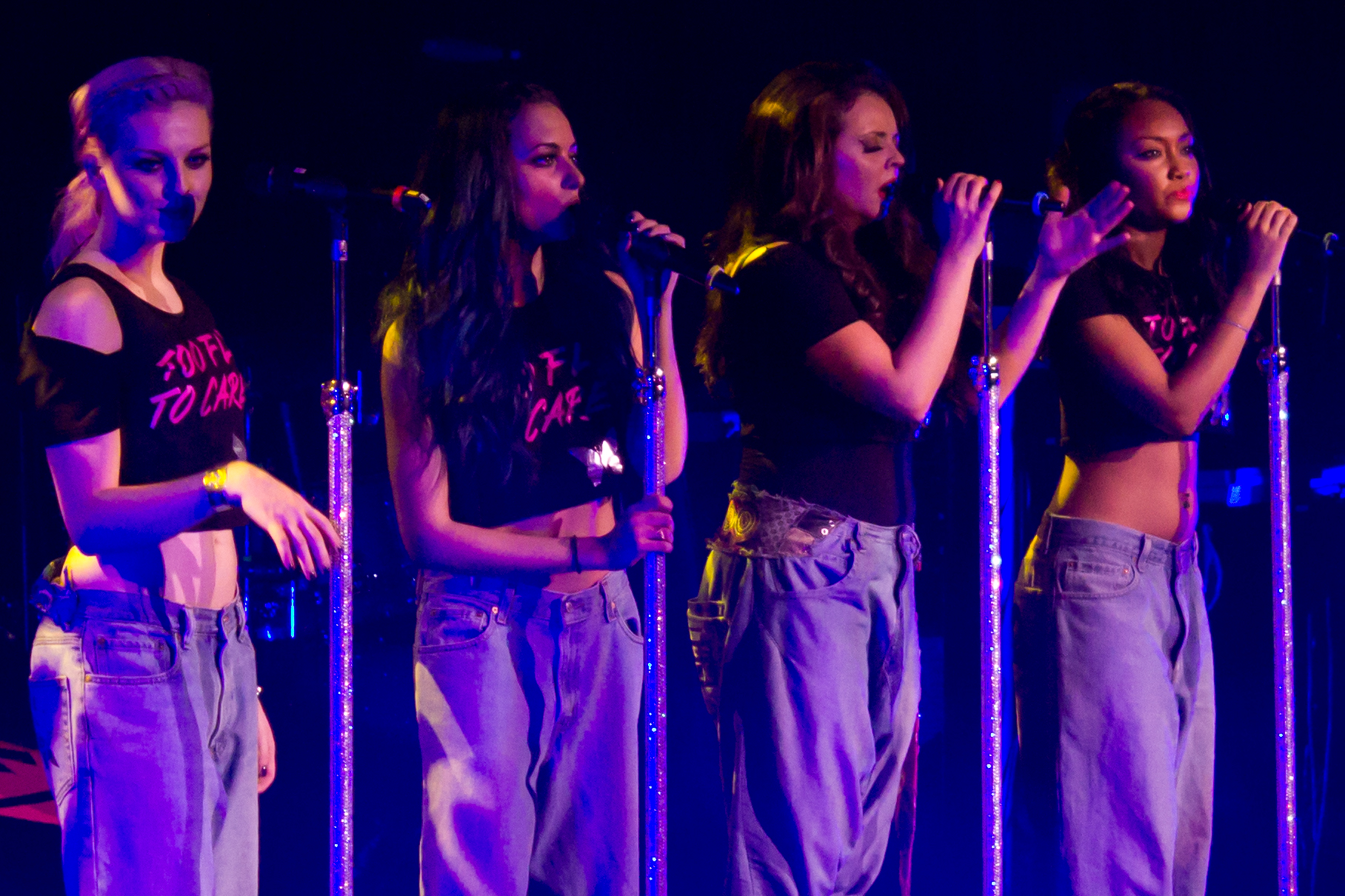
Girl group Little Mix became the first band to win The X Factor in 2011 and scored four number ones in the decade, with a cover of the Damien Rice song "Cannonball" in 2011, "Wings" in 2012, "Black Magic" in 2015 and "Shout Out to My Ex" in 2016.

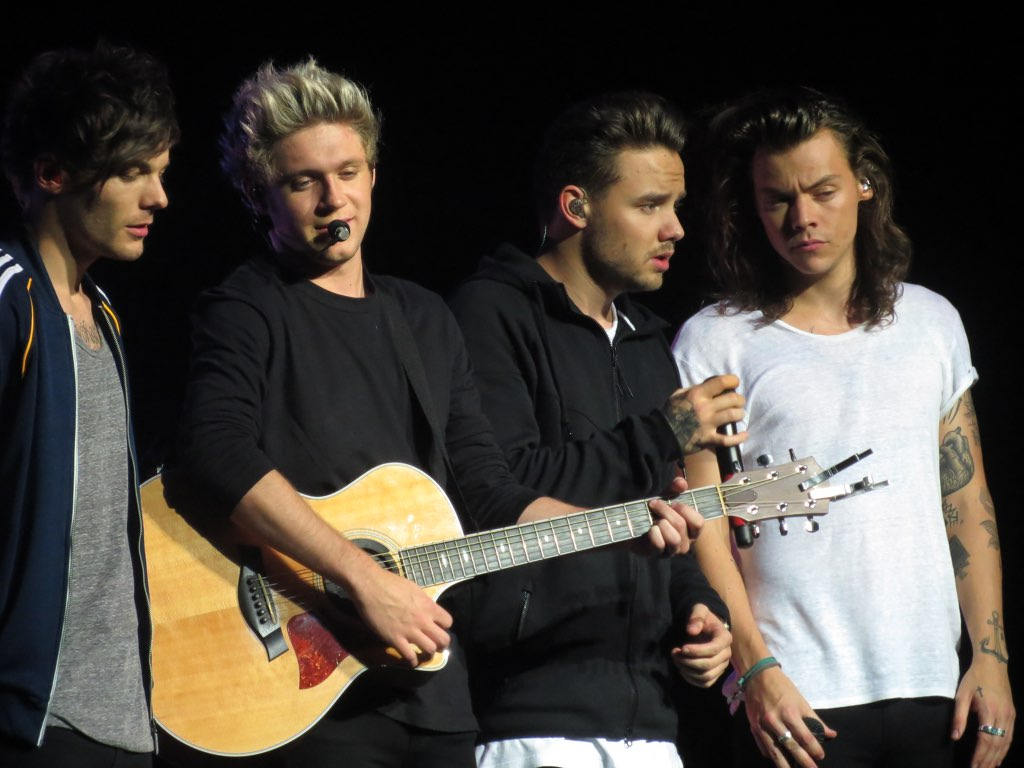
The X Factor boy band One Direction had a number-one single three years in a row with "What Makes You Beautiful" in 2011, "Little Things" in 2012, and "One Way or Another (Teenage Kicks)" in 2013, as well as their fourth UK number-one single, and first as a four-piece, "Drag Me Down" in 2015.

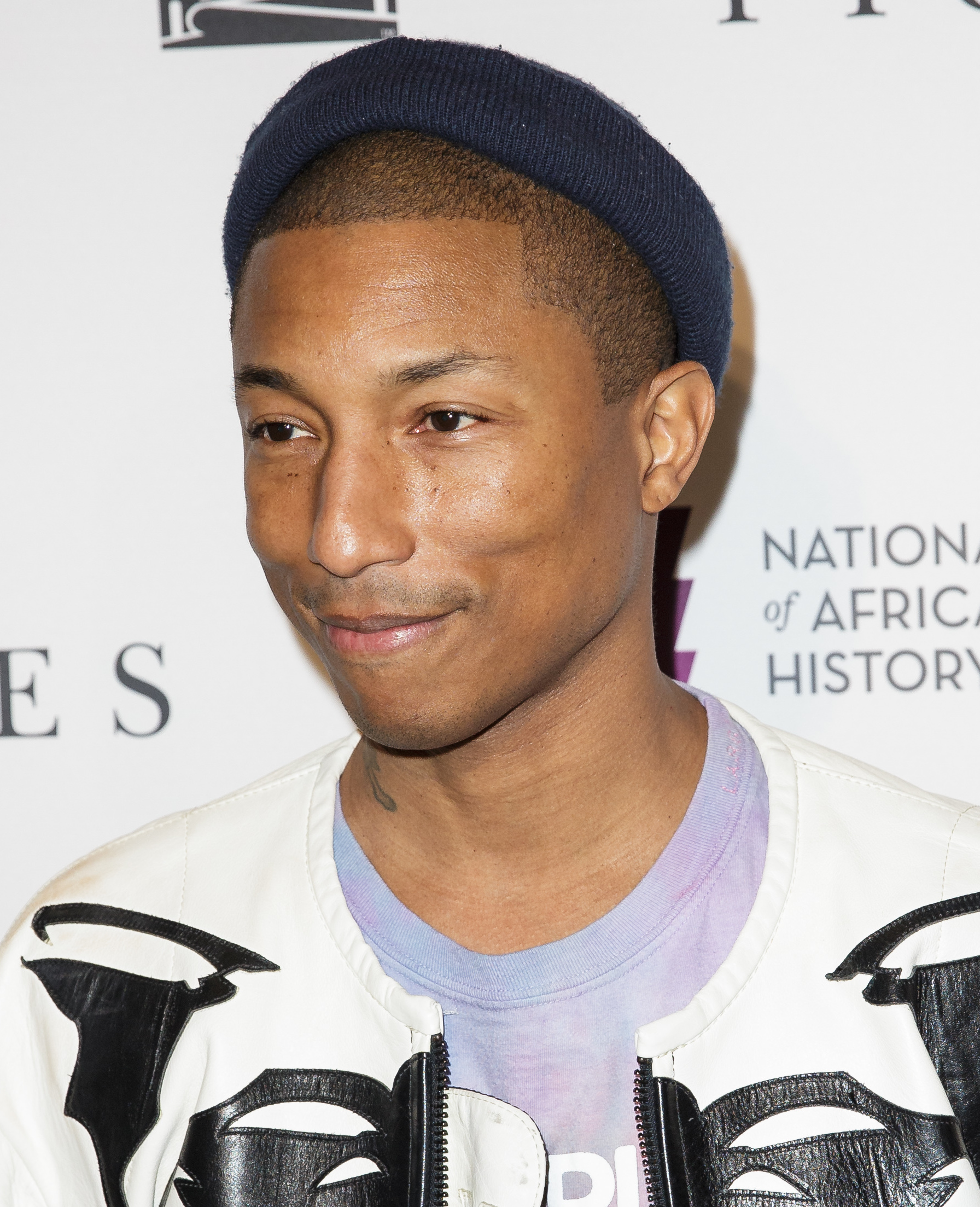
Pharrell Williams scored three number-one hits in 2013 after producing and being featured on the songs "Get Lucky" by Daft Punk, "Blurred Lines" by Robin Thicke, which also featured T.I., and his own song "Happy", which also topped the year end chart in 2014.

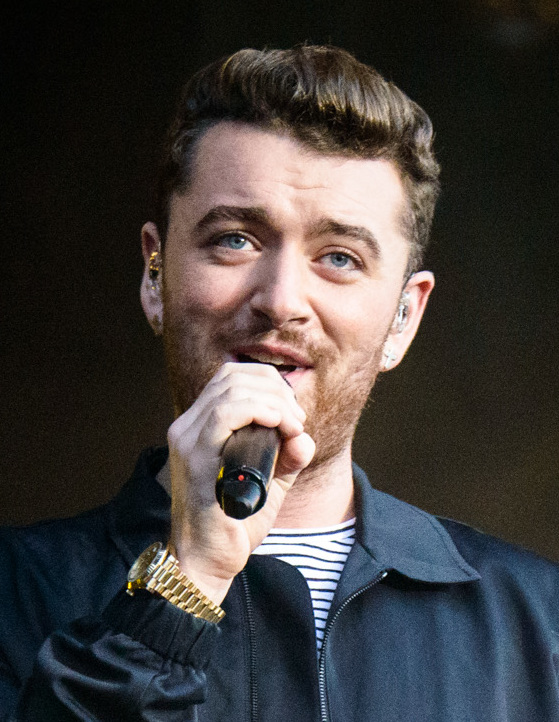
Sam Smith scored two solo number ones in 2014 with "Money on My Mind" and "Stay with Me", after featuring on "La La La" by Naughty Boy which topped the charts in 2013. In 2015, Smith scored fourth and fifth number-ones with "Lay Me Down" and "Writing's on the Wall", the theme for the James Bond film Spectre. Smith scored a further two number ones in 2017 and 2018 with "Too Good at Goodbyes" and "Promises", a collaboration with Calvin Harris.

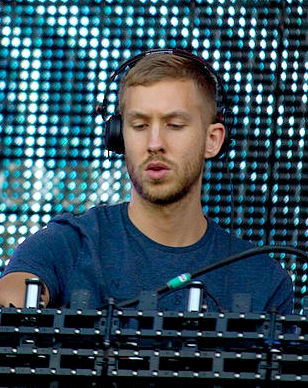
Calvin Harris achieved the joint most number ones in the 2010s decade, with eight; his collaboration with Rihanna on "We Found Love" in 2011, "Sweet Nothing" in 2012, "Under Control" in 2013, "Summer" and "Blame" in 2014, "Feels" in 2017, and "One Kiss" and "Promises" in 2018. "One Kiss" was the best selling single of 2018.

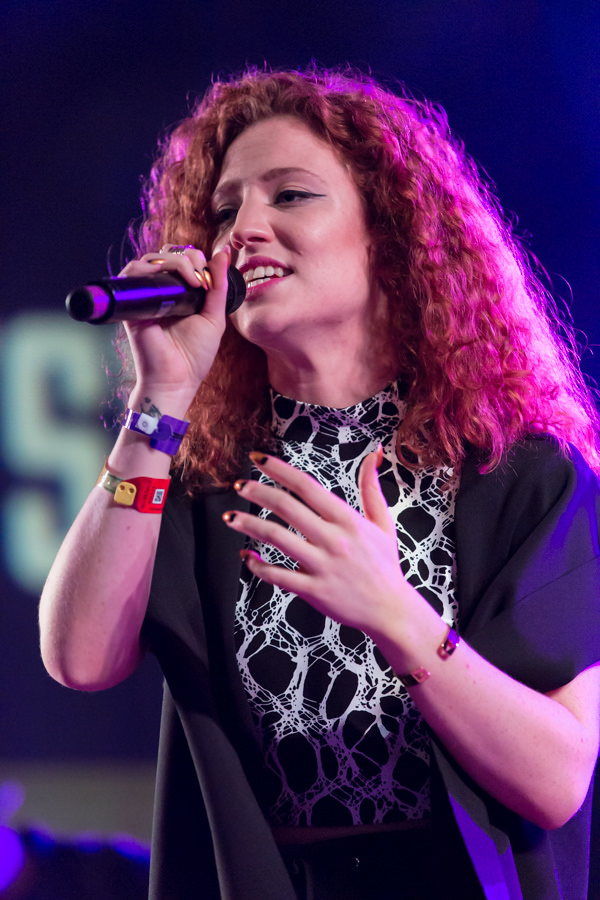
Jess Glynne made chart history in 2015, scoring her fifth number one in just 18 months; the fastest for a British female artist in the UK. In 2018, she broke the record for most number ones for female artist, with seven, breaking Cheryl's record of five number ones.

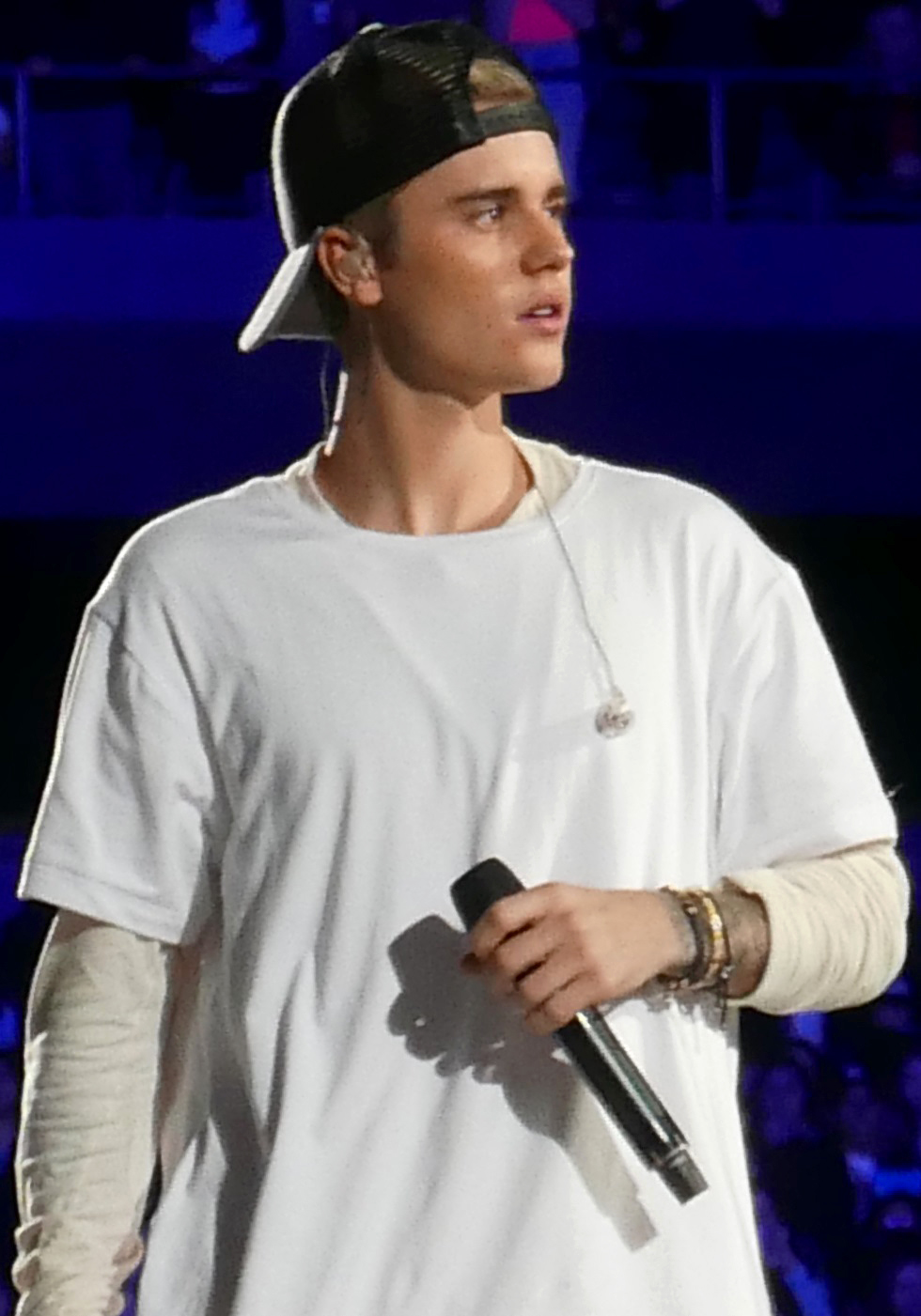
Justin Bieber achieved his first three number one singles in 2015, with "What Do You Mean?", "Sorry", and "Love Yourself", for a total of thirteen weeks at number one. Bieber was also featured on the number one singles "Cold Water" in 2016, and "I'm the One", and "Despacito (Remix)" in 2017. He attained his seventh number one of the decade in 2019 with "I Don't Care", a collaboration with Ed Sheeran.

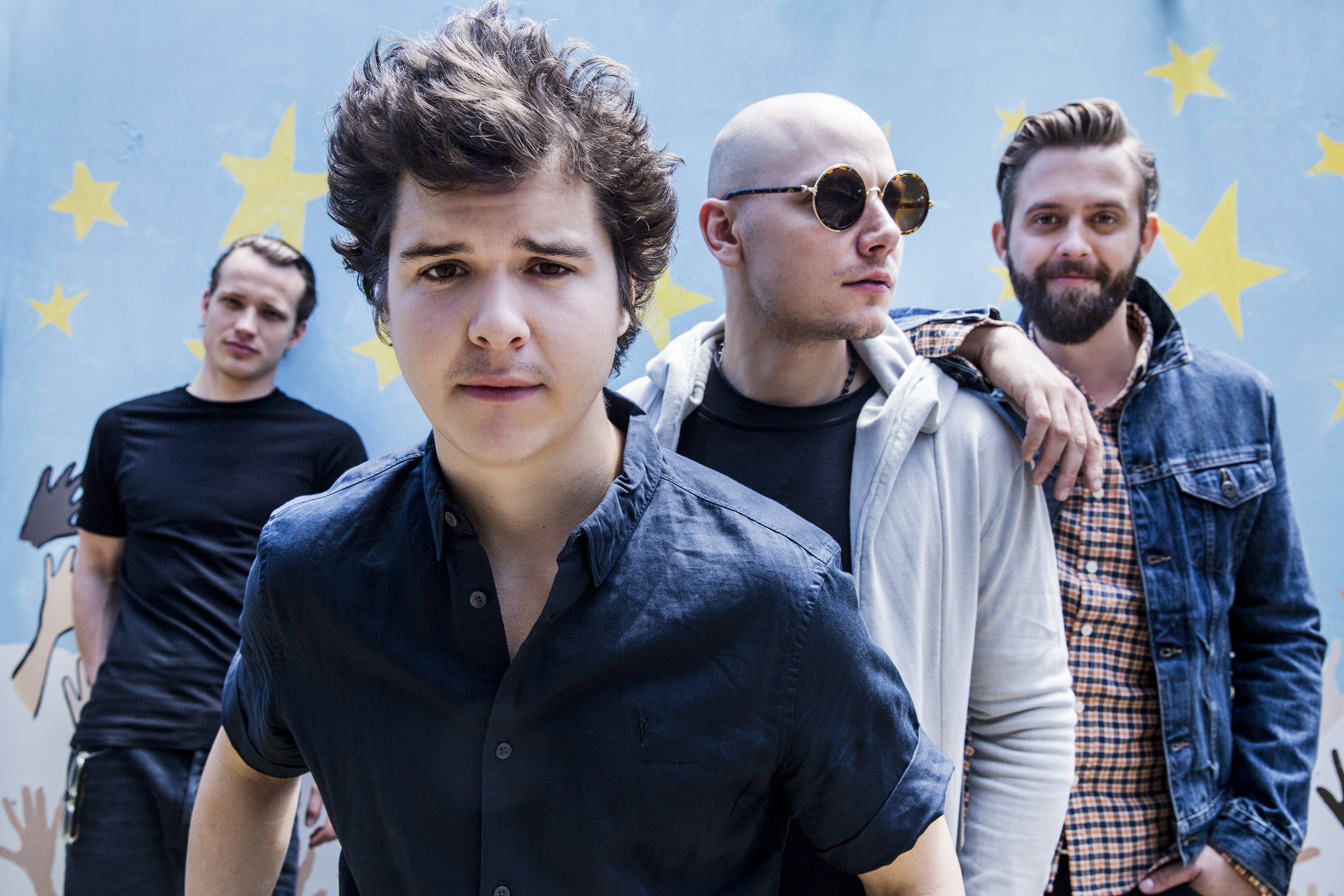
Danish band Lukas Graham reached number one in February 2016 with "7 Years", which became the first UK chart-topper by an act from Denmark since Aqua's "Turn Back Time" back in 1998.

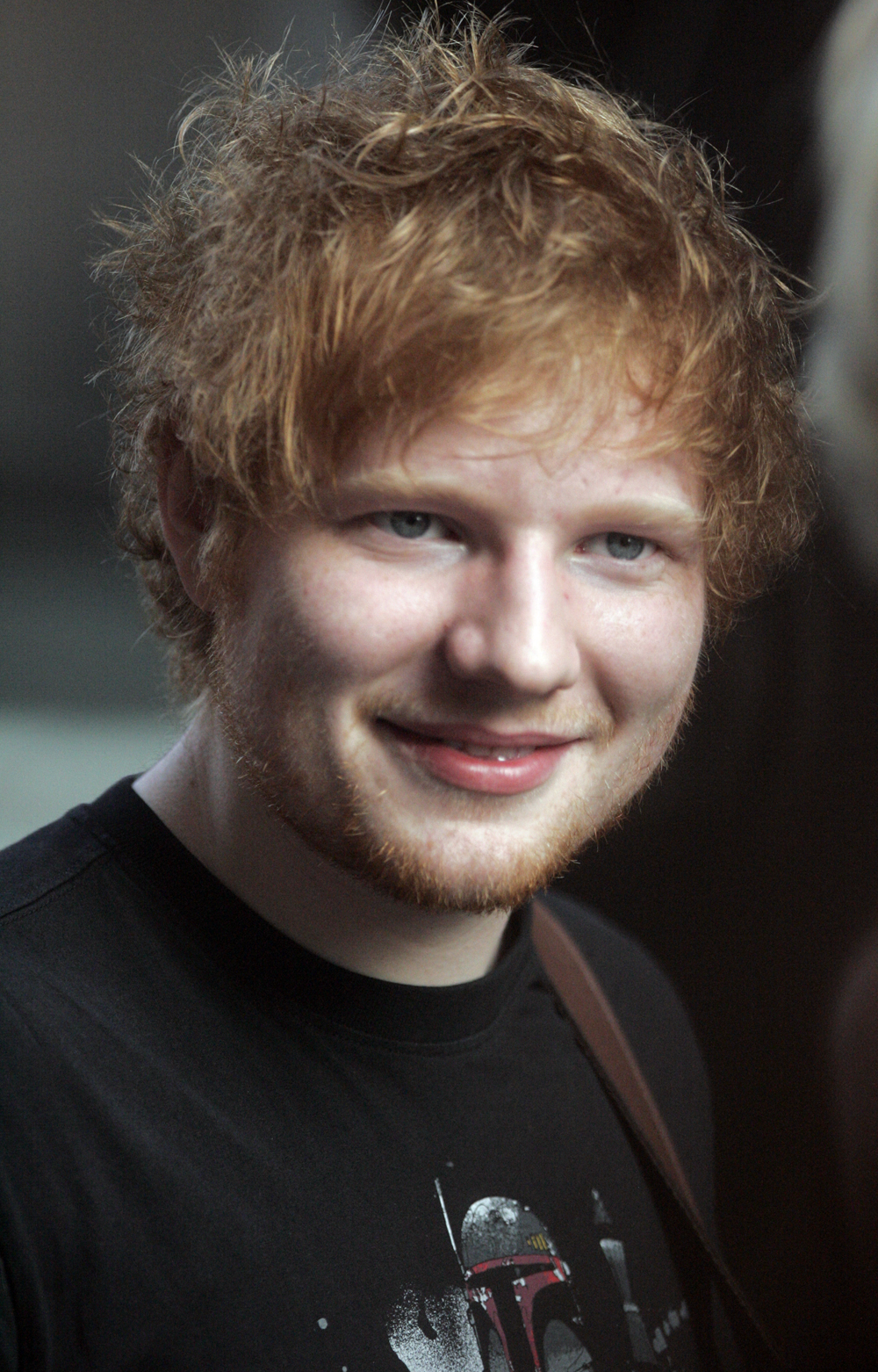
Ed Sheeran scored eight number ones throughout the decade, including a 14-week run at the top of the chart in 2017 with "Shape of You", the best-selling single of that year. His other number ones included "Perfect", which spent 6 weeks at number one in 2017 and 2018 and earned Sheeran his first Christmas number one, and "I Don't Care", which held the top spot for 8 weeks in 2019.

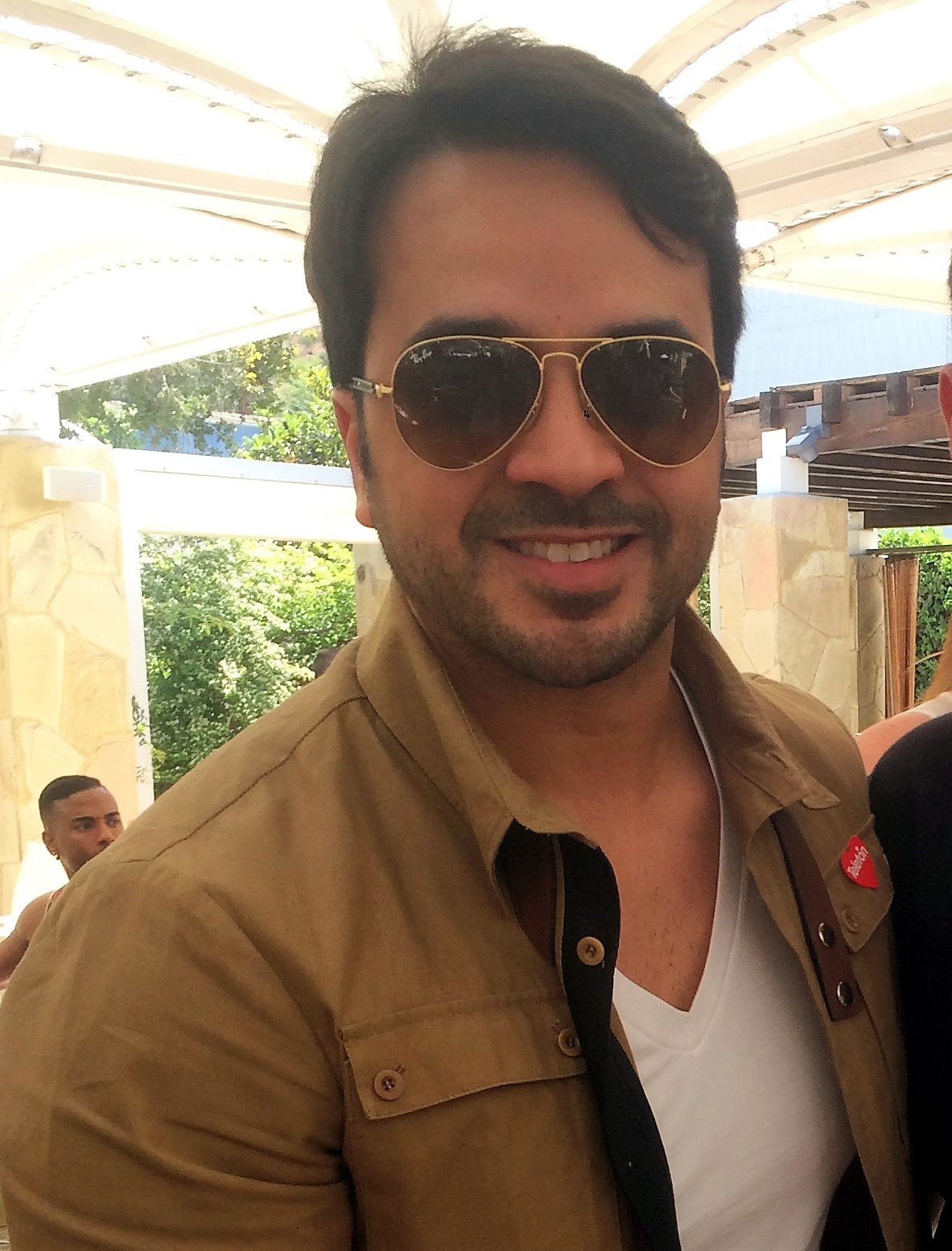
Luis Fonsi spent eleven non-consecutive weeks at number one in 2017 with "Despacito", the longest-running foreign language number one in UK chart history.

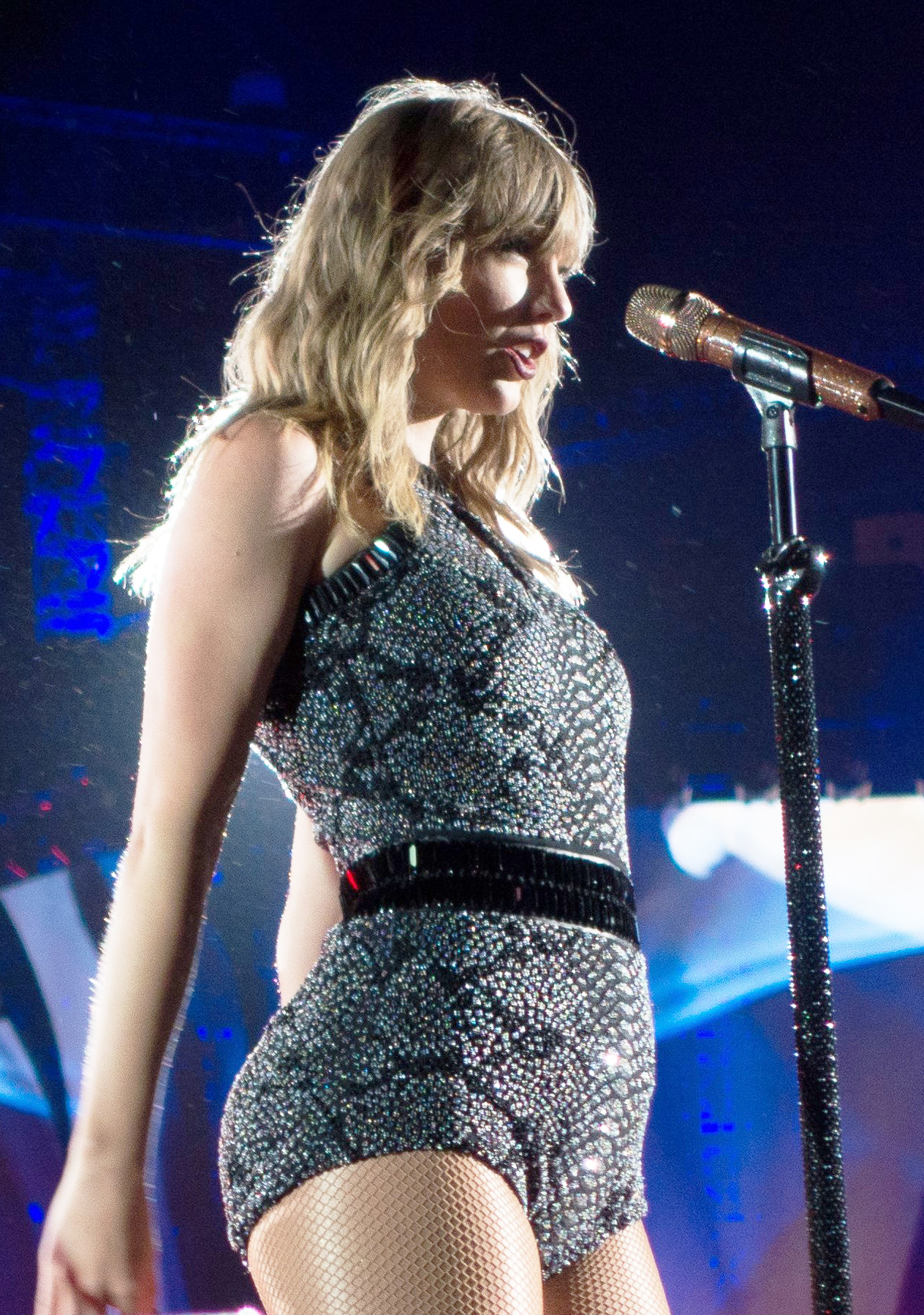
Taylor Swift earned her first ever UK number one single with her hit song "Look What You Made Me Do" in 2017, which topped the charts for two consecutive weeks.

Key
No.	nth single to top the UK singles chart
re	Return of a single to number one
†	Best-selling single of the year (Note: In 2010, the best-selling single of the year was "Love the Way You Lie" by Eminem featuring Rihanna, which entered the chart on 27 June and peaked at number two.)
‡	Best-selling single of the decade

No.	Artist (Note: The artist, single, date of reaching number one and number of weeks at number one are those given by the Official Charts Company.)	Single	Record label (Note: The record labels are those given by the OCC.)	Week ending date	Weeks at number one
2010
1118	Joe McElderry	"The Climb"	Syco	2 January 2010	1
re	Lady Gaga	"Bad Romance"	Interscope	9 January 2010	1
1119	Iyaz	"Replay"	Reprise	16 January 2010	2
1120	Owl City	"Fireflies"	Island	30 January 2010	3
1121	Helping Haiti	"Everybody Hurts"	Syco	20 February 2010	2
1122	Jason Derulo	"In My Head"	Warner Bros.	6 March 2010	1
1123	Tinie Tempah	"Pass Out"	Parlophone	13 March 2010	2
1124	Lady Gaga featuring Beyoncé	"Telephone"	Interscope	27 March 2010	2
1125	Scouting for Girls	"This Ain't a Love Song"	Epic	10 April 2010	2
1126	Usher featuring will.i.am	"OMG"	LaFace	24 April 2010	1
1127	Diana Vickers	"Once"	RCA	1 May 2010	1
1128	Roll Deep	"Good Times"	Relentless, Virgin	8 May 2010	3
1129	B.o.B featuring Bruno Mars	"Nothin' on You"	Atlantic	29 May 2010	1
1130	Dizzee Rascal	"Dirtee Disco"	Dirtee Stank	5 June 2010	1
1131	David Guetta and Chris Willis featuring Fergie and LMFAO	"Gettin' Over You"	Positiva, Virgin	12 June 2010	1
1132	Shout for England featuring Dizzee Rascal and James Corden	"Shout"	Syco	19 June 2010	2
1133	Katy Perry featuring Snoop Dogg	"California Gurls"	Virgin	3 July 2010	2
1134	JLS	"The Club Is Alive"	Epic	17 July 2010	1
1135	B.o.B featuring Hayley Williams	"Airplanes"	Atlantic	24 July 2010	1
1136	Yolanda Be Cool and DCUP	"We No Speak Americano"	AATW, Sweat It Out	31 July 2010	1
1137	The Wanted	"All Time Low"	Geffen	7 August 2010	1
1138	Ne-Yo	"Beautiful Monster"	Def Jam	14 August 2010	1
1139	Flo Rida featuring David Guetta	"Club Can't Handle Me"	Atlantic	21 August 2010	1
1140	Roll Deep	"Green Light"	Relentless, Virgin	28 August 2010	1
1141	Taio Cruz	"Dynamite"	4th and Broadway	4 September 2010	1
1142	Olly Murs	"Please Don't Let Me Go"	Epic, Syco	11 September 2010	1
1143	Alexandra Burke featuring Laza Morgan	"Start Without You"	Syco	18 September 2010	2
1144	Bruno Mars	"Just the Way You Are (Amazing)"	Elektra	2 October 2010	1
1145	Tinie Tempah featuring Eric Turner	"Written in the Stars"	Parlophone	9 October 2010	1
1146	CeeLo Green	"Forget You"	Warner Bros.	16 October 2010	2
re	Bruno Mars	"Just the Way You Are (Amazing)"	Elektra	30 October 2010	1
1147	Cheryl Cole	"Promise This"	Polydor	6 November 2010	1
1148	Rihanna	"Only Girl (In the World)"	Def Jam	13 November 2010	2
1149	JLS	"Love You More"	Epic	27 November 2010	1
1150	The X Factor Finalists 2010	"Heroes"	Syco	4 December 2010	2
1151	The Black Eyed Peas	"The Time (Dirty Bit)"	Interscope	18 December 2010	1
1152	Matt Cardle	"When We Collide"	Syco	25 December 2010	3
2011
1153	Rihanna featuring Drake	"What's My Name?"	Def Jam	15 January 2011	1
1154	Bruno Mars	"Grenade"	Elektra	22 January 2011	2
1155	Kesha	"We R Who We R"	RCA	5 February 2011	1
1156	Jessie J featuring B.o.B	"Price Tag"	Island, Lava	12 February 2011	2
1157	Adele	"Someone like You" †	XL	26 February 2011	4
1158	Nicole Scherzinger	"Don't Hold Your Breath"	Interscope	26 March 2011	1
re	Adele	"Someone like You" †	XL	2 April 2011	1
1159	Jennifer Lopez featuring Pitbull	"On the Floor"	Def Jam	9 April 2011	2
1160	LMFAO featuring Lauren Bennett and GoonRock	"Party Rock Anthem"	Interscope	23 April 2011	4
1161	Bruno Mars	"The Lazy Song"	Elektra	21 May 2011	1
1162	Pitbull featuring Ne-Yo, Afrojack and Nayer	"Give Me Everything"	J	28 May 2011	3
1163	Example	"Changed the Way You Kiss Me"	Ministry of Sound	18 June 2011	2
1164	Jason Derulo	"Don't Wanna Go Home"	Warner Bros.	2 July 2011	2
1165	DJ Fresh featuring Sian Evans	"Louder"	Ministry of Sound	16 July 2011	1
1166	The Wanted	"Glad You Came"	Global Talent	23 July 2011	2
1167	JLS featuring Dev	"She Makes Me Wanna"	Epic	6 August 2011	1
1168	Cher Lloyd	"Swagger Jagger"	Syco	13 August 2011	1
1169	Nero	"Promises"	MTA	20 August 2011	1
1170	Wretch 32 featuring Josh Kumra	"Don't Go"	Levels, Ministry of Sound	27 August 2011	1
1171	Olly Murs featuring Rizzle Kicks	"Heart Skips a Beat"	Epic, Syco	3 September 2011	1
1172	Example	"Stay Awake"	Ministry of Sound	10 September 2011	1
1173	Pixie Lott	"All About Tonight"	Mercury	17 September 2011	1
1174	One Direction	"What Makes You Beautiful"	Syco	24 September 2011	1
1175	Dappy	"No Regrets"	AATW, Takeover, Island	1 October 2011	1
1176	Sak Noel	"Loca People"	3 Beat, AATW	8 October 2011	1
1177	Rihanna featuring Calvin Harris	"We Found Love"	Def Jam	15 October 2011	3
1178	Professor Green featuring Emeli Sandé	"Read All About It"	Virgin	5 November 2011	2
re	Rihanna featuring Calvin Harris	"We Found Love"	Def Jam	19 November 2011	3
1179	The X Factor Finalists 2011 featuring JLS and One Direction	"Wishing on a Star"	Syco	10 December 2011	1
1180	Olly Murs	"Dance with Me Tonight"	Epic	17 December 2011	1
1181	Little Mix	"Cannonball"	Syco	24 December 2011	1
1182	Military Wives with Gareth Malone	"Wherever You Are"	Decca	31 December 2011	1
2012
1183	Coldplay	"Paradise"	Parlophone	7 January 2012	1
1184	Flo Rida	"Good Feeling"	Atlantic	14 January 2012	1
1185	Jessie J	"Domino"	Island, Lava	21 January 2012	2
1186	Cover Drive	"Twilight"	Global Talent	4 February 2012	1
1187	David Guetta featuring Sia	"Titanium"	Positiva, Virgin	11 February 2012	1
1188	Gotye featuring Kimbra	"Somebody That I Used to Know" †	Island	18 February 2012	1
1189	DJ Fresh featuring Rita Ora	"Hot Right Now"	Ministry of Sound	25 February 2012	1
re	Gotye featuring Kimbra	"Somebody That I Used to Know" †	Island	3 March 2012	4
1190	Katy Perry	"Part of Me"	Virgin	31 March 2012	1
1191	Chris Brown	"Turn Up the Music"	RCA	7 April 2012	1
1192	Carly Rae Jepsen	"Call Me Maybe"	Interscope	14 April 2012	4
1193	Tulisa	"Young"	AATW, Island	12 May 2012	1
1194	Rita Ora featuring Tinie Tempah	"RIP"	Columbia, Roc Nation	19 May 2012	2
1195	Fun featuring Janelle Monáe	"We Are Young"	Atlantic, Fueled by Ramen	2 June 2012	1
1196	Rudimental featuring John Newman	"Feel the Love"	Asylum, Black Butter	9 June 2012	1
1197	Gary Barlow and the Commonwealth Band	"Sing"	Decca	16 June 2012	1
1198	Cheryl	"Call My Name"	Polydor	23 June 2012	1
1199	Maroon 5 featuring Wiz Khalifa	"Payphone"	A&M/Octone	30 June 2012	1
1200	will.i.am featuring Eva Simons	"This Is Love"	Interscope	7 July 2012	1
re	Maroon 5 featuring Wiz Khalifa	"Payphone"	A&M/Octone	14 July 2012	1
1201	Florence and the Machine	"Spectrum (Say My Name)"	Island	21 July 2012	3
1202	Wiley featuring Ms D	"Heatwave"	One More Tune, Warner Bros.	11 August 2012	2
1203	Rita Ora	"How We Do (Party)"	Roc Nation, Columbia	25 August 2012	1
1204	Sam and the Womp	"Bom Bom"	One More Tune	1 September 2012	1
1205	Little Mix	"Wings"	Syco	8 September 2012	1
1206	Ne-Yo	"Let Me Love You (Until You Learn to Love Yourself)"	Def Jam	15 September 2012	1
1207	The Script featuring will.i.am	"Hall of Fame"	Epic, Phonogenic	22 September 2012	2
1208	Psy	"Gangnam Style"	Island	6 October 2012	1
1209	Rihanna	"Diamonds"	Def Jam	13 October 2012	1
1210	Swedish House Mafia featuring John Martin	"Don't You Worry Child"	Virgin	20 October 2012	1
1211	Calvin Harris featuring Florence Welch	"Sweet Nothing"	Columbia, Fly Eye	27 October 2012	1
1212	Labrinth featuring Emeli Sandé	"Beneath Your Beautiful"	Syco	3 November 2012	1
1213	Robbie Williams	"Candy"	Island	10 November 2012	2
1214	One Direction	"Little Things"	Syco	24 November 2012	1
1215	Olly Murs featuring Flo Rida	"Troublemaker"	Epic	1 December 2012	2
1216	Gabrielle Aplin	"The Power of Love"	Parlophone	15 December 2012	1
1217	James Arthur	"Impossible"	Syco	22 December 2012	1
1218	The Justice Collective	"He Ain't Heavy, He's My Brother"	Metropolis	29 December 2012	1
2013
re	James Arthur	"Impossible"	Syco	5 January 2013	2
1219	will.i.am featuring Britney Spears	"Scream & Shout"	Interscope	19 January 2013	2
1220	Bingo Players featuring Far East Movement	"Get Up (Rattle)"	Ministry of Sound	2 February 2013	2
1221	Macklemore & Ryan Lewis featuring Wanz	"Thrift Shop"	Macklemore	16 February 2013	1
1222	Avicii vs. Nicky Romero	"I Could Be the One"	Positiva, Virgin	23 February 2013	1
1223	One Direction	"One Way or Another (Teenage Kicks)"	Syco	2 March 2013	1
1224	Justin Timberlake	"Mirrors"	RCA	9 March 2013	3
1225	The Saturdays featuring Sean Paul	"What About Us"	Polydor	30 March 2013	1
1226	PJ & Duncan	"Let's Get Ready to Rhumble"	Sony BMG	6 April 2013	1
1227	Duke Dumont featuring A*M*E	"Need U (100%)"	Ministry of Sound	13 April 2013	2
1228	Rudimental featuring Ella Eyre	"Waiting All Night"	Asylum, Black Butter	27 April 2013	1
1229	Daft Punk featuring Pharrell Williams	"Get Lucky"	Columbia	4 May 2013	4
1230	Naughty Boy featuring Sam Smith	"La La La"	Virgin	1 June 2013	1
1231	Robin Thicke featuring T.I. and Pharrell	"Blurred Lines" †	Interscope	8 June 2013	4
1232	Icona Pop featuring Charli XCX	"I Love It"	Atlantic	6 July 2013	1
1233	John Newman	"Love Me Again"	Island	13 July 2013	1
re	Robin Thicke featuring T.I. and Pharrell	"Blurred Lines" †	Interscope	20 July 2013	1
1234	Avicii	"Wake Me Up"	Positiva, Virgin	27 July 2013	3
1235	Miley Cyrus	"We Can't Stop"	RCA	17 August 2013	1
1236	Ellie Goulding	"Burn"	Polydor	24 August 2013	3
1237	Katy Perry	"Roar"	Virgin	14 September 2013	2
1238	Jason Derulo featuring 2 Chainz	"Talk Dirty"	Warner Bros., Def Jam	28 September 2013	2
1239	OneRepublic	"Counting Stars"	Interscope	12 October 2013	1
1240	Miley Cyrus	"Wrecking Ball"	RCA	19 October 2013	1
re	OneRepublic	"Counting Stars"	Interscope	26 October 2013	1
1241	Lorde	"Royals"	Republic	2 November 2013	1
1242	Eminem featuring Rihanna	"The Monster"	Interscope	9 November 2013	1
1243	Storm Queen	"Look Right Through"	Ministry of Sound	16 November 2013	1
1244	Martin Garrix	"Animals"	Spinnin'	23 November 2013	1
1245	Lily Allen	"Somewhere Only We Know"	Warner Bros.	30 November 2013	1
1246	Calvin Harris and Alesso featuring Hurts	"Under Control"	Sony Music	7 December 2013	1
re	Lily Allen	"Somewhere Only We Know"	Warner Bros.	14 December 2013	2
1247	Sam Bailey	"Skyscraper"	Syco	28 December 2013	1
2014
1248	Pharrell Williams	"Happy" †	Columbia	4 January 2014	1
1249	Pitbull featuring Kesha	"Timber"	RCA	11 January 2014	1
re	Pharrell Williams	"Happy" †	Columbia	18 January 2014	2
1250	Clean Bandit featuring Jess Glynne	"Rather Be"	Atlantic	1 February 2014	4
1251	Sam Smith	"Money on My Mind"	Capitol	1 March 2014	1
re	Pharrell Williams	"Happy" †	Columbia	8 March 2014	1
1252	Route 94 featuring Jess Glynne	"My Love"	Rinse	15 March 2014	1
1253	Dvbbs and Borgeous featuring Tinie Tempah	"Tsunami (Jump)"	Spinnin'	22 March 2014	1
1254	Duke Dumont featuring Jax Jones	"I Got U"	Virgin EMI	29 March 2014	1
1255	5 Seconds of Summer	"She Looks So Perfect"	Capitol	5 April 2014	1
1256	Aloe Blacc	"The Man"	Interscope	12 April 2014	1
1257	Sigma	"Nobody to Love"	3Beat	19 April 2014	1
1258	Kiesza	"Hideaway"	Lokal Legend	26 April 2014	1
1259	Mr Probz	"Waves"	Epic	3 May 2014	1
1260	Calvin Harris	"Summer"	Columbia	10 May 2014	1
re	Mr Probz	"Waves"	Epic	17 May 2014	1
1261	Rita Ora	"I Will Never Let You Down"	Columbia	24 May 2014	1
1262	Sam Smith	"Stay with Me"	Capitol	31 May 2014	1
1263	Secondcity	"I Wanna Feel"	Ministry of Sound	7 June 2014	1
1264	Ed Sheeran	"Sing"	Atlantic	14 June 2014	1
1265	Ella Henderson	"Ghost"	Syco	21 June 2014	2
1266	Oliver Heldens and Becky Hill	"Gecko (Overdrive)"	Parlophone	5 July 2014	1
1267	Ariana Grande featuring Iggy Azalea	"Problem"	Republic	12 July 2014	1
1268	will.i.am featuring Cody Wise	"It's My Birthday"	Interscope	19 July 2014	1
1269	Rixton	"Me and My Broken Heart"	Interscope	26 July 2014	1
1270	Cheryl featuring Tinie Tempah	"Crazy Stupid Love"	Polydor	2 August 2014	1
1271	Magic!	"Rude"	RCA	9 August 2014	1
1272	Nico & Vinz	"Am I Wrong"	EMI, Warner Bros.	16 August 2014	2
1273	David Guetta featuring Sam Martin	"Lovers on the Sun"	Parlophone	30 August 2014	1
1274	Lilly Wood and Robin Schulz	"Prayer in C"	Atlantic/Warner Music	6 September 2014	2
1275	Calvin Harris featuring John Newman	"Blame"	Columbia	20 September 2014	1
1276	Sigma featuring Paloma Faith	"Changing"	3Beat	27 September 2014	1
1277	Jessie J, Ariana Grande and Nicki Minaj	"Bang Bang"	Republic	4 October 2014	1
1278	Meghan Trainor	"All About That Bass"	Epic	11 October 2014	4
1279	Ed Sheeran	"Thinking Out Loud"	Atlantic	8 November 2014	1
1280	Cheryl	"I Don't Care"	Polydor	15 November 2014	1
1281	Gareth Malone's All Star Choir	"Wake Me Up"	Decca	22 November 2014	1
1282	Band Aid 30	"Do They Know It's Christmas?"	Virgin EMI, Universal Music	29 November 2014	1
1283	Take That	"These Days"	Polydor	6 December 2014	1
re	Ed Sheeran	"Thinking Out Loud"	Atlantic	13 December 2014	1
1284	Mark Ronson featuring Bruno Mars	"Uptown Funk"	Sony	20 December 2014	1
1285	Ben Haenow	"Something I Need"	Syco	27 December 2014	1
2015
re	Mark Ronson featuring Bruno Mars	"Uptown Funk" †	Sony	3 January 2015	6
1286	Ellie Goulding	"Love Me like You Do"	Polydor	14 February 2015	4
1287	Years & Years	"King"	Polydor	14 March 2015	1
1288	Sam Smith featuring John Legend	"Lay Me Down"	Capitol	21 March 2015	2
1289	Jess Glynne	"Hold My Hand"	East West Records/Warner Music	4 April 2015	3
1290	Wiz Khalifa featuring Charlie Puth	"See You Again"	Atlantic	25 April 2015	2
1291	Omi	"Cheerleader"	Oufah	9 May 2015	4
1292	Jason Derulo	"Want to Want Me"	Warner Bros.	6 June 2015	4
1293	Tinie Tempah featuring Jess Glynne	"Not Letting Go"	Parlophone	4 July 2015	1
1294	Lost Frequencies	"Are You with Me"	AATW	9 July 2015	1
1295	David Zowie	"House Every Weekend"	Positiva	16 July 2015	1
1296	Little Mix	"Black Magic"	Syco	23 July 2015	3
1297	One Direction	"Drag Me Down"	Syco	13 August 2015	1
1298	Charlie Puth featuring Meghan Trainor	"Marvin Gaye"	Atlantic	20 August 2015	1
1299	Jess Glynne	"Don't Be So Hard on Yourself"	Atlantic/Warner Music	27 August 2015	1
1300	Rachel Platten	"Fight Song"	Columbia	3 September 2015	1
1301	Justin Bieber	"What Do You Mean?"	Def Jam	10 September 2015	1
1302	Sigala	"Easy Love"	Ministry of Sound	17 September 2015	1
re	Justin Bieber	"What Do You Mean?"	Def Jam	24 September 2015	2
1303	Sam Smith	"Writing's on the Wall"	Capitol	8 October 2015	1
re	Justin Bieber	"What Do You Mean?"	Def Jam	15 October 2015	2
1304	KDA featuring Tinie Tempah and Katy B	"Turn the Music Louder (Rumble)"	Ministry of Sound	29 October 2015	1
1305	Adele	"Hello"	XL Recordings	5 November 2015	3
1306	Justin Bieber	"Sorry"	Def Jam	26 November 2015	2
1307	Justin Bieber	"Love Yourself"	Def Jam	10 December 2015	3
1308	The Lewisham and Greenwich NHS Choir	"A Bridge over You"	EmuBands	31 December 2015	1
2016
re	Justin Bieber	"Love Yourself"	Def Jam	7 January 2016	3
1309	Shawn Mendes	"Stitches"	Island	28 January 2016	2
1310	Zayn	"Pillowtalk"	RCA	11 February 2016	1
1311	Lukas Graham	"7 Years"	Warner Bros.	18 February 2016	5
1312	Mike Posner	"I Took a Pill in Ibiza"	Island	24 March 2016	4
1313	Drake featuring Wizkid and Kyla	"One Dance" †	Cash Money, Republic	21 April 2016	15
1314	Major Lazer featuring Justin Bieber and MØ	"Cold Water"	Because Music	4 August 2016	5
1315	The Chainsmokers featuring Halsey	"Closer"	Columbia	8 September 2016	4
1316	James Arthur	"Say You Won't Let Go"	Columbia	6 October 2016	3
1317	Little Mix	"Shout Out to My Ex"	Syco	27 October 2016	3
1318	Clean Bandit featuring Sean Paul and Anne-Marie	"Rockabye"	Atlantic/Warner Music	17 November 2016	9
2017
1319	Ed Sheeran	"Shape of You" ‡	Atlantic	19 January 2017	13
1320	Harry Styles	"Sign of the Times"	Columbia	20 April 2017	1
re	Ed Sheeran	"Shape of You" ‡	Atlantic	27 April 2017	1
1321	Clean Bandit featuring Zara Larsson	"Symphony"	Atlantic, Epic	4 May 2017	1
1322	DJ Khaled featuring Justin Bieber, Quavo, Chance the Rapper and Lil Wayne	"I'm the One"	We the Best, Epic	11 May 2017	1
1323	Luis Fonsi and Daddy Yankee featuring Justin Bieber	"Despacito"	Republic	18 May 2017	6
1324	Artists for Grenfell	"Bridge over Troubled Water"	Syco	29 June 2017	1
re	Luis Fonsi and Daddy Yankee featuring Justin Bieber	"Despacito"	Republic	6 July 2017	3
1325	DJ Khaled featuring Rihanna and Bryson Tiller	"Wild Thoughts"	We the Best, Epic	27 July 2017	1
re	Luis Fonsi and Daddy Yankee featuring Justin Bieber	"Despacito"	Republic	3 August 2017	2
1326	Calvin Harris featuring Pharrell Williams, Katy Perry and Big Sean	"Feels"	Sony	17 August 2017	1
1327	Dua Lipa	"New Rules"	Warner Bros.	24 August 2017	2
1328	Taylor Swift	"Look What You Made Me Do"	Big Machine	7 September 2017	2
1329	Sam Smith	"Too Good at Goodbyes"	Capitol	21 September 2017	3
1330	Post Malone featuring 21 Savage	"Rockstar"	Republic	12 October 2017	4
1331	Camila Cabello featuring Young Thug	"Havana"	Epic, Syco	9 November 2017	5
1332	Ed Sheeran	"Perfect"	Asylum, Atlantic	14 December 2017	6
2018
1333	Eminem featuring Ed Sheeran	"River"	Interscope	25 January 2018	1
1334	Drake	"God's Plan"	Cash Money, Republic	1 February 2018	9
1335	Rudimental featuring Jess Glynne, Macklemore and Dan Caplen	"These Days"	Asylum	5 April 2018	1
1336	Lil Dicky featuring Chris Brown	"Freaky Friday"	Dirty Burd	12 April 2018	1
1337	Drake	"Nice for What"	Cash Money, Republic	19 April 2018	1
1338	Calvin Harris and Dua Lipa	"One Kiss" †	Columbia/Warner Brothers^{[A]}	26 April 2018	8
1339	Jess Glynne	"I'll Be There"	Atlantic	21 June 2018	1
1340	Clean Bandit featuring Demi Lovato	"Solo"	Atlantic	28 June 2018	1
1341	George Ezra	"Shotgun"	Columbia	5 July 2018	2
re	Baddiel, Skinner and The Lightning Seeds	"Three Lions"	Epic	19 July 2018	1
1342	Drake	"In My Feelings"	Cash Money, Republic	26 July 2018	4
re	George Ezra	"Shotgun"	Columbia	23 August 2018	2
1343	Benny Blanco, Halsey and Khalid	"Eastside"	Interscope	6 September 2018	1
1344	Calvin Harris and Sam Smith	"Promises"	Columbia	13 September 2018	5
1345	Dave featuring Fredo	"Funky Friday"	Dave, Neighbourhood	18 October 2018	1
re	Calvin Harris and Sam Smith	"Promises"	Columbia	25 October 2018	1
1346	Lady Gaga and Bradley Cooper	"Shallow"	Interscope	1 November 2018	2
1347	Ariana Grande	"Thank U, Next"	Republic	15 November 2018	6
1348	LadBaby	"We Built This City"	Frtyfve	27 December 2018	1
2019
1349	Ava Max	"Sweet but Psycho"	Atlantic	3 January 2019	4
1350	Ariana Grande	"7 Rings"	Republic	31 January 2019	3
1351	Ariana Grande	"Break Up with Your Girlfriend, I'm Bored"	Republic	21 February 2019	1
re	Ariana Grande	"7 Rings"	Republic	28 February 2019	1
1352	Lewis Capaldi	"Someone You Loved" †	EMI	7 March 2019	7
1353	Lil Nas X	"Old Town Road"	Columbia	25 April 2019	2
1354	Stormzy	"Vossi Bop"	Merky	9 May 2019	2
1355	Ed Sheeran and Justin Bieber	"I Don't Care"	Asylum	23 May 2019	8
1356	Shawn Mendes and Camila Cabello	"Señorita"	EMI, Syco	18 July 2019	1
1357	Ed Sheeran featuring Khalid	"Beautiful People"	Asylum	25 July 2019	1
re	Shawn Mendes and Camila Cabello	"Señorita"	EMI, Syco	1 August 2019	5
1358	Ed Sheeran featuring Stormzy	"Take Me Back to London"	Asylum	5 September 2019	5
1359	Tones and I	"Dance Monkey"	Bad Batch	10 October 2019	11
1360	LadBaby	"I Love Sausage Rolls"	Frtyfve	26 December 2019	1

=== Artists with the most number ones ===
Nineteen artists all had at least four number-one singles during the 2010s. Calvin Harris and Ed Sheeran both had eight, more than anyone else.

Artist	Number ones	Songs	Notes
Calvin Harris	8	List: 1. "We Found Love" (2011); 2. "Sweet Nothing" (2012); 3. "Under Control" (2013); 4. "Summer" (2014); 5. "Blame" (2014); 6. "Feels" (2017); 7. "One Kiss" (2018); 8. "Promises" (2018)	Includes feature on "We Found Love"
Ed Sheeran	8	List: 1. "Sing" (2014); 2. "Thinking Out Loud" (2014); 3. "Shape of You" (2017); 4. "Perfect" (2017); 5. "River" (2018); 6. "I Don't Care" (2019); 7. "Beautiful People" (2019); 8. "Take Me Back to London" (2019)	Includes feature on "River"
Justin Bieber	7	List: 1. "What Do You Mean?" (2015); 2. "Sorry" (2015); 3. "Love Yourself" (2015); 4. "Cold Water" (2016); 5. "I'm the One" (2017); 6. "Despacito (Remix)" (2017); 7. "I Don't Care" (2019)	Includes feature on "Cold Water", "I'm the One" and "Despacito (Remix)"
Jess Glynne	7	List: 1. "Rather Be" (2014); 2. "My Love" (2014); 3. "Hold My Hand" (2015); 4. "Not Letting Go" (2015); 5. "Don't Be So Hard on Yourself" (2015); 6. "These Days" (2018); 7. "I'll Be There" (2018)	Includes feature on "Rather Be", "My Love", "Not Letting Go" and "These Days"
Sam Smith	7	List: 1. "La La La" (2013); 2. "Money on My Mind" (2014); 3. "Stay with Me" (2014); 4. "Lay Me Down" (2015); 5. "Writing's on the Wall" (2015); 6. "Too Good at Goodbyes" (2017); 7. "Promises" (2018)	Includes feature on "La La La" and "Promises"
Tinie Tempah	7	List: 1. "Pass Out" (2010); 2. "Written in the Stars" (2010); 3. "R.I.P." (2012); 4. "Tsunami (Jump)" (2013); 5. "Crazy Stupid Love" (2014); 6. "Not Letting Go" (2015); 7. "Turn the Music Louder (Rumble)" (2015)	Includes feature on "R.I.P.", "Tsunami (Jump)", "Crazy Stupid Love" and "Turn the Music Louder (Rumble)"
Rihanna	6	List: 1. "Only Girl (In the World)" (2010); 2. "What's My Name?" (2011); 3. "We Found Love" (2011); 4. "Diamonds" (2012); 5. "The Monster" (2013); 6. "Wild Thoughts" (2017)	Includes feature on "The Monster" and "Wild Thoughts"
Bruno Mars	5	List: 1. "Nothin' on You" (2010); 2. "Just the Way You Are (Amazing)" (2010); 3. "Grenade" (2011); 4. "The Lazy Song" (2011); 5. "Uptown Funk" (2014)	Includes feature on "Nothin' on You" and "Uptown Funk"
One Direction	5	List: 1. "What Makes You Beautiful" (2011); 2. "Wishing on a Star" (2011); 3. "Little Things" (2012); 4. "One Way or Another (Teenage Kicks)" (2013); 5. "Drag Me Down" (2015)	Includes feature on "Wishing on a Star"
Drake	5	List: 1. "What's My Name?" (2010); 2. "One Dance" (2016); 3. "God's Plan" (2018); 4. "Nice for What" (2018); 5. "In My Feelings" (2018)	Includes feature on "What's My Name?"
Ariana Grande	5	List: 1. "Problem" (2014); 2. "Bang Bang" (2014); 3. "Thank U, Next" (2018); 4. "7 Rings" (2019); 5. "Break Up with Your Girlfriend, I'm Bored" (2019)	—N/a
will.i.am	5	List: 1. "OMG" (2010); 2. "This Is Love" (2012); 3. "Hall of Fame" (2012); 4. "Scream & Shout" (2013); 5. "It's My Birthday" (2014)	Includes feature on "OMG" and "Hall of Fame"
Cheryl	4	List: 1. "Promise This" (2010); 2. "Call My Name" (2012); 3. "Crazy Stupid Love" (2014); 4. "I Don't Care" (2014)	—N/a
Clean Bandit	4	List: 1. "Rather Be" (2014); 2. "Rockabye" (2016); 3. "Symphony" (2017); 4. "Solo" (2018)	—N/a
Jason Derulo	4	List: 1. "In My Head" (2010); 2. "Don't Wanna Go Home" (2011); 3. "Talk Dirty" (2013); 4. "Want to Want Me" (2015)	—N/a
David Guetta	4	List: 1. "Gettin' Over You" (2010); 2. "Club Can't Handle Me" (2010); 3. "Titanium" (2011); 4. "Lovers on the Sun" (2015)	Includes feature on "Club Can't Handle Me"
JLS	4	List: 1. "The Club Is Alive" (2010); 2. "Love You More" (2010); 3. "She Makes Me Wanna" (2011); 4. "Wishing on a Star"(2011)	Includes feature on "Wishing on a Star"
Little Mix	4	List: 1. "Cannonball" (2011); 2. "Wings" (2012); 3. "Black Magic" (2015); 4. "Shout Out to My Ex" (2016)	—N/a
Olly Murs	4	List: 1. "Please Don't Let Me Go" (2010); 2. "Dance with Me Tonight" (2011); 3. "Heart Skips a Beat" (2011); 4. "Troublemaker" (2012)	—N/a
Rita Ora	4	List: 1. "Hot Right Now" (2012); 2. "R.I.P." (2012); 3. "How We Do (Party)" (2012); 4. "I Will Never Let You Down" (2014)	Includes feature on "Hot Right Now"
Katy Perry	4	List: 1. "California Gurls" (2010); 2. "Part of Me" (2012); 3. "Roar" (2013); 4. "Feels" (2017)	Includes feature on "Feels"
Pharrell Williams	4	List: 1. "Get Lucky" (2013); 2. "Blurred Lines" (2013); 3. "Happy" (2013); 4. "Feels" (2017)	Includes feature on "Get Lucky", "Blurred Lines" and "Feels"

=== Songs with the most weeks at number one ===
The following songs spent at least six weeks at number one during the 2010s.

Artist	Song	Weeks at number one
Drake featuring Kyla and Wizkid	"One Dance"	15
Ed Sheeran	"Shape of You"	14
Luis Fonsi and Daddy Yankee featuring Justin Bieber	"Despacito (Remix)"	11
Tones and I	"Dance Monkey"	11
Clean Bandit featuring Sean Paul and Anne-Marie	"Rockabye"	9
Drake	"God's Plan"	9
Calvin Harris and Dua Lipa	"One Kiss"	8
Ed Sheeran and Justin Bieber	"I Don't Care"	8
Mark Ronson featuring Bruno Mars	"Uptown Funk"	7
Lewis Capaldi	"Someone You Loved"	7
Rihanna featuring Calvin Harris	"We Found Love"	6
Justin Bieber	"Love Yourself"	6
Ed Sheeran	"Perfect"	6
Calvin Harris and Sam Smith	"Promises"	6
Ariana Grande	"Thank U, Next"	6
Shawn Mendes and Camila Cabello	"Señorita"	6

=== Artists with the most weeks at number one ===
The following artists have all spent a total of nine or more weeks at the number-one spot during the 2010s.

Artist	Weeks at number-one	Songs	Notes
Justin Bieber	38	List: 1. "What Do You Mean?" (5 weeks); 2. "Sorry" (2 weeks); 3. "Love Yourself" (6 weeks); 4. "Cold Water" (5 weeks); 5. "I'm the One" (1 week); 6. "Despacito (Remix)" (11 weeks); 7. "I Don't Care" (8 weeks)	Includes feature on "Cold Water", "I'm the One" and "Despacito (Remix)"
Ed Sheeran	38	List: 1. "Sing" (1 week); 2. "Thinking Out Loud" (2 weeks); 3. "Shape of You" (14 weeks); 4. "Perfect" (6 weeks); 5. "River" (1 week); 6. "I Don't Care" (8 weeks); 7. "Beautiful People" (1 week); 8. "Take Me Back to London" (5 weeks)	Includes feature on "River" (also provides uncredited vocals on "Love Yourself" and "Freaky Friday")
Drake	30	List: 1. "What's My Name?" (1 week); 2. "One Dance" (15 weeks); 3. "God's Plan" (9 weeks); 4. "Nice for What" (1 week); 5. "In My Feelings" (4 weeks)	Includes feature on "What's My Name?"
Calvin Harris	25	List: 1. "We Found Love" (6 weeks); 2. "Sweet Nothing" (1 week); 3. "Under Control" (1 week); 4. "Summer" (1 week); 5. "Blame" (1 week); 6. "Feels" (1 week); 7. "One Kiss" (8 weeks); 8. "Promises" (6 weeks)	Includes feature on "We Found Love"
Clean Bandit	15	List: 1. "Rather Be" (4 weeks); 2. "Rockabye" (9 weeks); 3. "Symphony" (1 week); 4. "Solo" (1 week)	—N/a
Wizkid	15	List: 1. "One Dance" (15 weeks)	Includes feature on "One Dance"
Kyla	15	List: 1. "One Dance" (15 weeks)	Includes feature on "One Dance"
Sam Smith	15	List: 1. "La La La" (1 week); 2. "Money on My Mind" (1 week); 3. "Stay with Me" (1 week); 4. "Lay Me Down" (2 weeks); 5. "Writing's on the Wall" (1 week); 6. "Too Good at Goodbyes" (3 weeks); 7. "Promises" (6 weeks)	Includes feature on "La La La"
Pharrell Williams	14	List: 1. "Get Lucky" (4 weeks); 2. "Blurred Lines" (5 weeks); 3. "Happy" (4 weeks); 4. "Feels" (1 week)	Includes feature on "Get Lucky", "Blurred Lines" and "Feels" (also provides uncredited vocals on "Sing")
Bruno Mars	13	List: 1. "Nothin' on You" (1 week); 2. "Just the Way You Are" (2 weeks); 3. "Grenade" (2 weeks); 4. "The Lazy Song" (1 week); 5. "Uptown Funk" (7 weeks)	Includes feature on "Nothin' on You" and "Uptown Funk"
Ariana Grande	13	List: 1. "Problem" (1 week); 2. "Bang Bang" (1 week); 3. "Thank U, Next" (6 weeks); 4. "7 Rings" (4 weeks); 5. "Break Up with Your Girlfriend, I'm Bored" (1 week)	—N/a
Jess Glynne	12	List: 1. "Rather Be" (4 weeks); 2. "My Love" (1 week); 3. "Hold My Hand" (3 weeks); 4. "Not Letting Go" (1 week); 5. "Don't Be So Hard on Yourself" (1 week); 6. "These Days" (1 week); 7. "I'll Be There" (1 week)	Includes feature on "Rather Be", "My Love", "Not Letting Go" and "These Days"
Rihanna	12	List: 1. "Only Girl (In the World)" (2 weeks); 2. "What's My Name?" (1 week); 3. "We Found Love" (6 weeks); 4. "Diamonds" (1 week); 5. "The Monster" (1 week); 6. "Wild Thoughts" (1 week)	Includes feature on "The Monster" and "Wild Thoughts"
Luis Fonsi	11	List: 1. "Despacito (Remix)" (11 weeks)	—N/a
Daddy Yankee	11	List: 1. "Despacito (Remix)" (11 weeks)	—N/a
Camila Cabello	11	List: 1. "Havana" (5 weeks); 2. "Señorita" (6 weeks)	—N/a
Tones and I	11	List: 1. "Dance Monkey" (11 weeks)	—N/a
Dua Lipa	10	List: 1. "New Rules" (2 weeks); 2. "One Kiss" (8 weeks)	Includes feature on "One Kiss"
Sean Paul	10	List: 1. "What About Us" (1 week); 2. "Rockabye" (9 weeks)	Includes feature on "What About Us" and "Rockabye"
Anne-Marie	9	List: 1. "Rockabye" (9 weeks)	Includes feature on "Rockabye"
Jason Derulo	9	List: 1. "In My Head" (1 week); 2. "Don't Wanna Go Home" (2 weeks); 3. "Talk Dirty" (2 weeks); 4. "Want to Want Me" (4 weeks)	—N/a
Tinie Tempah	9	List: 1. "Pass Out" (2 weeks); 2. "Written in the Stars" (1 week); 3. "R.I.P." (2 weeks); 4. "Tsunami (Jump)" (1 week); 5. "Crazy Stupid Love" (1 week); 6. "Not Letting Go" (1 week); 7. "Turn the Music Louder (Rumble)" (1 week)	Includes feature on "R.I.P.", "Tsunami (Jump)", "Crazy Stupid Love" and "Turn the Music Louder (Rumble)"

=== Record labels with the most weeks at number one ===
Fourteen record labels have spent ten or more weeks at the top of the UK singles chart during the 2010s.

Record label	Number ones	Weeks at number-one
Republic Records	12	58
Syco Music	22	40
Atlantic Records	17	47
Interscope Records	14	27
Def Jam Records	11	26
Island Records	16	24
Virgin Records	12	19
Columbia Records^{[A]}	10	18
Epic Records	11	17
Warner Bros. Records^{[A]}^{[B]}	9	25
Cash Money Records	2	16
Polydor Records	9	14
Ministry of Sound	10	13
RCA Records	8	10

== Million-selling and Platinum records ==
Since April 1973, the British Phonographic Industry has been classifying singles by the number of units shipped or by sales. The highest threshold is "Platinum record" and is currently awarded to singles that have shipped or sold over 600,000 units. (Note: The number of sales required to qualify for Platinum, Gold and Silver discs was dropped in 1989 from the former thresholds of Silver (250,000 units), Gold (500,000 units), and Platinum (1,000,000 units) to the current thresholds of Silver (200,000 units), Gold (400,000 units), and Platinum (600,000 units).) From July 2014, BPI certifications (along with the Official Singles Chart) include audio streaming at 100 streams equal to one unit; these are referred to as 'combined sales' or 'chart sales'. So for example, "All of Me" by John Legend was certified double Platinum (1,200,000 combined sales) in October 2014 and became a million-seller in January 2015.

For million selling records see List of million-selling singles in the United Kingdom

For Platinum singles see List of Platinum singles in the United Kingdom awarded since 2000

== See also ==
- List of UK Albums Chart number ones of the 2010s
- List of Official Subscription Plays Chart number-one songs of the 2010s

== Notes ==
- A. The Calvin Harris and Dua Lipa song "One Kiss" was jointly released by Sony Music and WMG as the record featured Columbia Records artist Harris and Dua Lipa, signed to WMG's Warner Brothers label.
- B. These totals do not include the instances when parent company Warner Music (WMG) is listed with group labels Atlantic or East West Records.
