= Heart Over Mind (Alan Walker song) =

2023 single by Alan Walker and Daya

Single by Alan Walker and Daya

from the album Walkerworld
- Released: 9 November 2023
- Genre: Synth-pop; nu-disco; Eurodisco
- Label: MER Musikk
- Songwriters: Alan Walker; Big Fred; Carl Hovind; Gunnar Greve; Kristin Carpenter; Marcus Arnbekk; Slipmats
- Producers: Alan Walker; kasper

Alan Walker singles chronology
"Better Off (Alone, Pt. III)" (2023)	"Heart Over Mind" (2023)	"Fire!" (2023)

Daya singles chronology
"Downtown" (2023)	"Heart Over Mind" (2023)	"Don't Call" (2024)

Music video
- "Heart Over Mind" on YouTube

"Heart Over Mind" is a song by Norwegian DJ Alan Walker and American singer Daya. It was released on 9 November 2023, through MER. The song reached number 1 on the Russian Airplay Charts and appears on Walker's fourth studio album, Walkerworld (2023).

== Background ==
Walker says of the song: "Over the past few weeks I have felt so much joy, unity, and compassion from our small community. Since I published 'Walkerworld' you have showered me with kind words and wonderful theories about what is to come. Thus, I am glad to surprise you in return. The single "Heart Over Mind" features vocalist Daya and also includes a brand new music video that takes us back to the story of World of Walker."

== Critical reception ==
Jason Lipshutz of Billboard said, "Walker brings some post-chorus fireworks with laser-beam synths, Daya controls the collaboration, her vulnerability in each verse blossoming into the siren cry of the chorus".

== Music video ==
The music video for the song was directed by Mads Neset and has over 10 million views on YouTube.

Director Neset said of the music video, "Alan is very aware of this worldview and has to follow many characters, timelines, and various established themes, which is most enjoyable. It's like stepping into a very established IP and staying true to it. I tried to bring the video to life within the world that Alan created, but at the same time to have an underlying theme that I think we can all relate to a little bit in our daily lives," he said.

== Charts ==
=== Weekly charts ===
Weekly chart performance for "Heart Over Mind"
Chart (2023–2024)	Peak position
Belarus Airplay (TopHit)	1
CIS Airplay (TopHit)	3
Estonia Airplay (TopHit)	36
Finland Airplay (Radiosoittolista)	58
Kazakhstan Airplay (TopHit)	1
Moldova Airplay (TopHit)	36
Poland (Polish Airplay Top 100)	4
Russia Airplay (TopHit)	1
Ukraine Airplay (TopHit)	56
US Hot Dance/Electronic Songs (Billboard)	35

=== Monthly charts ===
Monthly chart performance for "Heart Over Mind"
Chart (2024)	Peak position
Belarus Airplay (TopHit)	1
CIS Airplay (TopHit)	3
Estonia Airplay (TopHit)	63
Kazakhstan Airplay (TopHit)	1
Moldova Airplay (TopHit)	70
Russia Airplay (TopHit)	1
Ukraine Airplay (TopHit)	66

=== Year-end charts ===
2024 year-end chart performance for "Heart Over Mind"
Chart (2024)	Peak position
Belarus Airplay (TopHit)	1
CIS Airplay (TopHit)	16
Kazakhstan Airplay (TopHit)	5
Poland (Polish Airplay Top 100)	47
Russia Airplay (TopHit)	2

2025 year-end chart performance for "Heart Over Mind"
Chart (2025)	Peak position
Belarus Airplay (TopHit)	55
