= Kaadhalan (soundtrack) =

- CD Front

Soundtrack album by A. R. Rahman
- Released: June 1994
- Recorded: 1994
- Studios: Panchathan Record Inn; Chennai, India
- Genre: Feature film soundtrack
- Length: 34:50
- Labels: T-Series; Pyramid
- Producer: A. R. Rahman

A. R. Rahman chronology
May Madham (1994)	Kaadhalan (1994)	Pavithra (1994)

Kaadhalan (transl. Loverboy; pronounced [kaːdalan]) is the soundtrack to the 1994 Tamil film of the same name, directed by Shankar. The soundtrack, features 9 songs composed by A. R. Rahman and lyrics penned by Vaali, Vairamuthu, Shankar and Thirikudarasappa Kavirayar. The Choreographers were Sundaram – Mugur Sundar and Raju Sundaram. The Hindi version, Humse Hai Muqabala, sold 2.5 million soundtrack album units in India.

== Background ==
For the film's soundtrack and score, Shankar renewed his association with A. R. Rahman, after previously collaborating with him in Gentleman (1993). Rahman experimented new styles for the film's music, with "Petta Rap" written by Shankar (in his only stint as a lyricist) featured lyrics in Madras Bashai and written in a rap-like style, interspersing Tamil and English words. Although composed in a folk style, Rahman further used keyboards and synthesizers. Suresh Peters, the rapper of the song, revealed that he and Rahman earlier tried a rap song for May Maadham, but the song was scrapped as Rahman felt it did not fit the score, until he decided to resurrect the idea for Kaadhalan.

P. Unnikrishnan made his playback singing debut with the song "Ennavale Ennavale" which is set in Kedaram raga. The song emerged as the breakthrough for the singer. During the recording of the song "Mukkabla", Rahman wanted Mano's voice to sound like R. D. Burman's as a means to distance him from S. P. Balasubrahmanyam, to whom he was frequently compared.

Though not a part of the cast in the film, actress Urvashi recalled in a 2025 interview on how Vaali wrote the song "Urvasi Urvasi" based on her name; this was due to her own disagreement with the lyricist on recording a song for Magalir Mattum (1994). She added: "When I heard it and saw Prabhu Deva’s dance, it was quite different from the ones typical of that era. When I asked him if they had written the song mocking me, he said no and assured me that it was penned in good faith."

== Music videos ==
Prabhu Deva's father Mugur Sundar and his brother Raju Sundaram choreographed the songs. "Urvasi Urvasi" was filmed at various landmarks across Madras (now Chennai), with art director Thota Tharani specially created a glass bus for the song. The song "Ennavale" was filmed at Kulu Manali. "Muqabla" was shot at Rajahmundry. Prior to the shoot of the two songs, Prabhu Deva tore a ligament on the left leg while filming an action sequence. While he walked for a short sequence in "Ennavale", the song "Muqabla" required heavy movements and he could not move his left leg due to pain. This led to him dancing the entire song in right leg. He wore a crepe bandage in his left leg and shoes of different sizes—9 on the left and 10 on the right—and choreographed the song that way.

== Reception ==
Professional ratings
Review scores
Source	Rating
Planet Bollywood	4/4 stars

The soundtrack earned national acclaim for Rahman, with "Urvasi Urvasi", "Mukkabla" and "Ennavale" becoming chartbusters. Numerous versions of the song were created unofficially, which resulted in the song achieving a distinction of most plagiarised versions of an original song by Limca Book of Records for Rahman. Owing to the success and immense national popularity of the song "Mukkabla", the soundtrack was subsequently dubbed in Hindi as Humse Hai Muqabala and in Telugu as Premikudu. Lyrics for this versions were written by P. K. Mishra and Rajasri respectively. The Hindi version of the soundtrack, Humse Hai Muqabala, sold 2.5 million units in India.

== Track listing ==
=== Tamil version (Kaadhalan) ===
No.	Title	Lyrics	Singer(s)	Length
1.	"Ennavale Adi Ennavale"	Vairamuthu	Unni Krishnan, Sujatha Mohan	5:11
2.	"Mukkala Mukkabla"	Vaali	Mano, Swarnalatha	5:23
3.	"Erani Kuradhani"	Vairamuthu	S. P. Balasubrahmanyam, S. Janaki	5:05
4.	"Kadhalikkum Pennin"	Vairamuthu	S. P. Balasubrahmanyam, Udit Narayan, S.P.B. Pallavi	4:48
5.	"Urvashi"	Vaali (poet)	A. R. Rahman, Suresh Peters, Shahul Hameed	5:39
6.	"Pettai Rap"	Vairamuthu, S. Shankar	Suresh Peters, Theni Kunjarammal, Shahul Hameed	4:23
7.	"Kollayile Thennai"	Vaali	P. Jayachandran	1:45
8.	"Kaatru Kuthirayile"	Vairamuthu	Sujatha Mohan	1:31
9.	"Indiraiyo Ival Sundariyo"	Thirikudarasappa Kavirayar	Sunanda, Minmini	1:02

=== Hindi version (Humse Hai Muqabala) ===
All lyrics are written by P. K. Mishra.

No.	Title	Singer(s)	Length
1.	"Muqaala Muqabla"	Mano, Swarnalatha	5:23
2.	"Sun Ri Sakhi"	Hariharan, Sujatha Mohan	5:11
3.	"Sagar Se Milne"	Sunandha, Minmini	1:02
4.	"Patti Rap"	Suresh Peters, Noel James, Shankar Mahadevan	4:23
5.	"Gopala Gopala"	S. P. Balasubrahmanyam, S. Janaki	5:05
6.	"Premika Ne Pyar Se"	S. P. Balasubrahmanyam, Udit Narayan, S. P. Pallavi	4:48
7.	"Maine Bheja Hai Sandesh"	Sujatha Mohan	1:31
8.	"Urvashi Urvashi"	A. R. Rahman, Shankar Mahadevan, Noel James	5:39
9.	"Phoolon Jaisi Pyari"	S. P. Balasubrahmanyam	1:45

=== Telugu version (Premikudu) ===
All lyrics are written by Rajasri

No.	Title	Singer(s)	Length
1.	"Urvasi"	A. R. Rahman, Suresh Peters, Shahul Hameed	5:39
2.	"Peta Rap"	Suresh Peters, Shahul Hameed, Theni Kunjaramma	4:23
3.	"Errani Kurrathani"	S. P. Balasubrahmanyam, S. Janaki	5:05
4.	"Andhamaina Premarani"	S. P. Balasubrahmanyam, Udit Narayan, S. P. Pallavi	4:48
5.	"Oh Cheliya"	P. Unnikrishnan, Sujatha Mohan	5:11
6.	"Mukkala Mukabula"	Mano, Swarnalatha	5:23
7.	"Gaali Taragalapai"	Sujatha Mohan	1:31
8.	"Alala Vale Vaana Varada Vale"	Sunandha, Minmini	1:02
9.	"Muttukunte Kandipoye"	P Jayachandran	1:43

== Accolades ==
Ceremony	Award	Work	Awardee	Ref.
42nd National Film Awards	Best Male Playback Singer	"Ennavale Adi Ennavale"	P. Unnikrishnan	

== Popular culture ==
In 2014, "Urvasi Urvasi" was sampled in the song "It's My Birthday" by American rapper will.i.am. In 2016, the song was featured in the film Lion. It was later recreated by Yo Yo Honey Singh. It was also re-used in online pharmacy application named pharmEasy's commercial. The song's lyrics also inspired the title of the 1996 film Take It Easy Urvasi. In 2017, Rahman released the unplugged version, which was written with help from his fans. Among its differences were more contemporary references such as the 2016 US Election and demonetisation.

In 2019, the song "Mukkabla" was subsequently remade by Tanishk Bagchi in Hindi for the film Street Dancer 3D (2020). "Petta Rap" was remixed in the 2024 film of the same name, also starring Prabhu Deva.
