= I'm So Excited (Anja Nissen song) =

2014 debut single by Anja Nissen featuring will.i.am and Cody Wise

Single by Anja Nissen featuring will.i.am and Cody Wise
- Released: 31 October 2014
- Genre: Synthpop
- Length: 3:39
- Songwriters: William Adams; Redfoo; Damien LeRoy; Lance Tolbert; Cody Wise; Lauren Evans
- Producers: will.i.am; DJ Ammo

Anja Nissen singles chronology
"I'm So Excited" (2014)	"Anyone Who Had a Heart" (2015)

will.i.am singles chronology
"Ew!" (2014)	"I'm So Excited" (2014)	"Boys & Girls" (2016)

Cody Wise singles chronology
"It's My Birthday" (2014)	"I'm So Excited" (2014)

"I'm So Excited" is a song by Australian singer Anja Nissen. It was written and produced by Redfoo and will.i.am. The song features vocals from will.i.am and Cody Wise. The song was released on 31 October 2014 and debuted at number 42 on the ARIA Singles Chart, selling 3,023 copies.

== Music video ==
On 24 October 2014 Nissen uploaded a six-second preview of the music video on Facebook. On 31 October, she uploaded the full version, it being later uploaded to her Vevo account. The video, directed by Ernst Weber and Pasha Shapiro, features Nissen singing while being dressed in several different outfits, supposedly part of several covers for the fictional magazines XC/TD & Excited. While she is singing, the words to the song appear as headlines on the magazine covers. The video also features will.i.am & Cody Wise. As of 28 January 2015 the video has generated over 136,000 views on YouTube.

== Track listing ==
Digital download
No.	Title	Length
1.	"I'm So Excited" (featuring will.i.am & Cody Wise)	3:39
2.	"I'm So Excited" (featuring will.i.am & Cody Wise) (Extended)	4:44
3.	"I'm So Excited" (featuring will.i.am & Cody Wise) (Denzal Park Remix)	4:07
4.	"I'm So Excited" (featuring will.i.am & Cody Wise) (Zac Waters Remix)	4:22

== Charts ==
Chart (2014)	Peak position
Australia (ARIA)	42
