= Cody Wise =

American singer (born 1995)

- Born: December 29, 1995 (age 30); Philadelphia, Pennsylvania U.S.
- Genres: Pop
- Occupation: Singer
- Years active: 2012–present
- Labels: Interscope Records, Pegasus Entertainment

Cody Wise (born December 29, 1995) is an American singer signed to Interscope Records through will.i.am's imprint. He is best known for featuring on "It's My Birthday" by will.i.am. The song, which was recorded in 2014 and released as a single on May 27, 2014, topped the charts in the United Kingdom, and peaked within the top ten of the charts in Australia. In addition to his music career, Wise has also made appearances in theater productions.

== Life and career ==
Wise was born in the Roxborough neighborhood of Philadelphia. He first started playing young Simba in the Broadway musical The Lion King and then followed with Broadway's Damn Yankees alongside Sean Hayes. He also had parts in The Scottsboro Boys and The Nutcracker. Wise's rendition of The Jackson 5's "Who's Loving You" at a concert called Fam Jams in Philadelphia caught the attention of will.i.am. Wise was just 13 at the time. He spent a few years developing his musical skills with encouragement from will.i.am. In 2014, Wise signed to Interscope Records and he has since then released a number of songs online, among which "It's My Birthday". will.i.am and Wise performed the song in the United Kingdom on May 29, 2014, appearing on the fourth semi-final of the eighth season of Britain's Got Talent.

== Discography ==
=== Singles ===
==== As lead artist ====
Title	Year	Album
"Love Like This"	2014	Non-album single

==== As featured artist ====
List of singles as featured artist, with selected chart positions and certifications, showing year released and album name
Title	Year	Peak chart positions				Certifications	Album
Title	Year	AUS	IRL	NZ	UK	Certifications	Album
"It's My Birthday" (will.i.am featuring Cody Wise)	2014	4	25	16	1	BPI: Gold	Non-album singles
"I'm So Excited" (Anja Nissen featuring will.i.am and Cody Wise)	2014	42	—	—	—		Non-album singles
"—" denotes a recording that did not chart or was not released in that territory.

=== Other appearances ===
Title	Year	Album
"My My My My Love" (with Sergio Mendes will.i.am)	2014	Magic
