= RouteNote =

Music distribution service

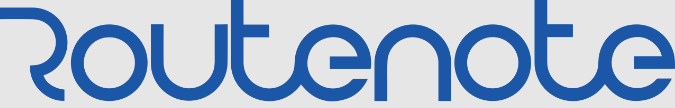
- Type: Private Company
- Industry: Music
- Genre: Digital distribution Music publishing
- Founded: 2007
- Founder: Steven Finch
- Headquarters: Truro, United Kingdom
- Area served: Worldwide
- Products: Online Music Distribution
- Services: Open platform music distribution and publishing administration.
- Number of employees: 250
- Website: www.routenote.com

RouteNote is a digital music distribution, publishing and licensing service founded in 2007. Based in Cornwall, United Kingdom, RouteNote allows artists to distribute music to online retailers including Spotify, iTunes and Amazon Music, among others.

The company supports 1,000,000+ artists and has facilitated the distribution of more than 10 million songs. It is noted for its offering of free and paid distribution services.

== History ==
RouteNote was founded in 2007 by Steven Finch.

In 2016, RouteNote announced a partnership with SoundCloud to allow artists to monetise their content on the platform.

In 2021, following the COVID-19 pandemic, RouteNote reported a 50% growth in its customer base in more than 193 countries.

In April 2021, the company opened an office in South Korea to support its partnership with Asian digital music platforms such as MelOn, Bugs! and Tencent Music.

== Services ==
RouteNote provides a multitude of services to facilitate the publishing of artists' music.

- Distribution: RouteNote distributes music to over 150 digital stores and streaming platforms.
- Analytics: RouteNote provides artists with analytics about their music, such as their songs' performance and where it is being played.
- Marketing: RouteNote offers artists marketing tools to help them promote their music, such as press release distribution and social media promotion. In 2022, Routenote partnered with PUSH.fm, a music marketing and promotion service.
- Royalties: Artists who use RouteNote's free distribution service receive 85% of the royalties generated from their music, while artists who use the paid distribution service receive 100% of the royalties. The RouteNote system for Content ID pays the original artist for any uses of their composition.
