= Seungri discography =

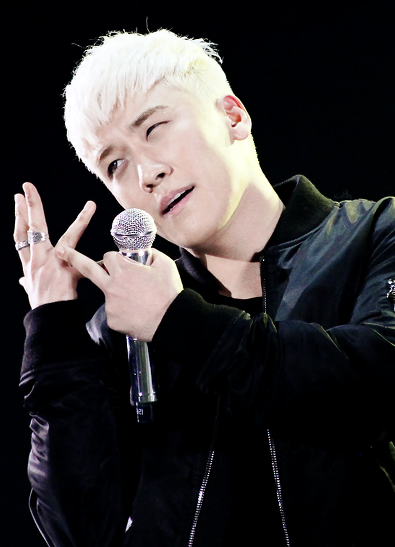
- Seungri performing on BigBang's Made World Tour concert in March 2016
- Studio albums: 2
- EPs: 2
- Singles: 5
- Music videos: 5

Korean singer Seungri began his career as the main dancer and vocalist of the Korean hip hop group Big Bang. His discography, as a solo artist, began in 2008, with the debut single "Strong Baby". He has released one studio album and two extended play, and several other singles/featured singles.

== Studio albums ==
Title	Details	Peak positions					Sales
Title	Details	KOR	FRA	JPN	TW	US World	Sales
Korean
The Great Seungri	Released: July 20, 2018; Label: YG Entertainment; Format: CD, digital download	1	82	5	9	3	KOR: 47,375; JPN: 24,666
Japanese
Let's Talk About Love	Released: October 9, 2013; Label: YG Entertainment; Format: CD, digital download	—	—	4	—	—	JPN: 14,509

== Extended plays ==
Title	Details	Peak chart positions				Sales
Title	Details	KOR	TW	US Heat	US World	Sales
V.V.I.P	Released: January 20, 2011; Label: YG Entertainment; Format: CD, digital download	1	9	—	—	KOR: 48,682
Let's Talk About Love	Released: August 19, 2013; Label: YG Entertainment; Format: CD, digital download	1	2	34	2	KOR: 79,222

== Singles ==
=== As a lead artist ===
Title	Year	Peak positions		Sales	Album
Title	Year	KOR	KOR 100	Sales	Album
Korean
"Strong Baby" (featuring G-Dragon)	2009	*	*	—N/a	Remember
"What Can I Do?"	2011	5	*	KOR: 1,119,709	V.V.I.P
"V.V.I.P"	2011	23	*	KOR: 787,742	V.V.I.P
"Gotta Talk to U" (할말 있어요)	2013	3	17	KOR: 359,716	Let's Talk About Love
"1, 2, 3!" (셋 셀테니)	2018	13	12	—N/a	The Great Seungri
"Where R U From" (featuring Song Mino)	2018	84	—	—N/a	The Great Seungri
Japanese
"The Feelings Painted in the Sky"	2013	—	—	—N/a	Let's Talk About Love
"—" denotes releases that did not chart or were not released in that region. "*" Billboard Korea K-Pop Hot 100 was introduced in August 2011 and discontinued in July 2014.

=== As featured artist ===
List of singles as featured artist, showing year released and album name
Title	Year	Peak chart positions						Certifications	Album
Title	Year	NOR	BEL	FIN	POL	SWE	US Dance	Certifications	Album
"Combo" (TPA featuring Al Rocco, Seungri and Ivy)	2018	—	—	—	—	—	—		Non-album singles
"Ignite" (K-391 featuring Alan Walker, Julie Bergan and Seungri)	2018	1	4	5	5	13	28	IFPI NOR: 3× Platinum; ZPAV: 2× Platinum	Ignite (Remixes)

=== Other charted songs ===
Title	Year	Peak positions		Sales	Album
Title	Year	KOR	KOR 100	Sales	Album
"I Know" (with IU)	2011	42	*	—N/a	V.V.I.P
"Open Window" (창문을 열어) (with G-Dragon)	2011	68	*	—N/a	V.V.I.P
"GG Be" (지지베) (featuring Jennie of Blackpink)	2013	18	38	KOR: 202,446	Let's Talk About; Love
"Let's Talk About Love" (feat. G-Dragon & Taeyang)	2013	15	31	KOR: 121,416	Let's Talk About; Love
"Come To My" (그딴 거 없어)	2013	46	51	KOR: 42,125	Let's Talk About; Love
"Love Box" (하나부터 열까지)	2013	48	62	KOR: 40,005	Let's Talk About; Love
"You Hoooo"	2013	51	81	KOR: 32,418	Let's Talk About; Love
"—" denotes releases that did not chart or were not released in that region. "*" Billboard Korea K-Pop Hot 100 was introduced in August 2011 and discontinued in July 2014.

=== Soundtrack appearances ===
Title	Year	Peak positions	Sales	Album
Title	Year	KOR	Sales	Album
"We Run Dis" (PKCZ featuring V.I)	2016	—N/a	Unreleased	High & Low: The Movie Soundtrack
"Faded"	2018	—N/a	Unreleased	Love Only OST

== Production credits ==
Year	Artist	Album	Song	Lyrics	Music
2006	BigBang	Bigbang is V.I.P	"V.I.P"	Yes	No
2006	BigBang	Bigbang Vol.1	"Intro (Big Bang)"	Yes	No
2006	BigBang	Bigbang Vol.1	"La La La"	Yes	No
2007	BigBang	Always	"We are Big Bang (Intro)"	Yes	No
2007	Lexy	Rush	"Super Fly	Yes	No
2011	Seungri	V.V.I.P	"VVIP"	Yes	Yes
2011	Seungri	V.V.I.P	"What Can I Do?"	Yes	Yes
2011	Seungri	V.V.I.P	"Magic"	Yes	Yes
2011	Seungri	V.V.I.P	"I Know"	Yes	Yes
2011	Seungri	V.V.I.P	"White Love"	Yes	Yes
2011	Seungri	V.V.I.P	"Outro (In My World)"	Yes	Yes
2013	Seungri	Let's Talk About Love	"Let`s Talk About Love"	Yes	Yes
2013	Seungri	Let's Talk About Love	"Gotta Talk to U"	Yes	Yes
2013	Seungri	Let's Talk About Love	"GG Be"	Yes	Yes
2013	Seungri	Let's Talk About Love	"Come to My"	Yes	Yes
2013	Seungri	Let's Talk About Love	"You Hoooo!!!"	Yes	Yes
2013	Seungri	Let's Talk About Love	"Love Box"	Yes	Yes
2013	Seungri	Let's Talk About Love	"The Feelings Painted In The Sky"	Yes	Yes
2018	Seungri	The Great Seungri	"1, 2, 3!"	Yes	Yes
2018	Seungri	The Great Seungri	"Where R U From"	Yes	Yes
2018	Seungri	The Great Seungri	"Love is You"	Yes	Yes
2018	Seungri	The Great Seungri	"MOLLADO"	Yes	Yes
2018	Seungri	The Great Seungri	"Sweet Lie"	Yes	No
2018	Seungri	The Great Seungri	"Be Friend"	Yes	Yes
2018	Seungri	The Great Seungri	"Hotline"	Yes	Yes
2018	Seungri	The Great Seungri	"Alone"	Yes	Yes
2018	Seungri	The Great Seungri	"Good Luck to You"	Yes	Yes

== Music videos ==
Year	Title	Album	MV
2008	"Strong Baby"	Remember	
2011	"What Can I Do"	V.V.I.P	
2011	"V.V.I.P"	V.V.I.P	
2013	"Gotta Talk to You"	Let's Talk About Love	
2018	"1, 2, 3!"	The Great Seungri	
2018	"Where R U From"	The Great Seungri	

== See also ==
- Big Bang discography
