= The Great Seungri (tour) =

2018–19 concert tour by Seungri

- Tour by Seungri
- Official poster for Seoul shows
- Location: Asia
- Associated album: The Great Seungri
- Start date: August 4, 2018
- End date: February 23, 2019
- Legs: 2
- No. of shows: 19 shows

The Great Seungri was a concert tour by South Korean singer Seungri. The tour began in Seoul, South Korea at the Jangchung Gymnasium on August 4, 2018, and concluded in Singapore at The Star Performing Arts Centre.

== Background and development ==
In May 2018, YGEX announced that Seungri (V.I) will kick off his first tour in Japan with six shows in three cities, Chiba, Fukuoka and Osaka set to commence in August. In August, it was announced that tour sold 78,000 tickets in Japan from three cities. An additional shows were announced due to high demand, selling out entire 1st leg of Japan tour, including 30,000 ticket from Chiba and 16,000 from Fukuoka, total 98,000 people attend from 3 cities.

In June, the dates for South Korea shows were announced, marking it as his first shows since debuting 12 years ago. The concert series was announced as The Great Seungri and will begin at the Jangchung Gymnasium in Seoul on August 4 and 5. 8,800 tickets were sold-out on the first two shows in Seoul, and due to tickets demands, the tour was expanded in South Korea, to include Daegu and Busan.

On December, a new shows were announced in South Korea, Hong Kong and Japan, under the name "The Great Seungri Tour 2019 ~The Great Show~ an encore of the tour.

On February 28, 2019, YG Entertainment announced the cancellation of the rest of 'The Great Seungri' tour that was supposed to be held in Osaka and Jakarta. This decision comes after Seungri's recent scandal, known as the Burning Sun scandal, YG also announced that Seungri would be taking a hiatus with halting all the upcoming promotions.

== Set list ==
1. "Strong Baby"
2. "Let's Talk About Love"
3. "GG BE"
4. "Gotta Talk 2 U"
5. "What Can I Do"
6. "Yoo Hoo!"
7. "Good Luck to You"
8. "Alone"
9. "If You"
10. "Mollado"
11. "Haru Haru"
12. "Love Is You"
13. "I Know"
14. "Come To My"
15. "Love Box"
16. "Last Farewell"
17. "Where R U From"
18. "Hotline"
19. "We Like 2 Party"
20. "My Heaven"
21. "Hands Up"
22. "Lies"
23. "1, 2, 3"
24. "Be Friend"

Encore

25. "Bang Bang Bang"
26. "Fantastic Baby"
27. "In My World"

== Tour dates ==
| Date | City | Country | Venue | Attendance |
Asia
| August 4, 2018 | Seoul | South Korea | Jangchung Gymnasium | 8,800 |
| August 5, 2018 | Seoul | South Korea | Jangchung Gymnasium | 8,800 |
| August 11, 2018 | Chiba | Japan | Makuhari Messe Exhibition Hall 1-3 | 98,000 (Note: The score data is combined from the shows held in Japan from 11, 12 August & 5, 6, 19, 20 September & 15, 16 December 2018 respectively.) |
| August 12, 2018 | Chiba | Japan | Makuhari Messe Exhibition Hall 1-3 | 98,000 |
| August 15, 2018 | Daegu | South Korea | EXCO 1st Floor | —N/a |
| August 19, 2018 | Busan | South Korea | BEXCO Exhibition Hall 1 | —N/a |
| September 5, 2018 | Fukuoka | Japan | Fukuoka Convention Center | |
| September 6, 2018 | Fukuoka | Japan | Fukuoka Convention Center | |
| September 19, 2018 | Osaka | Japan | Osaka-jō Hall | |
| September 20, 2018 | Osaka | Japan | Osaka-jō Hall | |
| December 15, 2018 | Osaka | Japan | Intex Osaka Hall 5 | |
| December 16, 2018 | Osaka | Japan | Intex Osaka Hall 5 | |
| January 12, 2019 | Hong Kong | | AsiaWorld–Expo Hall 10 | —N/a |
| January 19, 2019 | Pasay | Philippines | Mall of Asia Arena | —N/a |
| January 26, 2019 | Tokyo | Japan | Musashino Forest Sport Plaza | 52,000 (Note: The score data is combined from the shows held in Japan from 26, 27 January 2019 respectively.) |
| January 27, 2019 | Tokyo | Japan | Musashino Forest Sport Plaza | 52,000 |
| February 15, 2019 | Seoul | South Korea | SK Olympic Handball Gymnasium | 30,000 |
| February 16, 2019 | Seoul | South Korea | SK Olympic Handball Gymnasium | 30,000 |
| February 23, 2019 | Singapore | | The Star Performing Arts Centre | 1,600 |
| Total | | | | 220,000 |

== Canceled shows ==
List of cancelled concerts, showing date, city, country, venue and reason for cancellation
| Date | City | Country | Venue | Reason |
|---|---|---|---|---|
| March 9, 2019 | Osaka | Japan | Osaka-jō Hall | Investigated for Burning Sun scandal by the police, and later retirement as the result of the incident. |
| March 10, 2019 | Osaka | Japan | Osaka-jō Hall | Investigated for Burning Sun scandal by the police, and later retirement as the result of the incident. |
| March 17, 2019 | Jakarta | Indonesia | LIVESPACE SCBD | Investigated for Burning Sun scandal by the police, and later retirement as the result of the incident. |
