= The Star, Singapore =

Performance venue and shopping mall in Singapore

The Star Performing Arts Centre
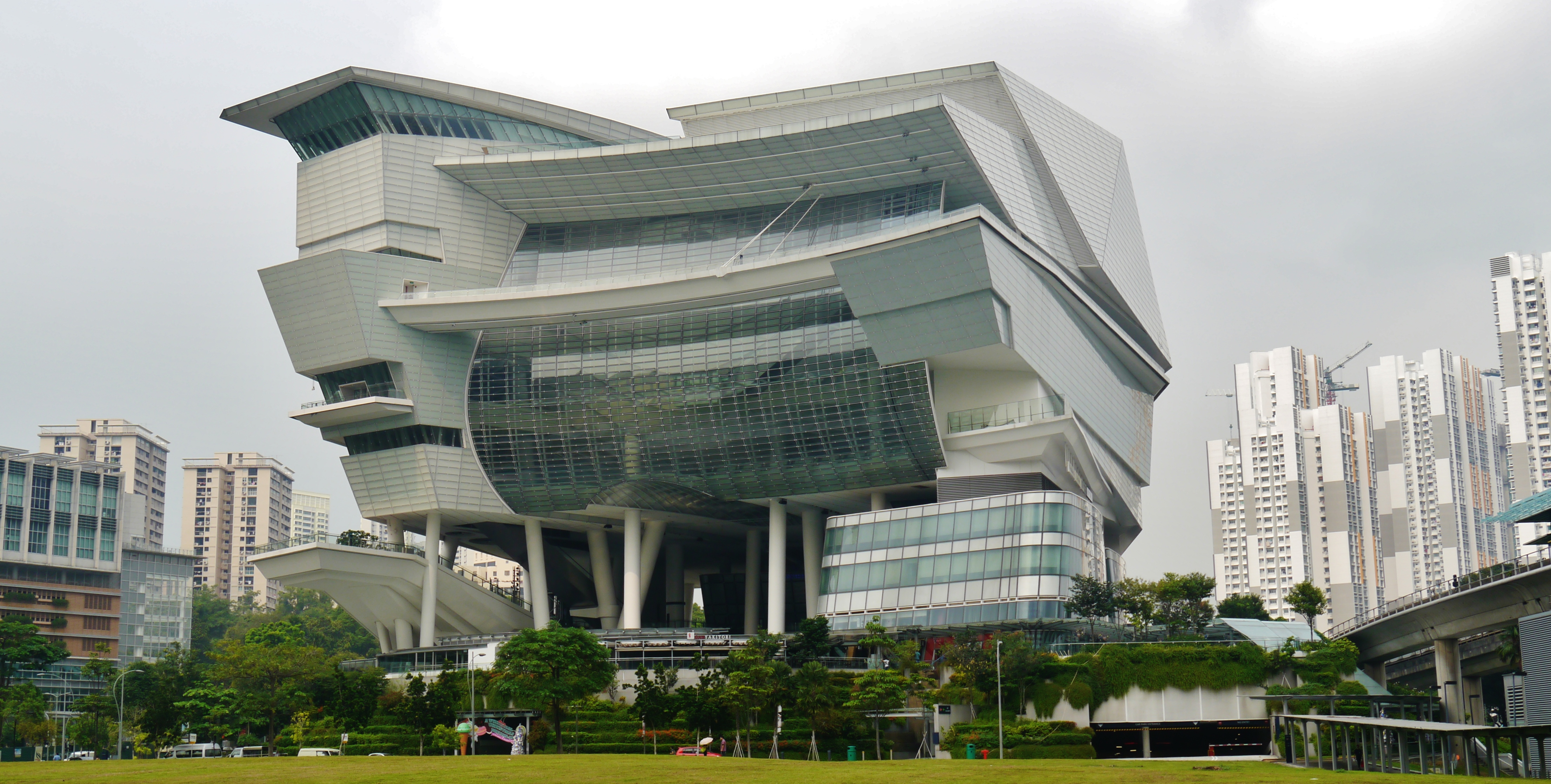
- The Star in 2015. The Star Performing Arts Centre occupies the upper half of the building, while The Star Vista occupies the lower half.
- Interactive map of The Star Performing Arts Centre
- Location: 1 Vista Exchange Green, Singapore 138617
- Coordinates: 1°18′24.91135″N 103°47′18.21967″E
- Owner: Rock Productions Pte Ltd
- Operator: Rock Productions Pte Ltd
- Capacity: 5,000
- Public transit: EW21 CC22 Buona Vista

Construction
- Opened: 1 November 2012; 14 years ago
- Cost: S$500 million
- Architect: Andrew Bromberg of Aedas

Tenant
- New Creation Church

Website
- www.thestar.sg

The Star Vista
- Opened: September 2012; 14 years ago
- Developer: CapitaLand
- Manager: Rock Productions Pte Ltd
- Owner: Rock Productions Pte Ltd
- Floor area: 162,500 square feet (15,100 m^{2})
- Floors: 3
- Website: thestarvista.sg

The Star is a 15-storey mixed-use complex in one-north, Singapore. It comprises a performing arts centre, The Star Performing Arts Centre, and a shopping mall, The Star Vista. The building was designed by Andrew Bromberg of the architectural firm Aedas, and was developed at a cost of S$500 million. It is owned by Rock Productions Pte Ltd, the business arm of the Singaporean megachurch New Creation Church. The Star Performing Arts Centre is used as the venue for New Creation Church's church services. The complex is adjacent to Buona Vista MRT station on the East West Line and Circle Line.

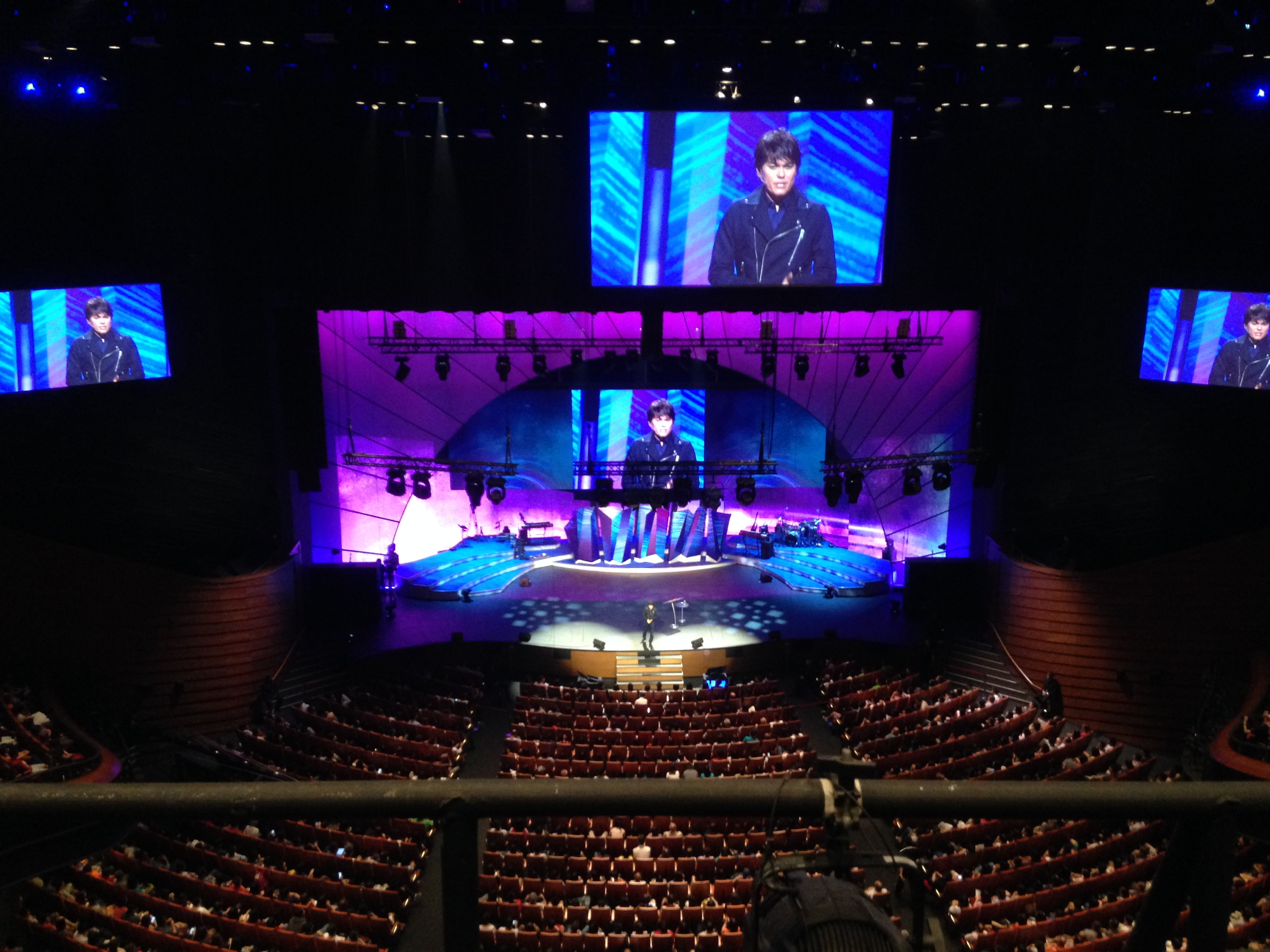
New Creation Church service held at The Star Performing Arts Centre in 2015

The Star Performing Arts Centre occupies the top nine floors of The Star, from levels 3 to 11, and includes The Star Theatre, a 5,000-seat auditorium. It also has a 770-seat function hall, an outdoor 300-seat amphitheatre, multi-purpose rooms, and a rooftop reception area. The centre was completed in October 2012 and officially opened on 1 November 2012 with an inaugural concert by David Foster.

The Star Vista is a three-storey shopping mall within The Star. It was developed by CapitaLand. The mall has 162,500 square feet (15,100 m^{2}) of retail space. In November 2019, Rock Productions acquired The Star Vista from CapitaLand for S$296 million after CapitaLand was reported to have been in talks with potential buyers. New Creation Church said the acquisition was necessary "to protect the interest of the church", citing concern that a buyer might have interests that conflicted with the church's use of The Star Performing Arts Centre for religious purposes.

== Entertainment events ==
Notable entertainment events held at The Star Performing Arts Centre
Date	Artist	Tour
2012
1 November	David Foster	—
2013
27 February	Norah Jones	Little Broken Hearts Tour
8 March	Adam Lambert	We Are Glamily Tour
12 March	Deep Purple	Now What? World Tour
2014
31 May	B.A.P	B.A.P Live On Earth 2014 Continent Tour
13 June	Ellie Goulding	The Halcyon Days Tour
21 June	Kyary Pamyu Pamyu	Nanda Collection World Tour
11 October	Khalil Fong (方大同)	Soulboy Lights Up 世界巡回演唱会2014新加坡站
13 December	BTS	2014 BTS Live Trilogy Episode II: The Red Bullet
2015
14 March	Ed Sheeran	x Tour
2 May	Backstreet Boys	In a World Like This Tour
1 June	Pentatonix	On My Way Home Tour
24 July	Michael Learns to Rock	Michael Learns To Rock: 25 Live
31 July	Planetshakers	—
6 November	Yiruma	Live in Singapore 2015
9 November	Richard Marx	—
1–2 December	Elton John	All the Hits Tour
8 December	Hillsong United	Empires Tour
2016
3 March	5 Seconds of Summer	Sounds Live Feels Live World Tour
4 April	Il Divo	Amor & Pasión Tour
9 April	Karen Mok (莫文蔚)	Regardez World Tour 看看世界巡回演唱会
23 May	Little Mix	The Get Weird Tour
4 June	Damien Rice	—
23 July	Sandy Lam (林忆莲)	Pranava 造乐者世界巡回演唱会
29 July	Tegan and Sara	—
20 September	Macklemore & Ryan Lewis	This Unruly Mess That I've Made Tour
2017
13 January	Passenger	Young As The Morning Old As The Sea Tour
16 January	Two Door Cinema Club	2016–2017 Tour
10 February	Journey	Eclipse Tour
18 February	Park Bo-gum	Asia Tour Fan Meeting in Singapore 2017
21 February	James Taylor	2017 World Tour
25 February	Yiruma	Live in Singapore 2017
4 March	A-Lin (阿林)	「Sonar 声吶世界巡回演唱会」新加坡回声限定场
17 March	Bethel Music	Worship Night – Live in Asia
8 April	Fifth Harmony	The 7/27 Tour
22 April	Rimi Natsukawa	Best of Rimi Natsukawa Live in Singapore
29 April	Twice	Twice 1st Tour: Twiceland – The Opening
27 May	Eric Moo (巫启贤)	My Music Journey 2017 Eric Moo in Singapore
14 August	Bastille	The Wild Wild World Tour
27 October	Taeyang	White Night World Tour
23 November	Harry Styles	Live on Tour
9 December	Shawn Mendes	Illuminate World Tour
2018
23 April	OneRepublic	Live in Singapore
4 May	Dua Lipa	The Self-Titled Tour
12 June	Niall Horan	Flicker World Tour
8 August	Halsey	Hopeless Fountain Kingdom World Tour
15 August	Clean Bandit	I Miss You Tour
20 October	Red Velvet	Redmare
3 November	Mariah Carey	Live in Concert
13 November	Charlie Puth	Voicenotes Tour
15 December	IU	Dlwlrma Tour
2019
23 February	Seungri	The Great Seungri Tour
9 March	Park Bo-gum	Asia Tour <Good Day> in Singapore
26 March	Pet Shop Boys	The Super Tour
3 May	Troye Sivan	The Bloom Tour
11 May	Jason Mraz	Good Vibes Tour
12 June	Boyzone	Thank You & Goodnight Tour
6 July	Kim Jae Hwan	Kim Jae Hwan Fan Meeting [MIN:D]
17 July	Bazzi	—
20 July	GFriend	Go Go GFriend!
27 July	AB6IX	AB6IX 1st Fanmeeting <1st ABNew>
19 August	Trevor Noah	Loud & Clear Tour
16 September	The 1975	Music for Cars Tour
28 September	The Try Guys	Legends of the Internet Tour
5 October	Day6	Day6 World Tour 'Gravity'
2 November	Pentagon	Pentagon World Tour 'Prism'
9 November	Rainie Yang	Youth Lies Within Tour
6–7 December	IU	Love, Poem Tour
2020
17 January	Bon Iver	—
11 February	Pentatonix	The World Tour
2022
28 May	Keith & Kristyn Getty	Sing! with Keith & Kristyn Getty Live in Singapore!
1 October	(G)I-dle	Just Me ( )I-dle World Tour
2023
28 January	Itzy	Checkmate World Tour
8–9 February	Mamamoo	My Con World Tour
21 April	Red Velvet	R to V
30 June	Ive	The Prom Queens Tour
8 August	David Foster	Hitman David Foster & Friends Asia Tour 2023
30 September	CityAlight	An Evening of Worship with CityAlight
15 November	Mamamoo+	Two Rabbits Code – Asia Tour
5 December	James Arthur	South East Asia Tour 2023
2024
16 February	STAYC	Teenfresh World Tour
4 March	Sum 41	Tour of the Setting Sum
7 March	Jack Johnson	Meet the Moonlight World Tour
1 May	Deep Purple	=1 More Time Tour
1 June	Tarcy Su	Flower of Life Tour
3–6 June	Trevor Noah	Off The Record Tour
15 June	BabyMonster	Babymonster Presents: See You There
22 June	Hwasa	The 1st Fancon Tour [Twits]
16 July	XG	The First Howl World Tour
28 October	Take That	This Life on Tour
31 October	Tate McRae	Think Later World Tour
5 November	Thom Yorke	Solo Tour
6–7 November	Ne-Yo	Champagne and Roses Tour
27 November	Porter Robinson	SMILE! :D World Tour
30 November	BoA	One's Own Live Tour
2025
3 February	Aurora	What Happened to the Earth?
21 February	Zhang Yuan	White World Tour
13 March	Kehlani	Crash World Tour
3 April	Gracie Abrams	The Secret of Us Tour
11–12 April	Russell Peters	Relax World Tour
7 May	Boys Like Girls	—
12 May	M2M	The Better Endings Tour
11 June	Original Singers Symphony	The Music of STUDIO GHIBLI
21 June	Kai	KAI SOLO CONCERT TOUR <KAION>
16 July	Doyoung	Doyoung Concert [Doors]
26 July	Xdinary Heroes	Beautiful Mind World Tour
1 August	Zhang Bichen	Epic of Love
4 August	Beabadoobee	Asia Tour 2025
4 July	Red Velvet – Irene & Seulgi	Balance Asia Tour
14 August	Park Bo-gum	Fan Meeting Tour 'Be With You'
16 August	STAYC	Stay Tuned Tour
11 November	Hillsong London	Hillsong London Asia Tour
19 November	Hatsune Miku	Miku Expo 2025 Asia
5 December	Roselia	ASIA TOUR 「Neuweltfahrt」
2026
28 March	DIOR (大颖)	Kampung Girl World Tour

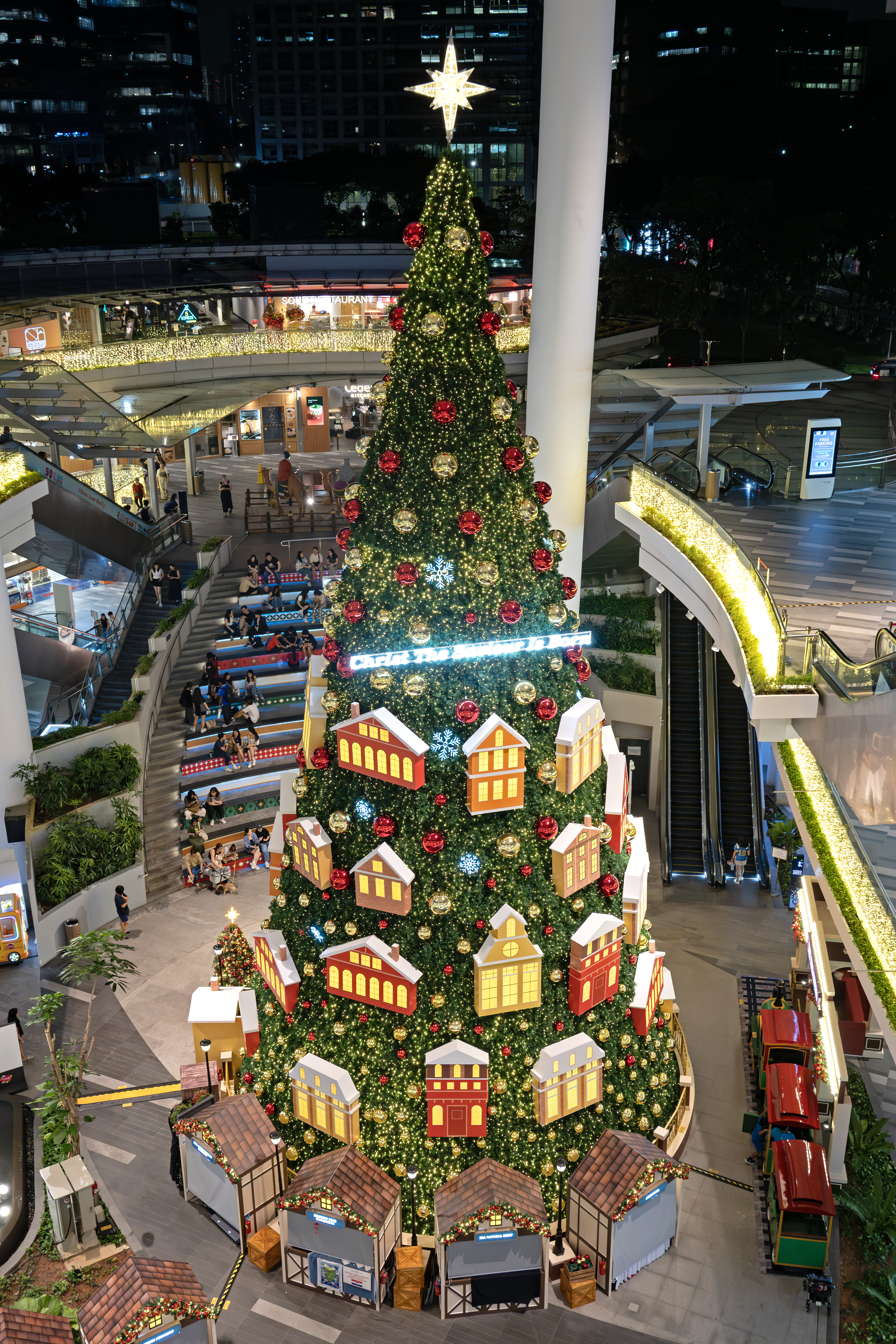
A Christmas tree display at The Star Vista

== Adam Lambert performance ==
In May 2013, the National Council of Churches of Singapore (NCCS) said it was looking into a complaint about singer Adam Lambert performing at The Star Performing Arts Centre. Lim K. Tham, the council's general secretary, said the NCCS had received a complaint that "the gay lifestyle may be promoted at the concert", a reference to Lambert's homosexuality, and that "the NCCS has conveyed this concern to New Creation so that it can make a response".

In a statement, the church said that the conditions set by the authorities before the tender was awarded to Rock Productions required the venue to operate "on a purely commercial basis and will not implement any leasing or pricing policies that will discriminate between religious groups, institutions or organisations from hiring the venue". The church said all public events required a public entertainment licence from the police, and that it had "utmost confidence" in the policies and ability of government bodies such as the Media Development Authority to "protect the interest of the general public". The statement added that an event at the performing arts centre "should not be misconstrued or misunderstood" as the church "approving of its artistic presentation or endorsing the lifestyle of the performer".
