= Zénith Paris =

Multipurpose indoor arena in France

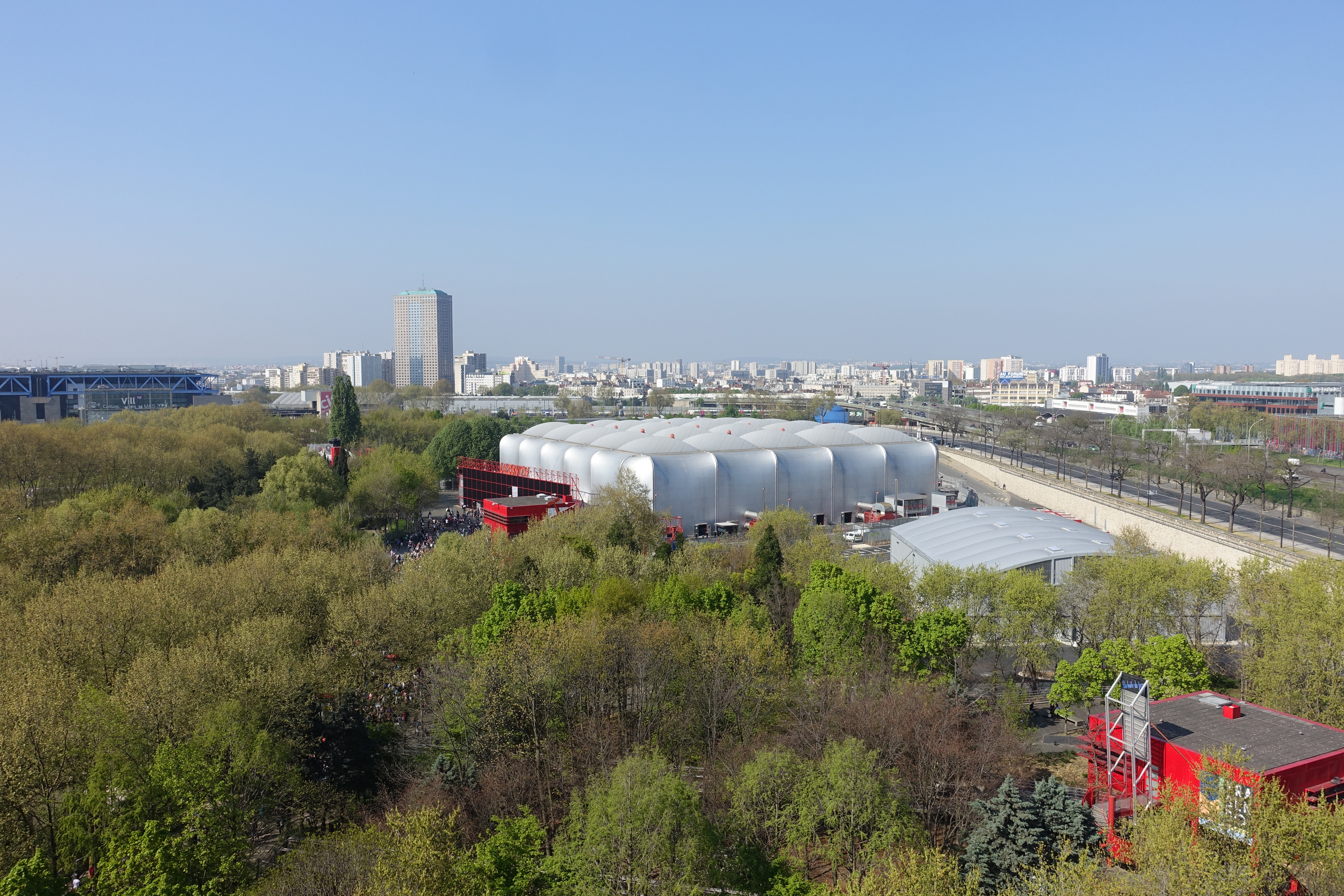
- Aerial view from Philharmonie de Paris (2017)
- Interactive map of Zénith Paris
- Full name: Zénith Paris – La Villette
- Former names: Zénith de Paris (1984–2013)
- Address: 211 Avenue Jean Jaurès; 75019 Paris; France
- Location: 19ème arrondissement Parc de la Villette, Paris, Île-de-France
- Coordinates: 48°53′39″N 2°23′35″E
- Owner: Ministère de la Culture
- Capacity: 6,300

Construction
- Built: 1983
- Opened: 12 January 1984
- Architects: Philippe Chaix and Jean-Paul Morel

Website
- Venue Website (in French)

Zénith Paris (originally known as Zénith de Paris, pronounced [zenit də paʁi]; and commonly referred to as Le Zénith, [lə zenit]) is a multi-purpose indoor arena in Paris, France. It is located in the Parc de la Villette in the 19th arrondissement on the edge of the Canal de l'Ourcq. Its ability to seat up to 6,293 people makes it one of the largest venues in Paris. The closest métro and RER stations are Porte de la Villette, Porte de Pantin, and Pantin.

It is the first venue to bear the moniker of Le Zénith; a group of theatre-style venues located in France each with a minimum capacity of 3,000. Because of this, the venue in Paris simply referred to as "Le Zénith" in many forms of media.

== History ==
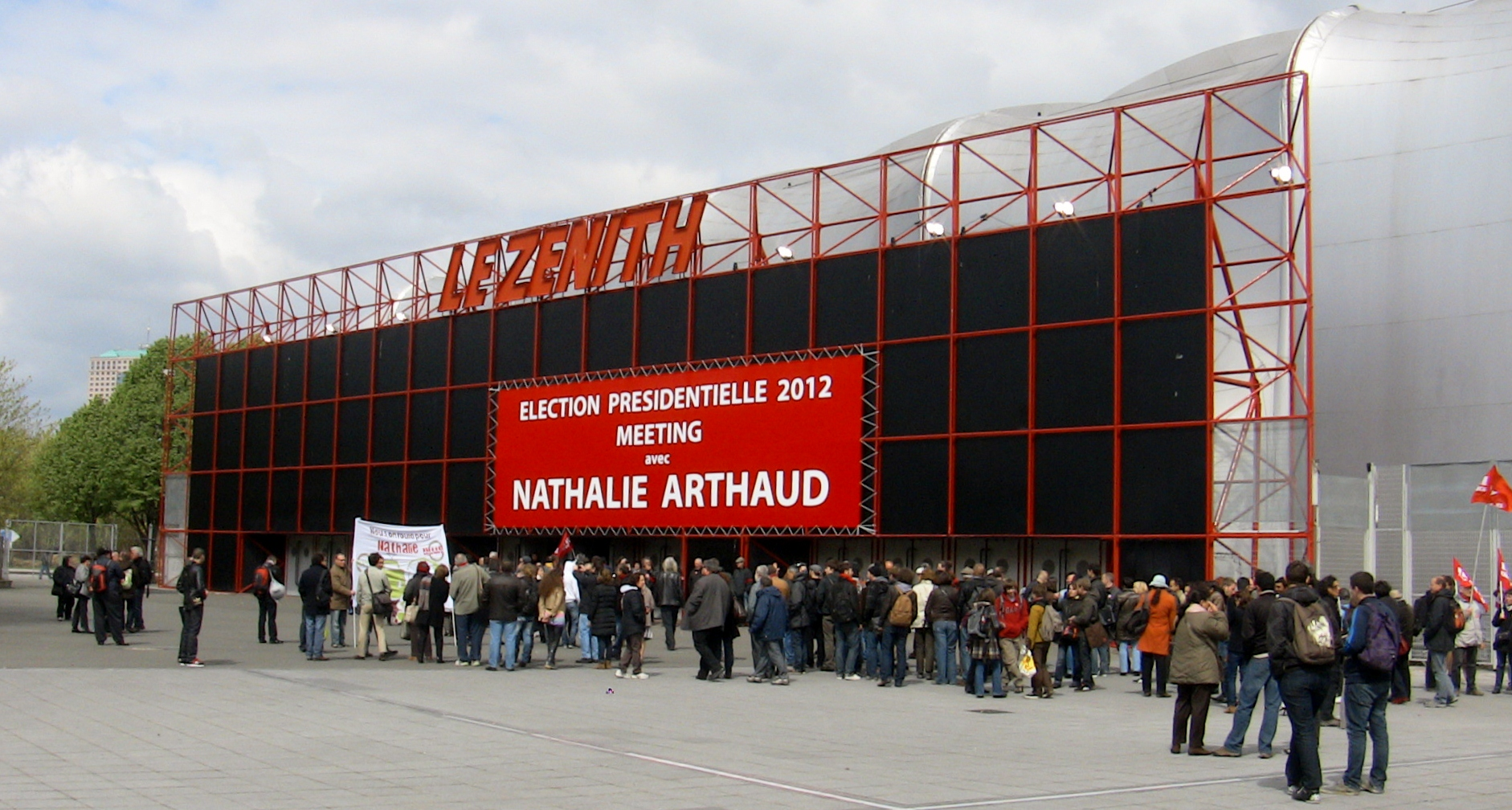
Exterior of arena during a meeting for the Lutte Ouvrière (2012)

The venue was built in 1983 to replace the Hippodrome de Pantin, a circus big-top which had become the main venue for touring rock bands visiting Paris (after the closing of the Pavillon de Paris). The Zénith was built on the same location as the old circus tent, and was designed by architects Philippe Chaix and Jean-Paul Morel on the initiative of Minister of Culture Jack Lang. It was inaugurated by Renaud at the start of 1984.

Somewhat reminiscent of the Eiffel Tower, this hall was intended to be used for a fixed term of three years after which it was to be dismantled and replaced by a new hall nearby. However, instead, its success gave birth to a chain of new halls throughout France, in Strasbourg, Toulouse, Montpellier, Nantes, Clermont-Ferrand, Rouen, Dijon, Pau, Toulon, Saint-Étienne, Caen, Orléans, Nancy, Amiens, Lille and Limoges. These halls are also named "Zénith", which is a trademark registered by COKER and the Ministry of Culture.

== Concerts ==
Entertainment events at the Zénith Paris
Date	Nationalities	Artists	Tours	Supporting Acts	Attendance	Box office
1984
17 January	France	Renaud	Il prend la mer pour séduire la fille	—N/a		
20 January	France	Renaud	Il prend la mer pour séduire la fille	—N/a		
22 January	France	Renaud	Il prend la mer pour séduire la fille	—N/a		
28 January	France	Renaud	Il prend la mer pour séduire la fille	—N/a		
2 February	France	Renaud	Il prend la mer pour séduire la fille	—N/a		
5 February	France	Renaud	Il prend la mer pour séduire la fille	—N/a		
14 March	United Kingdom	Saxon	The World Crusader Tour	—N/a		
10 April	United Kingdom	David Gilmour	About Face Tour	—N/a		
11 April	United Kingdom	David Gilmour	About Face Tour	—N/a		
27 April	Scotland	Simple Minds	Tour du Monde	China Crisis	—N/a	
7 May	United Kingdom	Joe Jackson	Body and Soul Tour	The Nits	—N/a	
10 May	United Kingdom	Status Quo	End of the Road Tour	—N/a		
13 May	United Kingdom	Ultravox	Set Movements Tour	—N/a		
15 May	United Kingdom	The Cure	The Top Tour	—N/a		
12 June	Ireland; Scotland	The Waterboys	'84 Tour	China Crisis	—N/a	
17 September	United Kingdom	Jethro Tull	Under Wraps Tour	—N/a		
1 October	United Kingdom; Argentina	Chris de Burgh	Man on the Line Tour	—N/a		
9 October	France	Téléphone	Un autre monde	—N/a		
10 October	France	Téléphone	Un autre monde	—N/a		
13 October	France	Téléphone	Un autre monde	—N/a		
14 October	France	Téléphone	Un autre monde	—N/a		
26 October	France	Johnny Hallyday	Johnny Hallyday au Zenith (Porte de Pantin)	—N/a		
27 October	France	Johnny Hallyday	Johnny Hallyday au Zenith (Porte de Pantin)	—N/a		
28 October	France	Johnny Hallyday	Johnny Hallyday au Zenith (Porte de Pantin)	—N/a		
30 October	France	Johnny Hallyday	Johnny Hallyday au Zenith (Porte de Pantin)	—N/a		
31 October	France	Johnny Hallyday	Johnny Hallyday au Zenith (Porte de Pantin)	—N/a		
1 November	France	Johnny Hallyday	Johnny Hallyday au Zenith (Porte de Pantin)	—N/a		
2 November	France	Johnny Hallyday	Johnny Hallyday au Zenith (Porte de Pantin)	—N/a		
3 November	France	Johnny Hallyday	Johnny Hallyday au Zenith (Porte de Pantin)	—N/a		
4 November	France	Johnny Hallyday	Johnny Hallyday au Zenith (Porte de Pantin)	—N/a		
5 November	United States	Kiss	Animalize World Tour	Bon Jovi	—N/a	
6 November	France	Johnny Hallyday	Johnny Hallyday au Zenith (Porte de Pantin)	—N/a		
7 November	France	Johnny Hallyday	Johnny Hallyday au Zenith (Porte de Pantin)	—N/a		
8 November	France	Johnny Hallyday	Johnny Hallyday au Zenith (Porte de Pantin)	—N/a		
9 November	France	Johnny Hallyday	Johnny Hallyday au Zenith (Porte de Pantin)	—N/a		
10 November	France	Johnny Hallyday	Johnny Hallyday au Zenith (Porte de Pantin)	—N/a		
11 November	France	Johnny Hallyday	Johnny Hallyday au Zenith (Porte de Pantin)	—N/a		
13 November	France	Johnny Hallyday	Johnny Hallyday au Zenith (Porte de Pantin)	—N/a		
14 November	France	Johnny Hallyday	Johnny Hallyday au Zenith (Porte de Pantin)	—N/a		
15 November	France	Johnny Hallyday	Johnny Hallyday au Zenith (Porte de Pantin)	—N/a		
16 November	France	Johnny Hallyday	Johnny Hallyday au Zenith (Porte de Pantin)	—N/a		
17 November	France	Johnny Hallyday	Johnny Hallyday au Zenith (Porte de Pantin)	—N/a		
18 November	France	Johnny Hallyday	Johnny Hallyday au Zenith (Porte de Pantin)	—N/a		
20 November	France	Johnny Hallyday	Johnny Hallyday au Zenith (Porte de Pantin)	—N/a		
21 November	France	Johnny Hallyday	Johnny Hallyday au Zenith (Porte de Pantin)	—N/a		
22 November	France	Johnny Hallyday	Johnny Hallyday au Zenith (Porte de Pantin)	—N/a		
23 November	France	Johnny Hallyday	Johnny Hallyday au Zenith (Porte de Pantin)	—N/a		
24 November	France	Johnny Hallyday	Johnny Hallyday au Zenith (Porte de Pantin)	—N/a		
25 November	France	Johnny Hallyday	Johnny Hallyday au Zenith (Porte de Pantin)	—N/a		
27 November	France	Johnny Hallyday	Johnny Hallyday au Zenith (Porte de Pantin)	—N/a		
28 November	France	Johnny Hallyday	Johnny Hallyday au Zenith (Porte de Pantin)	—N/a		
29 November	France	Johnny Hallyday	Johnny Hallyday au Zenith (Porte de Pantin)	—N/a		
30 November	France	Johnny Hallyday	Johnny Hallyday au Zenith (Porte de Pantin)	—N/a		
1 December	France	Johnny Hallyday	Johnny Hallyday au Zenith (Porte de Pantin)	—N/a		
2 December	France	Johnny Hallyday	Johnny Hallyday au Zenith (Porte de Pantin)	—N/a		
4 December	France	Johnny Hallyday	Johnny Hallyday au Zenith (Porte de Pantin)	—N/a		
5 December	France	Johnny Hallyday	Johnny Hallyday au Zenith (Porte de Pantin)	—N/a		
6 December	France	Johnny Hallyday	Johnny Hallyday au Zenith (Porte de Pantin)	—N/a		
7 December	France	Johnny Hallyday	Johnny Hallyday au Zenith (Porte de Pantin)	—N/a		
8 December	France	Johnny Hallyday	Johnny Hallyday au Zenith (Porte de Pantin)	—N/a		
9 December	France	Johnny Hallyday	Johnny Hallyday au Zenith (Porte de Pantin)	—N/a		
11 December	France	Johnny Hallyday	Johnny Hallyday au Zenith (Porte de Pantin)	—N/a		
12 December	France	Johnny Hallyday	Johnny Hallyday au Zenith (Porte de Pantin)	—N/a		
13 December	France	Johnny Hallyday	Johnny Hallyday au Zenith (Porte de Pantin)	—N/a		
14 December	France	Johnny Hallyday	Johnny Hallyday au Zenith (Porte de Pantin)	—N/a		
15 December	France	Johnny Hallyday	Johnny Hallyday au Zenith (Porte de Pantin)	—N/a		
16 December	France	Johnny Hallyday	Johnny Hallyday au Zenith (Porte de Pantin)	—N/a		
18 December	France	Johnny Hallyday	Johnny Hallyday au Zenith (Porte de Pantin)	—N/a		
19 December	France	Johnny Hallyday	Johnny Hallyday au Zenith (Porte de Pantin)	—N/a		
20 December	France	Johnny Hallyday	Johnny Hallyday au Zenith (Porte de Pantin)	—N/a		
21 December	France	Johnny Hallyday	Johnny Hallyday au Zenith (Porte de Pantin)	—N/a		
22 December	France	Johnny Hallyday	Johnny Hallyday au Zenith (Porte de Pantin)	—N/a		
23 December	France	Johnny Hallyday	Johnny Hallyday au Zenith (Porte de Pantin)	—N/a		
1986
3 March	United States	Mötley Crüe	Welcome to the Theatre of Pain Tour	T.N.T.	—N/a	
25 August	United States	Prince and the Revolution	Parade Tour	—N/a		
1988
18 April	United Kingdom	George Michael	Faith World Tour	—N/a		
May	South Africa	Johnny Clegg & Savuka	World Tour	—N/a		
1994
14 February	United States	Nirvana	In Utero European Tour	Buzzcocks	—N/a	
1996
7 November	United States	Pearl Jam	No Code Tour	Fastbacks	—N/a	
1998
22 March	United Kingdom	Spice Girls	Spiceworld Tour	—N/a		
23 March	United Kingdom	Spice Girls	Spiceworld Tour	—N/a		
2000
14 November	United States	Britney Spears	Oops!... I Did It Again Tour	—N/a		
2001
28 October	United Kingdom	Muse	Origin of Symmetry Tour	Zita Swoon	—N/a	
29 October	United Kingdom	Muse	Origin of Symmetry Tour	Zita Swoon	—N/a	
2002
7 September	Democratic Republic of the Congo	Zaïko Langa Langa	—N/a	—N/a	6,804 / 6,804	—N/a
2002
6 November	United Kingdom	Coldplay	A Rush of Blood to the Head Tour	—N/a		
2003
18 March	Canada	Avril Lavigne	Try to Shut Me Up Tour	Our Lady Peace	—N/a	
30 March	United Kingdom	Coldplay	A Rush of Blood to the Head Tour		—N/a	
9 October	United States	Christina Aguilera	Stripped World Tour	So Solid Crew	—N/a	
2004
25 May	United States	Evanescence	Fallen Tour	—N/a		
28 September	Canada	Avril Lavigne	Bonez Tour	—N/a		
2005
26 March	Australia	Kylie Minogue	Showgirl: The Greatest Hits Tour	Melody Club	—N/a	
2007
11 November	Barbados	Rihanna	Good Girl Gone Bad Tour	—N/a		
2010
12 October	Norway	A-ha	Ending On A High Note tour			
22 November
United Kingdom	Gorillaz	Escape to Plastic Beach Tour	Little Dragon & De La Soul	—N/a		
United Kingdom	Gorillaz	Escape to Plastic Beach Tour	Little Dragon & De La Soul	—N/a		23 November
United Kingdom	Gorillaz	Escape to Plastic Beach Tour	Little Dragon & De La Soul	—N/a		
United Kingdom	Gorillaz	Escape to Plastic Beach Tour	Little Dragon & De La Soul	—N/a		2011
17 March	United States	Taylor Swift	Speak Now World Tour	—N/a	3,598 / 8,500	$201,781
10 June	SMTown Live '10 World Tour			—N/a		
11 June	SMTown Live '10 World Tour			—N/a		
20 October	United States	Bruno Mars	The Doo-Wops & Hooligans Tour	Tanya Lacey	—N/a	
2012
6 April	South Korea	Super Junior	Super Show 4 World Tour	—N/a	7,123 / 7,123	$853,547
25 November	Ireland	The Cranberries	Roses Tour	Kodaline	—N/a	
2013
5 September	United States	Selena Gomez	Stars Dance Tour	Timeflies	—N/a	
7 September	United States	Paramore	The Self-Titled Tour	Fenech-Soler	—N/a	
7 November	United Kingdom	Arctic Monkeys	AM Tour	The Strypes	—N/a	
8 November	United Kingdom	Arctic Monkeys	AM Tour	The Strypes	—N/a	
2014
23 February	Taiwan	Mayday	Mayday Nowhere World Tour	—N/a		
30 April	South Korea	B.A.P	B.A.P Live on Earth 2014 Continent Tour	—N/a		
30 October	United States	Lady Gaga	Artrave: The Artpop Ball	Lady Starlight	—N/a	
31 October	United States	Lady Gaga	Artrave: The Artpop Ball	Lady Starlight	—N/a	
28 November	France	Gesaffelstein	—N/a			
2015
18 February	Argentina	Violetta	Violetta Live	—N/a		
19 February	Argentina	Violetta	Violetta Live	—N/a		
20 February	Argentina	Violetta	Violetta Live	—N/a		
21 February	Argentina	Violetta	Violetta Live	—N/a		
22 February	Argentina	Violetta	Violetta Live	—N/a		
16 March	Ireland	The Script	No Sound Without Silence Tour	Colton Avery; Tinie Tempah	—N/a	
25 March	Trinidad & Tobago	Nicki Minaj	The Pinkprint Tour	Trey Songz; Ester Dean	—N/a	
26 March	Trinidad & Tobago	Nicki Minaj	The Pinkprint Tour	Trey Songz; Ester Dean	—N/a	
14 May	United States	Ariana Grande	The Honeymoon Tour	Rixton	—N/a	
15 May	United States	Ariana Grande	The Honeymoon Tour	Rixton	—N/a	
22 May	Australia	5 Seconds of Summer	Rock Out with Your Socks Out Tour	Hey Violet	—N/a	
24 May	United States	Maroon 5	Maroon V Tour		—N/a	
15 September	Argentina	Violetta	Violetta Live		—N/a	
16 September	Argentina	Violetta	Violetta Live		—N/a	
2 November	United States	Imagine Dragons	Smoke + Mirrors Tour	Sunset Sons	—N/a	
17 November	United Kingdom	Simply Red	Big Love 30th Anniversary Tour	—N/a		
2016
31 January	Australia	Tame Impala	Currents Tour	Jagwar Ma	—N/a	
25 February	United Kingdom	Ellie Goulding	Delirium World Tour	Sara Hartman	—N/a	
30 May	United States	Pentatonix	2016 World Tour	Us the Duo	—N/a	
18 October	United States	Fifth Harmony	7/27 Tour	Camryn and Aleem	—N/a	
17 November	United States	Twenty One Pilots	Emotional Roadshow World Tour	Bry	—N/a	
2017
8 June	United Kingdom	Little Mix	The Glory Days Tour	The Vamps	—N/a	
24 November	United Kingdom	Gorillaz	Humanz Tour	Little Simz	—N/a	
25 November	United Kingdom	Gorillaz	Humanz Tour	Little Simz	—N/a	
2018
24 February	Argentina	Soy Luna	Soy Luna Live	—N/a		—N/a
25 February	Argentina	Soy Luna	Soy Luna Live			—N/a
3 March	United States	The Killers	Wonderful Wonderful World Tour	TBA		—N/a
3 April	United States	Fall Out Boy	Mania Tour	Against the Current; MAX		—N/a
13 April	United States	Macklemore	Gemini Tour	TBA		—N/a
18 April	Ireland	Niall Horan	Flicker World Tour	Julia Michaels		—N/a
4 June	United States	Demi Lovato	Tell Me You Love Me World Tour	Joy		—N/a
10 June	South Korea	Got7	Eyes On You Tour	—N/a		
14 October	United States	Jason Derulo	The 777 Tour	TBA	—N/a	
16 November	Netherlands	Within Temptation	Resist Tour	Ego Kill Talent	—N/a	
2019
19 March	United States	Panic! at the Disco	Pray for the Wicked Tour	A R I Z O N A	—N/a	
26 May	South Korea	Blackpink	"In Your Area" World Tour	—N/a	6,224	$915,475
8 November	United Kingdom	Marina	Love + Fear Tour	Allie X	—N/a	
2020
16 January	Japan	Hatsune Miku	Hatsune Miku Expo 2020 Europe	Megurine Luka; Kagamine Rin & Len; Meiko; Kaito	—N/a	
3 June	United States	Tyler, the Creator	Igor Tour	—N/a		
2022
21 June	United States	Olivia Rodrigo	Sour Tour	Baby Queen	—N/a	
21 June	Norway	Alan Walker	Walkerverse: The Tour	—N/a		
2023
30 March	South Korea	NCT Dream	The Dream Show 2: In A Dream	—N/a		
12 April	Canada	Avril Lavigne	Love Sux Tour	Girlfriends; Phem	—N/a	
3 July	United States	Sabrina Carpenter	Emails I Can't Send Tour	Annika Bennett	6,800 / 6,800	$377,555
13 September	South Korea	(G)I-dle	I Am Free-ty World Tour	—N/a		
26 November	United States	Melanie Martinez	Portals Tour	Upsahl		
26 May	South Korea	P1Harmony	P1Harmony Live Tour [P1ustage H: Utop1a]	—N/a		
22 November	China	Joker Xue	Extraterrestrial World Tour	—N/a		
2024
25 February	South Korea	Dreamcatcher	Luck Inside 7 Doors World Tour	—N/a		
28 February	United Kingdom	James Blunt	Who We Used to Be Tour	—N/a		
1 March	United Kingdom	The 1975	Still... At Their Very Best	Been Stellar	—N/a	
5 March	United States	Ne-Yo	Champagne and Roses Tour	—N/a		
20 March	United States	Madison Beer	The Spinnin Tour	Jann; Jillian Rossi	—N/a	
30 March	France	Soul Brothers	Remise des Diplômes de l'Efrei Paris		—N/a	
26 April	South Korea	Itzy	Born to Be World Tour	—N/a		
17 May	Canada	Tate McRae	Think Later World Tour	charlieonnafriday	—N/a	
7 July	United States	Megan Thee Stallion	Hot Girl Summer Tour	Ms Banks	—N/a	
11 September	Norway	Girl in Red	Doing It Again Tour	—N/a		
21 October	United States	Lizzy McAlpine	The Older Tour	—N/a		
29 October	Japan	Hatsune Miku	2024 Hatsune Miku Expo Europe	Megurine Luka; Kagamine Rin & Len; Meiko; Kaito	—N/a	
5 November	United States	Conan Gray	Found Heaven On Tour	Between Friends	—N/a	
2025
27 January	United States	Kehlani	Crash World Tour	Kwn; Keyrah	—N/a	
4 March	South Korea	Aespa	Synk: Parallel Line	—N/a		
10 March	South Korea	Kiss of Life	Kiss Road	—N/a		
12 March	South Korea	Taemin	Ephemeral Gaze	—N/a		
5 May	Norway	Aurora	What Happened to the Earth?	Fredrik Svabø & Joanna	—N/a	
28 May	Japan	BABYMETAL	BABYMETAL World Tour 2025	Poppy & Bambie Thug	sold out	—N/a
30 June	United States	Camila Cabello	Yours, C Tour	—N/a		
10 November	New Zealand	Lorde	Ultrasound World Tour	Jim-E Stack	—N/a	
1 December	United Kingdom	Ed Sheeran	Loop Tour		—N/a	
3 December	United States	Big Time Rush	In Real Life Worldwide Tour	Katelyn Tarver; Stephen Kramer Glickman	—N/a	
2026
6 March	United States	Kesha; Scissor Sisters	The Tits Out Tour	Sizzy Rocket	—N/a	
12 May	United States	The Neighbourhood	Wourld Tour	Neggy Gemmy; Noise Dept.	—N/a	
31 May	United States	PinkPantheress	An Evening With... PinkPantheress	—N/a		
20 September	Japan	LiSA	LiVE is Smile Always ~ 15~			

== See also ==
- Le Zénith
- List of indoor arenas in France
- Parc de la Villette
- Cité des Sciences et de l'Industrie, City of Science and Industry in Parc de la Villette
- La Géode, an IMAX domed theatre in Parc de la Villette
- Cité de la musique, City of Music, in Parc de la Villette
- Ronin, a 1998 action thriller film featuring the venue
