= List of P1Harmony live performances =

P1Harmony live performances
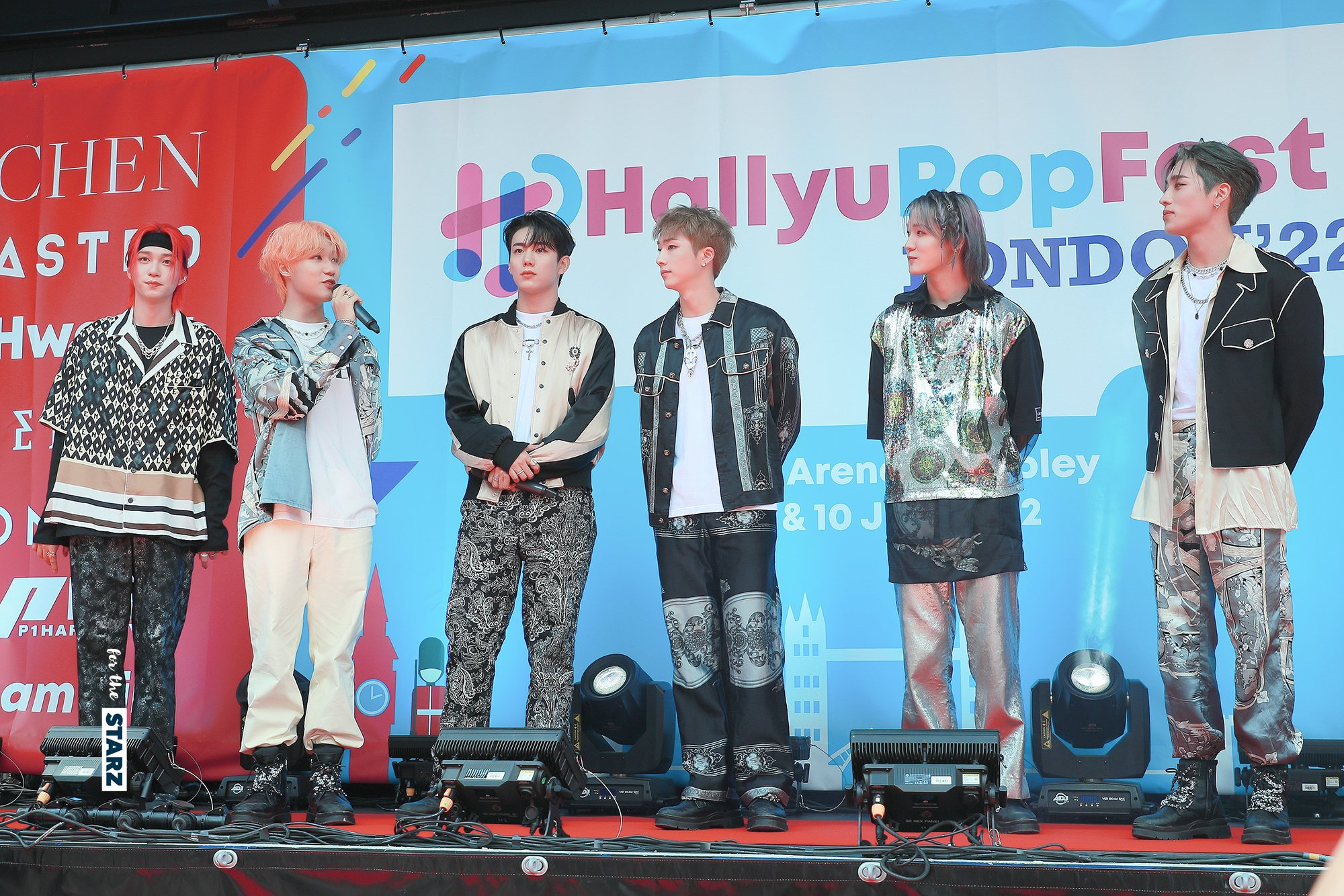
- P1Harmony at the HallyuPopFest London 2022
- Concert tours: 4

This is a list of the live performances held by the South Korean boy group P1Harmony.

== 2022 P1Harmony Live Tour [P1ustage H: Peace] ==
=== Set List ===
Seoul, South Korea (February 26, 2022)
1. "Pyramid"
2. "Bop"
3. "Do It Like This"
4. "Before The Dawn"
5. "That's It"
6. "Reset"
7. Solo stage (performed by Soul)
8. "Off My Face" (Justin Bieber cover; performed by Theo and Jiung)
9. Unit stage (performed by Keeho, Intak, and Jongseob)
10. "If You Call Me"
11. "Butterfly"
12. "Scared"
13. "Siren"
14. "Follow Me"

Encore

15. "Peacemaker"
16. "Ayaya"

=== Shows ===
Date	City	Country	Venue	Ref.
February 26, 2022	Seoul	South Korea	Yes 24 Live Hall	
March 10, 2022	New York	United States	The Town Hall	
March 11, 2022	New York	United States	The Town Hall	
March 13, 2022	Washington, D.C.	United States	Warner Theatre	
March 16, 2022	Miami	United States	The Fillmore Miami Beach	
March 18, 2022	Houston	United States	713 Music Hall	
May 8, 2022	Atlanta	United States	Coca-Cola Roxy	
May 11, 2022	Chicago	United States	Copernicus Center	
May 13, 2022	Denver	United States	Fillmore Auditorium	
May 15, 2022	Los Angeles	United States	The Theatre at Ace Hotel	
May 16, 2022	Los Angeles	United States	The Theatre at Ace Hotel	
May 18, 2022	San Jose	United States	San Jose Civic	

On March 20, the postponement of the show in Chicago was announced after several staff members tested positive for COVID-19. On March 21, it was reported that all of the members except Intak had tested positive for the virus. As a result, the rest of the tour's shows dating March 20–28 were rescheduled to May 8–18.

== 2023 P1Harmony Live Tour [P1ustage H: P1oneer] ==
=== Set List ===
Seoul, South Korea (January 14–15, 2023)
1. "Look At Me Now"
2. "Back Down"
3. "Scared"
4. "Me Too (나도 그래)"
5. "Doom Du Doom"
6. "End It"
7. "Black Hole"
8. "21" (Dean cover; performed by Theo)
9. "Hug Me" (Jung Joon-il cover; performed by Soul)
10. "Déja Vu" (Beyoncé cover; performed by Keeho)
11. "Love Never Felt So Good" (Michael Jackson cover; performed by Keeho, Jiung, and Soul)
12. Unit stage (performed by Intak and Jongseob)
13. "Siren"
14. "Mirror Mirror"
15. "Follow Me"
16. "Gotta Get Back"
17. "Nemonade"
18. "Secret Sauce"
19. "Do It Like This"
20. "Breakthrough"
21. "BFF"
22. "Speaker"

Encore

23. "One and Only"
24. "Ayaya"

=== Shows ===
Date	City	Country	Venue	Ref.
January 14, 2023	Seoul	South Korea	Blue Square Mastercard Hall	
January 15, 2023	Seoul	South Korea	Blue Square Mastercard Hall	
January 20, 2023	Los Angeles	United States	Hollywood Palladium	
January 22, 2023	Oakland	United States	Paramount Theatre	
January 24, 2023	Denver	United States	Fillmore Auditorium	
January 26, 2023	Houston	United States	713 Music Hall	
January 29, 2023	Chicago	United States	Chicago Theatre	
February 1, 2023	Atlanta	United States	Coca-Cola Roxy	
February 3, 2023	Reading	United States	Santander Arena	
February 5, 2023	New York	United States	Terminal 5	
February 8, 2023	Washington, D.C.	United States	MGM National Harbor	
February 12, 2023	Nashville	United States	Grand Ole Opry	
February 14, 2023	Austin	United States	ACL Live	
February 16, 2023	Dallas	United States	Music Hall at Fair Park	
July 9, 2023	Vancouver	Canada	The Orpheum	
July 12, 2023	Toronto	Canada	Rebel	
July 14, 2023	San Juan	Puerto Rico	Convention Center	
July 16, 2023	Bogotá	Colombia	Royal Center	
July 19, 2023	Quito	Ecuador	CCMQ	
July 21, 2023	São Paulo	Brazil	Tokio Marine Hall	
July 23, 2023	Porto Alegre	Brazil	Pepsi on Stage	
July 26, 2023	Santiago	Chile	Teatro Teletón	
July 28, 2023	Monterrey	Mexico	Pabellón M	
July 30, 2023	Mexico City	Mexico	Frontón México	
September 5, 2023	Hong Kong		MacPherson Stadium	
September 9, 2023	Manila	Philippines	New Frontier Theater	
September 17, 2023	Singapore		The Theatre at Mediacorp	
September 20, 2023	Melbourne	Australia	Festival Hall (Melbourne)	
September 22, 2023	Sydney	Australia	Hordern Pavilion	
September 24, 2023	Auckland	New Zealand	Spark Arena	
October 4, 2023	Taipei	Taiwan	Zepp New Taipei	
October 7, 2023	Bangkok	Thailand	Samyan Mitrtown Hall	
October 14, 2023	Jakarta	Indonesia	The Kasablanka Hall	
November 12, 2023	Paris	France	Zénith Paris - La Villete	
November 13, 2023	Zurich	Switzerland	X-TRA	
November 15, 2023	Berlin	Germany	Columbiahalle	
November 20, 2023	Tokyo	Japan	Toyosu PIT	
November 22, 2023	Osaka	Japan	Namba Hatch	
January 10, 2024	Madrid	Spain	Palacio Vistalegre	
January 12, 2024	London	England	Troxy	
January 14, 2024	Oberhausen	Germany	Turbinenhalle	

On November 9, FNC Entertainment announced that the show in Oberhausen scheduled on the same day will be postponed due to Theo's and Jiung's health. On November 16, the company also announced the postponement of the November 17 show in Madrid due to unforeseen circumstances.

On December 6, FNC Entertainment released the rescheduled dates for the canceled shows in Europe and added London as a new stop for the show.

== 2024 P1Harmony Live Tour [P1ustage H: Utop1a] ==
=== Set List ===
Seoul, South Korea (April 27–28, 2024)
1. "Street Star"
2. "Emergency"
3. "Everybody Clap"
4. "Heartbeat Drum"
5. "I Am You"
6. "Butterfly"
7. "Late Night Calls"
8. "Killin' It"
9. "Back Down"
10. "Until I Found You" (Stephen Sanchez cover; performed by Theo)
11. "On My Mama" (Victoria Monét cover; performed by Intak)
12. "Praise The Lord" (A$AP Rocky cover; performed by Jongseob)
13. "Kill Bill" or "Wildflower" (SZA cover; performed by Keeho)
14. Solo stage (performed by Soul)
15. "Baby" (Justin Bieber cover; performed by Jiung)
16. "Pyramid"
17. "Black Hole"
18. "Look At Me Now"
19. "Fall In Love Again"
20. "BFF"
21. "Love Me For Me"
22. "Doom Du Doom"
23. "Jump"
24. "Follow Me"
25. "Countdown To Love"

Encore

26. "I See U"
27. "2nite"
28. "Do It Like This"
29. "Ayaya"

=== Shows ===
Date	City	Country	Venue	Notes	Ref.
April 27, 2024	Seoul	South Korea	Olympic Hall		
April 28, 2024	Seoul	South Korea	Olympic Hall		
May 14, 2024	Houston	United States	Smart Financial Centre		
May 17, 2024	Dallas	United States	Music Hall at Fair Park		
May 20, 2024	Chicago	United States	Credit Union 1 Arena		
May 24, 2024	Toronto	Canada	Coca-Cola Coliseum		
May 26, 2024	Boston	United States	Boch Center - Wang Theatre		
May 30, 2024	Washington, D.C.	United States	The Anthem		
June 1, 2024	Atlanta	United States	Fox Theatre	Canceled	
June 3, 2024	Nashville	United States	The Grand Ole Opry		
June 5, 2024	Miami	United States	James L. Knight Center		
June 14, 2024	Oakland	United States	Oakland Arena		
June 16, 2024	Los Angeles	United States	The Kia Forum		
July 13, 2024	Macau		JW Marriott Grand Ballroom		
July 16, 2024	Auckland	New Zealand	The Trusts Arena		
July 18, 2024	Melbourne	Australia	Festival Hall		
July 21, 2024	Sydney	Australia	ICC Sydney		
August 17, 2024	Hong Kong		AXA Dreamland, Go Park		
January 3, 2025	Milan	Italy	Fabrique		
January 5, 2025	Oberhausen	Germany	Turbinenhalle 1		
January 8, 2025	Helsinki	Finland	Black Box		
January 10, 2025	Berlin	Germany	Uber Eats Music Hall		
January 13, 2025	London	United Kingdom	Troxy		
January 15, 2025	Paris	France	Arena Grand Paris		
January 17, 2025	Lisbon	Portugal	Lisboa Ao Vivo Sala Multiusos		
January 19, 2025	Łódź	Poland	Atlas Arena		

On May 4, FNC Entertainment announced that they will temporarily halt Jiung's future activities including his participation in the tour due to an injury he sustained during the Seoul stop. On the 22nd, the company released new dates for Australia and New Zealand.

On June 2 (June 1 in EDT), FNC Entertainment released the cancellation notice for the Atlanta show hours before the event due to water main breaks across the city. On the same day, the company announced an additional stop in Macau.

The show in Warsaw got changed to Łódź on the 21st of October 2024.

The show in Amsterdam got changed to Oberhausen on 23rd of October 2024, with the following message from StudioPav: ”Due to unexpected circumstances at the venue in Amsterdam, we’ve made a slight adjustment to the tour schedule. But don’t worry—we’re thrilled to announce a new show in Oberhausen, Germany, on January 5th! It’s just a short 2-hour trip from Amsterdam, so fans can still join us for an incredible experience.”

== 2025 P1Harmony Live Tour [P1ustage H: Most Wanted] ==
=== Set List ===
Seoul, South Korea (August 8-9, 2025)
1. "Black Hole"
2. "End It"
3. "Look At Me Now"
4. "Breakthrough"
5. "Emergency"
6. "DUH!"
7. "Scared"
8. "Before The Dawn"
9. "Uptown Funk" (Bruno Mars cover; performed by Jiung)
10. "Creep" (Radiohead cover; performed by Keeho)
11. Solo stage (performed by Soul)
12. "Good Kisser" (Usher cover; performed by Intak)
13. Solo stage (performed by Jongseob)
14. "Dreams, Books, Power and Walls" (Jannabi cover; performed by Theo)
15. "Wasp"
16. "Work"
17. "Bop"
18. "Pretty Boy"
19. "BFF"
20. "Everybody Clap"
21. "Do It Like This"
22. "Jump"
23. "Heartbeat Drum"
24. "Follow Me"
25. "Flashy"

Encore

26. "Countdown To Love"
27. "AYAYA"
28. "Last Call"
29. "Follow Me"

=== Shows ===
Date	City	Country	Venue	Notes	Ref.
August 8, 2025	Seoul	South Korea	Korea University Hwajeong Tiger Dome		
August 9, 2025	Seoul	South Korea	Korea University Hwajeong Tiger Dome		
August 23, 2025	Sydney	Australia	Hordern Pavilion		
August 30, 2025	Singapore		Singapore Expo		
September 6, 2025	Kaohsiung	Taiwan	Kaohsiung Music Center		
September 13, 2025	Macau	China	Studio City Event Center		
September 19, 2025	Yokohama	Japan	TBA		
September 27, 2025	Newark	United States	Prudential Center		
September 29, 2025	Fairfax	United States	EagleBank Arena		
October 7, 2025	Toronto	Canada	Coca-Cola Coliseum		
October 4, 2025	Fort Worth	United States	Dickies Arena		
October 9, 2025	Duluth	United States	Gas South Arena		
October 14, 2025	Chicago	United States	United Center		
October 18, 2025	Los Angeles	United States	Intuit Dome		
October 21, 2025	Oakland	United States	Oakland Arena		
October 24, 2025	São Paulo	Brazil	Vibra São Paulo		
October 27, 2025	Buenos Aires	Argentina	Microestadio Malvinas Argentinas		
October 29, 2025	Lima	Peru	Anfiteatro del Parque de la Exposición		
November 2, 2025	Santiago	Chile	Teatro Caupolicán		
November 4, 2025	Monterrey	Mexico	Auditorio Banamex		
January 15, 2026	Amsterdam	The Netherlands	AFAS Live		
January 18, 2026	Munich	Germany	Zenith		
January 22, 2026	Gdańsk	Poland	Ergo Arena		
January 25, 2026	Berlin	Germany	Uber Eats Music Hall		
January 28, 2026	Paris	France	Arena Grand Paris		
January 30, 2026	London	United Kingdom	OVO Arena Wembley		
February 10, 2026	Tokyo	Japan	Tokyo Garden Theater		
March 7, 2026	Seoul	South Korea	SK Olympic Handball Gymnasium		
March 8, 2026	Seoul	South Korea	SK Olympic Handball Gymnasium		

== Concert participations ==
Year	Date	Title	City	Country	Venue	Ref.
2022	July 9	HallyuPopFest London 2022	London	United Kingdom	OVO Arena Wembley	
2022	July 16	2022 G-KPOP Concert	Seoul	South Korea	—	
2022	August 13	HallyuPopFest Sydney 2022	Sydney	Australia	Qudos Bank Arena	
2022	September 10	Hyperound K-Fest Abu Dhabi 2022	Abu Dhabi	United Arab Emirates	Ethad Arena	
2022	September 30	KCON 2022 Saudi Arabia	Riyadh	Saudi Arabia	Boulevard Riyadh City	
2022	October 15	KAMP LA 2022	Los Angeles	United States	Rose Bowl Stadium	
2022	October 19	MU:CON 2022 Showcase	Seoul	South Korea	Nodeul Island	
2022	December 17	2022 FNC Kingdom "Star Station"	Chiba	Japan	Makuhari Messe Event Hall	
2022	December 18	2022 FNC Kingdom "Star Station"	Chiba	Japan	Makuhari Messe Event Hall	
2023	March 18	KCON 2023 Thailand	Bangkok	Thailand	IMPACT Arena	
2023	April 8	Music Bank in Paris	Paris	France	Paris La Defense Arena	
2023	April 30	Seoul Festa 2023 'K-POP Super Live'	Seoul	South Korea	Jamsil Arena	
2023	May 19	K.One Festa Qatar 2023	Lusail	Qatar	Lusail Stadium	
2023	November 8	KBS Korea On Stage London	London	United Kingdom	OVO Arena Wembley	
2023	December 16	2023 FNC Kingdom — The Greatest Show	Chiba	Japan	Makuhari Messe Event Hall	
2023	December 17	2023 FNC Kingdom — The Greatest Show	Chiba	Japan	Makuhari Messe Event Hall	
2024	May 10	KCON 2024 Japan	Chiba	Japan	ZOZO Marine Stadium	
2024	May 11	KCON 2024 Japan	Chiba	Japan	ZOZO Marine Stadium	
2024	December 14	2024 FNC Kingdom - SING SING SING	Chiba	Japan	Makuhari Messe Event Hall	
2024	December 15	2024 FNC Kingdom - SING SING SING	Chiba	Japan	Makuhari Messe Event Hall	
2025	March 1	2025 Idol Radio Live in Macau	Macau		The Venetian Arena	
2025	March 2	2025 Idol Radio Live in Macau	Macau		The Venetian Arena	
2025	August 1	KCON LA 2025	Los Angeles	United States	Crypto.com Arena	
