= Strong Baby =

2008 single by Big Bang

Single by BigBang

from the album Remember
- Language: Korean; Japanese
- Released: November 5, 2008
- Recorded: 2008
- Genre: EDM
- Length: 3:43
- Label: YG
- Songwriter: G-Dragon
- Producers: G-Dragon, JR Groove

BigBang singles chronology
"Sunset Glow" (2008)	"Strong Baby" (2008)	"My Heaven" (2009)

Music video
- "Strong Baby" on YouTube

"Strong Baby" is a song recorded by South Korean boy band Big Bang. Released on November 5, 2008, through YG Entertainment, the song’s music video released later on January 1st 2009. It served as the second single from the trio's second studio album Remember (2008). While the previous single "Sunset Glow" was promoted with all members, "Strong Baby" was performed solely by former member Seungri, formerly the youngest member of the group.

== Background ==
While "Sunset Glow" was promoted with the entire group, Seungri performed "Strong Baby" independently. In order to shed the "youngest member" image from BigBang, he promoted the single with a more mature look complete with a stylised dance. He later received the triple crown on Korean music show Inkigayo. The song was later included in the Japanese version of Seungri's second extended play Let's Talk About Love (2013).

== Track listing ==
No.	Title	Lyrics	Music	Arrangement	Length
1.	"Strong Baby"	G-Dragon	G-Dragon, JR Groove	JR Groove	3:43
