= Champagne and Roses Tour =

2023–24 concert tour by Ne-Yo

- World tour by Ne-Yo
- Associated album: Self Explanatory
- Start date: September 9, 2023
- End date: November 10, 2024

Champagne and Roses Tour was a worldwide concert tour by American singer Ne-Yo, in support of his studio album Self Explanatory. The tour began on September 9, 2023, in Sterling Heights, Michigan, in the United States, and ended on November 10, 2024, in Kuala Lumpur, Malaysia.

== Tour dates ==
List of 2023 concerts
Date	City	Country	Venue
September 9	Sterling Heights	United States	Michigan Lottery Amphitheatre
September 10	Indianapolis	United States	Everwise Amphitheatre
September 13	Cuyahoga Falls	United States	Blossom Music Center
September 14	Saratoga Springs	United States	Saratoga Performing Arts Center
September 15	Gilford	United States	BankNH Pavilion
September 17	Philadelphia	United States	TD Pavilion
September 18	Hartford	United States	Xfinity Theatre
September 20	Charlotte	United States	Metro Credit Union Amphitheatre
September 22	Jacksonville	United States	Daily's Place
September 23	Atlanta	United States	Cadence Bank Amphitheatre
September 24	East Lake-Orient Park	United States	MidFlorida Credit Union Amphitheatre
September 27	Dallas	United States	Dos Equis Pavilion
September 29	Sugar Land	United States	Smart Financial Centre
October 3	Chula Vista	United States	North Island Credit Union Amphitheatre
October 4	Mountain View	United States	Shoreline Amphitheatre

List of 2024 concerts
Date	City	Country	Venue
March 2	Brussels	Belgium	Forest National
March 3	Tilburg	Netherlands	013
March 5	Paris	France	Zénith Paris
March 7	Manchester	England	AO Arena
March 8	Leeds	England	First Direct Arena
March 9	Cardiff	Wales	International Arena
March 11	Newcastle	England	Newcastle Arena
March 13	London	England	The O2 Arena
March 14	Birmingham	England	Resorts World Arena
March 15	Birmingham	England	Resorts World Arena
March 16	London	England	The O2 Arena
March 18	Glasgow	Scotland	OVO Hydro
March 19	Manchester	England	AO Arena
March 22	Dublin	Ireland	3Arena
March 23	Paris	France	Accor Arena
March 24	Amsterdam	Netherlands	Ziggo Dome
June 15	Turin	Italy	Inalpi Arena
June 16	Berlin	Germany	Velodrom
June 17	Düsseldorf	Germany	Mitsubishi Electric Halle
June 19	Munich	Germany	Zenith
June 20	Zurich	Switzerland	The Hall
June 25	Hamburg	Germany	Alsterdorfer Sporthalle
June 27	Copenhagen	Denmark	Royal Arena
June 28	Oslo	Norway	Oslo Spektrum
June 29	Stockholm	Sweden	Hovet
September 19	São Paulo	Brazil	Espaço Unimed
September 26	Melbourne	Australia	Rod Laver Arena
September 28	Adelaide	Australia	Adelaide Entertainment Centre
September 29	Perth	Australia	Perth Arena
October 2	Brisbane	Australia	Brisbane Entertainment Centre
October 3	Sydney	Australia	Qudos Bank Arena
October 5	Auckland	New Zealand	Spark Arena
October 8	Quezon City	Philippines	Araneta Coliseum
October 9	Quezon City	Philippines	Araneta Coliseum
October 11	Hong Kong	China	AXA X Wonderland
October 16	Seoul	South Korea	Hwajeong Tiger Dome
October 23	Bangkok	Thailand	Impact Arena
October 30	Jakarta	Indonesia	Jakarta International Expo
November 6	Singapore		The Star Performing Arts Centre
November 7	Singapore		The Star Performing Arts Centre
November 9	Kuala Lumpur	Malaysia	Plenary Hall
November 10	Kuala Lumpur	Malaysia	Plenary Hall
