= New Creation Church =

Megachurch in Singapore

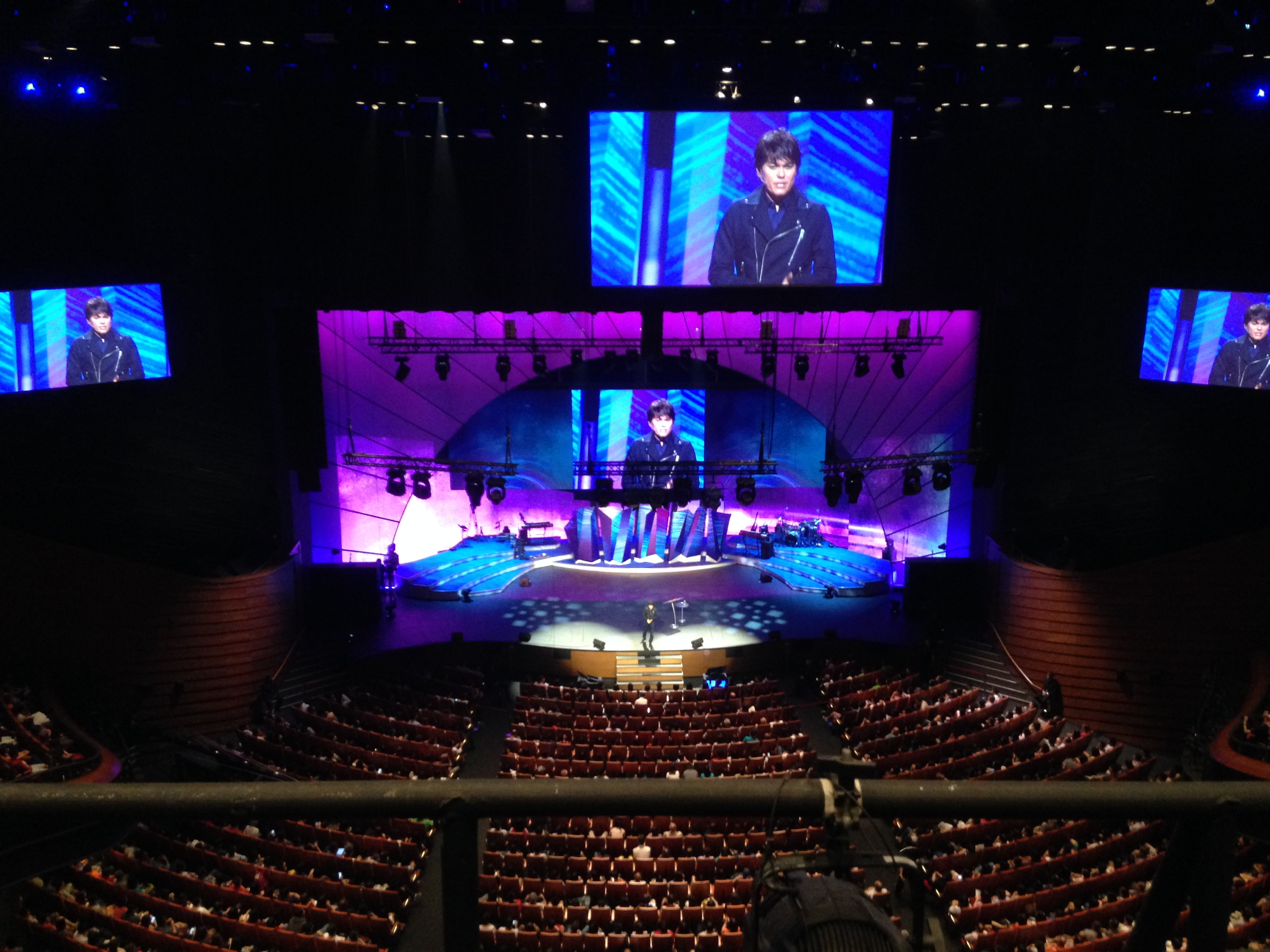
- Church service at The Star Performing Arts Centre in 2015
- Location: The Star Performing Arts Centre, one-north
- Country: Singapore
- Denomination: Non-denominational, Charismatic
- Website: www.newcreation.org.sg

History
- Founded: 1984

Specifications
- Capacity: 5,000 seats

New Creation Church (abbreviation: NCC) is a non-denominational Charismatic Christian megachurch in Singapore. Founded in 1984, it holds church services at The Star Performing Arts Centre. It is a member of the National Council of Churches of Singapore (NCCS). New Creation Church also manages a business arm, Rock Productions Pte Ltd, which owns and operates a performing arts centre and shopping mall, The Star, and a travel agency, Omega Tours & Travel.

The church was one of three megachurches to make it to a list of Singapore's 10 largest charities, according to a report by The Straits Times in 2019. The senior pastor of the church is Joseph Prince.

== History ==
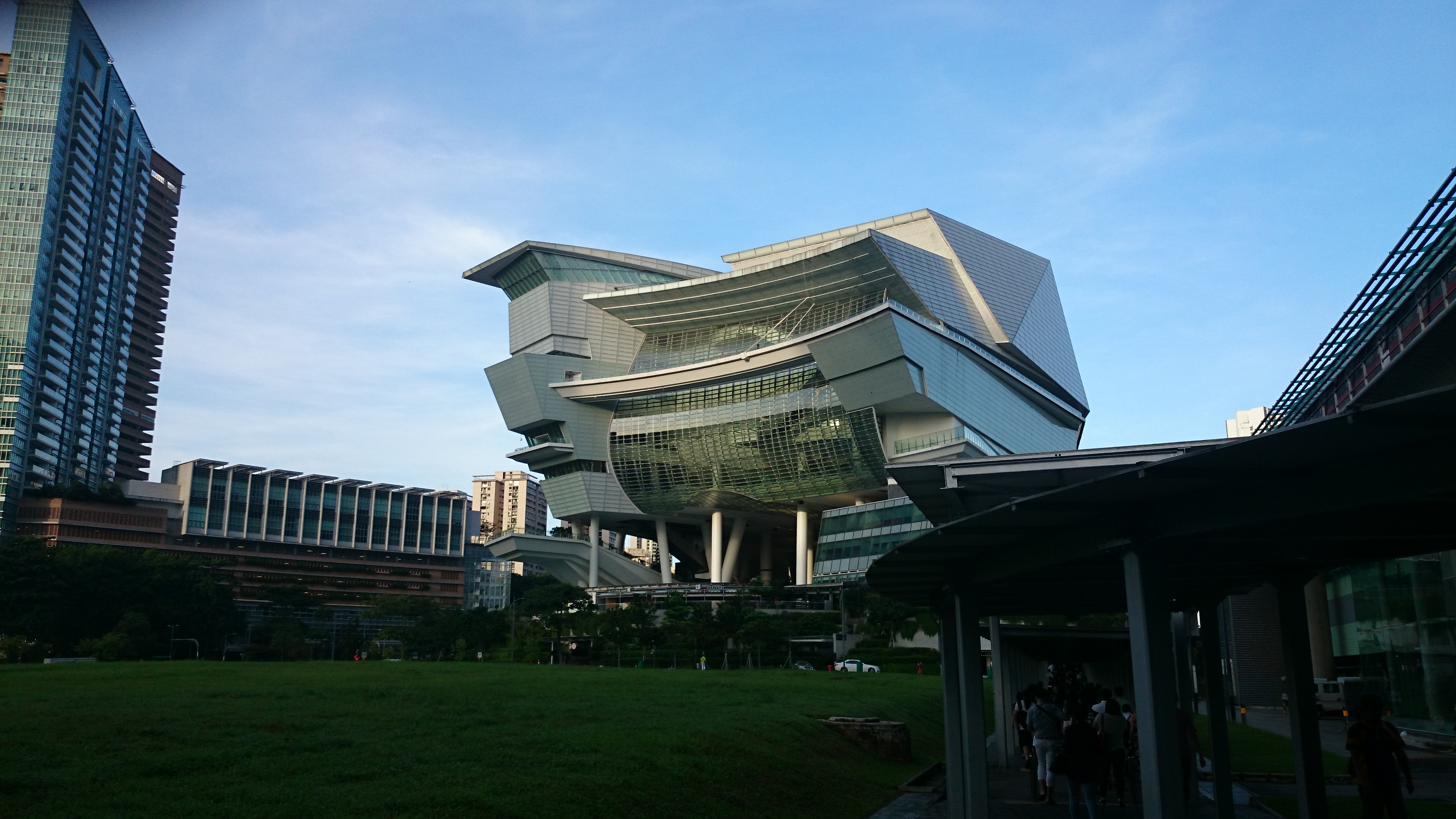
The Star Performing Arts Centre, where the NCC conducts its church service

The church was founded by a small group including Joseph Prince, Henry Yeo, David Yeow and Jack Ho in 1983. It was later officially registered with the Registrar of Societies in October 1984. It began its Sunday service with an average attendance of 25 people. Gradually, it grew to about 150 members in 1990 when Prince was appointed as the senior pastor of the church.

During the period between 1984 and 1999, the church used different worship venues such as a hall within the premises of the Young Women's Christian Association of Singapore and the ballrooms in local hotels to accommodate its growing congregation.

In 1999, the church moved to the Rock Auditorium in Suntec City. On 23 December 2012, its services were shifted to The Star Performing Arts Centre.

== Worship venue ==
The church moved to a new 5,000 seat theatre, now its main worship venue, at The Star Performing Arts Centre in one-north on 23 December 2012.

Officially opened on 1 November 2012, The Star PAC spans levels 3 to 11, known as the civic and cultural zone, of the building called The Star. It is owned and managed by Rock Productions, the business arm of the church. The Star PAC comprises a 5,000-seat theatre, a multi-purpose hall, an outdoor amphitheatre, special function rooms and other facilities. The church rents The Star PAC for Sunday services.

== Business arm ==
New Creation Church's business arm, Rock Productions Pte Ltd, owns and manages The Star and Omega Tours & Travel.

The Star is a 15-storey mixed use complex located in one-north, Singapore, integrating a performing arts centre called The Star Performing Arts Centre, and a shopping mall called The Star Vista. The building was designed by Andrew Bromberg of the architectural firm Aedas, and cost S$500 million to develop. The Star Performing Arts Centre is used as the church service venue for New Creation Church.

The Star Vista is a shopping mall occupying three floors in The Star, and was developed by CapitaLand. In November 2019, Rock Productions Pte Ltd acquired The Star Vista for S$296 million from CapitaLand, after CapitaLand was purportedly in talks with buyers for a potential sale. New Creation Church explained that the acquisition was necessary "to protect the interest of the church", citing concerns of buyers with interests conflicting with the church's use of The Star PAC for religious purposes.

Omega Tours & Travel Pte Ltd is a travel agency that specialises in package and private tours to Holy Land destinations in Israel, Jordan, Turkey and Greece. Pastor Joseph Prince has been known to be featured in high-profile Holy Land tours speaking alongside other prominent pastors such as Joel Osteen.

== Controversies ==
=== Adam Lambert's performance at The Star Performing Arts Centre ===
In May 2013, the National Council of Churches of Singapore (NCCS) said it was looking into a complaint about singer Adam Lambert performing at The Star Performing Arts Centre, a commercial entity fully owned by Rock Productions, the business arm of New Creation Church. Lim K. Tham, general secretary of the council said it had received a complaint that "the gay lifestyle may be promoted at the concert", a reference to Lambert's homosexuality, and that "The NCCS has conveyed this concern to New Creation so that it can make a response."

In a statement, the church said that according to stipulations from the authorities before the tender was awarded to Rock Productions, the venue had to operate "on a purely commercial basis and will not implement any leasing or pricing policies that will discriminate between religious groups, institutions or organisations from hiring the venue". The church said all public events require a public entertainment licence from the police, and it had "utmost confidence" in the policies and ability of government bodies such as the Media Development Authority to "protect the interest of the general public". The statement added that any event at the performing arts centre "should not be misconstrued or misunderstood" as the church "approving of its artistic presentation or endorsing the lifestyle of the performer".

=== Pastor Mocking Taoist beliefs ===
On 15 June 2010, Pastor Mark of the church gave a sermon mocking Taoist beliefs.

== See also ==
- Christianity in Singapore
- Evangelism
- Nondenominational Christianity
