= Seungri =

South Korean former singer-songwriter (born 1990)

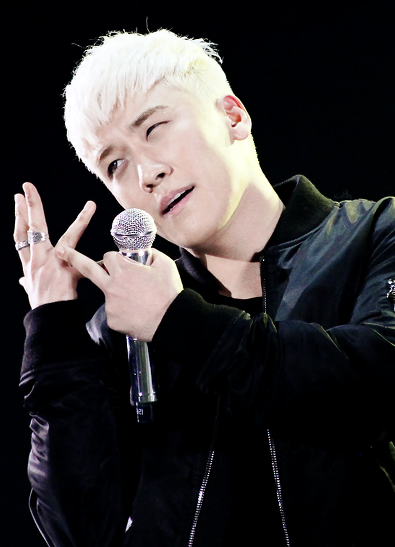
- Seungri in 2015
- Born: Lee Seung-hyun; December 12, 1990 (age 35); Gwangju, South Korea
- Other name: V.I (Note: Used in Japan only)
- Education: Gukje Digital University
- Occupations: Singer-songwriter; actor; businessman
- Criminal information
- Organization: Burning Sun
- Status: Released on February 9, 2023; 3 years ago
- Convictions: habitual gambling; embezzlement
- Penalty: 3 years imprisonment; commuted to 18 months (Served 17 months and 28 days)

Details
- Date apprehended: August 12, 2021; 5 years ago
- Imprisoned at: Yeoju Prison
- Musical career
- Genres: K-pop; electropop
- Instruments: Vocals; piano
- Years active: 2006–2019
- Labels: YG; Natural High; YGX
- Formerly of: BigBang; YG Family

Korean name
- Hangul: 이승현
- RR: I Seunghyeon
- MR: I Sŭnghyŏn

Stage name
- Hangul: 승리
- RR: Seungri
- MR: Sŭngni

Signature
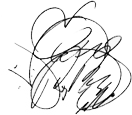

Lee Seung-hyun (Korean: 이승현; born December 12, 1990), better known by the stage names Seungri (승리) and V.I, is a South Korean former singer-songwriter and was a member of the South Korean boy band BigBang formed by YG Entertainment. A key figure of the Burning Sun scandal, he was convicted in 2020 for prostitution mediation and embezzlement.

In the mid-2000s, Seungri rose to prominence as a member of the South Korean boy band BigBang. With the release of the group's second studio album Remember (2008), which included a solo performance by Seungri, he began to adopt a more mature image as an artist. Seungri furthered this image with the release of his chart-topping EP, V.V.I.P (2011). It yielded two singles: "VVIP" and "What Can I Do" (Korean: 어쩌라고; RR: Eojjeorago). His second Korean EP Let's Talk About Love (2013) fared better, becoming his second number one album with 80,000 copies sold. It was supported by "Gotta Talk to You" (Korean: 할말 있어요; RR: Halmal isseoyo), which was later re-released in Japan as his first full Japanese studio album, with re-recordings of his previous songs in Japanese. He then released his first Korean studio album, The Great Seungri (2018). Outside of music, he made his theatrical debut with the musical Sonagi in 2008 and went on to star in films such as Nineteen (2009) and Why Did You Come to My House? (2009). He started in television with the Japanese drama Kindaichi Shonen no Jikenbo (2013) and the South Korean television series Angel Eyes (2014).

On March 11, 2019, Seungri departed from BigBang and retired from the entertainment industry after allegations that he provided sex workers for investors in his business ventures. He was charged with sexual bribery and embezzlement, and convicted in 2020 after the police investigation of the Burning Sun scandal. The military trial of Seungri began on September 16, 2020, during his mandatory military service in South Korea. He denied 7 of the 8 charges against him. The military court found Seungri guilty on all charges and sentenced him to three years of imprisonment and a fine of ₩1.15 billion (US$970,000) on August 12, 2021, which was reduced to 18 months on January 27, 2022, based on his admission of guilt. During the sentence reduction, Seungri pleaded guilty to all charges brought against him and expressed that he "will reflect on his actions". He was released from prison on February 9, 2023.

== Early life and education ==
Seungri was born and raised in Gwangju, South Korea.

After passing his college entrance exams, Seungri was accepted by Chung-Ang University and began his college education in the spring of 2010, along with Yuri and Sooyoung of Girls' Generation. He dropped out of Chung-Ang University in 2012 after being placed on academic probation several times due to his demanding schedule with BigBang, opting instead to enroll at Gukje Digital University so he could take online classes and attend his schedules at the same time.

== Career ==
=== Early beginnings and debut with Big Bang ===
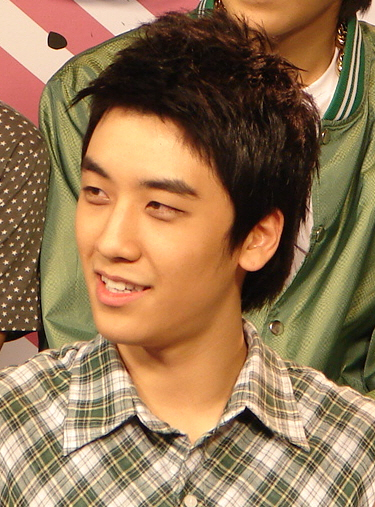
Seungri at the TV show Fast Forward in Thailand in December 2007

Seungri was noted for his dancing skills growing up, with the singer participating in the dance group II Hwa. Hoping to pursue a career in the entertainment industry, Seungri appeared in survival program Let's Coke Play! Battle Shinhwa, a reality television series to find the next Shinhwa. He was eventually eliminated in the ninth episode. Following his appearance on the show, Seungri was scouted by YG Entertainment to audition for the new boy band, Big Bang, alongside five other members: The formation of the group was documented on television. Despite the initial plan of debuting six members, Seungri and Hyun-seung risked elimination due to their lack of stage presence and were given one final opportunity to impress Yang Hyun-suk, founder of YG Entertainment. Ultimately Seungri was chosen to stay, while Hyun-seung (who went on to debut with the boy band Beast) was dropped before the official debut.

Following the release of several single albums, BigBang's first album Big Bang Vol.1 – Since 2007 was a moderate success. Seungri also recorded his first solo song "The Next Day" (Korean: 다음날; RR: Daeumnal) for the album. The group's breakthrough came with the release of their first extended play, Always (2007), which included the number one song "Lies" (Korean: 거짓말; RR: Geojinmal). The song went on to top major Korean music charts for a record-breaking seven consecutive weeks,^{[3} and won the group the Song of the Year award at the 9th Mnet Korean Music Festival.^{[4} Their following EPs followed its predecessor's footsteps: Hot Issue yielded "Last Farewell" (Korean: 마지막 인사; RR: Majimang insa) while Stand Up spawned "Day by Day" (Korean: 하루하루; RR: Haruharu); both singles were chart-toppers. Seungri continued to hone his dancing skills by competing against bandmate Taeyang in several dance competitions, as well as against Super Junior's Eunhyuk, TVXQ's Yunho and Shinee's Taemin. He also choreographed a large portion of BigBang's dances.

=== 2008–2011: Solo career development, acting, and VVIP ===
In 2008, members of BigBang began branching out to develop their solo careers. Seungri became the first member of BigBang to act in a musical with Sonagi in 2008. He also ventured into hosting, becoming a host for MBC's music program Show! Music Core alongside Daesung. After filming wrapped up, Seungri went back into the studio with BigBang to record for their second Korean studio album, Remember (2008). The album was promoted with two singles: "Sunset Glow" (Korean: 붉은노을; RR: Bulgeunnoeul) and "Strong Baby", a solo release by Seungri. In order to shed the "youngest member" image from BigBang, he promoted the single with a more mature look complete with a stylized dance. He won his first triple crown for "Strong Baby" on SBS's live music show Inkigayo.

When promotional activities for Remember ended, Seungri returned to acting and starred in his first film Why Did You Come to My House?, playing the love interest of Kang Hye-jung. He then starred in his second musical Shouting, alongside bandmate Daesung, who was unable to perform at the last minute due to a car accident. The same year, he also starred in the film 19-Nineteen alongside fellow member T.O.P.

Seungri's first extended play, V.V.I.P, was released on January 20, 2011, with two singles: "VVIP" and "What Can I Do". To establish an identity away from BigBang through his music, Seungri involved himself in the production of the album, composing and writing six out of the seven songs. "VVIP" and "What Can I Do" won a triple crown on Mnet's M! Countdown. Seungri also won the SBS Inkigayo Mutizen Award. Promotional activities were cut short in order for Seungri to focus on BigBang's comeback. The same year, he was cast in the MBC drama Lights and Shadows, playing an aspiring singer from the country.

=== 2012–2014: Japanese promotions, scandal controversy, and Let's Talk About Love ===
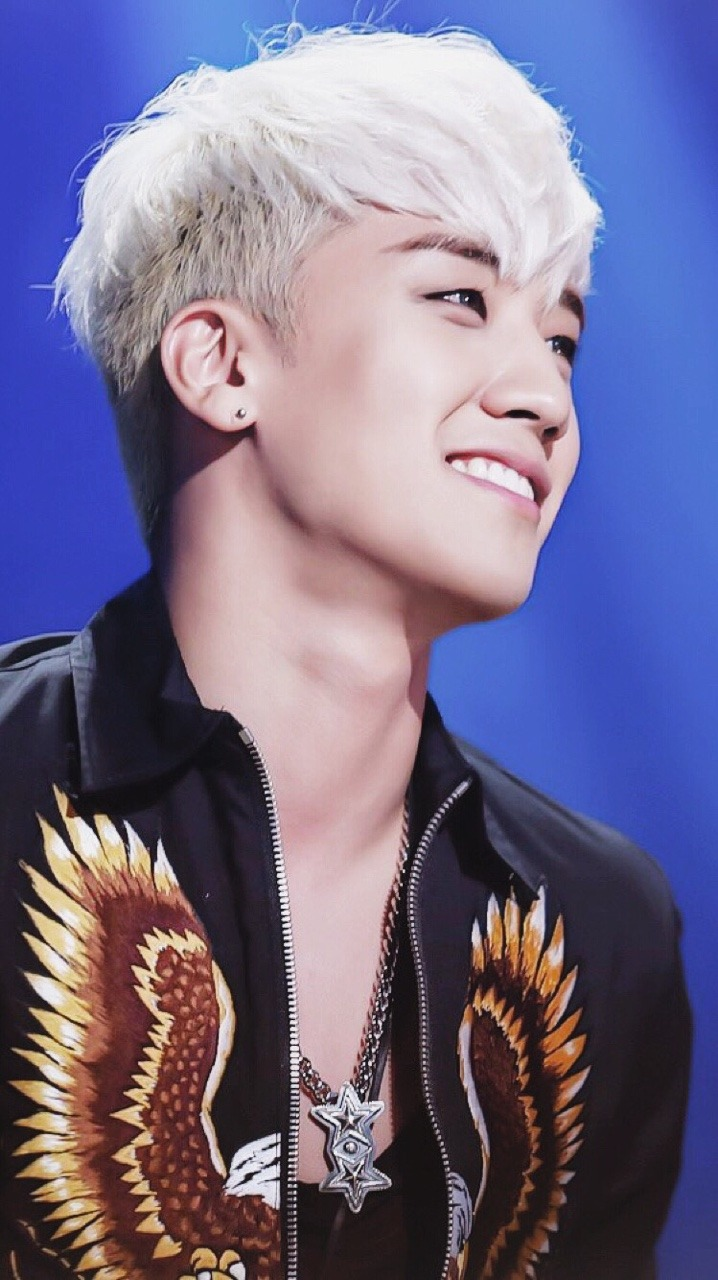
Seungri in 2015

In 2012, Seungri started his first Japanese promotions by appearing on variety shows, such as hosting a Japanese radio program entitled Big Bang's All Night Nippon. He was also chosen as the special MC on Fuji TV's Sakigake! Ongaku Banzuke Eight, where he interviewed celebrities. He appeared in his first Japanese show Seungchan's Complete Victory Declaration on Space Shower TV. Seungri later appeared in the Nihon TV special drama Kindaichi Shonen no Jikenbo to celebrate the 60th anniversary of the Japanese broadcasting company, NTV. The drama was based on the manga Kindaichi Case Files Neo SP 1: Hong Kong Kowloon Treasure Murder Case, and premiered in January 2013. It later won the Best Drama SP (Excellence Awards) at the Tokyo Drama Awards. He also became a regular cast of Music On! TV's program Count Down E.T, hosting the Men's Bar Food section.

Seungri's career took a setback when he became embroiled in a sex scandal with a Japanese woman. As a result, he stepped out of BigBang's promotional activities for self-reflection. He would revisit the scandal one year later on SBS talk show Incarnation, discussing how it helped him grow up and how fans began to view him more as an adult.

Recording for Seungri's second Korean EP Let's Talk About Love took over two years, and the artist also involved himself with the production of the album. The EP was released in August 2013, debuting at number one on the Gaon Chart and went on to sell over 70,000 copies. He promoted the singles "Gotta Talk to You" and the eponymous title track. In October of the same year, he released his first Japanese album, selling over 14,000 copies in its first day and topping the Oricon Charts. The album contained songs from his previous albums, as well as the new song "The Feelings Painted in the Sky" (Japanese: 空に描く思い), which was later used as the theme song for Seungri's first Japanese television drama Yubikoi ～Kimini Okuru Message～.

In September, Seungri joined Popular Women 100 as a co-host alongside comedian Hiroshi Yamazaki, becoming the first international celebrity to clinch a hosting spot on a regular cable show in Japan.

From 2013 to 2014, Seungri starred in the Japanese drama Yubikoi ~Kimini Okuru Message~ - A Message Send To You. He then took a supporting role in the Korean medical drama Angel Eyes alongside labelmate Ku Hye-sun, playing the role of a Korean-American teen with the dream of becoming an emergency rescue worker.

=== 2015–2019: Focus on acting, The Great Seungri, tour and other activities ===
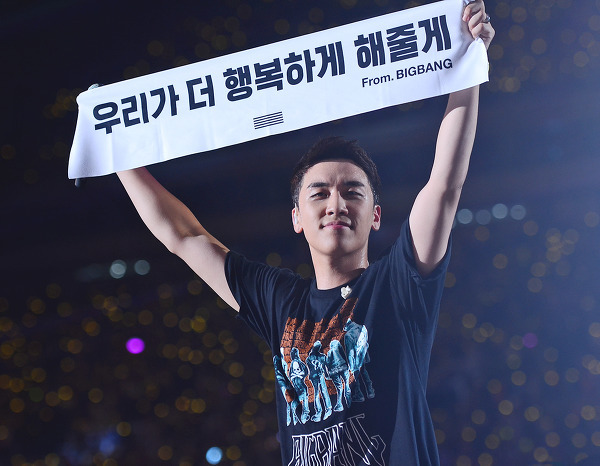
Seungri at Big Bang's 0.TO.10 concert in Seoul, 2016

Though he toured extensively from 2015 to 2016 with his band to promote their third Korean album Made (2016), Seungri also appeared as a professional judge on the Chinese TV program Girls Fighting in 2016, where he mentored trainees. He also produced the song "36 Tricks of Love" for the show, a remake of the Taiwanese singer Jolin Tsai's song under the same title. The song took the number one spot on the QQ Music and Weibo charts in China. He later starred in the Japanese movie, High & Low: The Movie (2016), playing the son of a Korean mob boss. The film was commercially successful and placed second at the Japanese box office on its opening, grossing ¥668.3 million. He also recorded the song "We Run Dis" with PKCZ for the soundtrack. In August 2016, he started filming for his first Chinese film Bonjour L'amour (also titled Love Only). The movie was released on March 2, 2018.

In May 2018, Seungri announced his first solo tour The Great Seungri, twelve years after his debut, with shows announced in South Korea and Japan to support his first studio album. On July 20, 2018, Seungri released his first Korean studio album The Great Seungri, with "1, 2, 3!" and "Where R U From" as its lead singles. Seungri was highly involved in the production of the album, co-composing and writing for all tracks. The album debuted at number one on South Korea's Gaon Chart. Meanwhile, Seungri was featured on the single "Combo" by TPA, with Al Rocco and Ivy. Seungri was featured on the single "Ignite" by K-391, he was featured along with Alan Walker and Julie Bergan. The song topped the Norwegian chart for two weeks.

Seungri also starred in YG and Netflix's sitcom-variety show, YG Future Strategy Office, playing a fictionalised version of himself appointed as senior adviser to the fictional division of YG Entertainment. The show premiered in October 2018. In November of that same year, he joined the variety show We Will Channel You as a regular cast member.

== Legal issues and controversies ==
=== Allegations and departure from YG ===
In 2019, a number of allegations related to club Burning Sun, a nightclub founded in 2018 and managed by two CEOs; Lee Moon-ho and Lee Seong-hyun surrounded the singer Seungri due to his affiliation with the business as a creative director/shareholder and occasional DJ. The allegations included drug use and arranging sexual favors for investors, among others. Media also shared KakaoTalk conversations with messages allegedly shared between the singer and Burning Sun employees about such arrangements in relation to the prostitution allegation, but during a press conference on March 4 the police revealed that the original unedited KakaoTalk messages were not submitted. However, Seungri denied the allegations and journalists later admitted that they manipulated some of the chats, presenting some private conversations as part of group chats. On March 10, Seungri underwent a second round of drug analysis; hair and urine samples were tested, and the results were negative. On March 11, 2019, Seungri announced on his Instagram account his retirement from the entertainment industry, stating that the criticism and hate he received in the past month had driven him to this move in order to protect BigBang and YG Entertainment. He also stated that he would fully cooperate with the investigation. This led to the consensual termination of his contract with his agency YG Entertainment on March 13.

=== Arrest warrants ===
On April 1, the Seoul Metropolitan Police Agency reported that Seungri and his business partner Yoo In-seok (co-CEO of Yuri Holdings) embezzled funds from Yuri Holdings for business purposes. The amount was reported to be about tens of millions of won (₩10 million ≈ US$8,400). On April 25, Seungri denied the prostitution charges related to a 2015 Christmas party, while Yoo In-seok admitted that he called and paid for entertainers for Japanese investors. The hotel bill was reportedly paid using a YG Entertainment corporate card, however Seungri denied knowing about the occurrence of prostitution.

On May 8, after a total of 17 closed-door police interrogations, the Seoul Metropolitan Police Agency requested an arrest warrant for Seungri over the following charges: prostitution mediation, embezzlement of Burning Sun funds (according to the police, Seungri directly intervened in the misappropriation of about 200M Won from Burning Sun as brand fee for Monkey Museum, a bar owned by Seungri), and violation of the Food Sanitation Act (related to Monkey Museum wrongfully registering business). On May 14, Seoul District Court rejected the arrest warrant saying that embezzlement, a major charge, was open to dispute, and that it was difficult to certify the reasons for detention have been met, such as the destruction of evidence, for the remaining suspicions which included prostitution mediation. In addition, the court's reason for rejection included prosecution's inability to show the existence and scope of criminal liability of Seungri. On May 15, police stated that it would be difficult to reapply for arrest warrant, and they would finalize the investigation prior to Seungri's military enlistment date.

However, on June 25, the police stated that his case has been forwarded to prosecution with seven charges: procuring sex service, prostitution mediation, embezzlement of business funds for hiring a legal representative, embezzlement of club Burning Sun revenues, attempt at destruction of evidence, distribution of illegally-filmed content via social platforms, and violation of the Food Sanitation Act. On August 28, 2019, Seungri was additionally questioned in connection with illegal gambling. On January 10, 2020, the prosecution announced they had requested a second arrest warrant for Seungri on seven charges. The arrest warrant was again denied, with the court saying that detention didn't seem necessary considering his attitude towards the investigation and not meeting reasons for detention.

=== Trial ===
Seungri enlisted in the military on March 9, 2020, and his case was transferred to the military court. His trial started on September 16, consisting in eight charges. Seungri denied all charges except one, violation of the Foreign Exchange Transactions Act, for which he stated he was deeply reflecting on his mistake.

Regarding the allegations related to prostitution (prostitution mediation and prostitution for self), Seungri's lawyer stated that Seungri had no reason to mediate prostitution and that he didn't recall having sexual intercourse with the woman in question, who he thought was just a person who wanted to meet him. During the trial, the witnesses confirmed that it was Yoo In-Seok who ordered prostitution, not Seungri.

Regarding the charge of distributing obscene material, Seungri's defense stated that he only shared with friends a photo that was not taken by him, but was sent to him from an entertainment bar.

For the charge of habitual gambling, Seungri's lawyer answered that Seungri didn't gamble as a habit, and that he visited the U.S. for work and not purposely for gambling. Habitual gambling is illegal but not gambling for momentary pleasure.

The charge of embezzlement is divided in two different charges, for which Seungri's side declared that Seungri had no motive or intent to commit embezzlement. Seungri's charges also include Violation of Food Sanitation Act (for inappropriately declaring Monkey Museum as a restaurant instead of an entertainment establishment).

On January 14, the prosecution added the charge of eliciting violence against Seungri. In 2015, a drunk customer in a bar entered into the private room of Seungri and his acquaintances: the prosecution claimed that after an argument, Seungri called Yoo In-Seok who involved gang members into the argument to threaten the man. The prosecution claimed Seungri conspired with Yoo thus charging him as instigating co-conspirator. However, Seungri claimed that he didn't have anything to do with the gangsters, and during the 15th hearing one of the alleged victims said that he didn't feel threatened at the time, while the other one stated that he didn't know at all that Seungri could be related to the incident.

The trial also encountered an issue related to confirmation bias: on March 25, 2021, after the 13th hearing for Seungri's trial, a witness claimed that the police had written up a statement against Seungri that he actually never made. Prosecution's other witnesses also claimed that the investigators put pressure on them in giving false testimonies, probably due to the pressure from media and public to find Seungri guilty. Many of the witnesses also claimed that the prosecution slightly changed their answers or seemed to have designed questioning with the target of arriving at Seungri's name.

On August 12, 2021, Seungri was sentenced to a three-year prison term for nine charges, including prostitution mediation and overseas gambling. The military court also sought a fine of ₩1.15 billion (US$990,000), and immediate detention.

On January 27, 2022, after a final appeal at the South Korean High Court for Armed Forces, his prison sentence was reduced to 18 months. Seungri pleaded guilty to all charges brought against him. He also stated that he would reflect on his actions.

His sentence was upheld by the Supreme Court of Korea on May 26, 2022, whereupon Seungri was discharged from the military and transferred to a civilian prison to serve the remainder of his term.

On February 6, 2023, it was reported that Seungri would be released from prison on February 11. On February 9, 2023, Seungri was released from prison.

=== Special Violence ===
Gangnam Police Station accepted the criminal complaint against Seungri for special violence (violence with weapons involved). The complainant, a man in his 30s, claimed that he was violated by Seungri while eating at a restaurant. Seungri has claimed that the complainant demanded to sit with him while he was drunk, and that although it is true that he held up his bottle of alcohol while rejecting, he has not committed any violence.

== Other activities ==
=== Business ventures ===
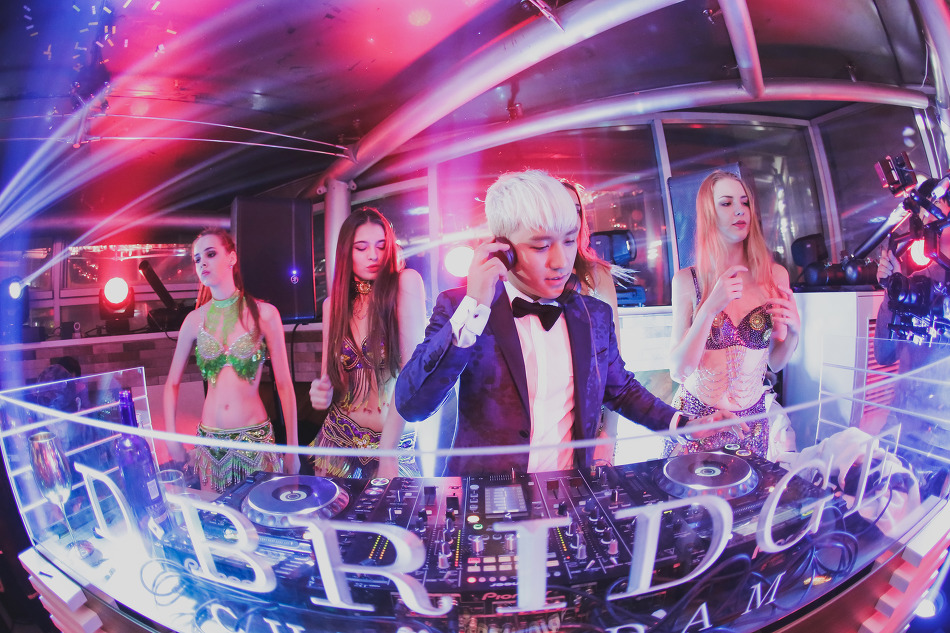
Seungri DJing at D-Bridge Lounge, Cheongdam, in 2015.

Seungri has helped establish two branches of a music and dance academy called "Plug In Music Academy," also known as "Seungri Academy". The dance academy is located in Gwangju, Daejeon, Mokpo, and Seoul. Students of the academy learn how to sing, dance, and act. Some of the past students of the academy include high-profile K-pop celebrities such as 2NE1's Minzy, BTS' J-Hope, Kara's Goo Hara, TVXQ's Yunho and B.A.P.'s Zelo.

In 2014, Seungri started a café business. Purchasing a license for traditional Belgian waffles, he opened a waffle café And Here at Daehangno which he left to his mother to run. Seungri opened his private bar called Monkey Museum night club in Changsha, Hunan, China in partnership with Luk Hing Entertainment. He also founded a record label Natural High Record alongside other DJs. In December 2016, he launched a Japanese ramen restaurant franchise called Aori Ramen in Seoul. During 2017, the franchise expanded through Asia, and in November, he announced that he would open the 15th branch in Kuala Lumpur. In early 2017, he invested in the medical cosmetic brand Dr. Gloderm, acquiring 10% of the cosmetic company's shares. Seungri now has a company name for all his investments under YURI HOLDINGS.

In 2018, Seungri was revealed to be collaborating with Liquid State, an electronic dance music label newly launched by Sony Music Entertainment and Tencent Music Entertainment. He would serve as the label's ambassador and be involved in music collaborations. In June, Seungri become the CEO of YGX, a label under YG Entertainment, Seungri will work on recruiting talented hip-hop rookies and running entertainment businesses. The label company was merged with Seungri's DJ label Natural High Record, it will also be in charge of HIGHGRND and a dance academy called YGX Academy. In 2019, he resigned from all management positions before his military enlistment, as required by Korean law.

=== Sports ===
In May 2015, FC MEN announced through their Instagram that Seungri would be joining their celebrity soccer club. He was given the forward position and the number 11.

Seungri, under the name Richard Lee, participated in his first jiu-jitsu match under the Japan Brazilian Jiu-Jitsu Federation in 2017. He won two medals, silver medal in adult white open-weight class and bronze medal for adult white featherweight class. He also earned a black belt in taekwondo.

=== Philanthropy ===
In 2015, Seungri joined label-mate Sean for a briquette charity. He had previously promised fans to deliver and donate 30,000 briquettes but donated a total of 130,000. He brought along notable celebrities to the charity, including F.T. Island's Choi Jong-hoon and Jung Joon-young of Drug Restaurant (formerly JJY).

In December 2017, Seungri, along with 30 Aori Ramen employees and his father, delivered coal briquettes to low-income families for cooking and heating their homes. He also donated 100 million won to global children welfare agency ChildFund Korea.

== Mandatory military service ==
Seungri was set to enlist in Nonsan Army Training Center on March 25, 2019, despite ongoing controversies regarding the Burning Sun scandal. Following the investigation, Seungri put in a request for the conscription delay, and the Military Manpower Administration granted a three-month postponement.

On March 9, 2020, Seungri enlisted in the military at the 6th Infantry Recruit Training Center in Cheorwon County, Gangwon Province. He did not answer any of the press' questions on his way to the training center.

On October 1, 2021, it was reported that the verdict was not final while the trial was referred to the Court of Appeal. Seungri was subsequently suspended from military service.

On June 8, 2022, the Army Headquarters' Human Resources Division fired Seungri, who was sentenced to one year and six months in prison based on the Supreme Court verdict. He was transferred from the Military Prison in Icheon, Gyeonggi-do to the nearest civilian prison, Yeoju Prison.

== Discography ==
- The Great Seungri (2018)

== Filmography ==
=== Film ===
Year	Film	Role
2009	Nineteen	Park Min-seo
2009	Why Did You Come to My House?	Park Ji-min
2016	Big Bang Made	Himself
2016	High & Low: The Movie	Lee
2018	Love Only	Winson / Yun Sheng

=== Television series ===
Year	Title	Role
2010	Haru	Cameo
2011	Lights and Shadows	Ahn Jae-su (cameo, ep 9–10)
2013	Kindaichi Shonen no Jikenbo (The Files of Young Kindaichi - Lost in Kowloon)	Kim Yong-dong
2013–2014	Yubikoi ~Kimini Okuru Message~ - A Message Send To You	Han Seung-ho
2014	Angel Eyes	Teddy Seo

=== Musical ===
Year	Title	Role
2008	Sonagi	
2009	Shouting! (소리쳐!)	

=== Variety show ===
Year	Title	Role	Other
2008–2009	Show! Music Core	Co-host	with Daesung
2010	Enjoy Today	Host	
2012	Seung-chan's Complete Victory Declaration	Cast member	Reality show
2013	Count Down E.T - Men's Bar Food	Regular cast	
2013	Popular Women 100	Co-host	with Hiroshi Yamazaki
2016	Girls Fighting	Instructor	
2017	Run, BIGBANG Scout!	Cast Member	
2017–2018	MIXNINE	Judge	
2018	YG Future Strategy Office	Main cast	
2018	We Will Channel You	Cast Member	

== Awards and nominations ==
Year	Award	Category	Nominated work	Result	Ref.
2009	3rd The Musical Awards	Popularity Award	Himself	Won	
2013	15th Mnet Asian Music Awards	Best Dance Performance - Male Solo	"Gotta Talk To U"	Nominated	
2018	1st MBC Plus X Genie Music Awards	Artist of the Year	Himself	Nominated	
2018	1st MBC Plus X Genie Music Awards	Male Artist Award	Himself	Nominated	
2018	1st MBC Plus X Genie Music Awards	Genie Music Popularity Award	Himself	Nominated	
2018	20th Mnet Asian Music Awards	Song of the Year	"1, 2, 3!"	Nominated	
2018	20th Mnet Asian Music Awards	Best Dance Performance	"1, 2, 3!"	Nominated	
2018	2nd Korea China International Film Festival	Hallyu Star Award	Himself	Won	
2018	10th MelOn Music Awards	Best Dance Track - Male	"1, 2, 3!"	Nominated	
2018	12th SBS Entertainment Awards	Scene Stealer Award	Himself	Won	
2019	28th Seoul Music Awards	Main Award	Himself	Nominated	
2019	28th Seoul Music Awards	Popularity Award	Himself	Nominated	
2019	28th Seoul Music Awards	K-Wave Award	Himself	Nominated	
2019	2018 Spellemannprisen	Song of the Year	"Ignite"	Nominated	

== Tours ==
- The Great Seungri (2018)
