= V.V.I.P =

2011 EP by Seungri

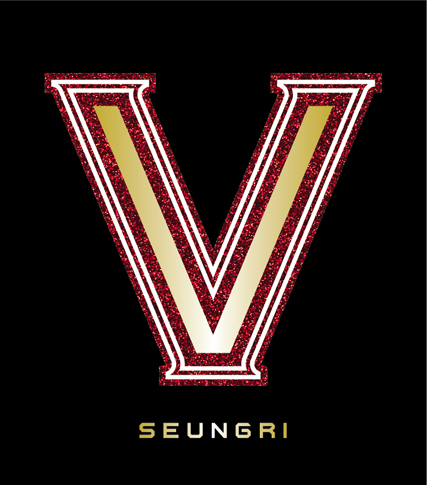

EP by Seungri
- Released: January 20, 2011
- Recorded: 2010
- Genre: R&B; pop; dance-pop
- Length: 23:27
- Label: YG
- Producer: Seungri; P.K

Seungri chronology
V.V.I.P (2011)	Let's Talk About Love (2013)

Singles from V.V.I.P
- 1. "VVIP" Released: January 20, 2011; 2. "What Can I Do?" Released: January 20, 2011

V.V.I.P is the debut extended play (EP) by Korean singer Seungri, member of Big Bang. The album debuted at number one on the South Korean music charts. It eventually became the fourth best-selling album by a Korean male artist in 2011.

Seungri wrote and produced 6 out of 7 songs in the album, along with creating the choreography for the title song. Two singles were released from the album, with music videos produced for both, "VVIP" and "What Can I Do?". The two songs combined won five number-one trophies on South Korean music shows.

== Track listing ==
No.	Title	Lyrics	Music	Arrangement	Length
1.	"VVIP"	Seungri	P.K, Dee. P	P.K, Dee. P	3:37
2.	"What Can I Do?" (어쩌라고; Eojjeolago)	Seungri	Seungri, Bigtone, P.K	P.K	3:38
3.	"Open The Window" (featuring G-Dragon; 창문을 열어; Changmun-eul yeol-eo)	G-Dragon, P.K	P.K	P.K	3:36
4.	"Magic"	Seungri	Seungri, Choice37	Choice37	3:20
5.	"I Know" (featuring IU)	Seungri	Seungri, P.K, Dee. P	P.K	3:26
6.	"White Love"	Seungri	Seungri, P.K	P.K	3:44
7.	"Outro (In My World)"	Seungri	Seungri, P.K	P.K	2:03
Total length:					23:27

== Charts ==
Chart (2011)	Peak position
South Korean Weekly Albums (Gaon)	1
South Korean Yearly Albums (Gaon)	34

== Sales ==
Chart	Sales
Japan	2,114
South Korea	48,682

== Music program awards ==
Song	Program	Date
"V.V.I.P"	M Countdown (Mnet)	January 27, 2011
"What Can I Do"	M Countdown (Mnet)	February 3, 2011
"What Can I Do"	M Countdown (Mnet)	February 10, 2011
"What Can I Do"	Inkigayo (SBS)	February 6, 2011
"What Can I Do"	Inkigayo (SBS)	February 13, 2011

== See also ==
- Big Bang (South Korean band)
- YG Entertainment
