= Sunset Glow =

1988 single by Lee Moon-sae

Single by Lee Moon-sae

from the album Standing Under the Shade of a Roadside Tree
- Released: September 15, 1988
- Recorded: 1988
- Genre: Ballad; pop
- Length: 3:45
- Label: King Records
- Songwriter: Lee Yeong-hun
- Producer: Lee Yeong-hun

"Sunset Glow" (Korean: 붉은 노을; RR: Bulgeun noeul) is a song recorded by South Korean singer Lee Moon-sae. It was released on September 15, 1988, as a single for his fifth studio album Standing Under the Shade of a Roadside Tree (가로수 그늘 아래 서면). The lyrics and music were composed by Lee Young-hoon.

== Background and release ==
"Sunset Glow" was originally recorded by Lee Moon-sae for his fifth studio album Standing Under the Shade of a Roadside Tree, which was released under King Records on September 15, 1988. It was written by Lee Yeong-hun and was included on side B of the album. The record was met with commercial success, selling over 2.58 million copies in South Korea. Choi Seong-chul of the Busan Ilbo wrote that the album "brought about a change in the perception of pop albums, which were relatively undervalued and priced low compared to foreign pop albums" in the country.

=== Other recordings ===
On December 17, 2004, Shinhwa released a remake album of hit songs from the 1980s and 1990s, titled Winter Story 2004–2005. A cover of the song titled "Red Sunset" was included on the record. Other artists who have recorded a cover of the song include BigBang, YB, Maya, Younha, Yurisangja, and MC Sniper.

== BigBang version ==
"Sunset Glow"

Single by BigBang

from the album Remember
- Language: Korean
- Released: November 5, 2008
- Recorded: 2008
- Genre: Dance-pop
- Length: 3:24
- Label: YG
- Songwriters: G-Dragon; Lee Young-hoon
- Producers: G-Dragon; Teddy Park

BigBang singles chronology
"Number 1" (2008)	"Sunset Glow" (2008)	"Strong Baby" (2009)

"Sunset Glow" (붉은 노을) is a song recorded by South Korean boy band BigBang. Released on November 5, 2008, through YG Entertainment, it served as the lead single from the quintet's second studio album Remember (2008). It is a remake of Lee Moon-sae's song of the same title.

=== Background ===
Prior to recording, Yang Hyun-suk, CEO and founder of YG Entertainment, contacted Lee Moon-sae to request permission for BigBang to cover the song, whose original single was released in 1988. During the 2008 KBS Music Festival, the two artists performed the song together. The song reached number one on the KBS's music show Music Bank. It charted on Melon Top 100 Chart for 31 weeks. In 2012, "Sunset Glow" was covered by Teen Top's Niel, C.A.P. and Chunji for SBS's 1,000 Songs Challenge.

=== Accolades ===
Awards for "Sunset Glow" by BigBang
Year	Organization	Award	Result	Ref.
2008	Cyworld Digital Music Awards	Song of the Month (November)	Won	
2008	Mnet Asian Music Awards	Best Male Group	Nominated	

Music program awards (7 total)
Program	Date	Ref.
Inkigayo	November 30, 2008	
Inkigayo	December 7, 2008	
Inkigayo	December 14, 2008	
M Countdown	December 4, 2008	
Music Bank	November 21, 2008	
Music Bank	November 28, 2008	
Music Bank	December 26, 2008	

=== Charts ===
==== Weekly charts ====
Chart (2024–2025)	Peak position
South Korea (Circle)	80

==== Year-end charts ====
Year-end chart performance for "Sunset Glow"
Chart (2025)	Position
South Korea (Circle)	129
