= Let's Talk About Love (EP) =

EP by Seungri
- Released: August 19, 2013
- Recorded: 2012–13
- Genre: R&B; pop; dance-pop
- Length: 21:22
- Label: YG
- Producer: Ham Seung-Chun, Ukjin Kang, P.K

Seungri chronology
V.V.I.P (2011)	Let's Talk About Love (2013)	The Great Seungri (2018)

Singles from Let's Talk About Love
- 1. "Gotta Talk To U" Released: August 18, 2013

Japanese Version

Singles from Let's Talk About Love
- 1. "The Feelings Painted In The Sky" Released: November 15, 2013

Let's Talk About Love is the second extended play (EP) by South Korean singer Seungri on August 19, 2013 it was released as an EP in South Korea, while on October 9 of the same year a Japanese version was released with 14 tracks.

== Release and reception ==
Recording for Seungri's second Korean EP took over two years, where he also involved himself with the production of the album. The EP was released on August 19, 2013, debuting at number one on the Gaon Chart and went on to sell over 70,000 copies. He promoted the singles "Gotta Talk to You" (Korean: 할말 있어요, Revised Romanization: Halmal Isseoyo) and the eponymous title track. In October of the same year, he released his first Japanese album, selling over 14,000 copies in its first day and topping the Oricon Charts. The album contained songs from his previous albums, as well as the new song "The Feelings Painted in the Sky" (Japanese: 空に描く思い), which was later used as the theme song for Seungri's first Japanese television drama Yubikoi ～Kimini Okuru Message～.

The album was well received, Billboard described the album as "showcases Seungri's affinity for high-quality pop and electro-pop jams." and naming "Let's Talk About Love" as one of the stand out tracks of the album, and calling it "one of the most accessible Korean tracks released this year.". All the 6 songs debuted in the Gaon Digital Singles and the Billboard K-Pop Hot 100 charts.

== Track listing ==
Korean EP
No.	Title	Lyrics	Music	Arrangement	Length
1.	"Let's Talk About Love" (featuring G-Dragon and Taeyang)	Seungri, G-Dragon, Taeyang	Seungri, Ham Seung-Chun, Ukjin Kang	Ham Seung-Chun, Ukjin Kang	3:26
2.	"Gotta Talk to U" (할말 있어요; Halmal iss-eoyo)	Seungri	Seungri, Ham Seung-Chun, Ukjin Kang	Ham Seung-Chun, Ukjin Kang	3:35
3.	"GG Be" (featuring Jennie of Blackpink)	Ukjin Kang, Seungri	Ukjin Kang, Seungri, P.K	P.K	3:37
4.	"Come to My" (그딴 거 없어; Geuttan geo eobs-eo)	Seungri	Seungri, P.K	P.K	3:37
5.	"You Hoooo!!!"	Seungri	Seungri, Ham Seung-Chun, Ukjin Kang	Ham Seung-Chun, Ukjin Kang	3:39
6.	"Love Box"	Seungri	Seungri, Ham Seung-Chun, Ukjin Kang	Ham Seung-Chun, Ukjin Kang	3:27
Total length:					21:22

Japanese Full Album
No.	Title	Lyrics	Music	Length
1.	"Intro (Let's Talk About Love)"	Seungri, Sunny Boy	Seungri, Ham Seung-Chun, Ukjin Kang, G-Dragon, Taeyang	1:50
2.	"Gotta Talk to U" (僕を見つめて)	Seungri, Yamamoto Chengmei	Seungri, Ham Seung-Chun, Ukjin Kang	3:35
3.	"GG Be" (featuring Jennie of Blackpink)	Seungri, Sunny Boy	Ukjin Kang, Seungri, P.K	3:37
4.	"Come to My" (アイなんていらない; Ai Nante Iranai)	Seungri, Yamamoto Chengmei	Seungri, P.K	3:37
5.	"You Hoooo!!!"	Seungri, Sunny Boy	Seungri, Ham Seung-Chun, Ukjin Kang	3:39
6.	"Love Box"	Seungri, RJ Project	Seungri, Ham Seung-Chun, Ukjin Kang	3:27
7.	"Strong Baby"	G-Dragon, Jinyeol Bae, Sunny Boy	G-Dragon, Jinyeol Bae	3:46
8.	"VVIP"	Seungri, Sunny Boy	Seungri, P.K, Dee.P	3:38
9.	"I Know" (with May J)	Seungri, Shoko Fujibayashi	Seungri, P.K, Dee.P, Myoungjae Ko	3:25
10.	"Magic"	Seungri, RJ Project	Seungri, Choice37	3:18
11.	"White Love"	Seungri, Yamamoto Chengmei	Seungri, P.K	3:44
12.	"The Feelings Painted In The Sky" (空に描く思い)	Seungri, Yamamoto Chengmei	Seungri, P.K	3:44
13.	"What Can I Do"	Seungri	Seungri, Bigtone, P.K	3:37
14.	"Let's Talk About Love (Korean version)" (featuring G-Dragon and Taeyang)	Seungri, G-Dragon, Taeyang	Seungri, Ham Seung-Chun, Ukjin Kang	3:24
15.	"Gotta Talk to U" (Hard Remix version)	Seungri	Seungri, Ham Seung-Chun, Ukjin Kang	4:43
Total length:				52:48

== Charts ==
Chart (2016)	Peak position
Japanese Albums (Oricon)	4
South Korean Weekly Albums (Gaon)	1
South Korean Yearly Albums (Gaon)	30

== Sales ==
Chart	Sales
Japan	22,845
South Korea	79,222

== Release history ==
Country	Date	Type	Label	Format	Ref
World	August 19, 2013	EP	YG Entertainment	digital download	
South Korea	August 19, 2013	EP	YG Entertainment, Kt music	CD	
Japan	October 9, 2013	Studio album	YGEX	CD, digital download	

== See also ==
- Big Bang (South Korean band)
- YG Entertainment
