= 1, 2, 3! (Seungri song) =

Single by Seungri

from the album The Great Seungri
- Released: July 20, 2018
- Length: 3:25
- Label: YG
- Songwriters: Teddy; Seungri
- Producers: Teddy; Seo Won Jin; 24; Seungri

Seungri singles chronology
"Ignite" (2018)	"1, 2, 3!" / "Where R U From" (2018)

"1, 2, 3!" (Korean: 셋 셀테니; RR: Set selteni) is a Korean-language song by South Korean singer Seungri from his first Korean studio album, The Great Seungri (2018). It was released by YG Entertainment on July 20, 2018, as the lead single from album. The song was written by Teddy and Seungri, and co-produced by both with Seo Won Jin and 24. It was the last single released by Seungri prior to his retirement from the entertainment industry in 2019.

== Composition ==
"1, 2, 3!" is a pop song which contains a clap-happy beat and perky guitar riffs driving the tune. Seungri chants the line "I will count up to three" in the chorus, amid titular chanting "You fall in love right away." The song was originally planned to be recorded by girl group Blackpink, however, during its production, it was found that it would fit better in a male voice and in that way it was presented to Seungri, who decided to work in the song production.

== Charts ==
Chart (2018)	Peak position
South Korea (Gaon Weekly Digital Chart)	13
South Korea (Billboard K-Pop Hot 100)	12
US World Digital Songs (Billboard)	11
