= The Great Seungri =

- Digital version cover.

Studio album by Seungri
- Released: July 20, 2018 (Korean digital); July 23, 2018 (Korean physical); August 8, 2018 (Japanese edition)
- Studios: The Black Label, YG Studio (Seoul)
- Genres: R&B; electronic
- Language: Korean
- Labels: YG; Genie
- Producers: Yang Hyun-suk (exec.); Seungri

Seungri chronology
Let's Talk About Love (2013)	The Great Seungri (2018)

Melon version
- Alternate "Melon version" cover

Singles from The Great Seungri
- 1. "1, 2, 3!" Released: July 20, 2018; 2. "Where R U From" Released: July 20, 2018

The Great Seungri is the only studio album by South Korean singer Seungri. It was released on July 20, 2018 by YG Entertainment and Genie Music. It is available in two versions and contains nine tracks, with "1, 2, 3!" as its lead single and "Where R U From" as its subtitle. This is also his final Korean release before his retirement in 2019.

== Background and release ==
In January 2018, Seungri revealed that he had prepared a solo album alongside solo concerts.

On July 2, the name and release date of the album was officially announced. On July 20, the music video for lead single "1, 2, 3!" was released, which was inspired by the film Grease. Meanwhile the music video for the sub-title, "Where R U From" (featuring Mino) was released several days after the album release date.

== Packaging ==
The physical CD album was released in two different versions: melon and orange. The album includes album cover, 2 CDs, lyrics book, photo book, photo card, selfie photo card, postcard, coaster, sticker, flyer, and double-sided poster.

== Promotion ==
On June 4, it was announced through YGEX that Seungri will be holding his first solo concert in Korea. The concert will be held at the Jangchung Gymnasium on August 4 and 5 and will be titled Seungri 2018 1st Solo Tour 'The Great Seungri' in Seoul.

To promote the album, Seungri appeared on several television programs, including JTBC's Idol Room, broadcast on July 24, 2018.

== Track listing ==
No.	Title	Lyrics	Music	Arrangement	Length
1.	"1, 2, 3!" (셋 셀테니; ses selteni)	Teddy; Seungri	Teddy; Seo Won Jin; 24; Seungri	24; Seo Won Jin	3:25
2.	"Where R U From" (feat. Mino)	Seungri; MINO	Seungri; Future Bounce	Future Bounce	3:45
3.	"Love Is You" (feat. Blue.D)	Seungri; Luna tune	Seungri; Luna tune; Future Bounce	Future Bounce	3:30
4.	"(Mollado)" (몰라도; mollado) (feat. B.I)	Seungri; B.I	Seungri; Future Bounce; B.I	Future Bounce	3:18
5.	"Sweet Lie" (달콤한 거짓말; dalkomhan geojismal) (feat. Dannic)	Seungri	Daan Romers; Jenson Vaughan; Alisha Pillay; Richard Glenmor Beynon	Dannic	2:59
6.	"Be Friend"	Seungri	Seungri; Future Bounce; Lee Seung Youb; Kim Sang Wook	Future Bounce	3:21
7.	"Hotline"	Seungri	Seungri; Future Bounce	Future Bounce	3:31
8.	"Alone" (혼자 있는법; honja issneunbeob)	Seungri	R.Tee; 8!; Brian Lee; Seungri	R.Tee	3:49
9.	"Good Luck to You"	Seungri	Seungri; Seo Won Jin; R.Tee; 24	R.Tee; Seo Won Jin; 24	3:18

== Charts ==
Chart (2018)	Peak position
French Digital Albums (SNEP)	82
Japanese Albums (Oricon)	51
South Korean Albums (Gaon)	1
US World Albums (Billboard)	3

== Sales ==
Country	Sales
South Korea	50,375
China	130,215
Japan	10,146

== Release history ==
Country	Date	Label	Format	Ref
Various	July 20, 2018	YG Entertainment, Genie Music	Digital download	
South Korea	July 23, 2018	YG Entertainment, Genie Music	CD	
